= Frimley, New Zealand =

Suburb of Hastings, New Zealand

Frimley
- Suburb
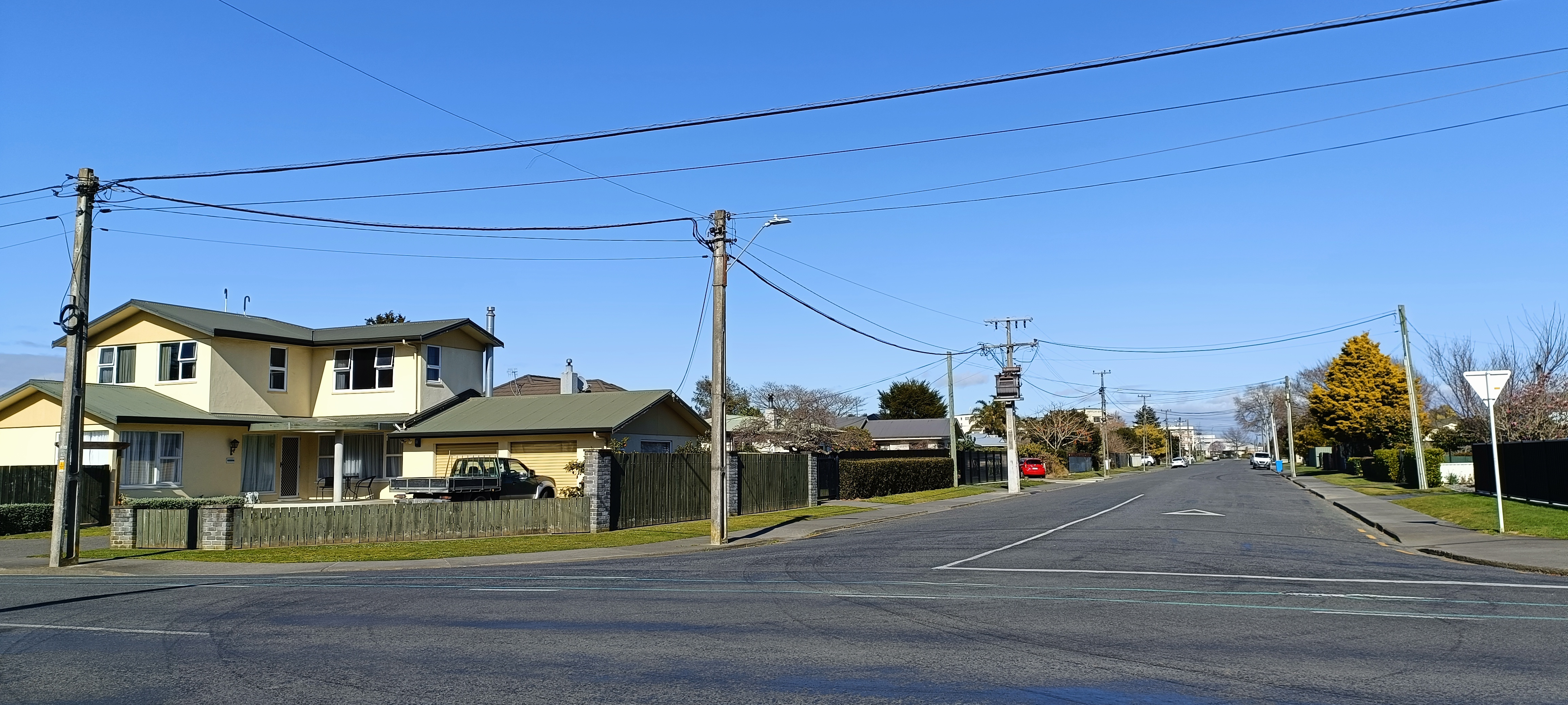
- Frimley, 2023
- Interactive map of Frimley
- Coordinates: 39.621817°S 176.826972°E
- Country: New Zealand
- City: Hastings
- Local authority: Hastings District Council
- Electoral ward: Hastings-Havelock North General Ward; Takitimu Māori Ward
- Established: 1957

Area
  - Land: 248 ha (610 acres)

Population (June 2025)
  - Total: 3,850
  - Density: 1,550/km^{2} (4,020/sq mi)

	Twyford	Pakowhai
Flaxmere	Frimley	Tomoana
Camberley	St Leonards	Mahora

Frimley is a suburb of Hastings City, in the Hawke's Bay Region of New Zealand's North Island.

The fertile lands were added to the Hastings city boundary in 1957 to address a shortage of land.

== Demographics ==
Frimley covers 2.48 km^{2} (0.96 sq mi) and had an estimated population of 3,850 as of June 2025, with a population density of 1,552 people per km^{2}.

Historical population
Year	Pop.	±% p.a.
2006	1,713	—
2013	2,484	+5.45%
2018	2,865	+2.90%
2023	3,648	+4.95%
The 2006 population is for a smaller area of 2.03 km^{2}. Source:

Frimley had a population of 3,648 in the 2023 New Zealand census, an increase of 783 people (27.3%) since the 2018 census, and an increase of 1,164 people (46.9%) since the 2013 census. There were 1,833 males, 1,806 females, and 6 people of other genders in 1,284 dwellings. 1.9% of people identified as LGBTIQ+. The median age was 40.5 years (compared with 38.1 years nationally). There were 699 people (19.2%) aged under 15 years, 534 (14.6%) aged 15 to 29, 1,572 (43.1%) aged 30 to 64, and 840 (23.0%) aged 65 or older.

People could identify as more than one ethnicity. The results were 67.0% European (Pākehā); 12.3% Māori; 3.9% Pasifika; 24.7% Asian; 0.8% Middle Eastern, Latin American and African New Zealanders (MELAA); and 2.6% other, which includes people giving their ethnicity as "New Zealander". English was spoken by 93.5%, Māori by 2.3%, Samoan by 0.9%, and other languages by 18.8%. No language could be spoken by 2.4% (e.g. too young to talk). New Zealand Sign Language was known by 0.3%. The percentage of people born overseas was 28.0, compared with 28.8% nationally.

Religious affiliations were 43.8% Christian, 2.5% Hindu, 0.3% Islam, 0.7% Māori religious beliefs, 1.3% Buddhist, 0.2% New Age, 0.1% Jewish, and 8.2% other religions. People who answered that they had no religion were 37.0%, and 6.1% of people did not answer the census question.

Of those at least 15 years old, 678 (23.0%) people had a bachelor's or higher degree, 1,425 (48.3%) had a post-high school certificate or diploma, and 849 (28.8%) people exclusively held high school qualifications. The median income was $41,800, compared with $41,500 nationally. 318 people (10.8%) earned over $100,000 compared to 12.1% nationally. The employment status of those at least 15 was 1,488 (50.5%) full-time, 411 (13.9%) part-time, and 57 (1.9%) unemployed.

== Education ==
Frimley School is a co-educational Year 1-6 state primary school, with a roll of 469. It opened in 1952.

Hastings Girls' High School is a Year 9-13 girls' state secondary school, with a roll of 525. It separated from Hastings Boys' High School in 1955, and officially opened in 1956.

Lindisfarne College is a state-integrated Year 7-13 boys' secondary school, with a roll of 564. It opened in 1953, and has links to the Presbyterian Church.

School rolls are as of July 2026.
