= Heretaunga Street =

Street in New Zealand

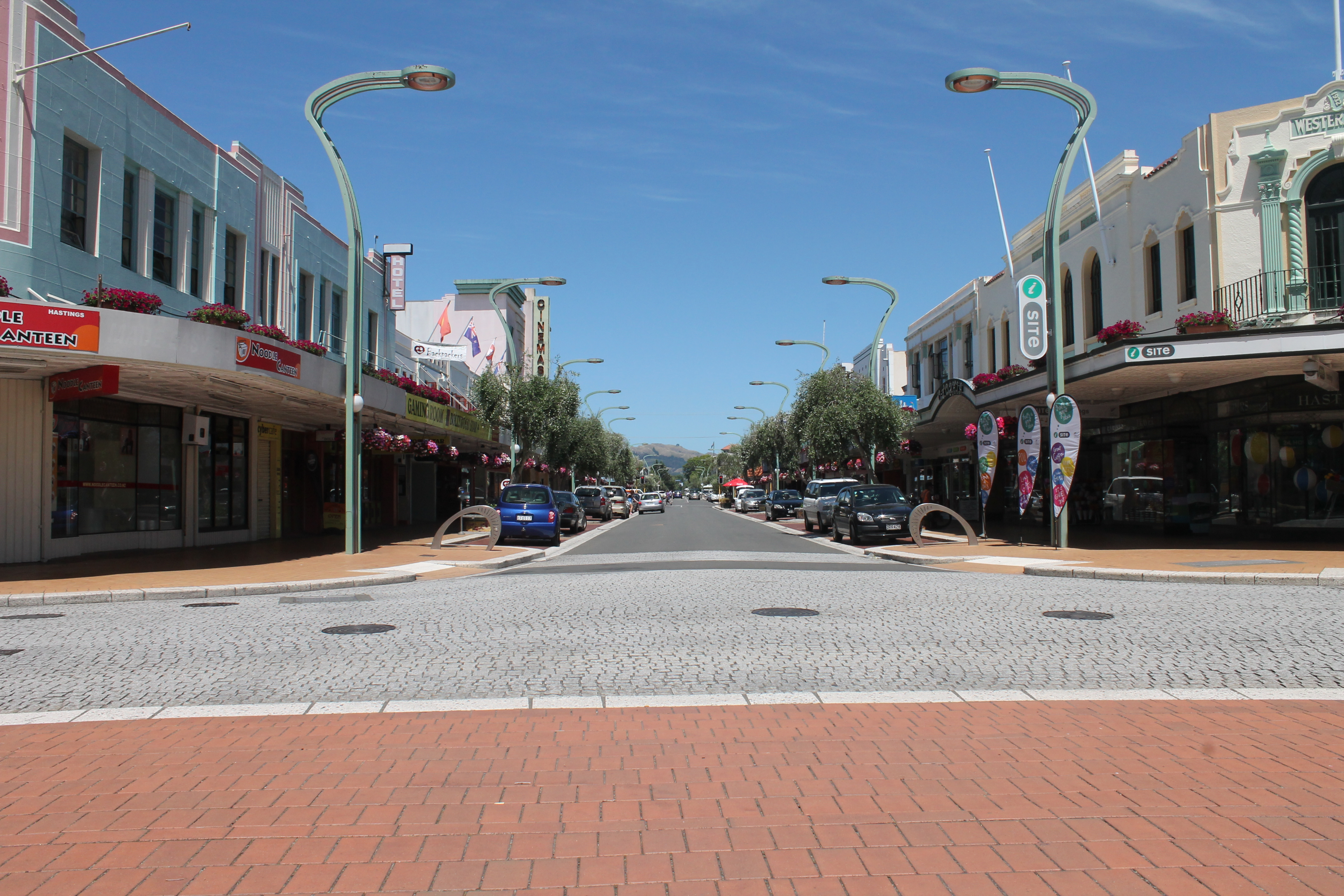
- View along Heretaunga Street from Russell Street in a south-east direction
- Native name: Te Tiriti o Heretaunga (Māori)
- Location: Stortford Lodge, St Leonards, Hastings Central, Parkvale
- Coordinates: 39.642318°S 176.843573°E
- North end: Maraekakaho Road; Omahu Road; Pakowhai Road
- South end: Norton Road; Havelock Road

Construction
- Inauguration: 1867

Heretaunga Street (Māori pronunciation: [hɛɾɛˈtaʉŋa]), Māori: Te Tiriti o Heretaunga, Heretaunga, is the main arterial road through Hastings, New Zealand. The street forms the heart of the Central Business District of Hastings City across six blocks numbered 100, 200, and 300 Blocks with the railway line dividing the blocks by East and West. The name Heretaunga is taken from the name of the Māori Land Block on which Hastings was established in 1873.

The majority of buildings along Heretaunga Street were destroyed or damaged in the deadly 1931 Hawke's Bay earthquake. As a result the six City Centre blocks were rebuilt predominantly between the years 1931–1936 in the architectural styles of Stripped Classicism, Art Deco, and Spanish Mission Revival and now comprise a full historic streetscape in one of the longest contiguous retail high streets in New Zealand.

== Description ==
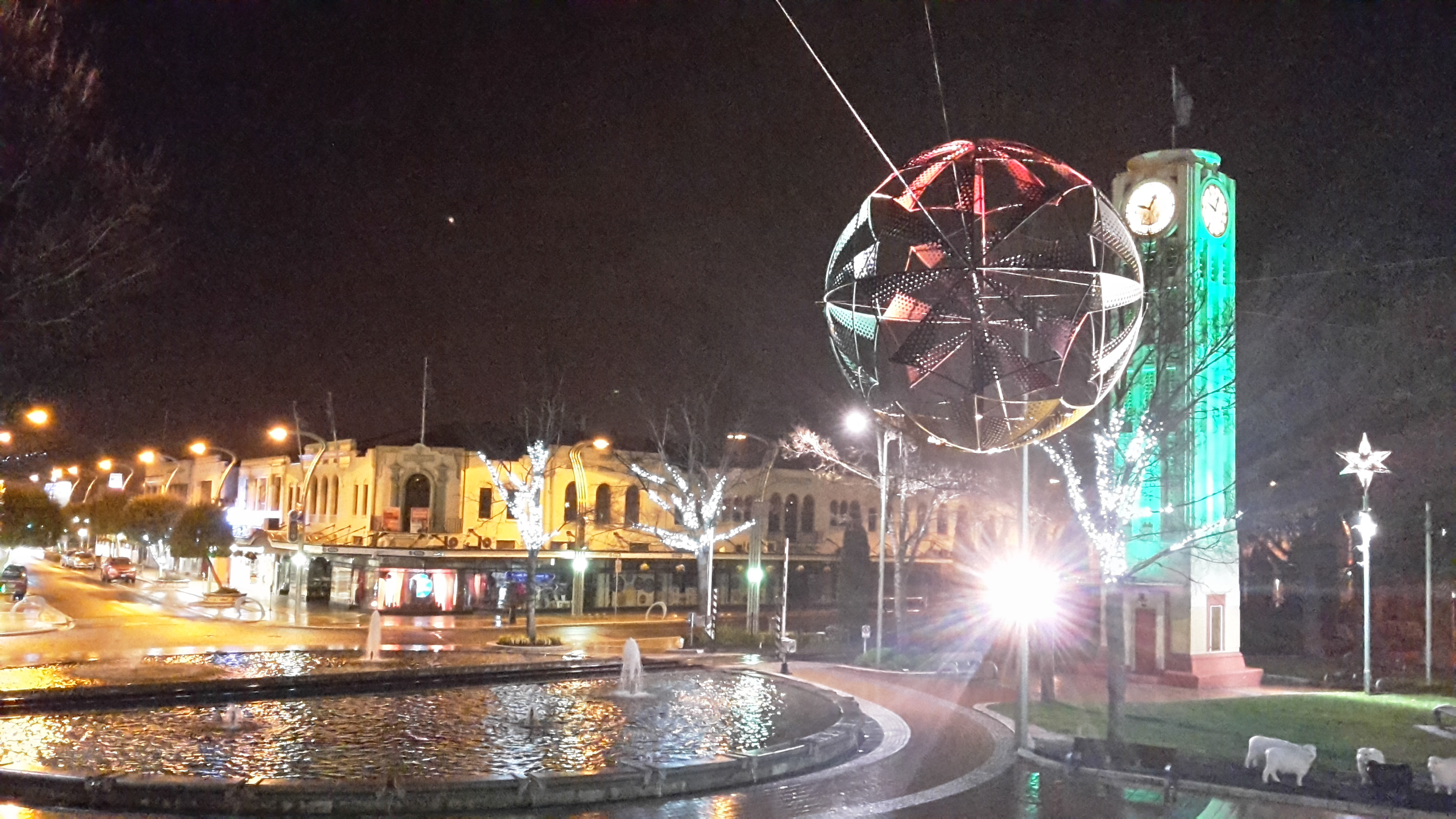
Heretaunga Street where it crosses the railway at the Clock Tower

Heretaunga Street connects Hastings with Havelock North where it goes under the name Havelock Road, and runs for 2.3 km (1.43 Miles) until it officially goes by the name Heretaunga Street; it then runs for another 1.8 km (1.1 mi) until it stops at Russell Street where the railway line runs through the city and through the city's fountain. Then the street continues for another 120 metres (390 ft) as a pedestrian mall, where the road is a large public footpath, tree garden and café seating area. Then, from Railway Road for another 1.56 km (0.97 mi) as Heretaunga Street. Then at the area known as Stortford Lodge, at a road called Maraekakaho Road, a ring road then changes the name to Omahu Road, where it continues for another 6.75 km (4.19 mi) where it reaches State Highway 50 at a place called Omahu, hence the name of the street. In total Heretaunga Street runs for 12.75 km (7.92 mi) from Omahu to Havelock North, but the road only runs for 3.7 km (2.3 mi) under its proper name.

The road is mostly two lanes wide (one lane in each direction) and has a parking shoulders on either side. The legal road has an average width of approximately 19.2 metres (63 ft).

The location where the road intersects with the railway line has for generations been regarded as the centrepiece of Hastings. It is here where the Hastings Clock Tower was built after the 1931 Hawke's Bay earthquake, and the short pedestrian mall is located here. The clock tower is registered as a Category I heritage building with Heritage New Zealand. A night market is held on Thursdays in the mall, organised by the Hastings City Business Association.

== History ==
Heretaunga Street is Hastings' main street since the 1880s and is partially formed along a traditional Māori pathway connecting the Māori villages of Ōmāhu, Mākirikiri, and Karamū. The road was first formed in 1867 from the home of Francis Hicks, founder of the Township of Hastings 1873. Hicks had established a Store on the corner of Karamū Road and Heretaunga Street, which was the first Post Office in the early days of Hastings.

In the 1870s formation of roads was overseen by the Heretaunga Road Board of the Hawke's Bay County Council, and was largely funded by European land owners, who were also the Board Members. With the implementation of Julius Vogel's Public Works Scheme and the establishment of a Railway Station at Hastings, a feeder road was required from the town of Havelock to Hastings. This feeder road is the origins of Havelock Road the east length of Heretaunga Street. A detailed survey plan of the Heretaunga Plains was drawn by James Rochfort in 1876, which shows the full length of Heretaunga Street from Havelock to Ōmāhu through the centre of the block. The Township of Hastings and formation of the Central Business District is shown with the railway running through the middle of the town. The roads were first formed using fill from drains dug alongside the road, then laid with metal quarried from the beds of the Mākirikiri and Mākaramū anabranch rivers. The road was then laid with a top coat of lime, which created dusty conditions in summer, and boggy wet conditions during winter.

On 4 February 1884 Hastings was proclaimed a Town District with a population of 617 and the constitution of a Town Board, which assumed responsibility for planning and maintaining local roads from the Heretaunga Road Board.

The architectural streetscape has developed through many styles as major fires in February 1893 and May 1907 forced the need to shift from a wooden Carpenter's style, to Victorian neo-Baroque Masonry, and into Stripped Classical ferro-concrete.

The street was initially built for horse drawn traffic, and with the introduction of the motor vehicle, the street was laid with stone from 1914.

The most radical change came about through the Hawke's Bay earthquake of 3 February 1931 when the majority of buildings along Heretaunga Street were destroyed or damaged. Following the earthquake the main street was rebuilt predominantly in the architectural styles of Stripped Classicism, Art Deco, and Spanish Mission Revival. The rebuild following the earthquake between the years 1931-1936 was undertaken by competent local architects, and notable national architects Edmund Anscombe and Vivan Palmer Haughton.

The main six blocks of the Central Business District were predominantly built during the 1920s and 1930s and maintain a high level of authenticity, with strong retail and hospitality trade.

== Heritage buildings ==
Most of the heritage buildings in Hastings as listed by Heritage New Zealand are within the central business district, and the streets that have most of them are Queen Street West, Heretaunga Street West, and Russell Street. Where Russell Street intercepts Heretaunga Street, there is in addition an historic area designation by Heritage New Zealand. The most iconic heritage monument is the Hastings Clock Tower, which commemorates the 1931 Hawke's Bay earthquake.

Albert Hotel on the corner of Karamu Street and Heretaunga Street East was Hastings' oldest building, and registered as a Category II building. It was derelict and had sat empty for some years before it was demolished in December 2014.

The following table lists the registered heritage buildings that have a frontage onto Heretaunga Street.

Photo	Name	Register number	Category	Address	Description
Hastings Municipal Buildings 1915, Albert Garnett	Hastings Municipal Buildings	177	I	101 Hastings Street South and 319–325 Heretaunga Street East	Significant as the seat of the municipal government for six decades from 1915 to 1977 The building is designed by Hastings architect Albert Garnett and was opened in 1915. The building design is a unique fusion of Neo-Baroque, Neo-Classical, Art Nouveau, and Spanish Mission features.
	Westerman's & Co.	178 & 7020	I	101 Heretaunga Street East and Russell Street South	Hastings landmark since its construction in 1932; designed by Edmund Anscombe The building is a unique fusion of Spanish Mission, Art Deco, and Stripped Classicism. The building is also recognised as being within the Russell Street Historic Area register No.7020
	R&R Building	7020		100 Heretaunga Street East and Russell Street	The R&R Building bookmarks Heretaunga Street East opposite the Westerman's Building. The R&R Building is a curved bookend corner building providing an asymmetrical Art Deco street plan. The building is an integral feature of the Russell Street Historic Area and Heretaunga Street East viewshaft.
Central Building 1934, Edmund Anscombe	Central Building	1073	II	201 Heretaunga Street West and 100 Market Street North	A well-known landmark in Hastings, Central Building was designed by Edmund Anscombe and built in 1934 The building is Stripped Classical with Greek Revival ornamentation.
Hastings Clock Tower, Sydney Chaplin	Hastings Town Clock Tower 1935	1075	I	Railway Road and Hastings Central Mall	Considered to be one of Hastings' finest public landmarks; not the official earthquake memorial but holds plaques with the 93 names of those killed The Clock Tower is designed by Hastings architect Sydney Chaplin and is Art Deco in style with saw-tooth ornamentation. The design was selected by competition and erected to commemorate the rebuild of the Earthquake. Above the door to the tower is displayed the Borough of Hastings Coat of Arms, and above the door veranda is the date '1935'. The clock mechanism is manufactured by W. Littlejohns & Co. and the bells were salvaged from the Hastings Post Office clock tower destroyed in the 1931 Earthquake. The bells chime the Westminster Quarters. Brass Memorial Plaques were added in 1995 to commemorate the 1931 Earthquake and remember those who died. In 2022 the Hastings District Council commissioned a façade colour change for the tower which is now pastel blue, green, yellow and pink.
Villa d'Este 1929, Davies, Garnett & Phillips	Villa d'Este	1103	II	341–351 Heretaunga Street West	Built in 1929, destroyed in the 1931 earthquake and rebuilt to the original design Designed by Davies, Garnett & Phillips in the Spanish Mission style.
Roach's Building Art Deco Tower 1934, Davies & Phillips	Roachs' Building	2787	II	244 Heretaunga Street West and King Street South	One of the most striking buildings in Hastings Built in 1934 to a design by Davies & Phillips in the Art Deco Streamline Moderne style.
	St Mark's Anglican Church	1032	II	513 Heretaunga Street East	Since October 2008 used as a Greek Orthodox Church The building was moved to its current location from Clive. It is built in the Carpenter's Gothic style.

== Importance as a road ==
Heretaunga Street is known as the longest and most central of the main north–south arteries in Hastings, being the only one that goes straight from Flaxmere to Havelock North. The road is also the only one that runs through the middle of the Central Business Districts and is home to much of Hastings' commerce and trade, where at the centre of the Street, at the CBD it is a 2.2 kilometre shopping strip, and at the very centre in the town fountain and clock tower is a pedestrian-only section where large stores meet cafés, restaurants and tall office blocks. This is generally known as the 'downtown' or 'central city' of Hastings.
