= Raureka =

Suburb of Hastings, New Zealand

- Suburb
- Interactive map of Raureka
- Coordinates: 39°38′45″S 176°49′45″E
- Country: New Zealand
- City: Hastings
- Local authority: Hastings District Council
- Electoral ward: Hastings-Havelock North General Ward; Takitimu Māori Ward

Area
  - Land: 212 ha (520 acres)

Population (June 2025)
  - Total: 5,500
  - Density: 2,600/km^{2} (6,700/sq mi)

	Camberley	St Leonards
	Raureka	Hastings Central
Longlands		Akina

Raureka is a suburb of Hastings City, in the Hawke's Bay Region of New Zealand's North Island.

The suburb has three council-owned parks: Ebbett Park, St Leonards Park and Whenua Takoha Reserve. Raureka locals established a campaign in 2018 to stop the council selling part of Ebbett Park to developers.

Raureka has a community hub with community gardens based at Raureka School.

== Demographics ==
Raureka covers 2.12 km^{2} (0.82 sq mi) and had an estimated population of 5,500 as of June 2025, with a population density of 2,594 people per km^{2}.

Historical population
Year	Pop.	±% p.a.
2006	4,599	—
2013	4,539	−0.19%
2018	4,968	+1.82%
2023	5,253	+1.12%
The 2006 population is for a smaller area of 2.08 km^{2}. Source:

Raureka had a population of 5,253 in the 2023 New Zealand census, an increase of 285 people (5.7%) since the 2018 census, and an increase of 714 people (15.7%) since the 2013 census. There were 2,574 males, 2,670 females, and 15 people of other genders in 1,818 dwellings. 2.6% of people identified as LGBTIQ+. There were 1,065 people (20.3%) aged under 15 years, 1,122 (21.4%) aged 15 to 29, 2,274 (43.3%) aged 30 to 64, and 795 (15.1%) aged 65 or older.

People could identify as more than one ethnicity. The results were 59.9% European (Pākehā); 30.2% Māori; 12.8% Pasifika; 12.6% Asian; 0.9% Middle Eastern, Latin American and African New Zealanders (MELAA); and 2.1% other, which includes people giving their ethnicity as "New Zealander". English was spoken by 94.5%, Māori by 7.5%, Samoan by 5.1%, and other languages by 12.1%. No language could be spoken by 2.2% (e.g. too young to talk). New Zealand Sign Language was known by 0.6%. The percentage of people born overseas was 22.8, compared with 28.8% nationally.

Religious affiliations were 35.8% Christian, 1.9% Hindu, 0.5% Islam, 3.3% Māori religious beliefs, 0.7% Buddhist, 0.5% New Age, and 4.2% other religions. People who answered that they had no religion were 48.0%, and 5.4% of people did not answer the census question.

Of those at least 15 years old, 636 (15.2%) people had a bachelor's or higher degree, 2,253 (53.8%) had a post-high school certificate or diploma, and 1,308 (31.2%) people exclusively held high school qualifications. 213 people (5.1%) earned over $100,000 compared to 12.1% nationally. The employment status of those at least 15 was 2,256 (53.9%) full-time, 450 (10.7%) part-time, and 99 (2.4%) unemployed.

Individual statistical areas
Name	Area (km^{2})	Population	Density (per km^{2})	Dwellings	Median age	Median income
Raureka	1.10	3,207	2,915	1,074	34.1 years	$39,000
Raceway Park	1.02	2,046	2,006	744	36.4 years	$40,500
New Zealand					38.1 years	$41,500

== Education ==
Raureka School and Ebbett Park School are co-educational state primary schools serving Years 1 to 6, with rolls of 304 and 162, respectively. Raureka School opened in 1914 and Ebbett Park School opened in 1960.

Hastings Boys' High School is a state secondary school serving Years 9 to 15, with a roll of 755. The school opened in 1904 as Hastings District High School, taking over secondary education from Hastings Borough School. It was renamed Hastings Technical School in 1922. In 1954-55, Hastings Girls' High School was opened, leaving Hastings Boys' High School from 1956 on the original site.

Rolls are as of July 2026.
