= St Leonards, Hastings =

Suburb of Hastings, New Zealand

St Leonards
- Suburb
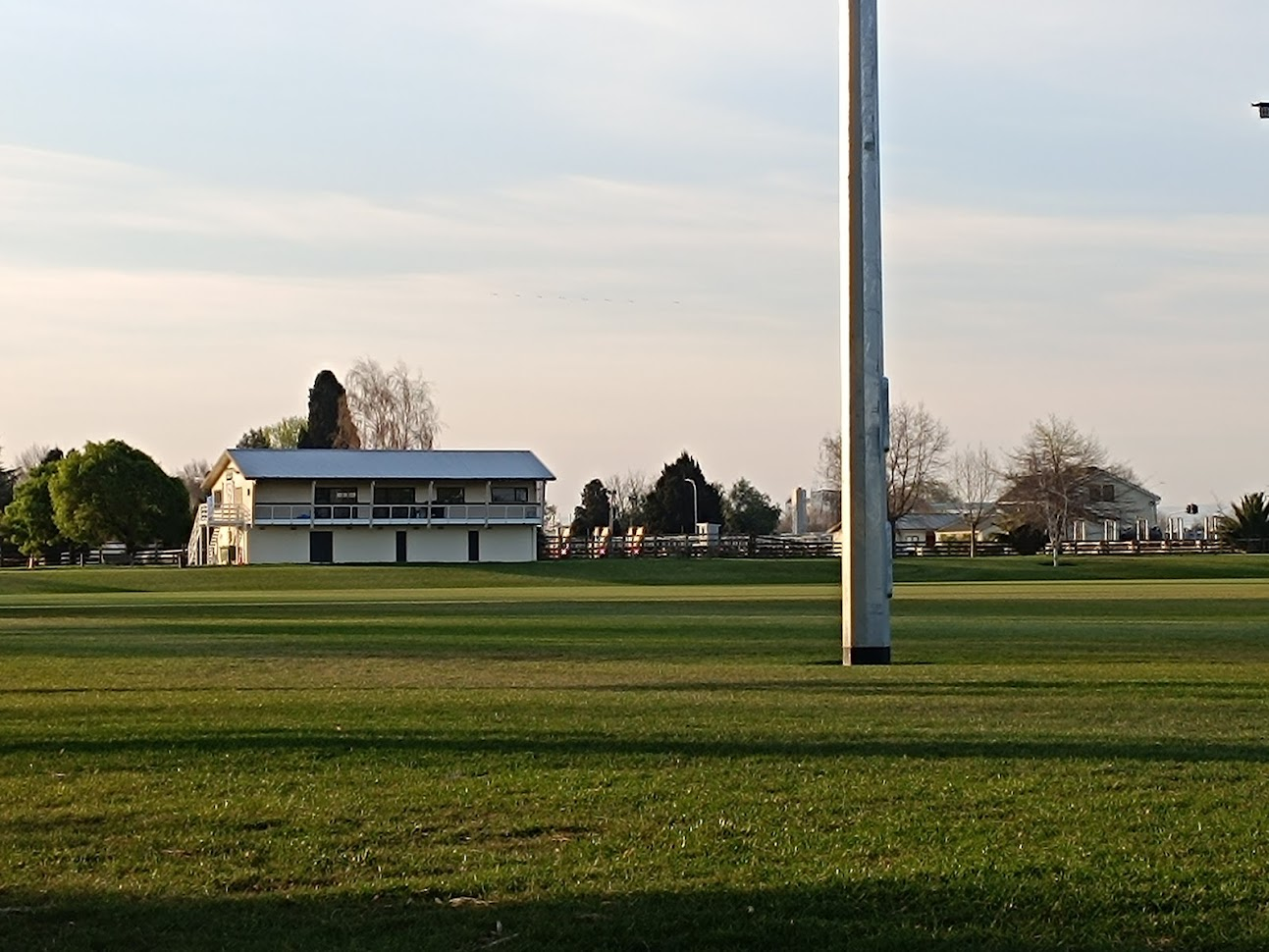
- View of Saint Leonards Park
- Interactive map of St Leonards
- Coordinates: 39.634°S 176.834°E
- Country: New Zealand
- City: Hastings
- Local authority: Hastings District Council
- Electoral ward: Hastings-Havelock North General Ward; Takitimu Māori Ward

Area
  - Land: 103 ha (250 acres)

Population (June 2025)
  - Total: 2,840
  - Density: 2,760/km^{2} (7,140/sq mi)

Camberley	Frimley	Mahora
	St Leonards	Tomoana
Raureka		Hastings Central

St Leonards is an inner suburb of Hastings, New Zealand, in the Hawke's Bay region of New Zealand. It is named for St Leonards-on-Sea, a neighbouring town to Hastings' own English namesake.

The suburb is located immediately north and northwest of the city centre, with the city's main road, Heretaunga Street, passing through its centre.

St Leonard's Park is a sports field used for touch rugby in summer and football in winter.

== Demographics ==
St Leonards covers 1.03 km^{2} (0.40 sq mi) and had an estimated population of 2,840 as of June 2025, with a population density of 2,757 people per km^{2}.

Historical population
Year	Pop.	±% p.a.
2006	2,223	—
2013	2,259	+0.23%
2018	2,646	+3.21%
2023	2,610	−0.27%

St Leonards had a population of 2,610 in the 2023 New Zealand census, a decrease of 36 people (−1.4%) since the 2018 census, and an increase of 351 people (15.5%) since the 2013 census. There were 1,257 males, 1,344 females, and 9 people of other genders in 1,044 dwellings. 2.9% of people identified as LGBTIQ+. The median age was 36.1 years (compared with 38.1 years nationally). There were 483 people (18.5%) aged under 15 years, 522 (20.0%) aged 15 to 29, 1,233 (47.2%) aged 30 to 64, and 369 (14.1%) aged 65 or older.

People could identify as more than one ethnicity. The results were 61.7% European (Pākehā); 28.7% Māori; 8.3% Pasifika; 16.3% Asian; 1.1% Middle Eastern, Latin American and African New Zealanders (MELAA); and 1.5% other, which includes people giving their ethnicity as "New Zealander". English was spoken by 94.6%, Māori by 8.4%, Samoan by 2.0%, and other languages by 15.4%. No language could be spoken by 2.3% (e.g. too young to talk). New Zealand Sign Language was known by 0.8%. The percentage of people born overseas was 24.3, compared with 28.8% nationally.

Religious affiliations were 34.1% Christian, 2.8% Hindu, 0.5% Islam, 3.1% Māori religious beliefs, 1.4% Buddhist, 0.6% New Age, 0.1% Jewish, and 3.8% other religions. People who answered that they had no religion were 47.4%, and 6.6% of people did not answer the census question.

Of those at least 15 years old, 441 (20.7%) people had a bachelor's or higher degree, 1,053 (49.5%) had a post-high school certificate or diploma, and 630 (29.6%) people exclusively held high school qualifications. The median income was $41,600, compared with $41,500 nationally. 126 people (5.9%) earned over $100,000 compared to 12.1% nationally. The employment status of those at least 15 was 1,146 (53.9%) full-time, 255 (12.0%) part-time, and 84 (3.9%) unemployed.
