= Splash Planet =

New Zealand amusement/water park

- Previously known as Fantasyland
- Interactive map of Splash Planet
- Location: Grove Road, Hastings, New Zealand
- Coordinates: 39.644041°S 176.863649°E
- Status: Operating
- Opened: Opened as Fantasy Land in 1967, Splash Planet in 1998
- Slogan: Hawke's Bay's Number One Family Attraction!
- Operating season: November—March as a full water park; partial opening on weekends during rest of year
- Area: 6.5 ha (16 acres)

Attractions
- Total: 12
- Water rides: 7
- Website: www.splashplanet.co.nz

Splash Planet is an amusement park and water park located in the city of Hastings, New Zealand. The park was opened in its current form in 1998.

== Fantasyland ==
Fantasyland first opened in Easter of 1967. It contained several attractions, including a miniature railway, mini-golf, a steamboat ride, play structures, and a few flat rides. By the 1990s, the park was beginning to show its age, and the Hastings District Council proposed that it be redeveloped into a waterpark. At the time of its conception the council had decided that the park would be a money spinner and was certain that it would supplement the taxes that local residents paid. The park was also hoped to attract people from outside the region to visit the region and spend money not only at the park but also at local business within the city.

== Construction ==
Construction of the new waterpark facilities was done by Alexander Construction, a local company who has worked on many other large attractions within Hawke's Bay. Work began in July 1998, and finished before the new year, taking only 4.5 months to complete. This was done at a cost of $4,700,000.

== Referendum ==
Before Splash Planet left the drawing board, the Hastings District Council put the decision on whether or not Splash Planet would be built to public referendum. The referendum outlined a number of policies in an attempt to gain the locals' confidence. These policies included the fact that Splash Planet would be self-sustaining and would not cost the taxpayers any money.

== Financial issues ==
Despite being sold to ratepayers as a money-making venture, Splash Planet is projected to require a ratepayer subsidy of NZ$1.7 million for the 2024–25 season (budgeted at NZ$1.42 million). As of the end of January 2025, visitor numbers were down by 15,000 compared to the previous season, and revenue was NZ$558,000 unfavourable to budget, partially offset by NZ$232,000 in cost savings. Splash Planet closed five weeks earlier than scheduled in March 2025 due to poor weather and staffing shortages, further exacerbating the shortfall.

== Attractions ==
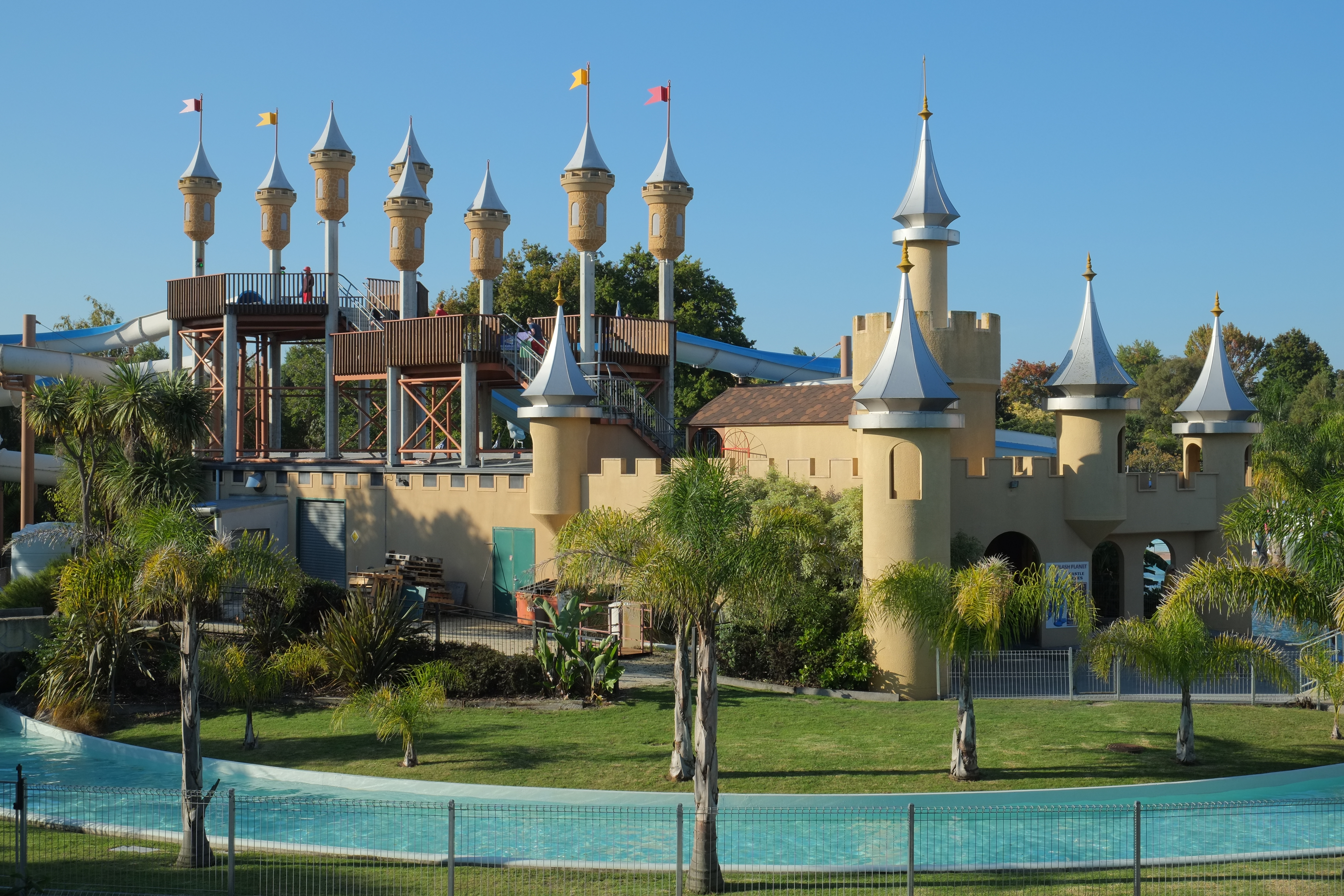
Splash Planet's "Sky Castle"

=== Wet attractions ===
- Double Dipper - Inline tube slide
- Super Cruiser - Open body slide
- Sky Tunnel - Enclosed body slide
- Master Blaster - open/enclosed body slide
- Sky Castle Screamer - Pair of racing body slides
- Never Ending River - A lazy river
- Bumper boats
- Indoor heated pool

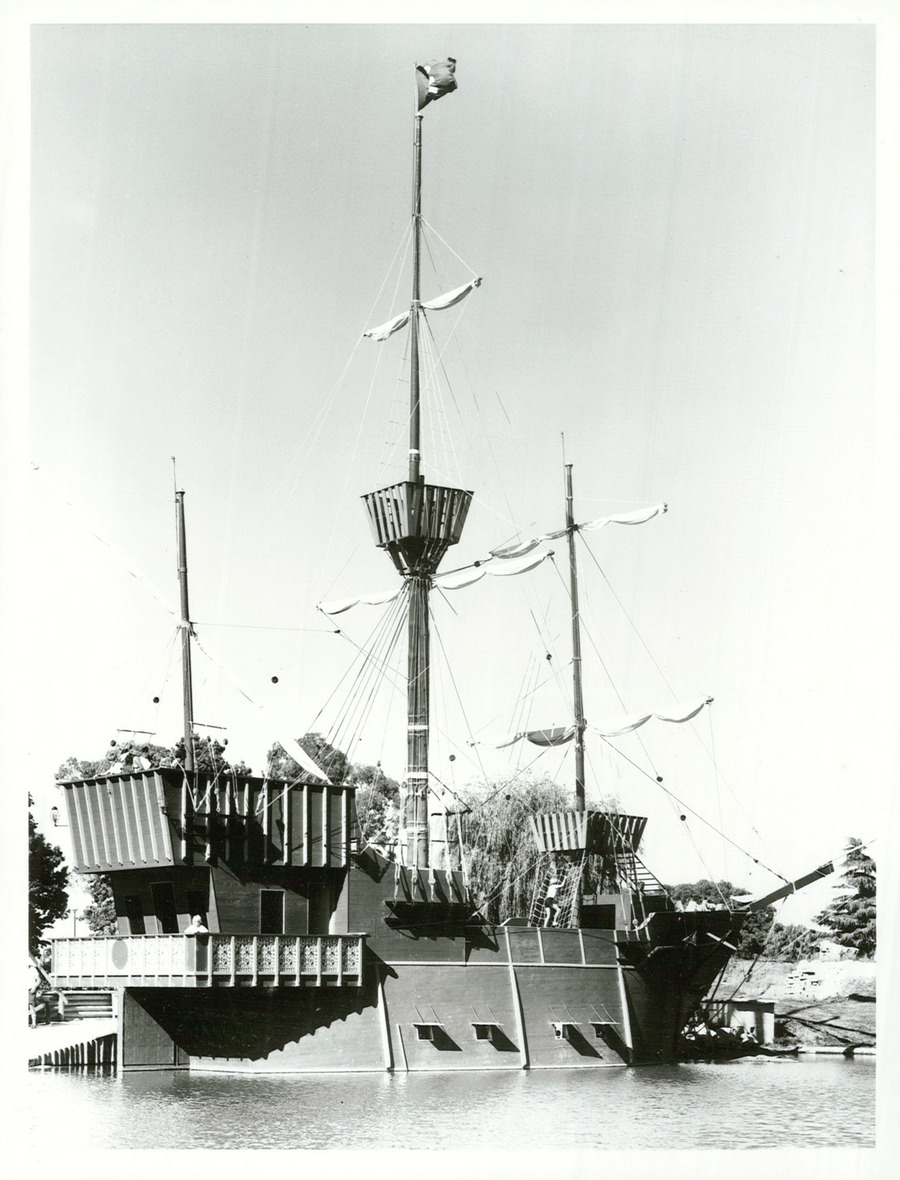
The Pirate Ship at Fantasyland in 1979 which was a victim of arson in 2015.

=== Dry attractions ===
- Fantasyland Express - A miniature railway ride originally part of Fantasyland
- Formula Fun Karts - Go-karts
- Jungle Jeeps - Motorized jeep racing, slower than go-karts
- Flying Fox - Two 40 metre flying foxes
- Mini golf
- Tiny Town - Young children's play area
- Beach volleyball

=== Former attractions ===
- Pirate Ship - a play structure that was burnt down by arsonists in 2015. The ship, built mainly by volunteers and an original attraction when the park was first established as Fantasyland in 1967, was ablaze when the first of three fire crews from Hastings and Napier arrived after the alarm was raised at 6:01 am.

=== Battle of Hastings paintball event ===
In late 2013, a major paintball event known as the Battle of Hastings took place at Splash Planet. It drew players from around New Zealand to compete in massive paintball battles. The event was held again in October 2014.
