= Parkvale, Hastings =

Suburb of Hastings, New Zealand

Parkvale
- Suburb
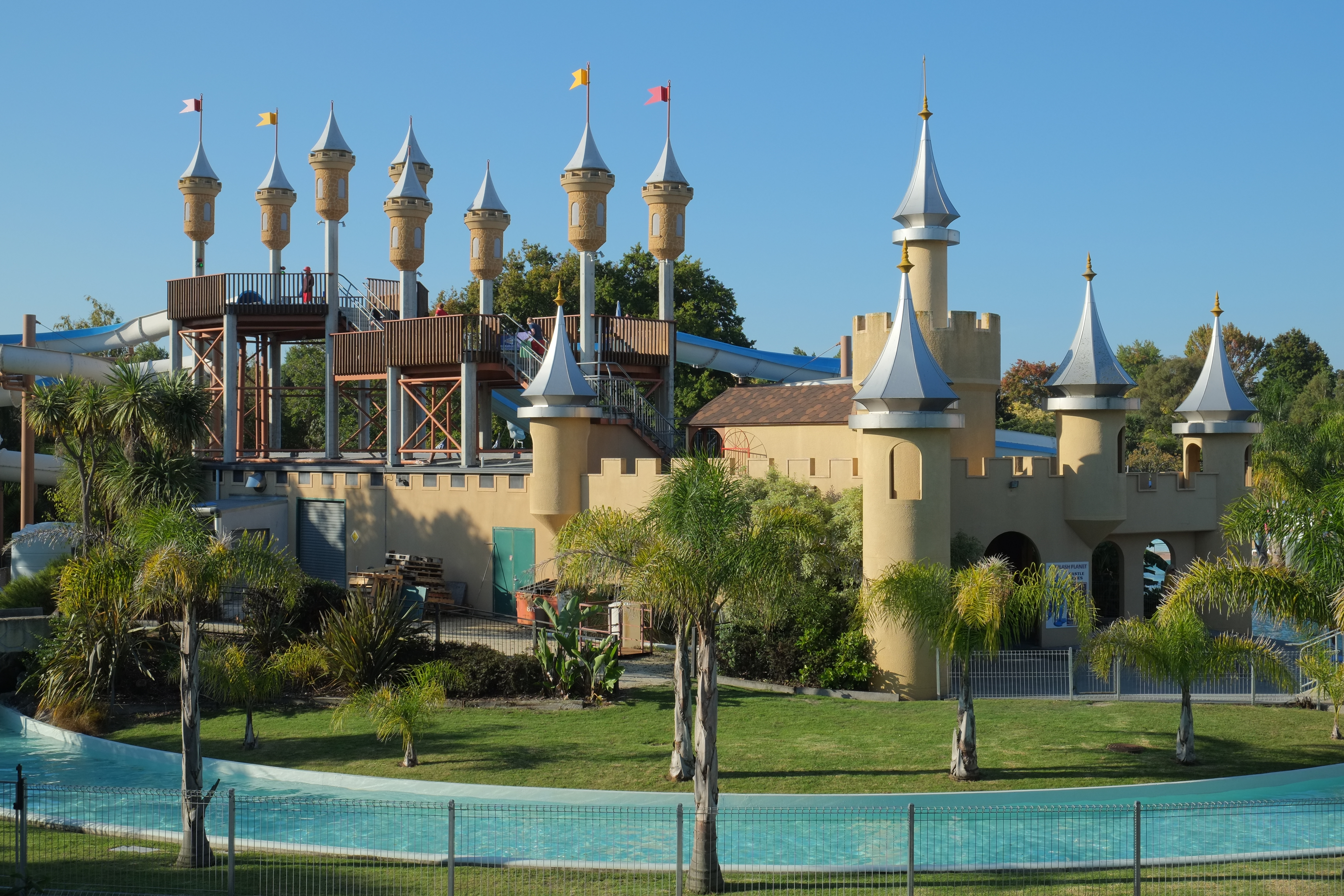
- Sky Castle at Splash Planet
- Interactive map of Parkvale
- Coordinates: 39.650651°S 176.859100°E
- Country: New Zealand
- City: Hastings
- Local authority: Hastings District Council
- Electoral ward: Hastings-Havelock North General Ward; Takitimu Māori Ward

Area
  - Land: 190 ha (470 acres)

Population (June 2025)
  - Total: 4,410
  - Density: 2,300/km^{2} (6,000/sq mi)

| Hastings Central | Mahora | Mayfair |
| Akina | Parkvale |
| Longlands | | Havelock North |

Parkvale is a suburb of Hastings City, in the Hawke's Bay Region of New Zealand's North Island.

Children in the settlement began being educated in hop-drying kiln building in 1919. It remained a separate settlement from Hastings until the second half of the 20th century.

Splash Planet is a water park in the suburb.

== Demographics ==
Parkvale covers 1.90 km^{2} (0.73 sq mi) and had an estimated population of 4,410 as of June 2025, with a population density of 2,321 people per km^{2}.

Historical population
| Year | Pop. | ±% p.a. |
|---|---|---|
| 2006 | 3,669 | — |
| 2013 | 3,882 | +0.81% |
| 2018 | 4,134 | +1.27% |
| 2023 | 4,275 | +0.67% |
The 2006 population is for a smaller area of 1.84 km^{2}. Source:

Parkvale had a population of 4,275 in the 2023 New Zealand census, an increase of 141 people (3.4%) since the 2018 census, and an increase of 393 people (10.1%) since the 2013 census. There were 2,037 males, 2,229 females, and 12 people of other genders in 1,803 dwellings. 2.9% of people identified as LGBTIQ+. There were 714 people (16.7%) aged under 15 years, 756 (17.7%) aged 15 to 29, 1,839 (43.0%) aged 30 to 64, and 966 (22.6%) aged 65 or older.

People could identify as more than one ethnicity. The results were 76.9% European (Pākehā); 20.4% Māori; 4.7% Pasifika; 12.4% Asian; 1.2% Middle Eastern, Latin American and African New Zealanders (MELAA); and 1.5% other, which includes people giving their ethnicity as "New Zealander". English was spoken by 97.0%, Māori by 4.6%, Samoan by 1.5%, and other languages by 12.7%. No language could be spoken by 1.8% (e.g. too young to talk). New Zealand Sign Language was known by 0.6%. The percentage of people born overseas was 23.6, compared with 28.8% nationally.

Religious affiliations were 35.2% Christian, 2.3% Hindu, 1.2% Islam, 1.8% Māori religious beliefs, 0.4% Buddhist, 0.6% New Age, and 3.7% other religions. People who answered that they had no religion were 48.3%, and 6.5% of people did not answer the census question.

Of those at least 15 years old, 687 (19.3%) people had a bachelor's or higher degree, 1,872 (52.6%) had a post-high school certificate or diploma, and 1,005 (28.2%) people exclusively held high school qualifications. 240 people (6.7%) earned over $100,000 compared to 12.1% nationally. The employment status of those at least 15 was 1,791 (50.3%) full-time, 447 (12.6%) part-time, and 96 (2.7%) unemployed.

Individual statistical areas
| Name | Area (km^{2}) | Population | Density (per km^{2}) | Dwellings | Median age | Median income |
|---|---|---|---|---|---|---|
| Queens Square | 0.60 | 1,944 | 3,240 | 804 | 36.9 years | $42,400 |
| Parkvale | 1.30 | 2,331 | 1,793 | 999 | 46.0 years | $34,100 |
| New Zealand | | | | | 38.1 years | $41,500 |

== Education ==
Parkvale School is a co-educational Year 1-6 state primary school, with a roll of 502 as of July 2026. The school opened in 1919.

Te Kura Kaupapa Māori o Te Wānanga Whare Tapere o Takitimu is a co-educational state Māori immersion composite school, with a roll of 273 as of July 2026. Te Wānanga Whare Tapere o Takitimu was founded in 1983.

Karamu High School is a co-educational state secondary school, with a roll of 900 as of July 2026. The school opened in 1962.

== Gallery ==
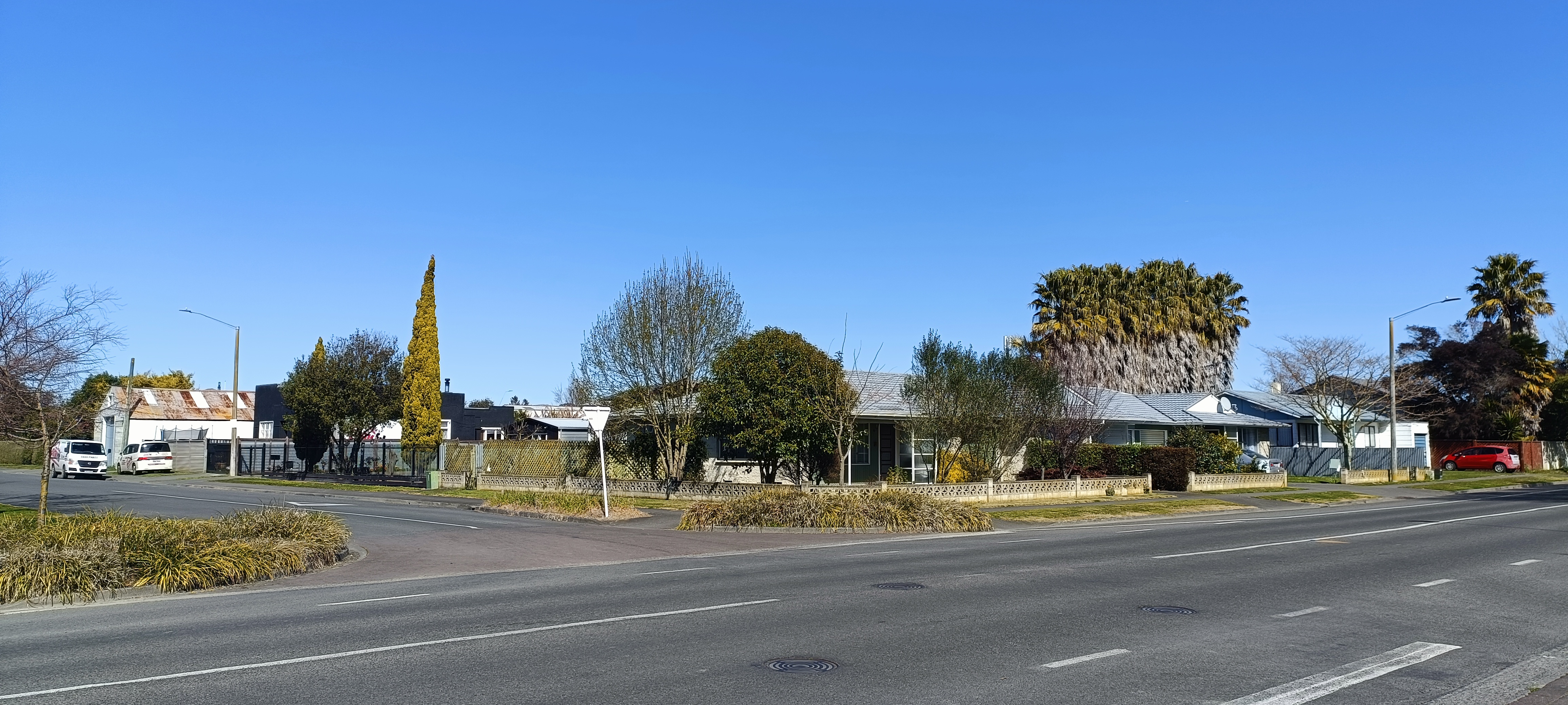

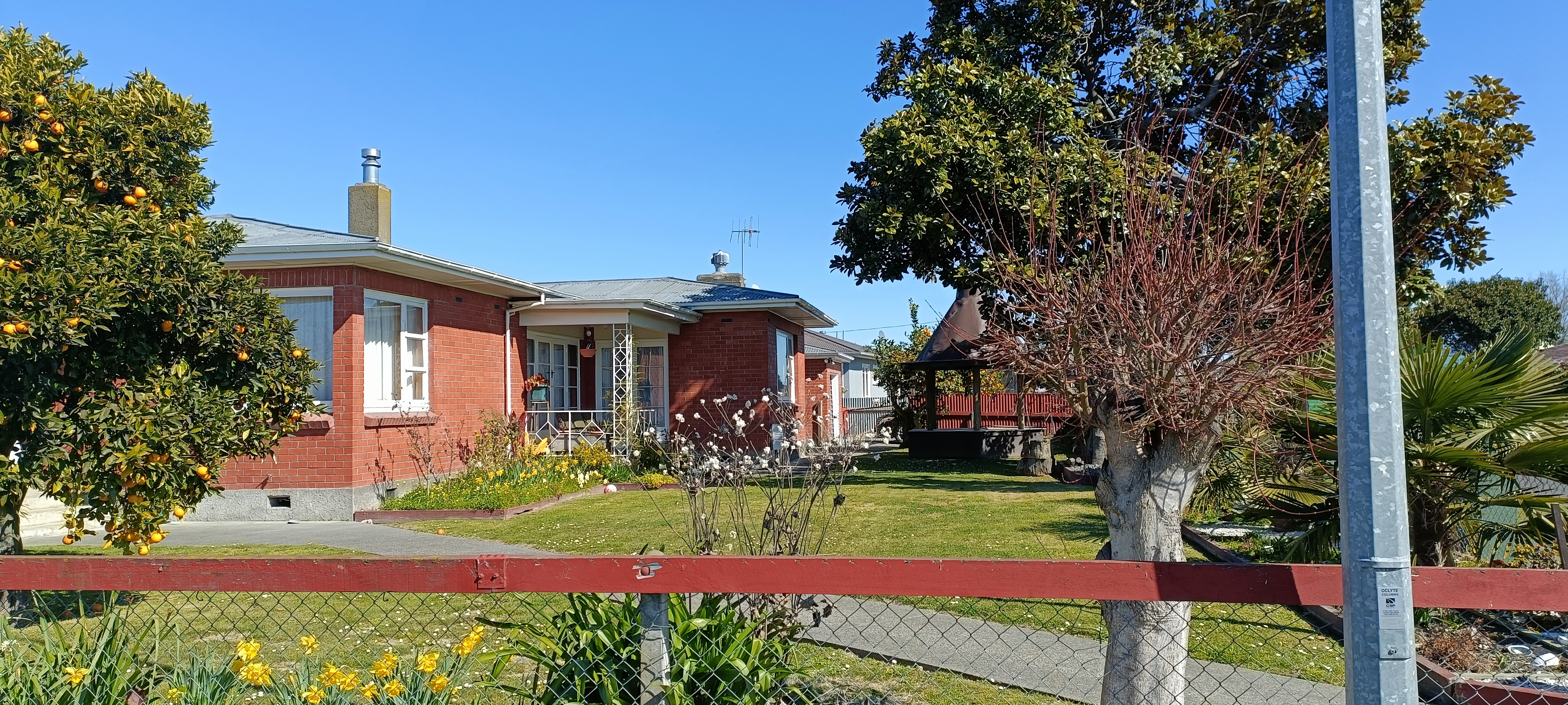

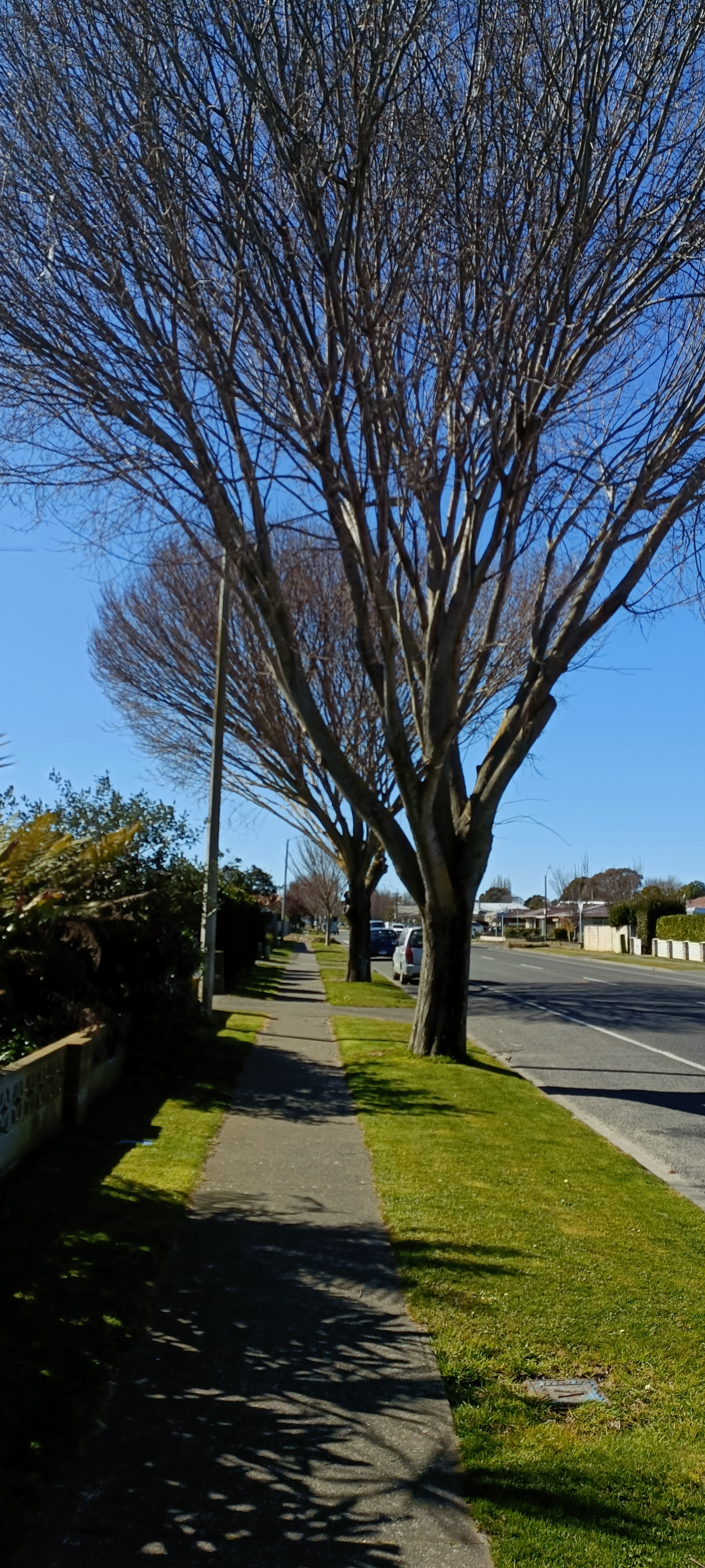

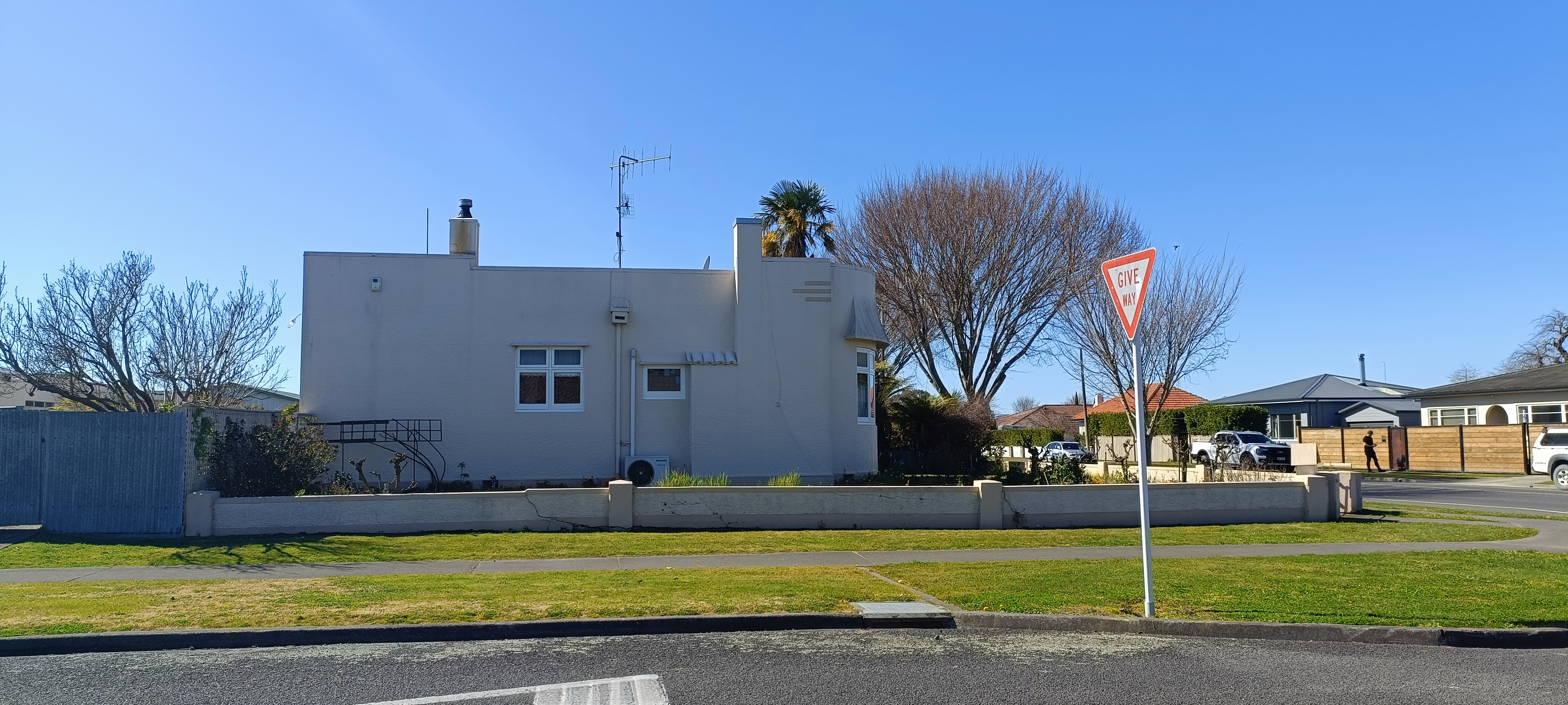
