= Chrissy Witoko =

New Zealand business owner (1944–2002)

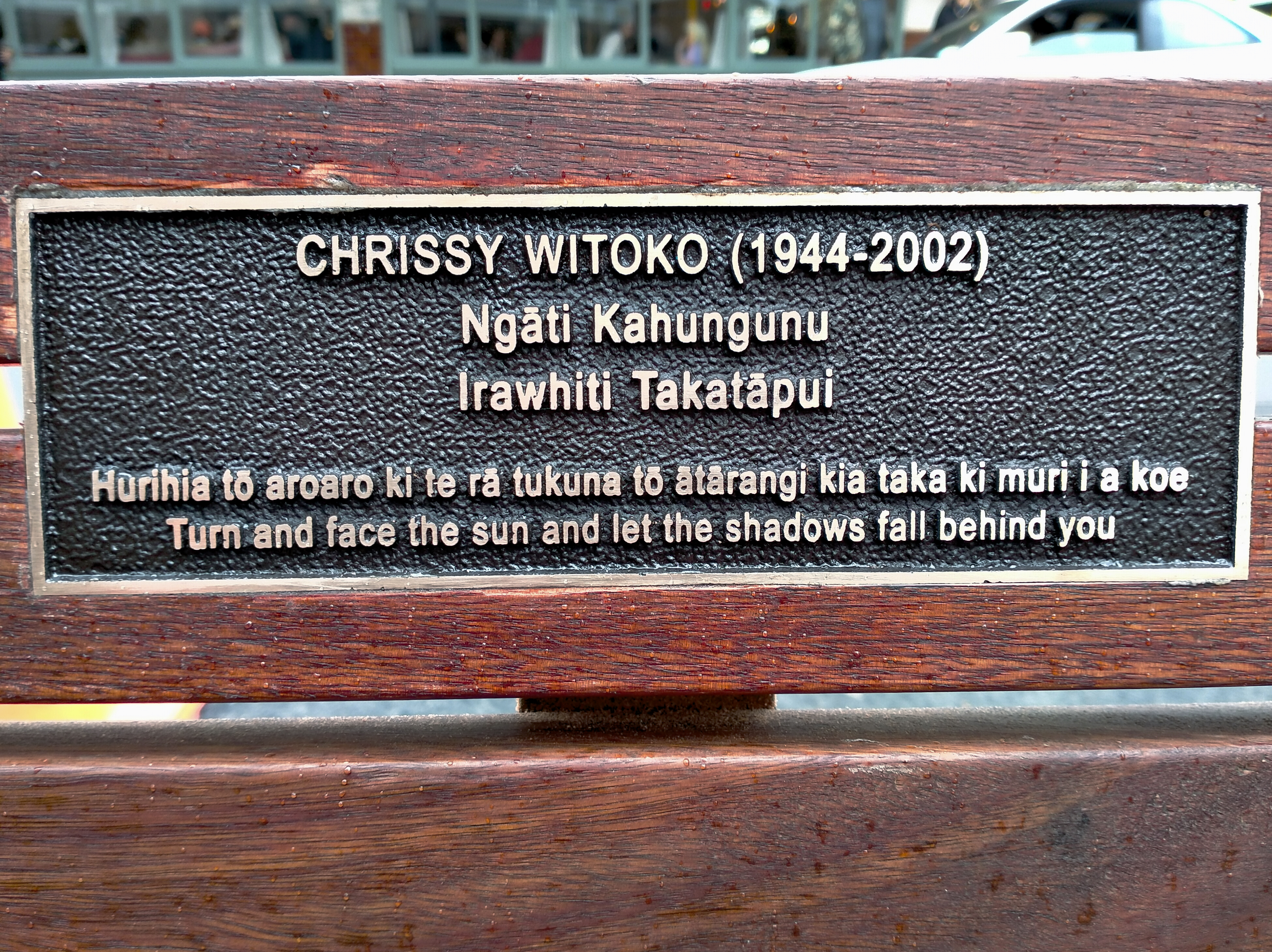
- Plaque commemorating Witoko in Wellington, New Zealand
- Born: 11 September 1944; Hastings, New Zealand
- Died: 5 November 2002 (aged 58); Wellington, New Zealand
- Occupation: Business owner

Chrissy Witoko (11 September 1944 – 5 November 2002) was a business owner and prominent figure in New Zealand's LGBTQIA+ community. She was known for establishing and operating the Evergreen Coffee Lounge.

== Early life and family ==
Witoko was born in Hastings, New Zealand on 11 September 1944.

She was of Ngāti Kahungunu descent.

== Career ==
Witoko moved to Wellington in 1950 and worked in various clubs and cafes.

In 1984, Witoko established the Evergreen Coffee Lounge on Vivian Street. The site had previously been a coffee lounge run by Carmen Rupe. The Evergreen Coffee Lounge became a prominent meeting space for Wellington's LGBTQIA+ community. It has since been noted that Witoko's coffee lounge was a "safe space" in an era before gay and transgender law reforms. It also served as meeting point for protest, and a drop-in center, particularly for sex workers needing shelter.

Witoko received several awards for her work including a Glammie's Award for community service, and an Alfie's award for personality of the year.

== Personal life ==
Witoko was an openly transgender woman. She had a partner called Andrew and helped raise his son, Nikora.

Witoko died in Wellington on 5 November 2002 and the Evergreen Coffee Lounge was closed shortly thereafter.

== Legacy ==
Wikoto's coffee lounge was known for its photo collages. These have been preserved and are within the collection of Te Papa.

In 2003, following Wikoto's death, the After Life Memorial Trust was renamed the Chrissy Witoko Memorial Trust. The main focus of the trust was originally to provide dignified funerals for those with HIV/AIDS, but it has since widened its scope to a range of LGBTQIA+ support systems.

In 2022, a park bench was erected in Witoko's memory on the corner of Vivian Street and Cuba Street, Wellington.
