= Ākina, New Zealand =

Suburb of Hastings, New Zealand

Ākina
- Suburb
- Interactive map of Ākina
- Coordinates: 39.651266°S 176.845557°E
- Country: New Zealand
- City: Hastings
- Local authority: Hastings District Council
- Electoral ward: Hastings-Havelock North General Ward; Takitimu Māori Ward

Area
  - Land: 205 ha (510 acres)

Population (June 2025)
  - Total: 5,490
  - Density: 2,680/km^{2} (6,940/sq mi)

Raureka	Hastings Central
	Ākina	Parkvale
Longlands	Pukahu	Havelock North

Ākina is a suburb of Hastings City, in the Hawke's Bay Region of New Zealand's North Island.

The suburb includes Akina Park, Hawke's Bay soccer and softball park.

== Demographics ==
Ākina covers 2.05 km^{2} (0.79 sq mi) and had an estimated population of 5,490 as of June 2025, with a population density of 2,678 people per km^{2}.

Historical population
Year	Pop.	±% p.a.
2006	4,626	—
2013	4,824	+0.60%
2018	5,190	+1.47%
2023	5,244	+0.21%

Ākina had a population of 5,244 in the 2023 New Zealand census, an increase of 54 people (1.0%) since the 2018 census, and an increase of 420 people (8.7%) since the 2013 census. There were 2,472 males, 2,754 females, and 15 people of other genders in 2,031 dwellings. 2.7% of people identified as LGBTIQ+. The median age was 35.2 years (compared with 38.1 years nationally). There were 1,095 people (20.9%) aged under 15 years, 1,056 (20.1%) aged 15 to 29, 2,373 (45.3%) aged 30 to 64, and 720 (13.7%) aged 65 or older.

People could identify as more than one ethnicity. The results were 70.5% European (Pākehā); 27.2% Māori; 5.3% Pasifika; 13.5% Asian; 1.1% Middle Eastern, Latin American and African New Zealanders (MELAA); and 2.6% other, which includes people giving their ethnicity as "New Zealander". English was spoken by 95.4%, Māori by 5.4%, Samoan by 1.0%, and other languages by 12.1%. No language could be spoken by 2.6% (e.g. too young to talk). New Zealand Sign Language was known by 0.3%. The percentage of people born overseas was 20.0, compared with 28.8% nationally.

Religious affiliations were 31.5% Christian, 3.2% Hindu, 0.8% Islam, 2.3% Māori religious beliefs, 0.6% Buddhist, 0.6% New Age, 0.1% Jewish, and 3.4% other religions. People who answered that they had no religion were 51.4%, and 6.2% of people did not answer the census question.

Of those at least 15 years old, 771 (18.6%) people had a bachelor's or higher degree, 2,250 (54.2%) had a post-high school certificate or diploma, and 1,131 (27.3%) people exclusively held high school qualifications. The median income was $41,100, compared with $41,500 nationally. 195 people (4.7%) earned over $100,000 compared to 12.1% nationally. The employment status of those at least 15 was 2,286 (55.1%) full-time, 483 (11.6%) part-time, and 96 (2.3%) unemployed.

Individual statistical areas
Name	Area (km^{2})	Population	Density (per km^{2})	Dwellings	Median age	Median income
Akina Park	1.03	2,265	2,199	924	36.3 years	$40,300
Parkhaven	1.02	2,979	2,921	1,107	34.3 years	$41,600
New Zealand					38.1 years	$41,500

== Education ==
Hastings Intermediate is a co-educational state intermediate school, serving Year 7–8, with a roll of 401 as of July 2026. The school opened in 1954.

Hastings Christian School is a co-educational Year 1–13 state-integrated Christian school, with a roll of 328 as of July 2026. It started in 1987 as a primary school, and bought its current site in 1992. It provided secondary education for years 9 and 10 from 1998, and expanded to cover up to year 13 by 2010.
