= Mayfair, New Zealand =

Suburb of Hastings, New Zealand

Mayfair
- Suburb
- Interactive map of Mayfair
- Coordinates: 39.635658°S 176.857177°E
- Country: New Zealand
- City: Hastings
- Local authority: Hastings District Council
- Electoral ward: Hastings-Havelock North General Ward; Takitimu Māori Ward

Area
  - Land: 191 ha (470 acres)

Population (June 2025)
  - Total: 5,990
  - Density: 3,140/km^{2} (8,120/sq mi)

Mahora	Tomoana	Waipatu
Hastings Central	Mayfair	Karamu
Parkvale	Havelock North

Mayfair is a suburb of Hastings City, in the Hawke's Bay Region of New Zealand's North Island.

Nine streets in the suburb have poppies on their street signs to commemorate New Zealanders who served in international conflicts.

== Demographics ==
Mayfair covers 1.91 km^{2} (0.74 sq mi) and had an estimated population of 5,990 as of June 2025, with a population density of 3,136 people per km^{2}.

Historical population
Year	Pop.	±% p.a.
2006	4,938	—
2013	4,950	+0.03%
2018	5,481	+2.06%
2023	5,700	+0.79%

Mayfair had a population of 5,700 in the 2023 New Zealand census, an increase of 219 people (4.0%) since the 2018 census, and an increase of 750 people (15.2%) since the 2013 census. There were 2,736 males, 2,934 females, and 27 people of other genders in 1,959 dwellings. 2.5% of people identified as LGBTIQ+. There were 1,263 people (22.2%) aged under 15 years, 1,197 (21.0%) aged 15 to 29, 2,418 (42.4%) aged 30 to 64, and 822 (14.4%) aged 65 or older.

People could identify as more than one ethnicity. The results were 65.8% European (Pākehā); 34.2% Māori; 9.5% Pasifika; 9.4% Asian; 1.1% Middle Eastern, Latin American and African New Zealanders (MELAA); and 1.9% other, which includes people giving their ethnicity as "New Zealander". English was spoken by 95.9%, Māori by 8.3%, Samoan by 2.7%, and other languages by 9.7%. No language could be spoken by 1.9% (e.g. too young to talk). New Zealand Sign Language was known by 0.6%. The percentage of people born overseas was 17.2, compared with 28.8% nationally.

Religious affiliations were 34.1% Christian, 1.5% Hindu, 0.9% Islam, 3.5% Māori religious beliefs, 0.7% Buddhist, 0.3% New Age, 0.1% Jewish, and 2.3% other religions. People who answered that they had no religion were 50.1%, and 6.7% of people did not answer the census question.

Of those at least 15 years old, 666 (15.0%) people had a bachelor's or higher degree, 2,448 (55.2%) had a post-high school certificate or diploma, and 1,323 (29.8%) people exclusively held high school qualifications. 219 people (4.9%) earned over $100,000 compared to 12.1% nationally. The employment status of those at least 15 was 2,388 (53.8%) full-time, 522 (11.8%) part-time, and 120 (2.7%) unemployed.

Individual statistical areas
Name	Area (km^{2})	Population	Density (per km^{2})	Dwellings	Median age	Median income
Tomoana Crossing	0.84	2,559	3,046	921	37.2 years	$42,900
Mayfair	1.07	3,141	2,936	1,038	32.8 years	$37,700
New Zealand					38.1 years	$41,500

== Education ==
Mayfair School is a co-educational state primary school, with a roll of 221 as of July 2026. The school opened in 1950.

St John's College is a co-educational state primary school, with a roll of 406 as of July 2026. The school was founded in 1941.
