= Mangateretere =

Settlement in Hawke's Bay Region, New Zealand

- Rural community
- Interactive map of Mangateretere
- Coordinates: 39.619°S 176.893°E
- Country: New Zealand
- Region: Hawke's Bay
- Territorial authority: Hastings District
- Ward: Heretaunga General Ward; Kahurānaki General Ward; Takitimu Māori Ward
- Electorates: Tukituki; Ikaroa-Rāwhiti (Māori)

Government
  - Territorial Authority: Hastings District Council
  - Regional council: Hawke's Bay Regional Council
  - Mayor of Hastings: Wendy Schollum
  - Tukituki MP: Catherine Wedd
  - Ikaroa-Rāwhiti MP: Cushla Tangaere-Manuel
- Postcode(s): 4180

Mangateretere is a rural community in the Hastings District and Hawke's Bay Region of New Zealand's North Island. The area is northeast of Hastings city and southwest of Clive.

== History ==
The area was the Mangateretere Block in the 1860s. 1,253 acres (507 ha) of this constituted the Mangateretere West Block which the Native Lands Court granted to Māori owners (including Karaitiana Takamoana) in 1866, and most of which were subsequently leased to a local farmer. The Mangateretere East Block was a further 2,047 acres (828 ha). Ownership of the blocks passed to the local farmer about 1869 in what appears to be a transaction where not all parties gave informed consent. This was one of the transactions objected to by the Hawke's Bay Repudiation Movement of the 1870s. At least part of the land was returned to Māori in 1883.

== Demographics ==
Mangateretere statistical area covers 39.94 km^{2} (15.42 sq mi) and had an estimated population of 1,460 as of June 2025, with a population density of 37 people per km^{2}.

Historical population
Year	Pop.	±% p.a.
2006	981	—
2013	1,245	+3.46%
2018	1,362	+1.81%
2023	1,425	+0.91%
The 2006 population is for a smaller area of 37.22 km^{2}. Source:

Mangateretere had a population of 1,425 in the 2023 New Zealand census, an increase of 63 people (4.6%) since the 2018 census, and an increase of 180 people (14.5%) since the 2013 census. There were 723 males, 699 females, and 3 people of other genders in 504 dwellings. 2.3% of people identified as LGBTIQ+. The median age was 46.6 years (compared with 38.1 years nationally). There were 261 people (18.3%) aged under 15 years, 186 (13.1%) aged 15 to 29, 654 (45.9%) aged 30 to 64, and 321 (22.5%) aged 65 or older.

People could identify as more than one ethnicity. The results were 90.1% European (Pākehā); 12.8% Māori; 2.5% Pasifika; 2.9% Asian; 0.4% Middle Eastern, Latin American and African New Zealanders (MELAA); and 3.2% other, which includes people giving their ethnicity as "New Zealander". English was spoken by 98.5%, Māori by 2.7%, Samoan by 0.8%, and other languages by 8.0%. No language could be spoken by 1.1% (e.g. too young to talk). New Zealand Sign Language was known by 0.4%. The percentage of people born overseas was 17.9, compared with 28.8% nationally.

Religious affiliations were 37.1% Christian, 0.6% Hindu, 0.2% Islam, 0.6% Māori religious beliefs, 0.4% Buddhist, 0.4% New Age, and 1.3% other religions. People who answered that they had no religion were 54.7%, and 5.9% of people did not answer the census question.

Of those at least 15 years old, 363 (31.2%) people had a bachelor's or higher degree, 618 (53.1%) had a post-high school certificate or diploma, and 183 (15.7%) people exclusively held high school qualifications. The median income was $47,100, compared with $41,500 nationally. 207 people (17.8%) earned over $100,000 compared to 12.1% nationally. The employment status of those at least 15 was 555 (47.7%) full-time, 222 (19.1%) part-time, and 18 (1.5%) unemployed.

== Education ==
Mangateretere School (also called Te Kura o Mangateretere) is a co-educational state full primary school providing education for years 1–8, with a roll of 36 as of July 2026. The school opened in 1903.
