= Camberley, New Zealand =

Suburb of Hastings, New Zealand

Camberley
- Suburb
- Interactive map of Camberley
- Coordinates: 39.628248°S 176.822187°E
- Country: New Zealand
- City: Hastings
- Local authority: Hastings District Council
- Electoral ward: Hastings-Havelock North General Ward; Takitimu Māori Ward
- Established: 1957

Area
  - Land: 93 ha (230 acres)

Population (June 2025)
  - Total: 2,420
  - Density: 2,600/km^{2} (6,700/sq mi)

Flaxmere	Twyford	Frimley
	Camberley	Mahora
Longlands	Raureka	St Leonards

Camberley is a suburb of Hastings City, in the Hawke's Bay Region of New Zealand's North Island.

The fertile lands were added to the Hastings city boundary in 1957 to address a shortage of land.

== Demographics ==
Camberley covers 0.93 km^{2} (0.36 sq mi) and had an estimated population of 2,420 as of June 2025, with a population density of 2,602 people per km^{2}.

Historical population
Year	Pop.	±% p.a.
2006	2,055	—
2013	1,917	−0.99%
2018	2,196	+2.75%
2023	2,403	+1.82%

Camberley had a population of 2,403 in the 2023 New Zealand census, an increase of 207 people (9.4%) since the 2018 census, and an increase of 486 people (25.4%) since the 2013 census. There were 1,188 males, 1,206 females, and 12 people of other genders in 687 dwellings. 2.0% of people identified as LGBTIQ+. The median age was 30.1 years (compared with 38.1 years nationally). There were 621 people (25.8%) aged under 15 years, 579 (24.1%) aged 15 to 29, 924 (38.5%) aged 30 to 64, and 285 (11.9%) aged 65 or older.

People could identify as more than one ethnicity. The results were 39.7% European (Pākehā); 54.6% Māori; 20.6% Pasifika; 6.1% Asian; 0.4% Middle Eastern, Latin American and African New Zealanders (MELAA); and 0.5% other, which includes people giving their ethnicity as "New Zealander". English was spoken by 93.3%, Māori by 15.1%, Samoan by 8.1%, and other languages by 8.0%. No language could be spoken by 2.9% (e.g. too young to talk). New Zealand Sign Language was known by 1.0%. The percentage of people born overseas was 14.4, compared with 28.8% nationally.

Religious affiliations were 38.8% Christian, 2.1% Hindu, 0.6% Islam, 8.0% Māori religious beliefs, 0.5% Buddhist, 0.2% New Age, 0.1% Jewish, and 2.0% other religions. People who answered that they had no religion were 44.6%, and 4.7% of people did not answer the census question.

Of those at least 15 years old, 108 (6.1%) people had a bachelor's or higher degree, 957 (53.7%) had a post-high school certificate or diploma, and 717 (40.2%) people exclusively held high school qualifications. The median income was $32,300, compared with $41,500 nationally. 36 people (2.0%) earned over $100,000 compared to 12.1% nationally. The employment status of those at least 15 was 780 (43.8%) full-time, 225 (12.6%) part-time, and 111 (6.2%) unemployed.

== Education ==
Camberley School is a state primary school, with a roll of 67. It was originally called Frimley South School and became Camberley School by 1968.

Heretaunga Intermediate is a state intermediate school, with a roll of 262. It opened in 1960.

Both schools are co-educational. Rolls are as of July 2026.
