= Hastings Girls' High School =

Coordinates: 39.6264°S 176.8345°E

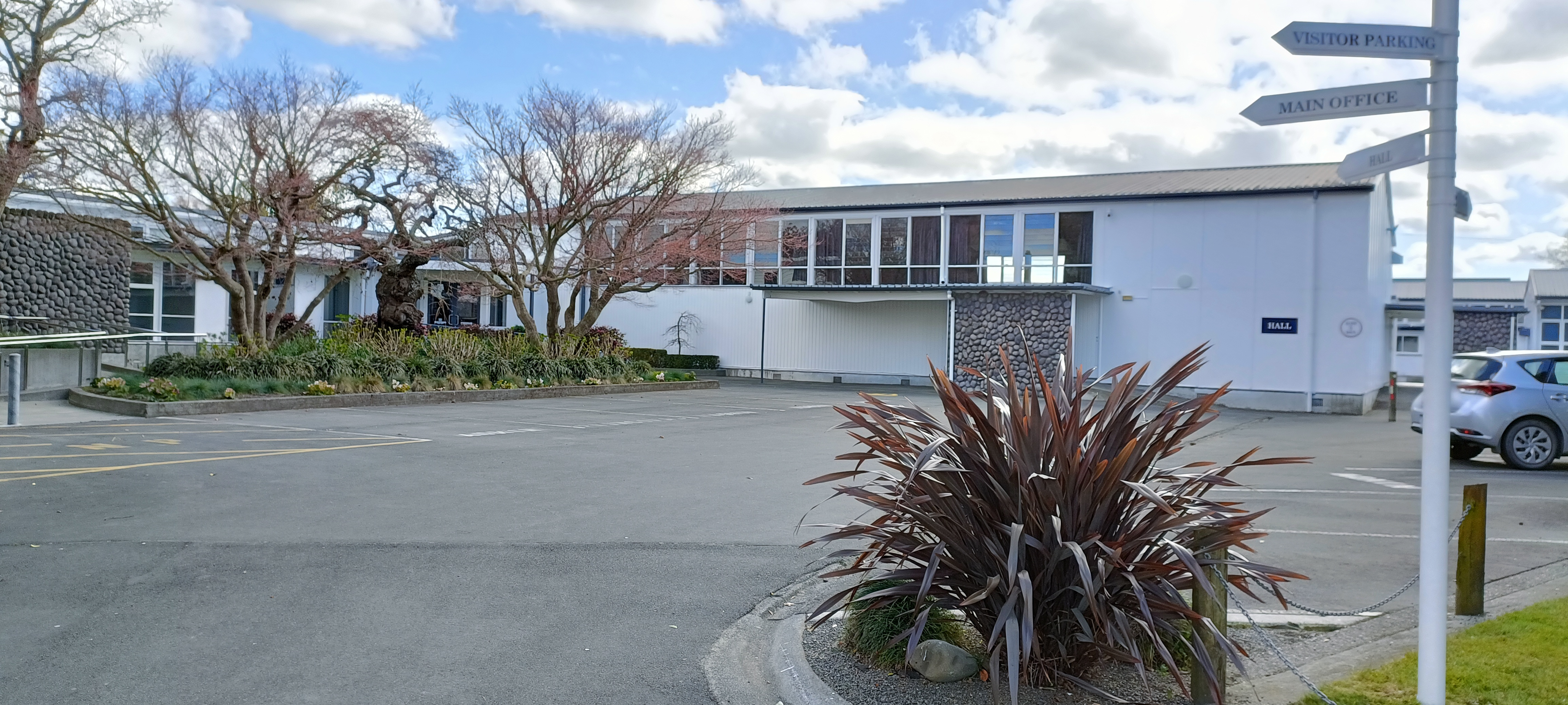

Location
- Pakowhai Road, Hastings, New Zealand

Information
- Type: State single-sex girls, secondary (Year 9–13)
- Motto: Akina
- Established: mid 1950s
- Ministry of Education Institution no.: 228
- Principal: Lisa Akers
- Enrolment: 525 (July 2026)
- Socio-economic decile: 3

Hastings Girls' High School is a girls' high school in Hastings, New Zealand for students in years 9 to 13. The school is the main all-female secondary school within Hastings City. It was originally a co-ed school, joined with Hastings Boys' High School, until the mid 1950s, when they split into two single-sex schools. Hastings Girls' High School has four houses: gold, purple, blue and green. They share an emblem with Hastings Boys' High School; the huia bird.

== Enrolment ==
As of July 2026, Hastings Girls' High School has a roll of 525 students, of which 226 (43.0%) identify as Māori.

As of 2026, the school has an Equity Index of 514, placing it amongst schools whose students have many socioeconomic barriers to achievement (roughly equivalent to decile 2 and 3 under the former socio-economic decile system).
