= Hastings, New Zealand =

City in Hawke's Bay, New Zealand

Hastings Heretaunga (Māori)
- City
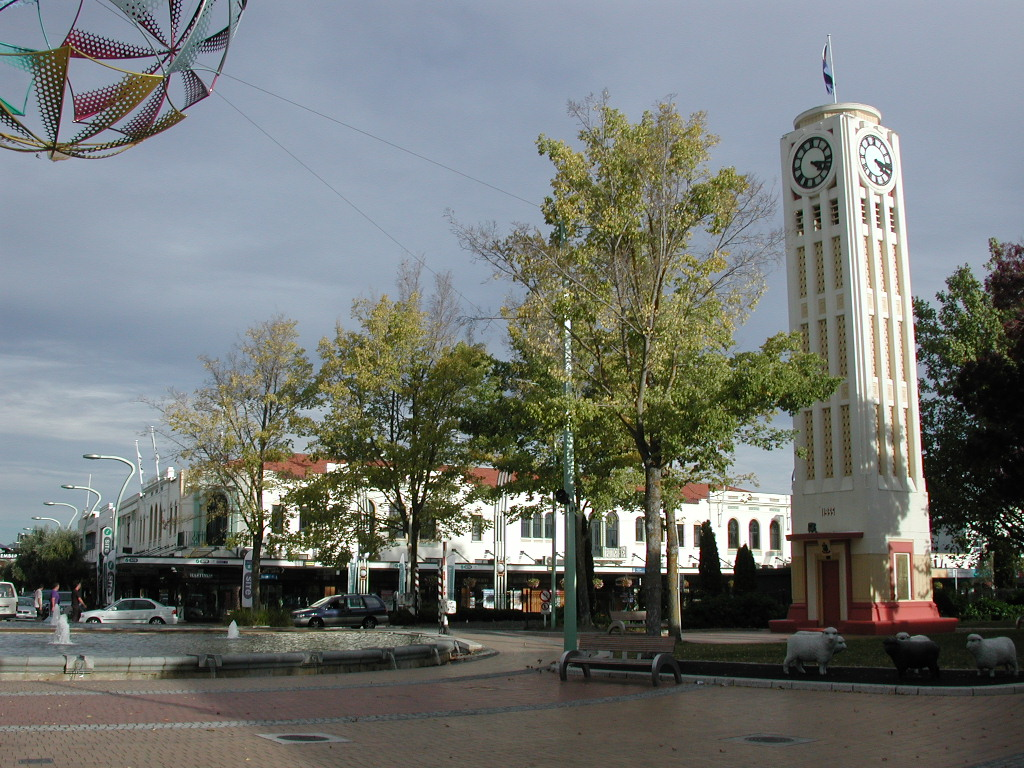
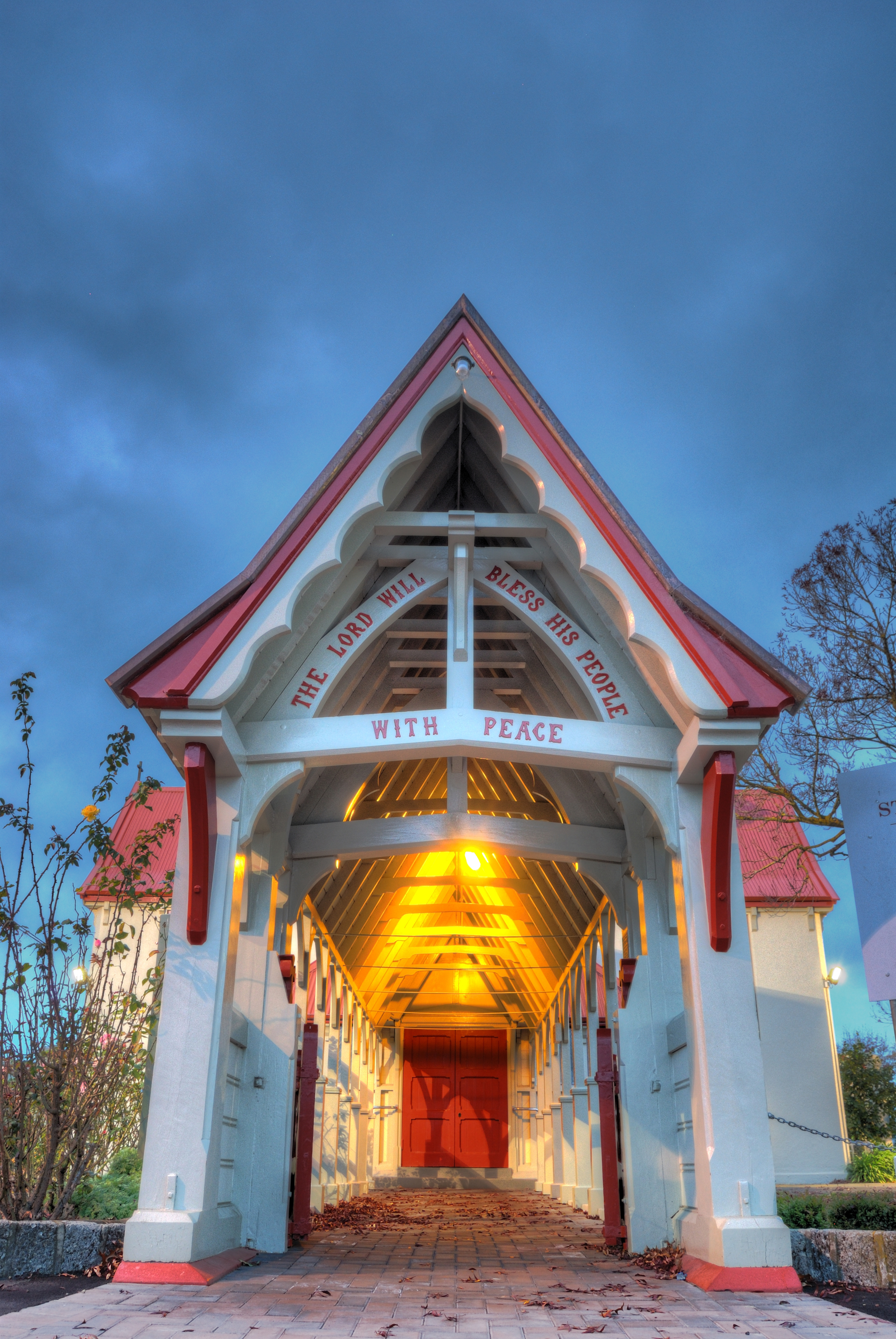
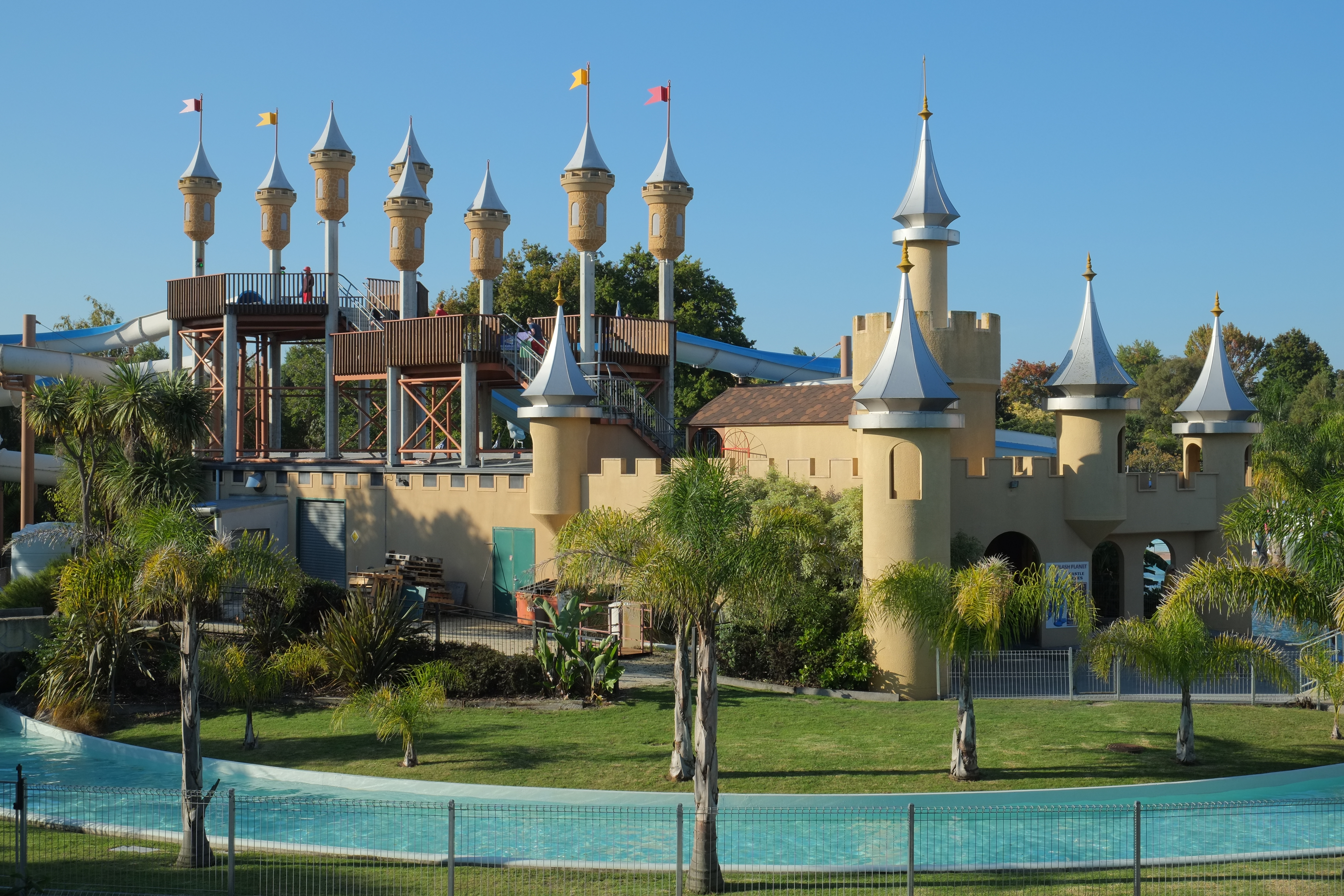
- View from Te Mata Peak Hastings Clock Tower in Central Plaza Ngā Pou o Heretaunga St Matthew's Church Splash Planet Heretaunga Street
- Nickname: The 'Stings
- Motto(s): Urbis Et Ruris Concordia (Town and Country in Harmony)
- Location in New Zealand Location in Oceania Location in the Pacific Ocean
- Coordinates: 39°38′30″S 176°50′40″E
- Country: New Zealand
- Island: North Island
- Region: Hawke's Bay
- District: Hastings District
- Settled by Māori: c. 14th century
- Settled by Europeans: c. 19th century

Government
  - Territorial authority: Hastings District Council
  - Mayor: Wendy Schollum
  - Deputy Mayor: Michael Fowler

Area
  - District: 5,226.62 km^{2} (2,018.01 sq mi)
  - Urban: 26.29 km^{2} (10.15 sq mi)
- Elevation: 11 m (36 ft)

Population (June 2025)
  - District: 88,300
  - Density: 16.9/km^{2} (43.8/sq mi)
  - Urban: 49,800
  - Urban density: 1,890/km^{2} (4,910/sq mi)
- Postcode(s): 4120, 4122
- Website: hastingsdc.govt.nz

Hastings (/ˈheɪstɪŋz/; Māori: Heretaunga, Māori pronunciation: [hɛɾɛˈtaʉŋa]) is a city in New Zealand and one of the two major urban areas in Hawke's Bay, on the east coast of the North Island. The population of Hastings (including Flaxmere) is 49,800 (as of June 2025), with a further 15,000 people in Havelock North and 2,040 in Clive. Hastings is about 18 kilometres south of the coastal city of Napier. These two neighbouring cities are often called "The Bay Cities" or "The Twin Cities".

The city is the administrative centre of the Hastings District. Since the merger of the surrounding and satellite settlements, Hastings has grown to become one of the largest urban areas in Hawke's Bay.

Hastings District is a food production region. The fertile Heretaunga Plains surrounding the city produce stone fruits, pome fruit, kiwifruit and vegetables, and the area is one of New Zealand's major red wine producers. Associated business include food processing, agricultural services, rural finance and freight. Hastings is the major service centre for the surrounding inland pastoral communities and tourism.

== History ==
=== Māori history ===
Near the fourteenth century CE, Māori arrived in Heretaunga or Hawke's Bay, settling in the river valleys and along the coast where food was plentiful. It is believed that Māori arrived at Heretaunga by canoe, travelling down the coast from the north, landing at Wairoa, Portland Island, the Ahuriri Lagoon at Westshore, and at Waimārama. Their culture flourished, causing gradual deforestation of the land. The forest was replaced by bracken, making this one of the few regions of New Zealand where sheep could be brought in by later European settlers without felling the bush first. In the sixteenth century, Taraia, great-grandson of the great and prolific chief Kahungunu, established the large tribe of Ngāti Kahungunu, which eventually colonised the eastern side of the North Island from Poverty Bay to Wairarapa. They were one of the first Māori tribes to come in contact with European settlers.

=== European settlers' history ===
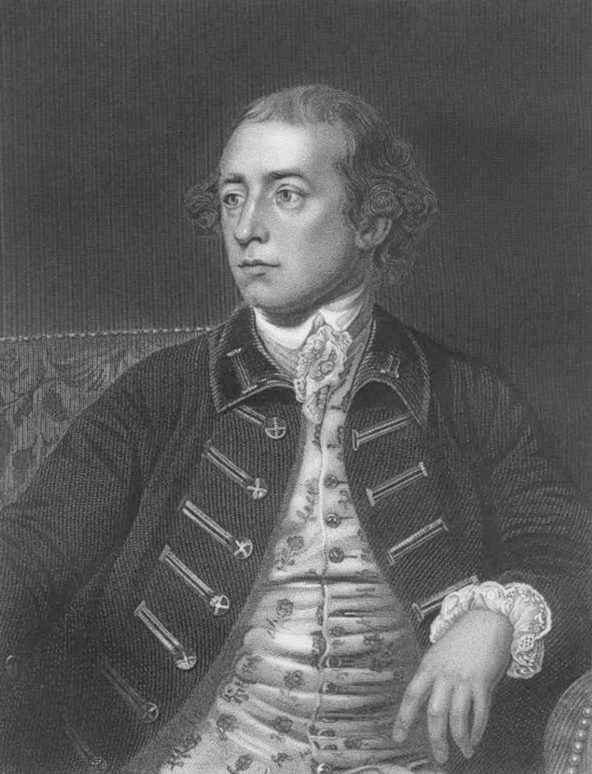
Warren Hastings in 1767/68

The Māori owners leased approximately seventy square kilometres on the Heretaunga Plains to Thomas Tanner in 1867; Tanner had been trying to purchase the land since 1864. In 1870, twelve people, known as the "12 apostles", formed a syndicate to purchase the land for around £1 10s an acre (£371 per km^{2}). Many local people firmly believe that Hastings was originally named Hicksville, after Francis Hicks, who bought a 100-acre (0.40 km^{2}) block of land, which now contains the centre of Hastings, from Thomas Tanner. However, this story is apocryphal. The original name of the location which was to become the town centre was Karamu.

In 1870, Colonial Treasurer Julius Vogel launched the most ambitious development programme in New Zealand’s history. He proposed to borrow huge sums from Britain to revitalise and accelerate New Zealand development. One of the leading projects was the building of a national railway linking all main centres. Hawkes Bay development involved building a railway south from Napier and eventually to Palmerston North where it would connect to the proposed main trunk line. The decision on the route out of Napier was based largely on two reports by Charles Weber, the provincial engineer and surveyor in charge of the railways. Francis Hicks owned land in the central in the Heretaunga Plains and offered to donate land for a railway station. The offer was accepted and in 1873 Francis Hicks subdivided 100 acres into residential and suburban sections. On 7 June 1873, the Hawke's Bay Herald reported: "The name of the new town is to be Hastings. We hear it now for the first time." Exactly who chose the name has been disputed, although Thomas Tanner claimed that it was him (see Hawke's Bay Herald report 1 February 1884) and that the choice was inspired by his reading the trial of Warren Hastings. In any event, the name fitted well with other place names in the district (Napier, Havelock and Clive), which were also named after prominent figures in the history of British India. In 1874, the first train took the twelve-mile (19 km) trip from Napier to Hastings, opening up Hastings as an export centre, through Port Ahuriri. Another big jump in the local economy occurred when Edward Newbigin opened a brewery in 1881. By the next year, there were 195 freeholders of land in the town of around six hundred people. The town was incorporated as a borough on 20 October 1886.

Hastings first received power in 1912, followed by Napier in 1915.

In 1918, nearly 300 people died of a flu epidemic that swept Hawke's Bay.

=== 1931 earthquake ===
On 3 February 1931, at 10:47 am, most of Hastings (and nearby Napier) was levelled by an earthquake measuring 7.8 on the Richter Scale. In Hastings, the ground subsided roughly 1 metre. The collapse of buildings and the ensuing fires killed 258 people, of which 93 were in Hastings. The centre of Hastings was destroyed in the earthquake, and was subsequently rebuilt in the Art Deco and Spanish Mission styles, which were both popular at that time. Due to quick thinking by residents and the Local Fire Department, Hastings did not suffer the extent of fire damage that Napier did. Most deaths were attributed to collapsing buildings, namely Roaches' Department Store in Heretaunga Street where 17 people died.

The Hastings Clock Tower was commissioned in 1934 by the Hastings Borough Council as a symbol of triumph over the adversity to celebrate the rebuild of Hastings. The design was by competition, which was won by local architect Sydney Chaplin. In 1995 the Hastings District Council added two memorial plaques to the base of tower in memory of those who died in the earthquake.

=== 1932 to 1999 ===
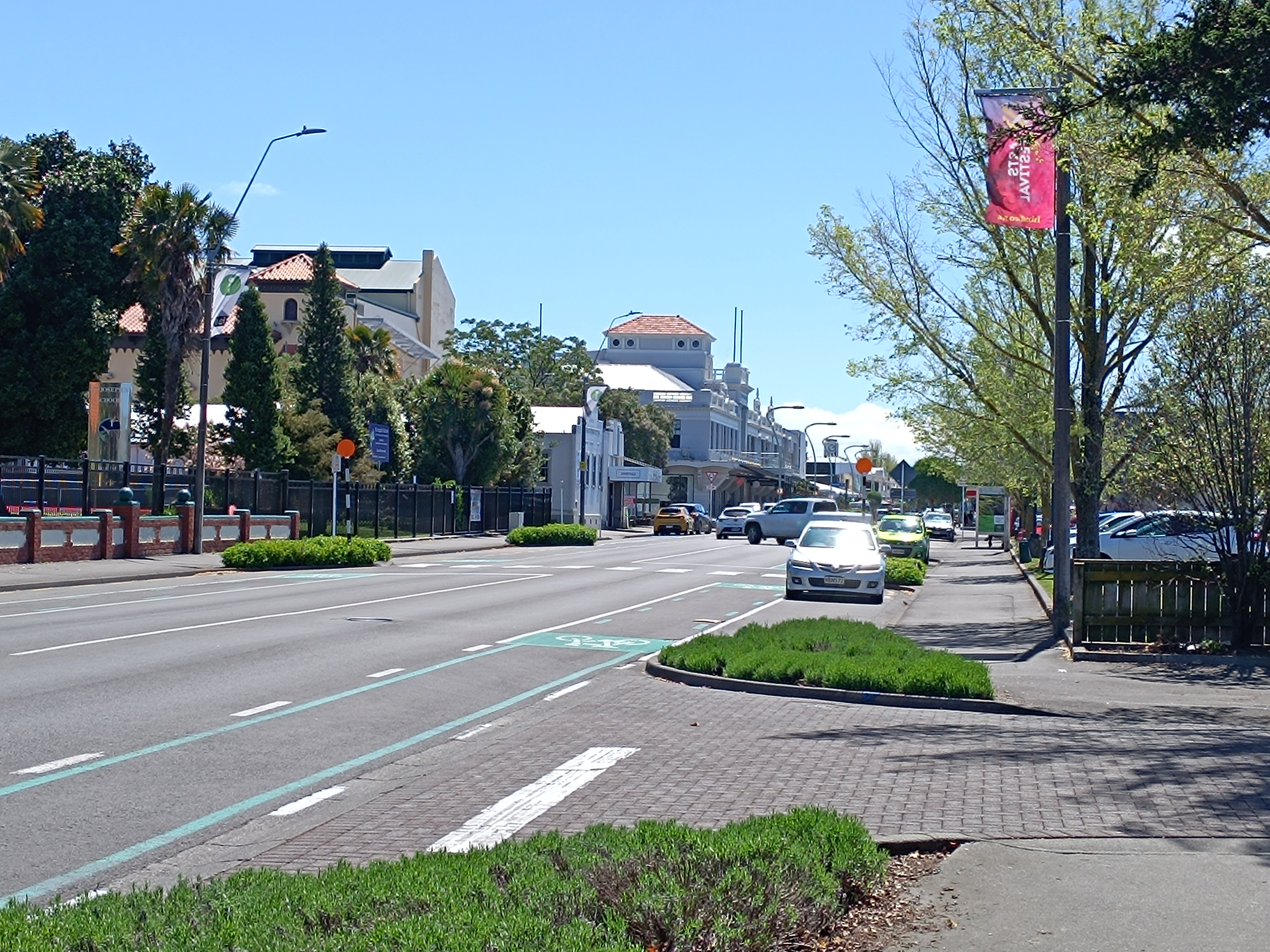
Looking down Heretaunga St E in the CBD

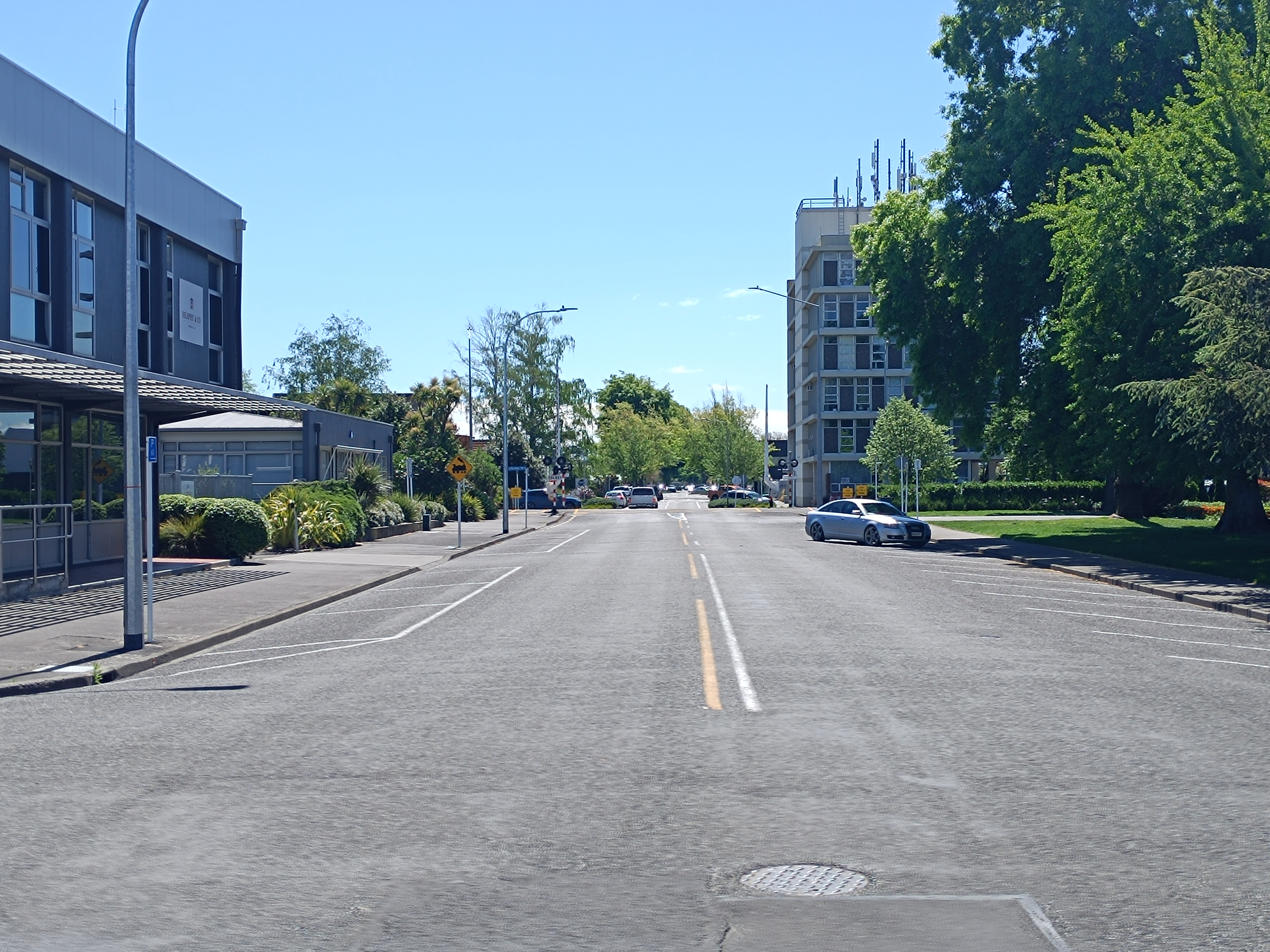
Looking down Lyndon Rd

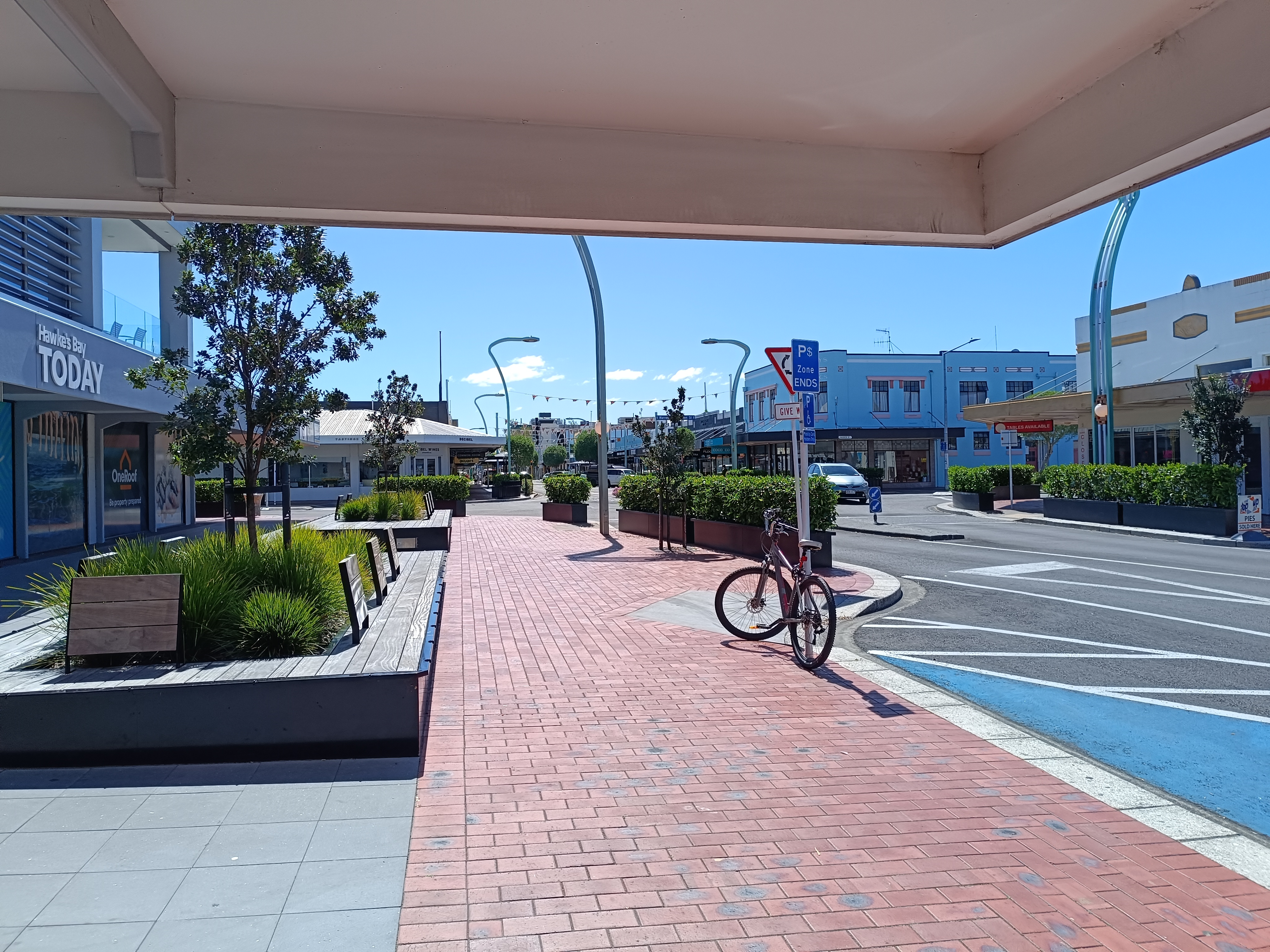
Looking down Heretaunga St E in the CBD

During World War II, Allied troops were billeted at the Army, Navy and Air Force (ANA) Club, and in private homes. One hundred and fifty members belonging to sixteen different local clubs packed supplies to be sent to Allied soldiers. In 1954, Hastings was the first city in New Zealand to introduce fluoridation of its water supply. The intention was to compare the effect on tooth decay with that in the unfluoridated city of Napier over a ten-year period. The study was criticised for its methodology and results, and remains controversial.

On 10 September 1960, the Hastings Blossom Parade (at the time a significant national event) was cancelled at 11 am for the first time in its history due to rain. Parade attendees drank in bars for several hours and when, subsequently, an 'impromptu' parade began at 2 pm, a riot started as police tried to arrest those intoxicated in public. This was considered a significant event in New Zealand society, with modern youth rebellion culture being labelled antisocial, and was subsequently much publicised with the national election later that year.

Hastings grew rapidly throughout the 1960s and 1970s (Hastings at this time was the fastest growing city in New Zealand), and there was a major issue dealing with encroachment of suburban expansion on highly productive land. Flaxmere was established as a satellite suburb to absorb rapid growth and was built upon the stony, arid soils of the abandoned course of the Ngaruroro River. Although the land seemed worthless back then, it has subsequently proved highly valued for grape growing, and now is a prized region of red wine varietals in the world-famous Gimblett Gravels wine-growing region. Starting with economic decline nationally in the late 1970s, coupled with agricultural subsidy reforms in the early 1980s, Hastings went into recession with more unemployment and low economic growth. It was not until the mid-1990s that the economy of Hastings began to turn around.

During the 1989 local government reforms Hastings City amalgamated with the Havelock North Borough and Hawke's Bay County to form the modern Hastings District. The County Council offices in Napier were closed in favour of Hastings, and the new Hastings District Council offices were built on two sites. The Napier City boundary was expanded to include Bay View and Meeanee. However, unlike largely urban Napier (population density 540.0 per km^{2}), much of the newly formed Hastings District is rural and sparsely populated (population density 14.0 per km^{2}), the Hastings District has approximately 88,300 (June 2025) residents.

Because of their proximity to each other and their relatively small populations, Hastings and Napier are often seen as candidates for further amalgamation. This was attempted with the 1999 Amalgamation Referendum, where 75% of Napier residents opposed, and 64% of Hastings residents were in support.

=== 2000 to today ===
At 11.25 pm on 25 August 2008, the city was hit by an earthquake measuring 5.9 on the Richter scale. The epicentre was based only 10 km south of the city, near Mount Erin, at a depth of 32 km. The earthquake caused minor damage to shops, where stock was shaken off shelves. Power outages were also reported. This was the most powerful earthquake to hit the region since the 5.8 Hastings earthquake in October 2001.

In 2010, the city, together with New Plymouth became one of the two walking and cycling "model communities", qualifying for further co-funding by the national government to improve its walking paths and cycleways, and encourage people to use active forms of transport.

In August–September 2016, 5,200 people fell ill after the local water supply in Havelock North tested positive for the pathogen Campylobacter jejeuni. One death in a nursing home was suspected to be due to the outbreak. It is suspected that after heavy rain fell on 5–6 August, water contamination from flooding caused the outbreak, although this is the subject of a government Inquiry. It is the largest outbreak of waterborne disease ever to occur in New Zealand. Schools in Havelock North closed for up to a week, with the Hastings District Council advising an urgent notice to boil water for at least one minute before consumption. This notice was lifted on 3 September, with the outbreak officially under control. Chlorination of the Havelock North water supply started on 12 August, and nine water tankers were brought in containing water from the Hastings water supply. One of these trucks again tested positive for E coli contamination, prompting the Hastings District Council to chlorinate the water supply of both Hastings and Flaxmere as a precautionary measure.

In November 2017, Sandra Hazlehurst, formerly Councilor for Hastings-Havelock North Ward, became the first woman Mayor of Hastings. Hazlehurst was elected as a result of a by-election triggered by the formal resignation of Mayor Lawrence Yule in June.

=== Timeline ===
- 1867: Māori owners leased 70 sq kilometres of land from the Heretaunga Plains to Thomas Tanner; it was the site of Karamu Junction.
- 1873: The town of Karamu Junction was officially renamed Hastings.
- 1874: Hastings (along with Napier) was connected to the North Island Main Trunk line.
- 1886: 20 October. Hastings town was incorporated as a borough.
- 1912: Hastings was connected to electricity, followed by Napier in 1915.
- 1914: Heretaunga Street is laid with stone for motor vehicle traffic.
- 1918: Nearly 300 people died of a flu epidemic that swept Hawke's Bay.
- 1931: 3 February. Hastings was rocked by a 7.8 magnitude earthquake, killing 256 people (93 in Hastings).
- 1932: 16 September. Hastings was rocked by a 6.9 magnitude earthquake. It was the final large earthquake in the 1931–1932 earthquake events.
- 1935: Hastings Clock Tower erected to celebrate the rebuild of Hastings post 1931 earthquake
- 1950: The first Blossom Parade was held in Hastings; it is now a popular annual event.
- 1951: 10 February. Hastings was rocked by a 6.1 magnitude earthquake at 3:27 pm.
- 1954: Hastings was the first city in New Zealand to introduce fluoridation of its water supply.
- 1960: 10 September. The Hastings Blossom Parade (at the time a significant national event) was cancelled at 11 am for the first time in its history due to rain.
- 1989: Hastings City and the Havelock North Borough amalgamated to form the modern-day Hastings District.
- 1993: 11 April. A 6.1 magnitude earthquake struck 15 km south-west of Hastings and was felt as far south as Christchurch.
- 2008: 25 August. A 5.9 magnitude earthquake centred 10 km south of Hastings caused an estimated $5 million in damage.
- 2010: The city became a walking and cycling "model community".
- 2016: August and September. 5,200 residents fell ill with campylobacteriosis, prompting a district-wide health crisis. It was the largest outbreak of waterborne disease to ever occur in New Zealand.
- 2023: 12–18 February. Cyclone Gabrielle severely impacts Hastings, claiming the lives of 7 people in Hastings District. Multiple rivers burst their banks, destroying 6 bridges and causing an estimated $13 billion NZD in damage.

== Geography and climate ==
Located on New Zealand's east coast, to the east of the Central Plateau and in the rain shadow of the Kaweka Ranges, Hastings is situated on the fertile alluvial Heretaunga Plains. The plains were originally covered in swamp and mangroves, but have since been drained for agriculture. The local area is very productive, with orchards, farms and vineyards, and lies upon New Zealand's most economically valuable aquifer. Hastings lies roughly 250 km north-east of the nation's capital Wellington (294 km by road) and 350 km south-east of the largest city, Auckland (429 km by road).

Hastings enjoys an oceanic climate (according to Köppen climate classification). Sunshine hours rank over 2200 annually while rainfall averages less than 800 mm (31.5 in). It is one of the country's warmest urban areas annually. Because of its location a little inland, the sea breeze has less effect on the climate than it does in Napier. It is not uncommon for the temperature to be in the low 30 °C's (90 °F) on summer days, while in winter, days of 15 °C+ (60 °F) are frequent, occasionally exceeding 20 °C (68 °F) with north-west winds. Winters tend to be quite still and crisp with frequent frosts, followed by bright, sunny days.

Climate data for Hastings
Month	Jan	Feb	Mar	Apr	May	Jun	Jul	Aug	Sep	Oct	Nov	Dec	Year
Record high °C (°F)	36.6 (97.9)	37.1 (98.8)	33.4 (92.1)	31.1 (88.0)	28.1 (82.6)	25.7 (78.3)	23.9 (75.0)	24.9 (76.8)	27.7 (81.9)	32.1 (89.8)	33.9 (93.0)	36.5 (97.7)	37.1 (98.8)
Mean daily maximum °C (°F)	25.5 (77.9)	25.4 (77.7)	23.6 (74.5)	20.7 (69.3)	17.1 (62.8)	14.4 (57.9)	13.9 (57.0)	14.9 (58.8)	17.5 (63.5)	20.0 (68.0)	22.3 (72.1)	24.1 (75.4)	20.0 (68.0)
Daily mean °C (°F)	19.6 (67.3)	19.7 (67.5)	17.9 (64.2)	14.9 (58.8)	11.9 (53.4)	9.2 (48.6)	8.8 (47.8)	9.9 (49.8)	11.8 (53.2)	14.0 (57.2)	16.4 (61.5)	18.4 (65.1)	14.4 (57.9)
Mean daily minimum °C (°F)	13.7 (56.7)	14.0 (57.2)	12.2 (54.0)	9.1 (48.4)	6.7 (44.1)	3.9 (39.0)	3.6 (38.5)	4.8 (40.6)	6.1 (43.0)	8.0 (46.4)	10.4 (50.7)	12.6 (54.7)	8.8 (47.8)
Record low °C (°F)	2.8 (37.0)	2.4 (36.3)	0.0 (32.0)	−3.0 (26.6)	−5.6 (21.9)	−5.9 (21.4)	−5.0 (23.0)	−3.9 (25.0)	−3.3 (26.1)	−3.1 (26.4)	−1.1 (30.0)	2.2 (36.0)	−5.9 (21.4)
Average precipitation mm (inches)	66 (2.6)	53 (2.1)	61 (2.4)	48 (1.9)	81 (3.2)	79 (3.1)	64 (2.5)	86 (3.4)	46 (1.8)	46 (1.8)	41 (1.6)	53 (2.1)	724 (28.5)
Mean monthly sunshine hours	249.3	202.6	201.7	172.4	155.6	130.7	134.7	166.8	181.2	213.9	216.2	233.7	2,258.7
Source: NIWA Climate Data

== Demographics ==
Due to restrictions on encroachment of land, satellite suburbs have absorbed the residential expansion of the city. Compared to other cities of similar size, Hastings has grown relatively quickly since it was settled in 1864 (over 150 years ago). Hastings is known for its gridiron city planning system, crisscrossed by the railway line running northeast–southwest and the main southeast–northwest artery, Heretaunga Street, which also links the city with its suburban centres of Havelock North and Flaxmere.

Many Hastings residents work in the city, and the area is populated by middle-to-upper income families, particularly in Havelock North and then middle-to-lower income families in other areas, namely Camberley and the north end of Flaxmere.

Stats NZ describes Hastings as a large urban area, which covers 26.29 km^{2} (10.15 sq mi) and had an estimated population of 49,800 as of June 2025, with a population density of 1,894 people per km^{2}.

Historical population
Year	Pop.	±% p.a.
2013	40,050	—
2018	45,075	+2.39%
2023	47,682	+1.13%

Hastings had a population of 47,682 in the 2023 New Zealand census, an increase of 2,607 people (5.8%) since the 2018 census, and an increase of 7,632 people (19.1%) since the 2013 census. There were 23,199 males, 24,336 females, and 147 people of other genders in 16,233 dwellings. 2.3% of people identified as LGBTIQ+. The median age was 34.4 years (compared with 38.1 years nationally). There were 10,647 people (22.3%) aged under 15 years, 9,816 (20.6%) aged 15 to 29, 20,082 (42.1%) aged 30 to 64, and 7,134 (15.0%) aged 65 or older.

People could identify as more than one ethnicity. The results were 58.2% European (Pākehā); 35.9% Māori; 12.8% Pasifika; 11.0% Asian; 0.8% Middle Eastern, Latin American and African New Zealanders (MELAA); and 1.8% other, which includes people giving their ethnicity as "New Zealander". English was spoken by 94.8%, Māori by 9.3%, Samoan by 4.2%, and other languages by 10.8%. No language could be spoken by 2.4% (e.g. too young to talk). New Zealand Sign Language was known by 0.6%. The percentage of people born overseas was 19.7, compared with 28.8% nationally.

Religious affiliations were 36.6% Christian, 1.7% Hindu, 0.7% Islam, 4.0% Māori religious beliefs, 0.7% Buddhist, 0.4% New Age, 0.1% Jewish, and 3.2% other religions. People who answered that they had no religion were 46.9%, and 6.1% of people did not answer the census question.

Of those at least 15 years old, 5,646 (15.2%) people had a bachelor's or higher degree, 19,941 (53.8%) had a post-high school certificate or diploma, and 11,451 (30.9%) people exclusively held high school qualifications. The median income was $38,800, compared with $41,500 nationally. 1,914 people (5.2%) earned over $100,000 compared to 12.1% nationally. The employment status of those at least 15 was 19,239 (51.9%) full-time, 4,344 (11.7%) part-time, and 1,221 (3.3%) unemployed.

Individual SA3 statistical areas
Name	Area (km^{2})	Population	Density (per km^{2})	Dwellings	Median age	Median income
Flaxmere	7.18	11,745	1,636	3,078	28.8 years	$37,400
Frimley	2.48	3,648	1,471	1,284	40.5 years	$41,800
Mahora	2.03	6,030	2,970	2,232	37.8 years	$39,300
Camberley	0.93	2,403	2,584	687	30.1 years	$32,300
St Leonards	1.03	2,610	2,534	1,044	36.1 years	$41,600
Hastings Central-Parkvale	3.31	4,704	1,421	1,989	40.4 years	$37,500
Raureka	2.12	5,256	2,479	1,818	34.9 years	$39,700
Ākina	2.05	5,244	2,558	2,031	35.2 years	$41,100
Mayfair-Tomoana	5.16	6,045	1,172	2,070	34.5 years	$39,900
New Zealand					38.1 years	$41,500

=== Redevelopment ===
Architecturally speaking, Hastings suffered similarly to Napier in the 1931 Hawke's Bay earthquake. However, because of the lesser damage by fire, Hastings maintained more pre earthquake buildings. Both towns gained a legacy from the disaster by rebuilding in the then-fashionable and highly distinctive Art Deco style, similar to that of Miami, Florida, USA. Hastings also possesses a large amount of Spanish Mission architecture (popular as with Art Deco in the early 1930s). However, Hastings succumbed to rapid redevelopment in the 1960s and 70s, which saw many 1930s buildings replaced.

By the end of the twentieth century, Hastings, along with most of New Zealand, was suffering from the recent economic downturn with industries and freezing works closing due to the agricultural subsidy reforms in the early 1980s. However, after multimillion-dollar regeneration projects and the employment of artists, Hastings has seen a change in its aesthetics. A CBD strategy was enforced to revitalise the central retail core, while promoting Havelock North as a 'luxury boutique' destination. The strategy proved extremely successful, and Hastings vacancy rates hit an all-time low in 2005. The current goal of the council is to continue developing Hastings CBD to attract additional national chains, while attracting more cafes and entertainment venues is currently active in the eastern blocks of Heretaunga St.

The Hastings District Council has recently relocated and consequently rebuilt the Hastings Sports Park at a new facility on the edge of the Hastings urban area to make way for a large megacentre, also known as "large format stores". A comprehensive study was conducted before the sale, concluding that retaining big box development within the CBD will help boutique stores prosper as opposed to locating the development on a greenfield site. Charter Hall, the developers behind 'The Park' megacentre, had confirmed as of August 2010, the major anchors of the development will be the relocation of Hawkes Bay's largest 'The Warehouse' and the relocation of the cities' Mitre 10 Mega. The new sports park is proposed as a regional facility and includes a velodrome, all-weather athletics track and sports grounds for most other sporting codes represented in NZ sport. Since its completion, the Hastings sports park now hosts multiple tennis courts, netball courts and an internationally recognised hockey turf.

== Horse of the Year show ==
Hawkes Bay A&P Showgrounds in Hastings is the home to the annual NZ Horse of the Year show, held in March. It is one of the biggest sporting events in the Southern Hemisphere, and attracts 2500 horse and rider combinations competing in 19 disciplines including Dressage, Showhunter, Eventing, Showjumping, polocrosse and many breed classes. It has a budget of around NZ$3 million, and attracts over 70,000 visitors from over NZ and internationally over the five-day show.

== Suburbs ==
Labelled map of Statistical Area 2 divisions surrounding Hastings with Urban/Rural settlements shown

City suburbs:

- Hastings Ward: Akina, Camberley, Frimley, Hastings Central, Mahora, Mayfair, Parkvale, Raureka, St Leonards, Stortford Lodge, Tomoana, Waipatu, Whakatu
- Havelock North Ward: Havelock North Central, Anderson Park, Iona, Te Mata, Te Mata Hills,
- Flaxmere Ward: Flaxmere East, Kingsley-Chatham, Lochain, Woolwich

Outlying communities: Bridge Pa, Karamu, Longlands, Mangateretere, Maraekakaho, Omahu/Fernhill, Pakipaki, Pukahu, Twyford.

== Transport ==
=== Road ===
State Highway 2 connects Hastings with Napier, Wairoa and Gisborne to the north and (via Dannevirke) Wellington, Masterton and Palmerston North to the south. SH 2 used to run through Hastings, but due to the city's road layout, there was a gap where SH 2's northern and southern sections did not meet up. SH 2 now connects Hastings to Napier along Hawke's Bay Expressway, which provides a more direct link between the two cities and to Hawke's Bay Airport and Napier Port for heavy-vehicle traffic from Hastings. The former designation of SH 2 is now State Highway 51. SH 51 enters and exits Hastings in a north-east direction. Heading north-east, it passes through residential Hastings, then follows the Clive River through the towns of Whakatu and Clive, bridges across the Clive, Tutaekuri and Ngaruroro Rivers before following the coast into Napier.

State Highway 50 begins at a junction just north of Takapau, and connects Hastings and Hawke's Bay to the Ruataniwha Valley and western Hawke's Bay. It provides an alternative, quieter and (in terms of distance) shorter route into Hawke's Bay. It also connects Hastings to many of Hawke's Bay's wineries, for which the region is known internationally. It makes up part of the Hawke's Bay Wine Trail.

Go Bus operates nine Go Bay routes in Hastings, with funding from Hawke's Bay Regional Council. Bee Cards replaced goBay cards on 24 August 2020.

=== Rail ===
The Palmerston North–Gisborne Line (PNGL) is a secondary main line railway that runs through the centre of Hastings (a planned feature unique to the city) and joins the North Island Main Trunk railway near Palmerston North. The railway divides Hastings from southwest to northeast and cuts off many of the main streets in the centre of the city, many being labelled as east or west depending on what side of the railway they originate from. Passenger services ran to Hastings until 2001. The Hastings railway station is now a major centre for freight services along the PNGL and provides Napier Port with many of its freight exports.

== Infrastructure and services ==
=== Utilities ===
The Hastings Borough Council established the city's first public electricity supply in 1912, with electricity generated by two diesel engines in Eastbourne Street. Originally, electricity was supplied using a 230/460-volt three-wire DC system, converting to the now-standard 230/400-volt three-phase AC system in the 1920s. Hastings was connected to the Mangahao hydroelectric scheme in 1927, and the Waikaremoana hydroelectric scheme in 1929. The Hawke's Bay Electric Power Board took over from the borough council in 1935.

The 1998 electricity sector reforms saw the electric power board (then named Hawke's Bay Power) sell its retail base to Contact Energy, with the remaining lines business renamed Hawke's Bay Networks and later Unison Networks. Today, Unison Networks continues to own and operate the local electricity distribution network servicing the city, with electricity fed into it primarily from the Transpower substations at Fernhill and Whakatu.

Natural gas arrived in Napier and Hastings in 1983, with the completion of the high-pressure pipeline from Palmerston North to Hastings. The high-pressure transmission pipelines supplying the city are now owned and operated by First Gas, with Powerco owning and operating the local natural gas distribution network. In February 2004, the city and wider Hawke's Bay Region lost natural gas supply for six days after a flood washed away a bridge near Ashhurst supporting the high-pressure pipeline to the region.

== Parks ==
Hastings has numerous parks and reserves.

List of parks and reserves (Note: Several non-notable reserves have been omitted.)
Park	Suburb	Photo	Area (hectares)	Opened
Akina Park	Akina		9.44	
Bill Mathewson Park	Mayfair		3.60	
Civic Square	Hastings Central		2.01	
Cornwall Park	Mahora		8.34	November 1905
Duke Street Reserve	Mahora		1.23	
Ebbett Park	Raureka		3.36	
Frimley Park	Frimley		19.78	October 1953
Hastings Cemetery	Camberley		6.67	
Hawke's Bay Regional Sports Park	Frimley		30.18	After 2007
Kirkpatrick Park	Camberley		3.63	
Landmarks Square	Hastings Central		0.09	
St Aubyn Street Reserve	St Leonards		1.30	
St Leonards Park	St Leonards		4.87	
Queens Square	Parkvale		1.01	
Tamatea Street Reserve	Mahora		0.79	
William Nelson Park	Hastings Central		0.60	
Windsor Park	Mayfair/Parkvale		26.80	1885 (Note: Park was created in 1885, renamed Windsor Park in 1935)

== Notable people ==
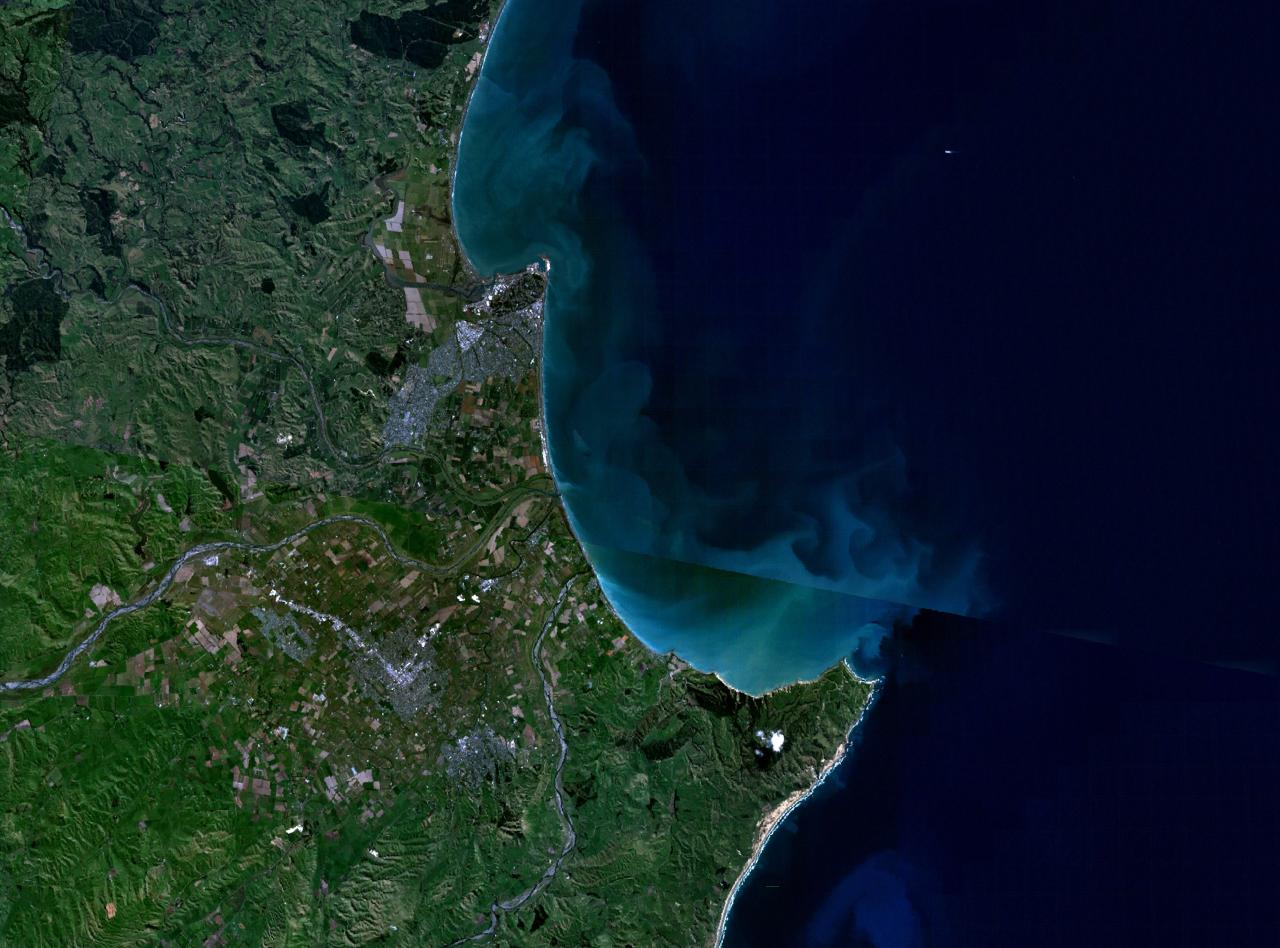
NASA satellite photo of southern Hawke Bay, including Hastings and Napier

Notable residents of the Hastings metro area have included:

- Rita Angus - artist
- Donna Awatere Huata – former politician
- Geordie Beamish – 2024 World Indoor Athletics Championships, 1500 metres champion
- Joh Bjelke-Petersen – Premier of Queensland, Australia
- Martin Campbell – TV and film director
- Alan Duff – author (Once Were Warriors) and co-founder of Duffy Books in Homes
- Georgina Evers-Swindell – Olympic rowing gold medalist
- Caroline Evers-Swindell – Olympic rowing gold medalist
- Robert Felkin – medical missionary, explorer and ceremonial magician
- Paul Holmes – radio and television broadcaster
- Phil Judd – musician, composer and founding member of Split Enz
- Cobber Kain – first Allied fighter ace of WW2, 14 kills in the Battle of France
- Josh Kronfeld – All Black rugby player who attended Hastings Boys High
- Liam Lawson - Formula One racing driver
- John Marwick – palaeontologist and geologist.
- Ross McEwan - Former CEO of Royal Bank of Scotland, now CEO of the National Australia Bank
- John McIntyre - racing driver
- Alfred Meebold – botanist, writer, and anthroposopher
- Greg Murphy – V8 Supercar racer
- George Nēpia – All Black who attended Maori Agricultural College
- Mark Paston – New Zealand representative football goalkeeper
- Abe Phillips - lead singer of Hastings band, The Shadracks
- Bruce Robertson – All Black rugby player who attended Hastings Boys High
- Taine Randell – rugby player who captained the All Blacks and attended Lindisfarne College in Hastings
- Jason Reeves – radio and television host who attended Karamu High School in Hastings
- Ian Smith – New Zealand representative cricketer
- John Timu – rugby player who represented New Zealand in rugby union and rugby league, and attended Lindisfarne College in Hastings
- Kirsten Warner – novelist, poet and journalist
- James Wattie – industrialist/entrepreneur and founder of Wattie's
- Joan Wiffen – amateur palaeontologist who discovered the first dinosaur fossils in New Zealand
- Chrissy Witoko – owner of the Evergreen Coffee Lounge, meeting place for Wellington's LGBTQIA+ community
- Eric Young – Prime TV news presenter

== Sources ==
- Moss, Maryan. 1999. Historic Outline of the Hastings District.
- Boyd, Mary Beatrice (1984). City of the Plains – A History of Hastings. Victoria University Press for the Hastings City Council.
