= Mahora, New Zealand =

Suburb of Hastings, New Zealand

Mahora
- Suburb
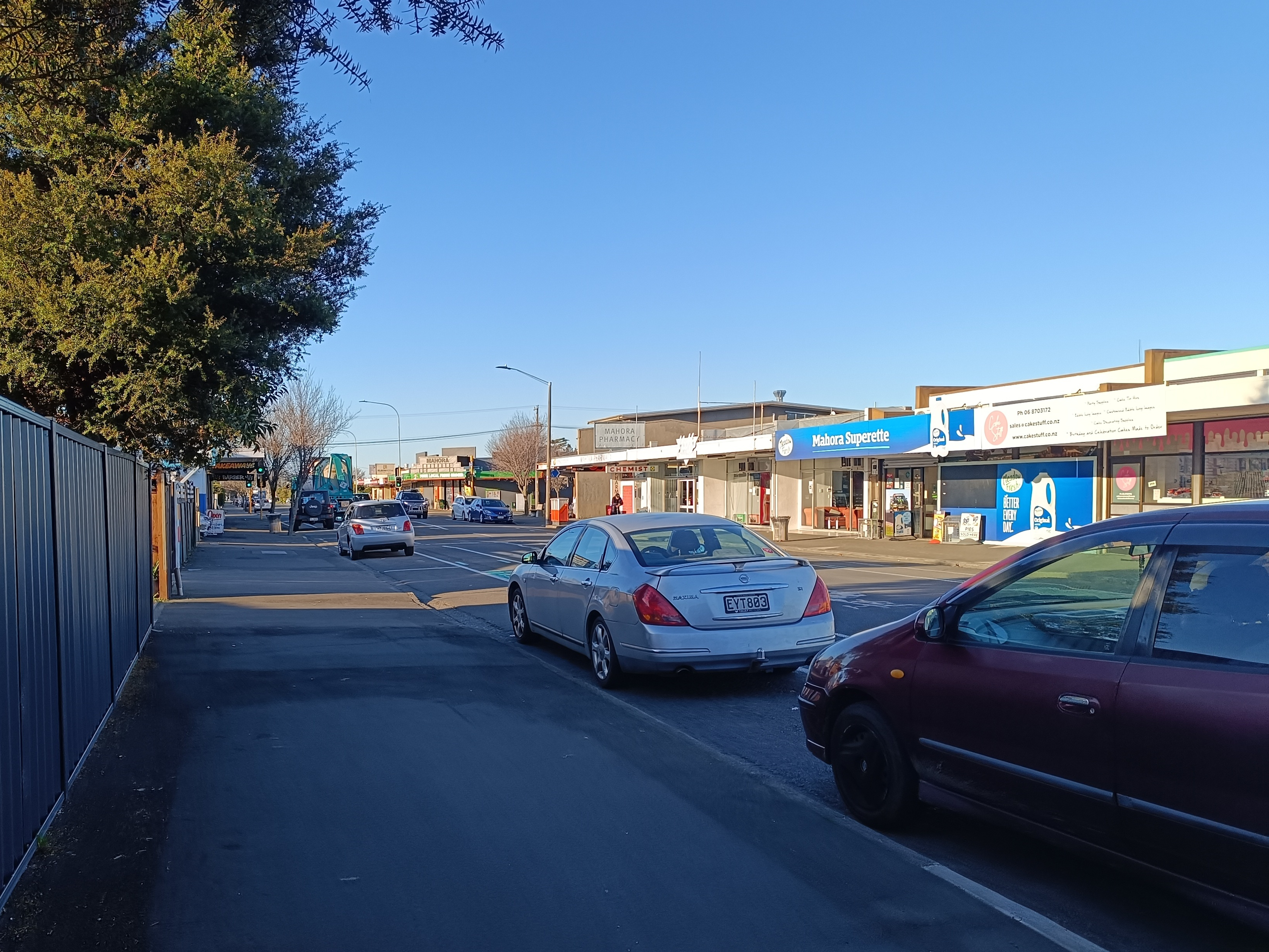
- Mahora shops, July 2024
- Interactive map of Mahora
- Coordinates: 39.628328°S 176.850302°E
- Country: New Zealand
- City: Hastings
- Local authority: Hastings District Council
- Electoral ward: Hastings-Havelock North General Ward; Takitimu Māori Ward

Area
  - Land: 203 ha (500 acres)

Population (June 2025)
  - Total: 6,230
  - Density: 3,070/km^{2} (7,950/sq mi)

Frimley		Tomoana
Camberley	Mahora	Waipatu
St Leonards	Hastings Central	Mayfair

Mahora is a suburb of the city of Hastings, in the Hawke's Bay region of New Zealand's eastern North Island.

== Demographics ==
Mahora covers 2.03 km^{2} (0.78 sq mi) and had an estimated population of 6,230 as of June 2025, with a population density of 3,069 people per km^{2}.

Historical population
Year	Pop.	±% p.a.
2006	4,719	—
2013	4,965	+0.73%
2018	5,604	+2.45%
2023	6,030	+1.48%

Mahora had a population of 6,030 in the 2023 New Zealand census, an increase of 426 people (7.6%) since the 2018 census, and an increase of 1,065 people (21.5%) since the 2013 census. There were 2,883 males, 3,132 females, and 18 people of other genders in 2,235 dwellings. 2.4% of people identified as LGBTIQ+. There were 1,221 people (20.2%) aged under 15 years, 1,122 (18.6%) aged 15 to 29, 2,562 (42.5%) aged 30 to 64, and 1,122 (18.6%) aged 65 or older.

People could identify as more than one ethnicity. The results were 67.2% European (Pākehā); 27.1% Māori; 8.0% Pasifika; 12.1% Asian; 0.7% Middle Eastern, Latin American and African New Zealanders (MELAA); and 2.5% other, which includes people giving their ethnicity as "New Zealander". English was spoken by 94.9%, Māori by 6.0%, Samoan by 2.4%, and other languages by 10.8%. No language could be spoken by 2.3% (e.g. too young to talk). New Zealand Sign Language was known by 0.6%. The percentage of people born overseas was 20.1, compared with 28.8% nationally.

Religious affiliations were 36.6% Christian, 1.9% Hindu, 0.7% Islam, 2.0% Māori religious beliefs, 0.7% Buddhist, 0.4% New Age, and 4.0% other religions. People who answered that they had no religion were 47.8%, and 6.0% of people did not answer the census question.

Of those at least 15 years old, 897 (18.7%) people had a bachelor's or higher degree, 2,571 (53.5%) had a post-high school certificate or diploma, and 1,338 (27.8%) people exclusively held high school qualifications. 324 people (6.7%) earned over $100,000 compared to 12.1% nationally. The employment status of those at least 15 was 2,421 (50.3%) full-time, 621 (12.9%) part-time, and 114 (2.4%) unemployed.

Individual statistical areas
Name	Area (km^{2})	Population	Density (per km^{2})	Dwellings	Median age	Median income
Mahora	0.95	2,907	3,060	1,005	35.9 years	$41,400
Cornwall Park	1.08	3,123	2,892	1,230	39.7 years	$37,600
New Zealand					38.1 years	$41,500

== Education ==
Mahora School is a co-educational state primary school, with a roll of 355 as of July 2025. It opened in 1903.

St Mary's School is a co-educational Catholic primary school, with a roll of 280 as of July 2025. It opened in 1957.
