= List of marae in Hawke's Bay =

This is a list of marae (Māori meeting grounds) in the Hawke's Bay region of New Zealand.

In October 2020, the Government committed $9,623,529 from the Provincial Growth Fund to upgrade 51 marae in the region, with the intention of creating 262.5 jobs.

== Wairoa District ==
Marae name	Wharenui name	Iwi and hapū	Location
Aranui Marae	Arapera / Te Poho o Ngapera	Ngāti Kahungunu (Ngāi Tamaterangi, Ngāti Peehi)	Frasertown
Arimawha Marae	Arimawha	Ngāti Kahungunu (Ngāti Tamaterangi)	Frasertown
Erepēti	Pourangahua	Ngāti Kahungunu (Ngāti Hingānga / Te Aitanga o Pourangahua)	Te Reinga
Hinemihi Marae	Te Poho o Hinemihi	Ngāti Kahungunu (Ngāti Hinemihi)	Wairoa
Hurumua	Hurumua Memorial Hall	Ngāti Kahungunu (Ngāi Tānemitirangi)	Wairoa
Iwitea	Te Poho o Tahu	Ngāti Kahungunu (Mātawhaiti)	Wairoa
Te Kūhā Tārewa Marae	Te Poho o Hinekura or Ruapani	Tūhoe (Ngāti Hinekura), Ngāti Ruapani (Ngãti Hinekura, Tuwai)	Tuai
Kahungunu Marae	Te Maara A Ngata	Ngāti Kahungunu (Ngāti Pāhauwera), Ngāti Pāhauwera	Nūhaka
Kahungunu-Te Tāhinga Marae	Kahungunu Wharenui	Ngāti Kahungunu (Rakaipaaka)	Nūhaka
Kaiuku / Oku-ra-renga	Kiwi	Ngāti Kahungunu (Ngāi Tū, Ngāti Tama, Rongomaiwahine)	Māhia
Kihitu	Te Rauhina	Ngāti Kahungunu (Ngāti Kahu)	Wairoa
Kurahikakawa Marae	No wharenui	Ngāti Kahungunu (Ngāti Pāhauwera), Ngāti Pāhauwera	Raupunga
Māhanga / Rongomaiwahine	Te Poho o Rongomaiwahine	Ngāti Kahungunu (Ngāi Tū, Rongomaiwahine)	Nūhaka
Pākōwhai	Te Huinga o Te Aroha	Ngāti Kahungunu (Ngāti Mihi)	Frasertown
Pūtahi	Te Poho o Hinepehinga	Ngāti Kahungunu (Ngāti Hinepehinga)	Frasertown
Putere	Pareroa Wharenui	Tūhoe, Ngāti Ruapani (Ngāti Hinekura, Pukehore, Tuwai), Ngāti Kahungunu (Ngāti Pāhauwera, Ruapani), Ngāti Pāhauwera	Raupunga
Rangiāhua	Te Poho o Tamaterangi	Ngāti Kahungunu (Ngāi Tamaterangi)	Raupunga
Raupunga Marae	Te Huki	Ngāti Kahungunu (Ngāti Pāhauwera), Ngāti Pāhauwera	Raupunga
Ruataniwha	Te Poho o Riria	Ngāti Kahungunu (Ngāi Te Kapuamātotoru)	Wairoa
Ruawharo	Ruawharo	Ngāti Kahungunu (Ngāti Tama, Rongomaiwahine)	Ōpoutama
Taihoa	Te Otane	Ngāti Kahungunu (Ngāti Kurupakiaka / Te Kāwiti)	Wairoa
Tākitimu-Waihirere	Tākitimu Wharenui	Ngāti Kahungunu (Ngāi Te Apatu, Ngāti Moewhare)	Wairoa
Tamakahu	Tamakahu	Ngāti Kahungunu (Rakaipaaka)	Nūhaka
Tāne-nui-a-Rangi	Tāne-nui-a-Rangi	Ngāti Kahungunu (Rakaipaaka)	Nūhaka
Tawhiti A Maru	St Therese’s Church	Catholic Church	Wairoa
Te Kotahitanga Marae	Nūhaka Unity Hall	Ngāti Kahungunu (Rakaipaaka)	Nūhaka
Te Manutai	Te Manutai	Ngāti Kahungunu (Rakaipaaka)	Nūhaka
Te Mira / Whetū Mārama / Mill Pā	Mākoro	Ngāti Kahungunu (Ngāti Mākoro)	Wairoa
Te Poho o Te Rehu / Te Rehu	Te Poho o Te Rehu	Ngāti Kahungunu (Rakaipaaka)	Nūhaka
Te Rākatō	Te Rākatō	Ngāti Kahungunu (Ngāi Rākatō)	Māhia
Te Reinga Marae	Tuarenga	Ngāti Kahungunu (Ngāti Hinehika, Ngāti Kōhatu)	Te Reinga
Tuahuru	Hine te Rongo	Ngāti Kahungunu (Ngāti Tama, Ngāi Tū, Rongomaiwahine)	Māhia
Waiapapa-a-Iwi Mohaka	Te Kahu-o-te-rangi	Ngāti Kahungunu (Kurahikakawa, Ngāti Pāhauwera), Ngāti Pāhauwera	Mōhaka
Waimako Marae	Te Poho o Tuhoe Potiki	Tūhoe (Te Whānau Pani), Ngāti Ruapani (Pukehore, Tuwai)	Tuai
Waihua / Kurahikakawa	Waihua	Ngāti Kahungunu (Ngāti Kurahikakawa), Ngāti Pāhauwera	Mōhaka
Whaakirangi	Whaakirangi	Ngāti Kahungunu (Ngāti Mātangirau)	Wairoa
Whakakī	Whakakī	Ngāti Kahungunu (Ngāti Hine, Ngāti Hinepua, Ngāi Te Ipu)	Whakaki

== Hastings District ==
Marae name	Wharenui name	Iwi and hapū	Location
Te Āwhina Marae	Demolished	Ngāti Kahungunu (Te Ūpokoiri, Ngāti Hinemanu, Ngāti Mahuika)	Fernhill
Hamuera / Moteo	Rangimarie	Ngāti Kahungunu (Ngāti Hinepare, Ngāti Māhu)	Puketapu
Te Hāroto Marae	Te Rongopai	Ngāti Tūwharetoa (Ngāti Hineuru)	Te Hāroto
Houngarea Marae	Houngarea	Ngāti Kahungunu (Ngāti Ngarengare, Ngāti Papatuamāro, Ngāti Tamaterā, Ngāti Te Rehunga)	Pakipaki
Kahurānaki Marae	Kahurānaki	Ngāti Kahungunu (Ngāi Te Rangikoianake, Ngāti Te Whatuiāpiti)	Poukawa
Kohupātiki	Tanenuiarangi	Ngāti Kahungunu (Ngati Hōri, Ngāti Toaharapaki)	Clive
Korongatā	Nukanoa	Ngāti Kahungunu (Ngāti Pōporo, Ngāti Te Whatuiāpiti)	Bridge Pa
Mangaroa Marae	Hikawera II	Ngāti Kahungunu (Ngāti Pōporo, Ngāti Rahunga)	Bridge Pa
Matahiwi Marae	Te Matau a Māui	Ngāti Kahungunu (Ngāti Hāwea, Ngāti Kautere)	Clive
Mihiroa Marae	Mihiroa	Ngāti Kahungunu (Ngāti Mihiroa)	Pakipaki
Omāhu	Kahukuranui	Ngāti Kahungunu (Ngāi Te Ūpokoiri, Ngāti Hinemanu	Omahu
Pētane Marae	Te Amiki	Ngāti Kahungunu (Ngāti Matepū, Ngāti Whakaari)	Whirinaki
Ruahāpia	Karaitiana Takamoana	Ngāti Kahungunu (Ngāti Hāwea, Ngati Hōri)	Waipatu
Rūnanga Marae	Te Aroha	Ngāti Kahungunu (Ngāi Te Ūpokoiri, Ngāti Hinemanu, Ngāti Mahuika)	Puketapu
Tangoio Marae	Pūnanga Te Wao	Ngāti Kahungunu (Maungaharuru Tangitū – Marangatūhetaua, Ngāi Tauira, Ngāi Te Ruruku ki Tangoio, Ngāi Tahu, Ngāti Kurumōkihi, Ngāti Whakaari)	Tangoio
Taraia Marae	Taraia	Ngāti Kahungunu (Ngāti Hōtoa, Ngāti Taraia)	Pakipaki
Timikara	Te Whānau Pani	Ngāti Kahungunu (Ngāti Hinepare, Ngāti Māhu)	Puketapu
Waimārama Marae	Taupunga	Ngāti Kahungunu (Ngāti Hikatoa, Ngāti Kurukuru, Ngāti Urakiterangi, Ngāti Whakaiti)	Waimārama
Waiohiki Marae	Waiohiki	Ngāti Kahungunu (Ngāti Pārau)	Waiohiki
Waipatu Marae	Heretaunga	Ngāti Kahungunu (Ngāti Hāwea, Ngāti Hinemoa, Ngāti Hōri)	Waipatu
Wharerangi	Manahau	Ngāti Kahungunu (Tāwhao, Ngāti Hinepare)	Puketapu

== Napier City ==
Marae name	Wharenui name	Iwi and hapū	Location
Pukemokimoki	Omio	Ngāti Kahungunu (Ngā Hau E Whā)	Onekawa

== Central Hawke's Bay District ==
Marae name	Wharenui name	Iwi and hapū	Location
Mataweka	Nohomaiterangi	Ngāti Kahungunu (Ngāi Toroiwaho, Ngāti Te Whatuiāpiti)	Waipawa
Pourerere	No wharenui	Ngāti Kahungunu (Ngāi Te Ōatua, Ngāti Tamaterā)	Blackhead
Pukehou Marae	Keke Haunga	Ngāti Kahungunu (Ngāti Kekehaunga, Ngāti Pukututu, Ngāti Te Whatuiāpiti)	Pukehou
Rakautātahi	Te Poho o Te Whatuiapiti	Ngāti Kahungunu (Ngāi Toroiwaho, Ngāi Te Kikiri o Te Rangi, Ngāi Toroiwaho, Rangi Te Kahutia, Rangitotohu), Rangitāne (Ngāi Tahu, Ngāti Rangitotohu)	Tikokino
Rongomaraeroa	Te Poho o Kahungunu	Ngāti Kahungunu (Ngāti Hinetewai, Ngāti Kere, Ngāti Manuhiri, Ngāti Pihere, Tamatea Hinepare o Kahungunu)	Porangahau
Rongo o Tahu	No wharenui	Ngāti Kahungunu (Ngāi Toroiwaho)	Takapau
Tapairu Marae	Te Rangitahi / Te Whaea o te Katoa	Ngāti Kahungunu (Ngāti Mārau o Kahungunu)	Waipawa
Waipukurau Marae	No wharenui	Ngāti Kahungunu (Ngāti Parakiore, Ngāti Te Whatuiāpiti, Ngāti Tamatea)	Waipukurau
Te Whatuiāpiti Marae	Te Whatuiāpiti	Ngāti Kahungunu (Ngāti Te Whatuiāpiti)	Pātangata

== See also ==
- Lists of marae in New Zealand
- List of schools in the Hawke's Bay region
