= Napier-Hastings Urban Area =

- Urban area
- Hastings/Napier
- Coordinates: 39°35′0″S 176°51′0″E
- Country: New Zealand
- Region: Hawke's Bay

Area
  - Territorial: 5,335 km^{2} (2,060 sq mi)
- Elevation: 9 m (30 ft)

Population (June 2018)
  - Territorial: 139,600
  - Density: 26.17/km^{2} (67.77/sq mi)
  - Urban: 134,500
- Postcodes: 4120, 4122

The Napier-Hastings Urban Area was defined by Statistics New Zealand (Stats NZ) as a main urban area of New Zealand that was based around the twin cities of Napier and Hastings in the Hawke's Bay Region. It was defined under the New Zealand Standard Areas Classification 1992 (NZSAC92), which has since been superseded by the Statistical Standard for Geographic Areas 2018 (SSGA18).

The urban area lay mostly on the Heretaunga Plains, with part on surrounding hills. It was a city cluster consisting of the cities of Napier and Hastings, the town of Havelock North and some smaller settlements. It was the sixth-most-populous urban area in the country under the NZSAC92, with 134,500 residents, fewer than Tauranga (141,600) and more than Dunedin (122,000).

While the two cities are separated by 9 km (5.6 mi) of rural land from city edge to edge (20 km from one city centre to the next), there is sufficient economic and social integration between the cities that Stats NZ treated them as a single urban area. The daily traffic flows across all bridges crossing the Tutaekuri River between Napier and Hastings was 54,500 VPD prior to the 2023 Cyclone Gabrielle. Stats NZ also subdivided the urban area into urban zones, as they did for the urban areas of Auckland, Hamilton and Wellington. The Napier-Hastings Urban Area contains about three-quarters of the population of the entire Hawke's Bay.

Under SSGA18, Stats NZ split up the Napier-Hastings Urban Area for statistical purposes. It was split into two "large urban areas" (30,000 to 99,999 population) of Napier and Hastings, the "medium urban area" (10,000 to 29,999) of Havelock North, the "small urban area" (1,000 to 9,999) of Clive, and the "rural settlements" (300 to 999) of Haumoana, Te Awanga, Whakatu and Whirinaki. Some settlements of less than 300 that were included in the Napier-Hastings Urban Area were left out entirely, including Eskdale, Omahu, Pakipaki, Pakowhai and Waiohiki. Stats NZ similarly split Wellington into Lower Hutt, Porirua, Upper Hutt and the urban part of Wellington City under SSGA18.

Population density map of Hawke's Bay Region as of 2018, with the residential areas of Napier-Hastings Urban Area in red

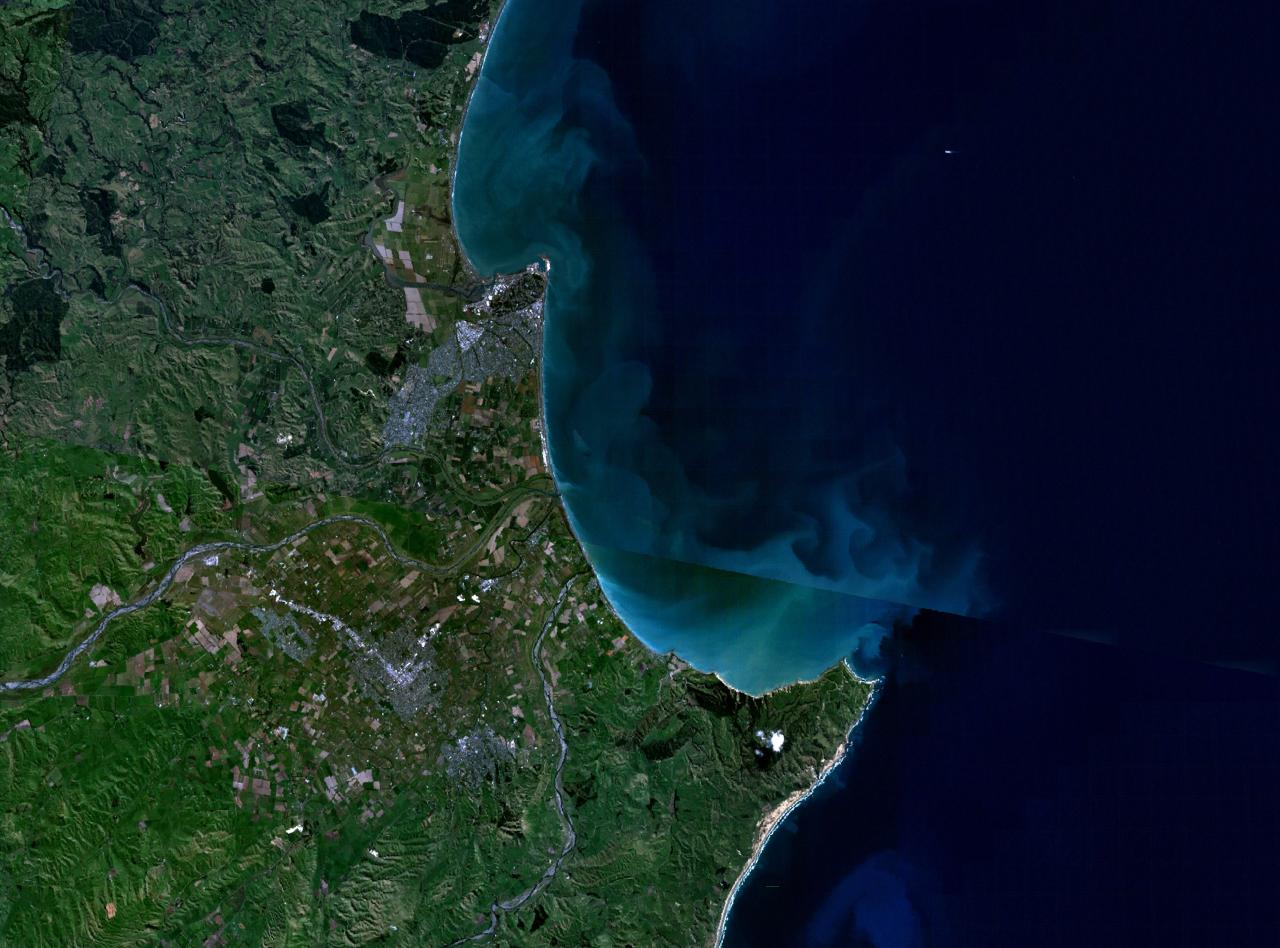
Composite satellite photo of the urban area and surrounding areas

== Urban zones ==
=== Hastings Urban Zone ===
Hastings Urban Zone lay within Hastings District and included Hastings, Havelock North and localities from Omahu and Pakowhai in the north, Pakipaki in the west, to settlements near the coast from Clive to Te Awanga. The main urban zone of Hastings contained around 68,000 people. Hastings hosts the regional hospital, showgrounds, racecourse, newspaper print, sports park and a water park.

Hastings on its own would have been the 8th largest urban area in New Zealand.

=== Napier Urban Zone ===
Napier Urban Zone consisted of Napier city and two parts of Hastings District that adjoin it: the Eskdale–Whirinaki area to the north and the Waiohiki area to the south. Napier hosts the region's port (the majority of export coming from Hastings' industry and food processing), airport, High Court and polytechnic college, and the regional council headquarters.

Napier on its own would have been the 10th largest urban area in New Zealand.

== Amalgamation ==
Amalgamation is an ongoing debate for Napier and Hastings residents. Both cities have previously had smaller amalgamations (Napier absorbed Taradale in 1968, and Hastings absorbed Havelock North in the local government reforms of 1989).

A referendum in 1999 on amalgamating Hastings and Napier received in 75% 'no' vote from Napier residents, and a 64% 'yes' vote from Hastings residents. Many say the referendum was called too early and many Napier residents were still bitter about the closing of Napier Hospital in 1998 and making Hastings Hospital the only public hospital in the region.

A proposal in 2015 was for the new council to also absorb the Wairoa and Central Hawkes Bay councils to make a super regional council of 150,000 people. In a referendum held in September 2015, the majority of voters (~66%) rejected the proposal in favour of the status quo.

== Seismicity ==
Hawke's Bay is one of the most seismically active regions in New Zealand, and Napier-Hastings has experienced many large earthquakes. More than 50 damaging earthquakes have rocked the area since the European colonisation in the 1800s. Some of the more notable are listed below.

| Date | Location | Magnitude (ML) | Depth | Fatalities | More information |
|---|---|---|---|---|---|
| 8 July 1843 | 25 km west of Tikokino | 7.6 | 12 km | 2 | |
| 22 February 1863 | Waipukurau | 7.5 | 25 km | | 1863 Hawke's Bay earthquake |
| 5 October 1911 | Hastings | 5.6 | 33 km | | |
| 28 June 1921 | Kaweka Forest Park | 7.0 | 80 km | | |
| 3 February 1931 | 20 km north of Napier | 7.8 | 20 km | 256 killed, thousands injured | 1931 Hawke's Bay earthquake |
| 8 February 1931 | Wairoa | 6.4 | 60 km | | |
| 13 February 1931 | 50 km east of Napier | 7.3 | 30 km | | |
| 16 September 1932 | Wairoa | 6.9 | 12 km | | |
| 15 March 1934 | Mohaka | 6.1 | 25 km | | |
| 26 February 1940 | Hastings | 6.0 | 25 km | | |
| 31 January 1958 | Waipawa | 6.1 | 12 km | | |
| 5 October 1980 | Hastings | 5.7 | 30 km | | |
| 11 April 1993 | Hastings | 6.1 | 38 km | | |
| 15 October 2001 | Hastings | 5.8 | 40 km | | |
| 25 August 2008 | Hastings | 5.9 | 31 km | | |

== Education ==
The Eastern Institute of Technology is based at Taradale and is the main regional tertiary education centre for the Hawke's Bay and Gisborne regions, with campuses at Taradale, Auckland and Gisborne.

Secondary schools
| Name | Gender | Area | Decile | Roll | Website | MOE |
|---|---|---|---|---|---|---|
| Flaxmere College | Coed | Flaxmere | 1 | 364 | | 134 |
| Hastings Boys' High School | Boys | Hastings | 2 | 755 | | 227 |
| Hastings Christian School | Coed | Hastings | 7 | 328 | | 443 |
| Hastings Girls' High School | Girls | Hastings | 2 | 525 | | 228 |
| Havelock North High School | Coed | Havelock North | 8 | 1,153 | | |
| Hohepa Home School | Coed | Taradale | 8 | 28 | – | 4109 |
| Iona College | Girls | Havelock North | 9 | 339 | | 224 |
| Karamu High School | Coed | Hastings | 4 | 900 | | 229 |
| Lindisfarne College | Boys | Hastings | 10 | 564 | | 230 |
| Napier Boys' High School | Boys | Napier | 6 | 1,296 | | 216 |
| Napier Girls' High School | Girls | Napier | 7 | 1,028 | | 217 |
| Sacred Heart College | Girls | Napier | 5 | 354 | | 219 |
| St John's College | Boys | Hastings | 4 | 406 | | 226 |
| St Joseph's Māori Girls' College | Girls | Taradale | 3 | 180 | | 222 |
| Taikura Rudolf Steiner School | Coed | Hastings | 6 | 281 | | 231 |
| Tamatea High School | Coed | Napier | 3 | 346 | | 218 |
| Taradale High School | Coed | Taradale | 8 | 1,049 | | 215 |
| TKKM o Ngati Kahungunu Ki Heretaunga | Coed | Flaxmere | 1 | 241 | – | 2445 |
| TKKM o Te Ara Hou | Coed | Napier | 2 | 241 | – | 3107 |
| William Colenso College | Coed | Napier | 2 | 365 | | 220 |
| Woodford House | Girls | Havelock North | 9 | 381 | | 225 |
