= Tūtira =

Settlement in Hawke's Bay Region, New Zealand

- Settlement
- Interactive map of Tūtira
- Coordinates: 39.204°S 176.882°E
- Country: New Zealand
- Region: Hawke's Bay Region
- Territorial authority: Hastings District
- Ward: Mohaka General Ward; Takitimu Māori Ward
- Community: Hastings District Rural Community
- Subdivision: Tūtira subdivision
- Electorates: Napier; Ikaroa-Rāwhiti (Māori)

Government
  - Territorial Authority: Hastings District Council
  - Mayor of Hastings: Wendy Schollum
  - Napier MP: Katie Nimon
  - Ikaroa-Rāwhiti MP: Cushla Tangaere-Manuel

Area
  - Total: 401.51 km^{2} (155.02 sq mi)

Population (2023 Census)
  - Total: 333
  - Density: 0.829/km^{2} (2.15/sq mi)
- Postcode(s): 4184

Tūtira (also known as Tutira) is a village to the north of Napier and is part of the Hawke's Bay Region in New Zealand's North Island. It is located on State Highway 2 between Wairoa and Napier.

Much of the area was surveyed by Herbert Guthrie-Smith, who farmed 60,000 acres (240 km²) surrounding Lake Tūtira. Guthrie-Smith, a naturalist, published the popular Tutira: the story of a New Zealand sheep station in 1921. Today, a camp is run at the site of his homestead.

== Demographics ==
Tūtira and its surrounds cover 401.51 km^{2} (155.02 sq mi). It is part of the Puketitiri-Tutira statistical area.

Historical population for Tūtira and surrounds
Year	Pop.	±% p.a.
2006	486	—
2013	309	−6.26%
2018	336	+1.69%
2023	333	−0.18%
The 2006 population is for a larger area of 467.43 km^{2}. Source:

Tūtira had a population of 333 in the 2023 New Zealand census, a decrease of 3 people (−0.9%) since the 2018 census, and an increase of 24 people (7.8%) since the 2013 census. There were 174 males and 153 females in 126 dwellings. 0.9% of people identified as LGBTIQ+. There were 75 people (22.5%) aged under 15 years, 45 (13.5%) aged 15 to 29, 159 (47.7%) aged 30 to 64, and 54 (16.2%) aged 65 or older.

People could identify as more than one ethnicity. The results were 80.2% European (Pākehā); 39.6% Māori; 2.7% Pasifika; 0.9% Asian; 0.9% Middle Eastern, Latin American and African New Zealanders (MELAA); and 7.2% other, which includes people giving their ethnicity as "New Zealander". English was spoken by 97.3%, Māori by 2.7%, and other languages by 1.8%. No language could be spoken by 0.9% (e.g. too young to talk). New Zealand Sign Language was known by 0.9%. The percentage of people born overseas was 9.9, compared with 28.8% nationally.

Religious affiliations were 25.2% Christian, 1.8% Māori religious beliefs, and 0.9% Buddhist. People who answered that they had no religion were 61.3%, and 8.1% of people did not answer the census question.

Of those at least 15 years old, 27 (10.5%) people had a bachelor's or higher degree, 153 (59.3%) had a post-high school certificate or diploma, and 75 (29.1%) people exclusively held high school qualifications. 18 people (7.0%) earned over $100,000 compared to 12.1% nationally. The employment status of those at least 15 was 126 (48.8%) full-time, 39 (15.1%) part-time, and 6 (2.3%) unemployed.

=== Puketitiri-Tutira statistical area ===
Puketitiri-Tutira statistical area, which includes Dartmoor, New Zealand, Omahu, Patoka, Puketapu, Hawke's Bay, Tangoio, Te Haroto and Waipātiki Beach, covers 2,415.34 km^{2} (932.57 sq mi) and had an estimated population of 1,830 as of June 2025, with a population density of 0.76 people per km^{2}.

Historical population of Puketitiri-Tutira
Year	Pop.	±% p.a.
2006	1,743	—
2013	1,584	−1.36%
2018	1,722	+1.68%
2023	1,830	+1.22%
The 2006 population is for a larger area of 1,839 km^{2}. Source:

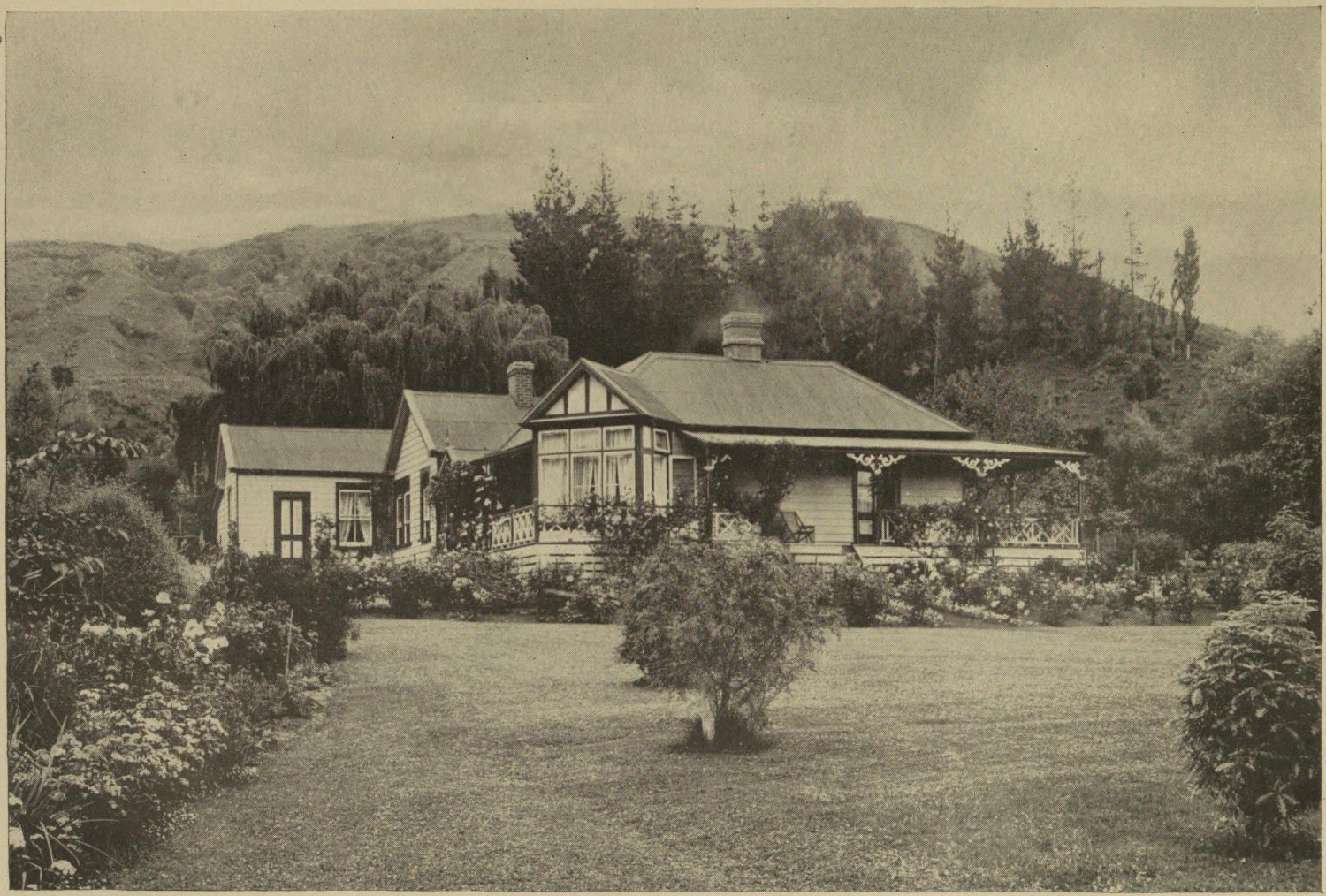
Tutira Homestead – home of Herbert Guthrie-Smith

Puketitiri-Tutira had a population of 1,830 in the 2023 New Zealand census, an increase of 108 people (6.3%) since the 2018 census, and an increase of 246 people (15.5%) since the 2013 census. There were 963 males, 858 females, and 6 people of other genders in 636 dwellings. 1.1% of people identified as LGBTIQ+. The median age was 39.7 years (compared with 38.1 years nationally). There were 402 people (22.0%) aged under 15 years, 276 (15.1%) aged 15 to 29, 891 (48.7%) aged 30 to 64, and 261 (14.3%) aged 65 or older.

People could identify as more than one ethnicity. The results were 84.4% European (Pākehā); 26.4% Māori; 3.0% Pasifika; 1.5% Asian; 0.2% Middle Eastern, Latin American and African New Zealanders (MELAA); and 5.2% other, which includes people giving their ethnicity as "New Zealander". English was spoken by 97.4%, Māori by 4.1%, Samoan by 0.5%, and other languages by 3.3%. No language could be spoken by 1.8% (e.g. too young to talk). New Zealand Sign Language was known by 0.5%. The percentage of people born overseas was 10.2, compared with 28.8% nationally.

Religious affiliations were 29.2% Christian, 3.8% Māori religious beliefs, 0.5% Buddhist, 0.5% New Age, 0.2% Jewish, and 0.8% other religions. People who answered that they had no religion were 59.3%, and 6.1% of people did not answer the census question.

Of those at least 15 years old, 207 (14.5%) people had a bachelor's or higher degree, 873 (61.1%) had a post-high school certificate or diploma, and 348 (24.4%) people exclusively held high school qualifications. The median income was $38,400, compared with $41,500 nationally. 111 people (7.8%) earned over $100,000 compared to 12.1% nationally. The employment status of those at least 15 was 747 (52.3%) full-time, 222 (15.5%) part-time, and 27 (1.9%) unemployed.

== Education ==
Tutira School is a co-educational state primary school, with a roll of 20 as of July 2026. It opened in 1913.

== Climate ==
Climate data for Tutira (1991–2020)
Month	Jan	Feb	Mar	Apr	May	Jun	Jul	Aug	Sep	Oct	Nov	Dec	Year
Mean daily maximum °C (°F)	23.3 (73.9)	22.5 (72.5)	20.6 (69.1)	17.9 (64.2)	15.7 (60.3)	13.1 (55.6)	12.3 (54.1)	13.0 (55.4)	14.9 (58.8)	17.6 (63.7)	19.0 (66.2)	20.9 (69.6)	17.6 (63.6)
Daily mean °C (°F)	18.1 (64.6)	17.9 (64.2)	15.9 (60.6)	13.6 (56.5)	11.5 (52.7)	9.0 (48.2)	8.2 (46.8)	8.9 (48.0)	10.6 (51.1)	12.7 (54.9)	14.2 (57.6)	16.3 (61.3)	13.1 (55.5)
Mean daily minimum °C (°F)	12.9 (55.2)	13.3 (55.9)	11.2 (52.2)	9.3 (48.7)	7.2 (45.0)	4.8 (40.6)	4.1 (39.4)	4.7 (40.5)	6.3 (43.3)	7.8 (46.0)	9.4 (48.9)	11.6 (52.9)	8.5 (47.4)
Average rainfall mm (inches)	90.5 (3.56)	68.4 (2.69)	92.0 (3.62)	124.2 (4.89)	80.7 (3.18)	121.3 (4.78)	145.1 (5.71)	121.5 (4.78)	136.8 (5.39)	69.4 (2.73)	103.2 (4.06)	76.0 (2.99)	1,229.1 (48.38)
Source: NIWA
