= Pātoka, New Zealand =

Pātoka
- Settlement
- Interactive map of Pātoka
- Coordinates: 39.347°S 176.605°E
- Country: New Zealand
- Region: Hawke's Bay Region
- Territorial authority: Hastings District
- Ward: Mohaka General Ward; Takitimu Māori Ward
- Community: Hastings District Rural Community
- Subdivision: Kaweka subdivision
- Electorates: Napier; Ikaroa-Rāwhiti (Māori)

Government
  - Territorial Authority: Hastings District Council
  - Mayor of Hastings: Wendy Schollum
  - Napier MP: Katie Nimon
  - Ikaroa-Rāwhiti MP: Cushla Tangaere-Manuel

Area
  - Total: 89.44 km^{2} (34.53 sq mi)

Population (2023 Census)
  - Total: 165
  - Density: 1.84/km^{2} (4.78/sq mi)
- Postcode(s): 4181

Pātoka is a rural community in the Hastings District and Hawke's Bay Region of New Zealand's North Island. It is located at base of the Kaweka Range and Kaweka Forest Park.

The area has been used for pastoral sheep and dairy farming since the 19th century. It promotes itself on its rolling countryside, high rainfall and free-draining paddocks.

== Demographics ==
Pātoka and its surrounds cover 89.44 km^{2} (34.53 sq mi). It is part of the Puketitiri-Tutira statistical area.

Historical population
Year	Pop.	±% p.a.
2006	159	—
2013	138	−2.00%
2018	144	+0.85%
2023	165	+2.76%

Pātoka had a population of 165 in the 2023 New Zealand census, an increase of 21 people (14.6%) since the 2018 census, and an increase of 27 people (19.6%) since the 2013 census. There were 84 males and 78 females in 51 dwellings. 1.8% of people identified as LGBTIQ+. The median age was 34.6 years (compared with 38.1 years nationally). There were 51 people (30.9%) aged under 15 years, 27 (16.4%) aged 15 to 29, 72 (43.6%) aged 30 to 64, and 15 (9.1%) aged 65 or older.

People could identify as more than one ethnicity. The results were 94.5% European (Pākehā), 23.6% Māori, and 3.6% Pasifika. English was spoken by 98.2%, Māori by 3.6%, Samoan by 1.8%, and other languages by 3.6%. No language could be spoken by 1.8% (e.g. too young to talk). The percentage of people born overseas was 9.1, compared with 28.8% nationally.

Religious affiliations were 16.4% Christian. People who answered that they had no religion were 76.4%, and 1.8% of people did not answer the census question.

Of those at least 15 years old, 21 (18.4%) people had a bachelor's or higher degree, 75 (65.8%) had a post-high school certificate or diploma, and 21 (18.4%) people exclusively held high school qualifications. The median income was $52,500, compared with $41,500 nationally. 9 people (7.9%) earned over $100,000 compared to 12.1% nationally. The employment status of those at least 15 was 72 (63.2%) full-time, 15 (13.2%) part-time, and 3 (2.6%) unemployed.

== Education ==
Pātoka School is a co-educational state primary school, with a roll of 32 as of July 2026. It opened in 1902.
