= Te Aute railway station =

Railway station in New Zealand

Te Aute
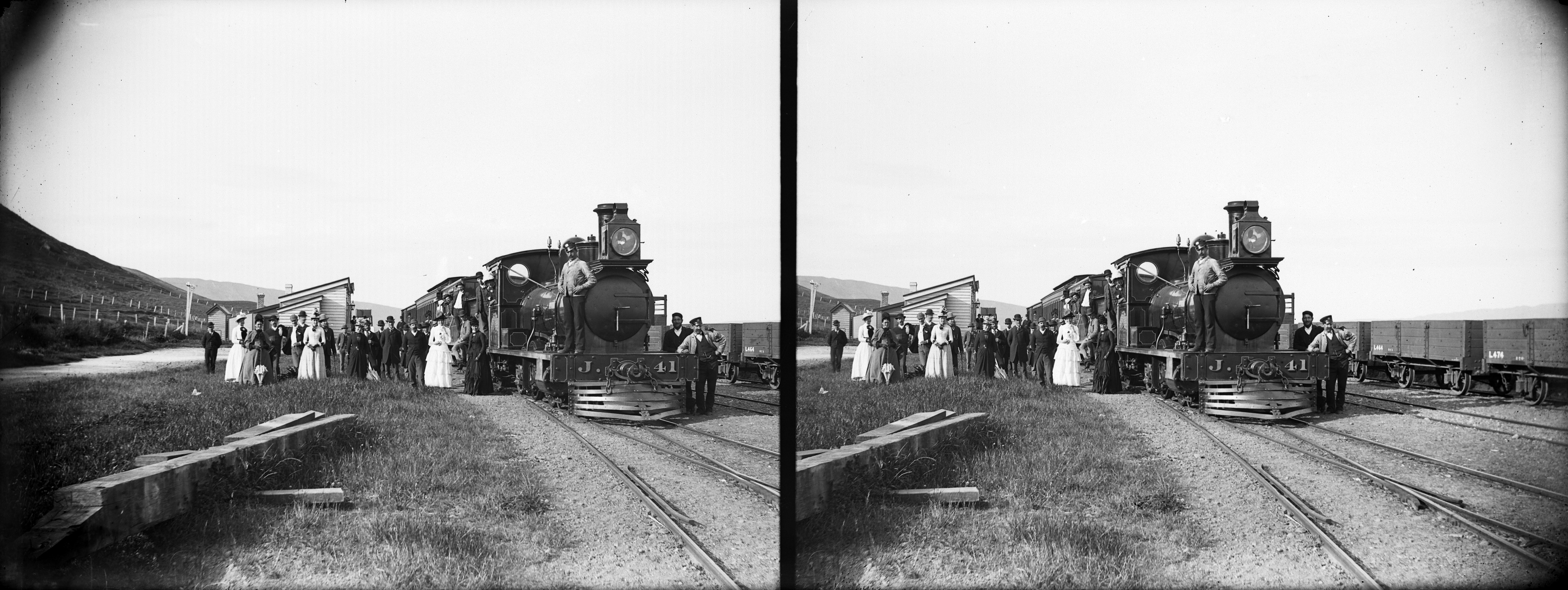
- Stereograph of NZR J class (1874) at Te Aute Station during a trial run from Napier to Waipukurau in 1887

General information
- Coordinates: 39°47′35″S 176°40′37″E
- Elevation: 28 m (92 ft)
- System: New Zealand Government Railways (NZGR) regional rail
- Owner: KiwiRail
- Line: Palmerston North–Gisborne Line
- Distance: Palmerston North 138.38 km (85.99 mi)

History
- Opened: 16 February 1876
- Closed: 27 September 1981
- Former names: Opapa; 14 September 1913 to 12 June 1997; Te Nahu 1912–1913

Services
Preceding station	Historical railways	Following station
Pukehou; Line open, station closed 7.09 km (4.41 mi)	Palmerston North–Gisborne Line; KiwiRail	Te Hauke; Line open, station closed 2.2 km (1.4 mi)
Location

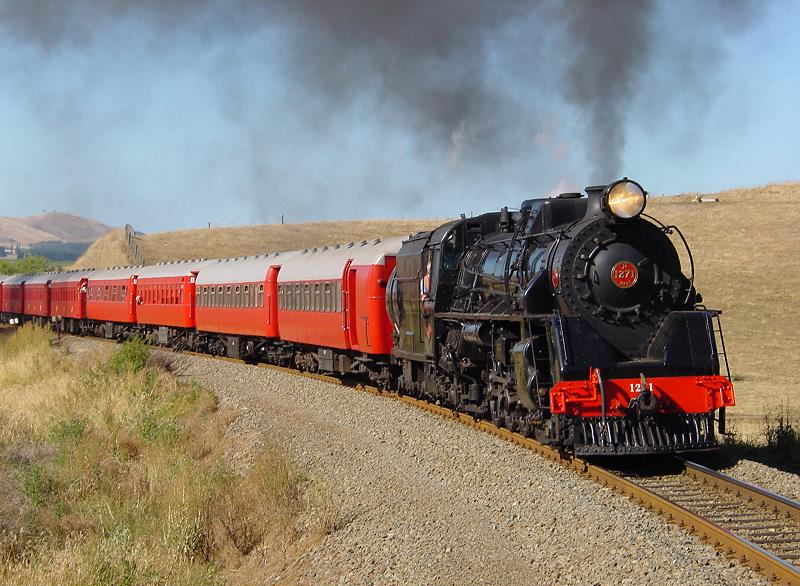
J^{A} class on Opapa bank in 2003

Opapa (or Te Aute) railway station is a preserved station on the Palmerston North–Gisborne Line in New Zealand's North Island that closed in 1981. It is in the Hastings District of Hawke's Bay, 23.56 km (14.64 mi) south of Hastings city, in a census meshblock with a population of only 222 in 2018.

Te Aute is unusual in three respects:

- It is one of less than 40 wooden stations remaining on their original sites.
- In 1898 it was one of only 18 stations with a refreshment room.
- An official name change restored its original name of Te Aute, after being known as Opapa from 14 September 1913 to 12 June 1997.

Nearby the railway climbs a steep bank and there is a radio mast, an old shop and a lake.

== History ==
=== Name ===
There has been some confusion around the name of Te Aute. On 8 December 1912 the name of the next station, Pukehou, was changed to Te Aute (Te Aute College is near Pukehou) and Te Aute was changed to Te Nahu. Then, on 14 September 1913 the name was changed to Opapa and Pukehou reverted to its original name. It was reported in 1915 that the new name was still not popular, as it had been defaced 9 times. From the 1930s the address 'Te Aute, Opapa' was sometimes used.

=== Construction and alterations ===
Te Aute station was first built between 1874 and 1876. It was part of the Paki Paki to Waipukurau contract, tendered on 15 July 1874 for £19,532 by Charles McKirdy, of Wellington, who built the Rimutaka Incline and several other lines. A local contractor tendered £29,173. There were allegations of mismanagement and disputes about the contracts. However, in 1876, the Minister for Public Works, Edward Richardson, attributed delays only to unexpectedly heavy land claims and floods. S Tracey and Allen, of Napier, tendered £7,989 for track for the Paki Paki-Waipawa length in September 1875. Te Aute station was tendered on 12 April 1875, the platform on 17 May and the goods shed on 25 August. Joseph Sowrey got the £195 contract to build the station on 30 August and completed it by 29 October, the £485, 40 ft (12 m) x 30 ft (9.1 m) goods shed by 14 February 1876 and a water tank by 26 May 1876. McLeod & Co built a 5th class stationmaster's house and loading platform by 26 October 1875. There was a Post Office at the station from 1885 to 1949, with a telephone from 1914.

On 10 October 1895 a fire started in the refreshment rooms and burnt down the station, but just 6 days later authority was given for a new station. By 1896 Te Aute had a 5th class station, platform, cart approach, loading bank, cattle and sheep yards, fixed signals, stationmaster's house, urinals and a passing loop for 36 wagons. In 1912 an automatic tablet exchanger was added. Railway houses were built in 1926, 1934, 1938 and 1948. In the 1931 earthquake the station was described as badly wrecked. Electric lighting came in 1940.

=== Refreshment rooms ===
Refreshment rooms were added in 1878. In 1882 the station was described as, "utterly miserable and inadequate both in regards office and waiting accommodation, the telegraph wants accommodation, and the refreshment building unsuitable, does not belong to Department, and the owners ask too much for it". Some buildings were moved from Hastings in 1883, but not a refreshment room. In 1885 the refreshment room licensee raised the roof and made improvements. From 22 March 1887 trains stopped for at least 5 minutes at Te Aute. Complaints were made in 1896 that trains didn't stop long enough for refreshments. In 1889 £175 was spent to add a ladies room.

In November 1895 £45 was approved for erecting railway-owned refreshment rooms to replace the burnt ones. From then on they were let by 3-yearly tenders, until at least 1912. A 2010 guide said the rooms were open from 1897 to 1945. The refreshment rooms were at the north end of the platform, separate from the main building. Aerial photos indicate that the rooms were demolished between 1965 and 1972.

=== Services ===
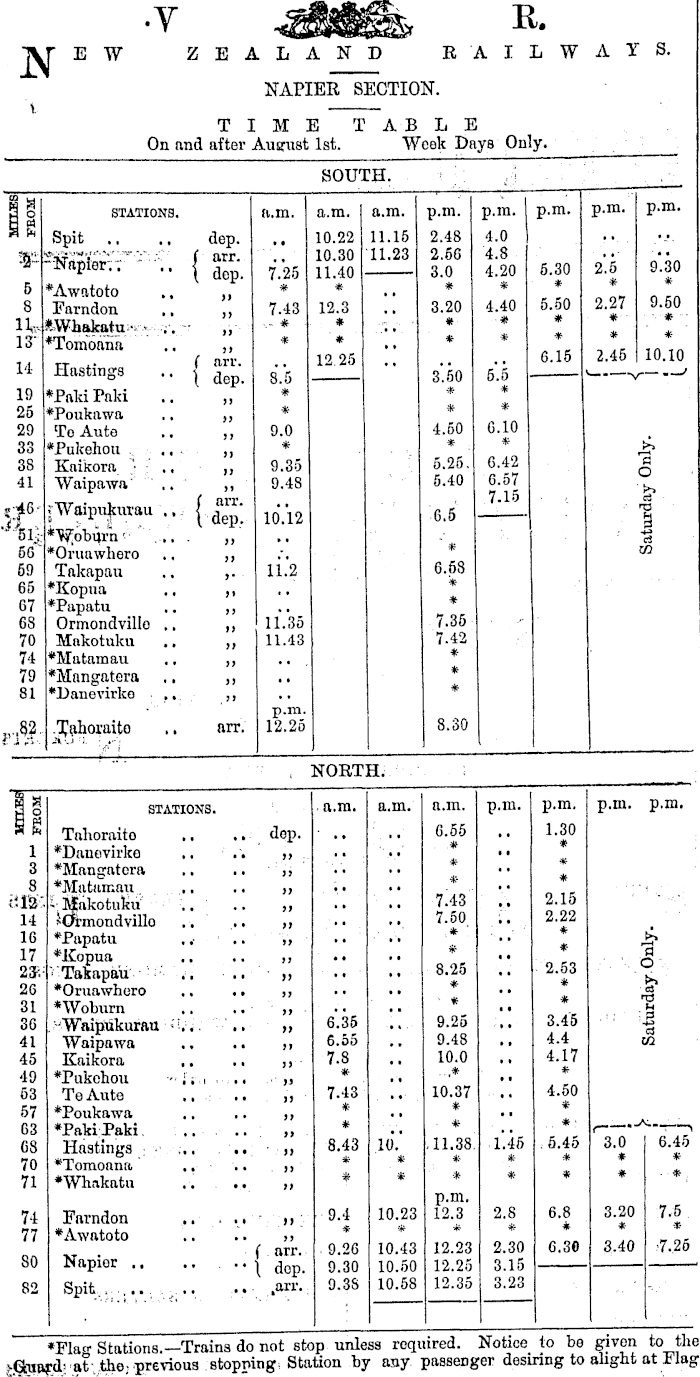
Te Aute had 3 trains in 1885

Initially Te Aute was a temporary terminus, 28 mi (45 km) from Spit. It isn't clear when the extension from Paki Paki opened. It may have been 11, or 12 February, though Parliament was told opening was on 16 February 1876. Whichever, it seems the passenger trains still ran only to Paki Paki, at least until late March 1876 and Te Aute continued to be served by a mail coach, the horses being changed at Te Aute. The train/coach journey from Napier to Wellington then took 2½ days. Te Aute remained the terminus until Monday 28 August 1876, when the line was extended to Waipawa. Te Aute then had 3 trains a day in each direction, reduced to 2 in 1881 and back to 3 in 1883. From the opening of the link to Wellington in 1891, Te Aute had 4 trains a day in each direction, which continued in 1896. Opapa featured in annual returns from 1895 to 1918, when it lost its officered station status. For example, in 1917 Opapa issued 3,077 tickets and loaded 69,137 sheep.

=== Closure and restoration ===
The station closed to passengers in about 1966 and the goods yard was lifted in 1981. Tablet control ended in 1991.

In 1994 a few people started restoring the station and, in 1996, formed Friends of Opapa Railway Station Incorporated Society. The Society re-piled the station in 1998 and replaced fascias, gutters, wall boards and toilets in 1999, but was dissolved in 2004. Opapa Railway Heritage Trust had replaced it in 2015.

=== Te Aute bank ===
Te Aute has a 1 in 46 gradient to the south of it, Pukehou being 51 m (167 ft) higher than Te Aute. To give trains a faster run at the bank, the curve at its foot was eased from 10 ch (200 m) to 21 ch (420 m) in 1938.

== Incidents ==
- On 22 September 1925, three people were killed in the derailment of a Wellington to Napier express train on Opapa bank. The express was hauled by A Class 600, derailed in a shallow cutting. It was found to have been exceeding the 25 mph (40 km/h) speed limit on a 7 ch (140 m) bend. The Commission of Inquiry recommended that gas lighting be replaced by electric on express trains, as the Pintsch gas had set fire to 5 of the derailed coaches. The conversion of lighting was said to be speeding up, but conversion from Pintsch to coal gas was made as late as 1932. The driver was imprisoned for 2 years for manslaughter. A freight train had come off the line at the same spot on 21 February 1920, derailing 10 wagons and killing about 200 sheep.

On 25 October 1996 a gangway fell off from between the coaches of a Steam Incorporated excursion, whilst descending the bank.

== Top Opapa/Te Aute Grade Siding ==
Top Te Aute Grade Siding opened about June 1877 and was closed by 1993. It too had a name change on 14 September 1913 to Top Te Opapa Grade Siding. The siding was at the top of the 1 in 46 gradient, 3.25 km (2.02 mi) south of Te Aute. An interlocking tablet was installed in 1923.

== Te Aute Store ==
About 1.6 km (0.99 mi) to the south, beside SH2, Te Aute Store was in business from 1858 to 1982. It was registered as a Category I 'Historic Place' with the New Zealand Historic Places Trust on 28 June 1990, who suggest it may have been the longest continuing single business in a wooden building in the country. However, that assessment doesn't mention that a store next to Te Aute Hotel burnt down in 1883. The Hotel burnt down in 1880 and 1936, when the current hotel was rebuilt.

== Opapa Broadcasting Station ==
Also to the south, a 600 ft (180 m) high radio transmitter and Art Deco broadcasting station were built in 1938. 2YH began broadcasting on 17 November 1938 and became 2YZ in 1948. The manager's house has gone, but the aerials and hall remain.

== See also ==
- Lake Poukawa
- List of radio stations in Hawke's Bay
- RNZ National
