= Te Haroto =

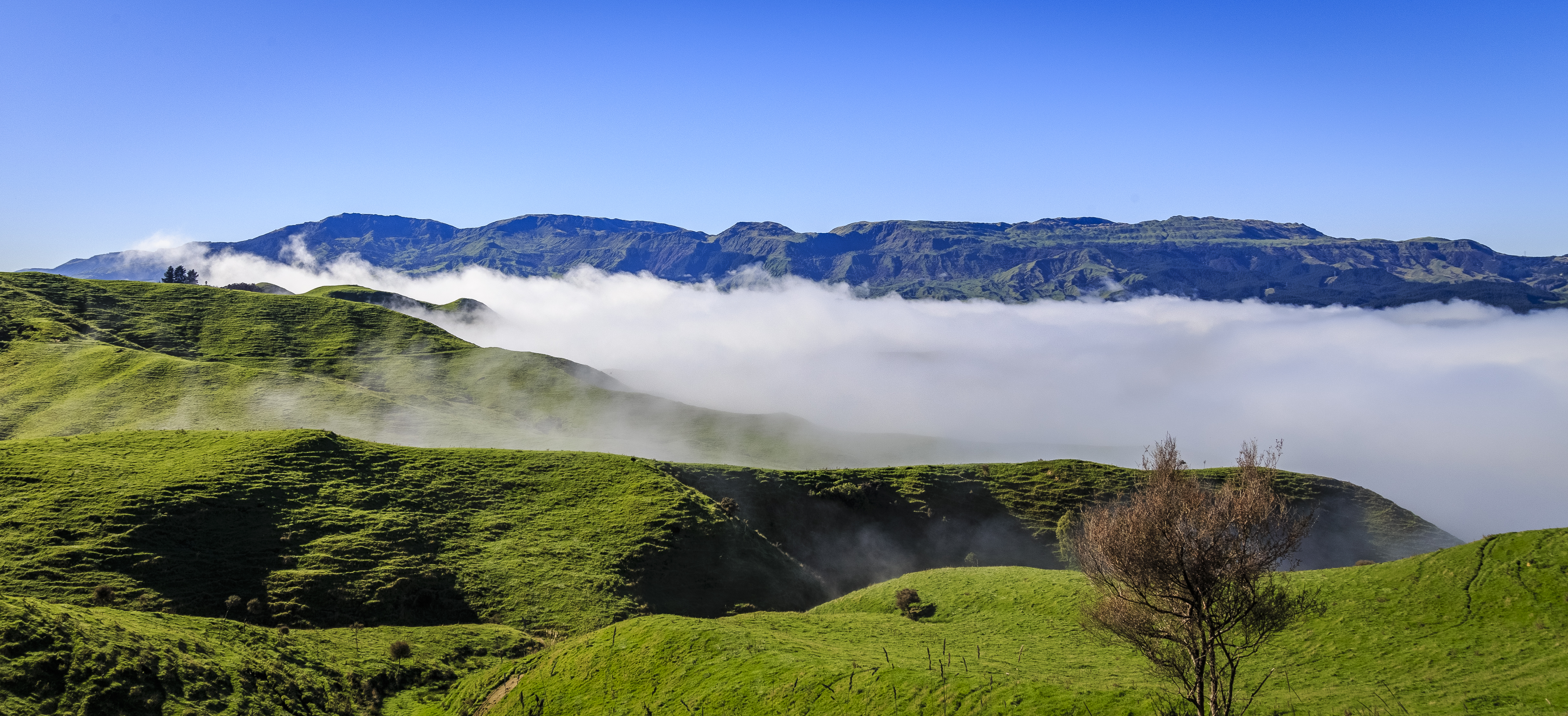
- Scenery from the Napier-Taupō Road near Te Haroto
- Interactive map of Te Haroto
- Coordinates: 39.126°S 176.607°E
- Country: New Zealand
- Region: Hawke's Bay Region
- District: Hastings District
- Ward: Mohaka General Ward; Takitimu Māori Ward
- Community: Hastings District Rural Community
- Subdivision: Tūtira subdivision
- Electorates: Napier; Ikaroa-Rāwhiti (Māori)

Government
  - Territorial Authority: Hastings District Council
  - Mayor of Hastings: Wendy Schollum
  - Napier MP: Katie Nimon
  - Ikaroa-Rāwhiti MP: Cushla Tangaere-Manuel

Area
  - Total: 946.58 km^{2} (365.48 sq mi)

Population (2023 Census)
  - Total: 93
  - Density: 0.098/km^{2} (0.25/sq mi)

Te Haroto is a rural community in the Hastings District and Hawke's Bay Region of New Zealand's North Island.

It is located roughly 60 kilometres northwest of Napier and southeast of Taupō on State Highway 5 Napier-Taupō Road.

The main village centres around Te Hāroto Marae. Te Rongopai is the wharepuni (meeting house) and Piriwiritua is the wharekai (dining hall) a meeting place for the iwi (tribe) of Ngāti Hineuru.

The New Zealand Ministry for Culture and Heritage gives a translation of "the pool" for Te Hāroto.

== Demographics ==
Te Haroto and its surrounds cover 946.58 km^{2} (365.48 sq mi). It is part of the Puketitiri-Tutira statistical area.

Historical population
Year	Pop.	±% p.a.
2006	111	—
2013	99	−1.62%
2018	102	+0.60%
2023	93	−1.83%

Te Haroto had a population of 93 in the 2023 New Zealand census, a decrease of 9 people (−8.8%) since the 2018 census, and a decrease of 6 people (−6.1%) since the 2013 census. There were 51 males and 42 females in 24 dwellings. The median age was 43.5 years (compared with 38.1 years nationally). There were 15 people (16.1%) aged under 15 years, 18 (19.4%) aged 15 to 29, 48 (51.6%) aged 30 to 64, and 15 (16.1%) aged 65 or older.

People could identify as more than one ethnicity. The results were 64.5% European (Pākehā), 61.3% Māori, and 3.2% Pasifika. English was spoken by 96.8%, Māori by 9.7%, and other languages by 3.2%. No language could be spoken by 3.2% (e.g. too young to talk). New Zealand Sign Language was known by 3.2%. The percentage of people born overseas was 3.2, compared with 28.8% nationally.

Religious affiliations were 25.8% Christian, and 6.5% Māori religious beliefs. People who answered that they had no religion were 58.1%, and 9.7% of people did not answer the census question.

Of those at least 15 years old, 3 (3.8%) people had a bachelor's or higher degree, 51 (65.4%) had a post-high school certificate or diploma, and 18 (23.1%) people exclusively held high school qualifications. The median income was $25,900, compared with $41,500 nationally. 6 people (7.7%) earned over $100,000 compared to 12.1% nationally. The employment status of those at least 15 was 36 (46.2%) full-time and 15 (19.2%) part-time.
