= Pakowhai =

Settlement in Hawke's Bay Region, New Zealand

- Settlement
- Interactive map of Pakowhai
- Coordinates: 39.581280°S 176.866974°E
- Country: New Zealand
- Region: Hawke's Bay Region
- Territorial authority: Hastings District
- Ward: Heretaunga General Ward; Takitimu Māori Ward
- Electorates: Napier; Ikaroa-Rāwhiti (Māori)

Government
  - Territorial Authority: Hastings District Council
  - Regional council: Hawke's Bay Regional Council
  - Mayor of Hastings: Wendy Schollum
  - Napier MP: Katie Nimon
  - Ikaroa-Rāwhiti MP: Cushla Tangaere-Manuel

Area
  - Total: 22.90 km^{2} (8.84 sq mi)

Population (2023 Census)
  - Total: 222
  - Density: 9.69/km^{2} (25.1/sq mi)
- Postcode(s): 4183

Pakowhai is a small settlement in the Hastings District and Hawke's Bay Region of New Zealand's North Island. It is a located between Napier and Hastings, north of the Ngaruroro River.

Mission Estate Winery established its first vineyard in Hawke's Bay at Pakowhai in 1851.

The Pakowhai Regional Park is located on the river's south bank. It is a country park, with dog-walking areas and agility features. It hosts community planting days, and attracts kākā from inland mountains.

A new petrol station was controversially proposed for the area in 2019.

Pakowhai was inundated by flooding during Cyclone Gabrielle in 2023 after the Ngaruroro River burst its banks. Dozen of houses were destroyed.

== Demographics ==
Pakowhai covers 22.90 km^{2} (8.84 sq mi). It is part of Omahu-Pakowhai statistical area.

Historical population for Pakowhai
Year	Pop.	±% p.a.
2006	378	—
2013	315	−2.57%
2018	300	−0.97%
2023	222	−5.84%
The 2006 population is for a larger area of 24.51 km^{2}. Source:

Pakowhai had a population of 222 in the 2023 New Zealand census, a decrease of 78 people (−26.0%) since the 2018 census, and a decrease of 93 people (−29.5%) since the 2013 census. There were 111 males and 108 females in 15 dwellings. There were 33 people (14.9%) aged under 15 years, 39 (17.6%) aged 15 to 29, 102 (45.9%) aged 30 to 64, and 54 (24.3%) aged 65 or older.

People could identify as more than one ethnicity. The results were 78.4% European (Pākehā), 17.6% Māori, 4.1% Pasifika, 8.1% Asian, and 8.1% other, which includes people giving their ethnicity as "New Zealander". English was spoken by 100.0%, Māori by 2.7%, and other languages by 8.1%. New Zealand Sign Language was known by 1.4%. The percentage of people born overseas was 14.9, compared with 28.8% nationally.

Religious affiliations were 28.4% Christian, 1.4% Hindu, 2.7% Māori religious beliefs, 1.4% Buddhist, and 1.4% New Age. People who answered that they had no religion were 55.4%, and 10.8% of people did not answer the census question.

Of those at least 15 years old, 48 (25.4%) people had a bachelor's or higher degree, 117 (61.9%) had a post-high school certificate or diploma, and 42 (22.2%) people exclusively held high school qualifications. 24 people (12.7%) earned over $100,000 compared to 12.1% nationally. The employment status of those at least 15 was 90 (47.6%) full-time, 27 (14.3%) part-time, and 3 (1.6%) unemployed.

=== Omahu-Pakowhai statistical area ===
Omahu-Pakowhai statistical area, which includes Omahu and Waiohiki, covers 57.13 km^{2} (22.06 sq mi) and had an estimated population of 1,530 as of June 2025, with a population density of 27 people per km^{2}.

Historical population for Omahu-Pakowhai
Year	Pop.	±% p.a.
2006	1,161	—
2013	1,413	+2.85%
2018	1,797	+4.93%
2023	1,560	−2.79%
The 2006 population is for a smaller area of 45.78 km^{2}. Source:

Omahu-Pakowhai had a population of 1,560 in the 2023 New Zealand census, a decrease of 237 people (−13.2%) since the 2018 census, and an increase of 147 people (10.4%) since the 2013 census. There were 792 males, 762 females, and 6 people of other genders in 333 dwellings. 1.2% of people identified as LGBTIQ+. The median age was 46.4 years (compared with 38.1 years nationally). There were 249 people (16.0%) aged under 15 years, 249 (16.0%) aged 15 to 29, 774 (49.6%) aged 30 to 64, and 288 (18.5%) aged 65 or older.

People could identify as more than one ethnicity. The results were 63.7% European (Pākehā); 46.2% Māori; 4.2% Pasifika; 2.5% Asian; 0.6% Middle Eastern, Latin American and African New Zealanders (MELAA); and 2.3% other, which includes people giving their ethnicity as "New Zealander". English was spoken by 97.7%, Māori by 17.5%, Samoan by 1.3%, and other languages by 4.8%. No language could be spoken by 1.0% (e.g. too young to talk). New Zealand Sign Language was known by 0.8%. The percentage of people born overseas was 9.2, compared with 28.8% nationally.

Religious affiliations were 38.5% Christian, 0.2% Hindu, 0.2% Islam, 6.0% Māori religious beliefs, 0.2% Buddhist, 0.4% New Age, and 0.6% other religions. People who answered that they had no religion were 48.8%, and 5.4% of people did not answer the census question.

Of those at least 15 years old, 243 (18.5%) people had a bachelor's or higher degree, 762 (58.1%) had a post-high school certificate or diploma, and 309 (23.6%) people exclusively held high school qualifications. The median income was $40,500, compared with $41,500 nationally. 132 people (10.1%) earned over $100,000 compared to 12.1% nationally. The employment status of those at least 15 was 678 (51.7%) full-time, 156 (11.9%) part-time, and 54 (4.1%) unemployed.

== Education ==
Pakowhai School is a Year 1-6 co-educational state primary school, with a roll of 37 as of July 2026. The school was established in 1895.
