= Puketapu, Hawke's Bay =

Locality on North Island, New Zealand

Puketapu
- Settlement
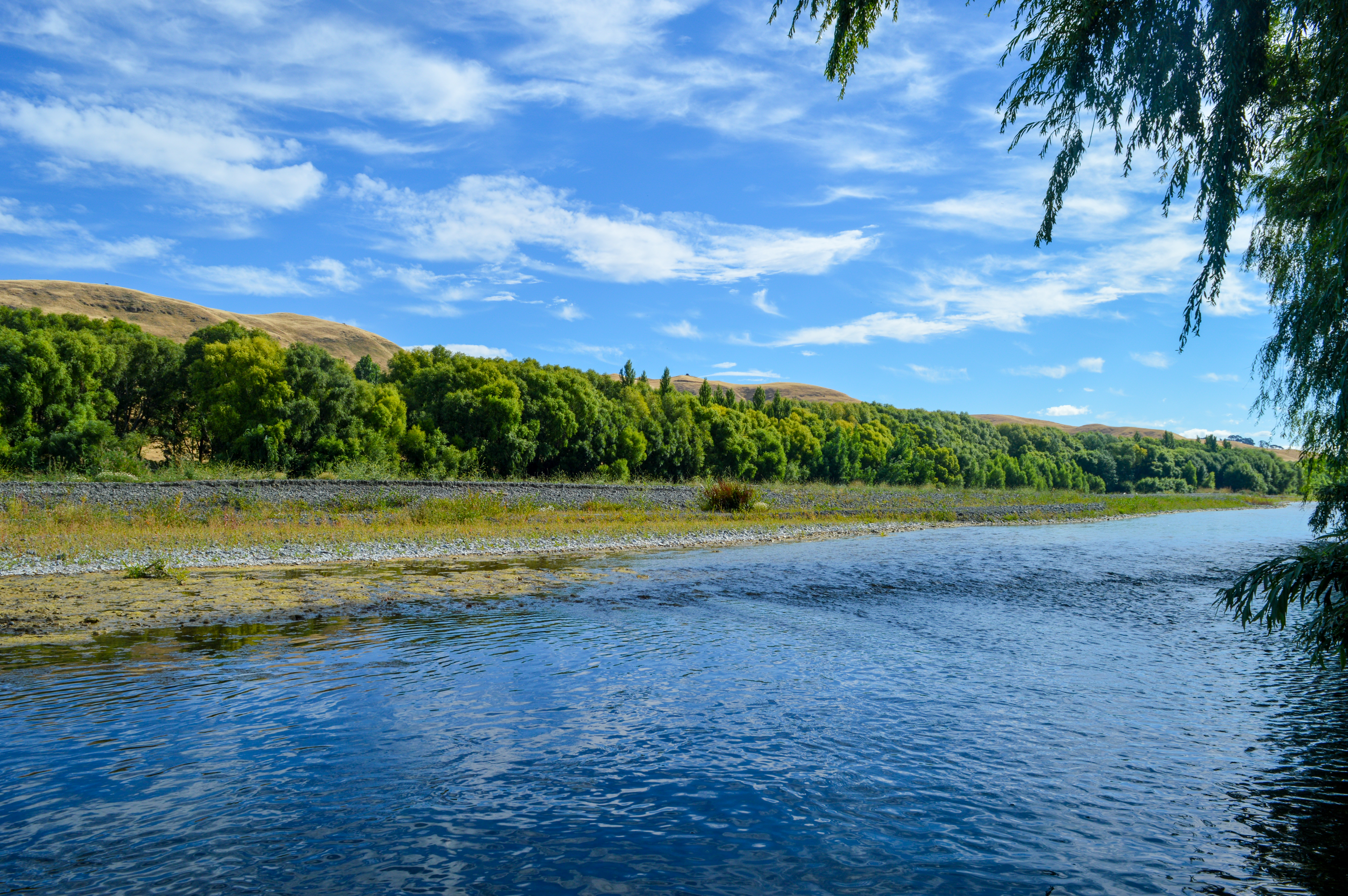
- The Tūtaekurī River seen from Puketapu
- Interactive map of Puketapu
- Coordinates: 39.509°S 176.792°E
- Country: New Zealand
- Region: Hawke's Bay Region
- Territorial authority: Hastings District
- Ward: Mohaka General Ward; Takitimu Māori Ward
- Community: Hastings District Rural Community
- Subdivision: Kaweka subdivision
- Electorates: Napier; Ikaroa-Rāwhiti (Māori)

Government
  - Territorial Authority: Hastings District Council
  - Mayor of Hastings: Wendy Schollum
  - Napier MP: Katie Nimon
  - Ikaroa-Rāwhiti MP: Cushla Tangaere-Manuel

Area
  - Total: 25.81 km^{2} (9.97 sq mi)

Population (2023 Census)
  - Total: 348
  - Density: 13.5/km^{2} (34.9/sq mi)
- Postcode(s): 4183, 4186

Puketapu is a rural community in the Hastings District and Hawke's Bay Region of New Zealand's North Island.

It is located west of Napier and north of Hastings.

In February 2023 Puketapu was severely affected by flooding from Cyclone Gabrielle. Water from the Tūtaekurī River rose above homes and damaged much of the agricultural land. The bridge across the river at Vicarage Road was swept away. In August 2025, a replacement bridge was completed.

== Demographics ==
Puketapu and its surrounds cover 25.81 km^{2} (9.97 sq mi). It is part of the Puketitiri-Tutira statistical area.

Historical population
| Year | Pop. | ±% p.a. |
|---|---|---|
| 2006 | 405 | — |
| 2013 | 357 | −1.79% |
| 2018 | 387 | +1.63% |
| 2023 | 348 | −2.10% |
The 2006 population is for a larger area of 31.09 km^{2}. Source:

Puketapu had a population of 348 in the 2023 New Zealand census, a decrease of 39 people (−10.1%) since the 2018 census, and a decrease of 9 people (−2.5%) since the 2013 census. There were 174 males, 177 females, and 3 people of other genders in 90 dwellings. 1.7% of people identified as LGBTIQ+. There were 60 people (17.2%) aged under 15 years, 48 (13.8%) aged 15 to 29, 165 (47.4%) aged 30 to 64, and 75 (21.6%) aged 65 or older.

People could identify as more than one ethnicity. The results were 95.7% European (Pākehā); 10.3% Māori; 1.7% Pasifika; 1.7% Asian; 0.9% Middle Eastern, Latin American and African New Zealanders (MELAA); and 1.7% other, which includes people giving their ethnicity as "New Zealander". English was spoken by 99.1%, Māori by 1.7%, and other languages by 4.3%. No language could be spoken by 1.7% (e.g. too young to talk). The percentage of people born overseas was 14.7, compared with 28.8% nationally.

Religious affiliations were 28.4% Christian, 0.9% Māori religious beliefs, 0.9% New Age, and 1.7% other religions. People who answered that they had no religion were 62.1%, and 6.0% of people did not answer the census question.

Of those at least 15 years old, 84 (29.2%) people had a bachelor's or higher degree, 165 (57.3%) had a post-high school certificate or diploma, and 42 (14.6%) people exclusively held high school qualifications. 42 people (14.6%) earned over $100,000 compared to 12.1% nationally. The employment status of those at least 15 was 162 (56.2%) full-time, 45 (15.6%) part-time, and 6 (2.1%) unemployed.

== Marae ==
The community has four Ngāti Kahungunu marae:

- Hamuera or Moteo Marae and Rangimarie meeting house is a meeting place of Ngāti Hinepare and Ngāti Māhu.
- Rūnanga Marae and Te Aroha meeting house is a meeting place of Ngāi Te Ūpokoiri, Ngāti Hinemanu and Ngāti Mahuika.
- Timikara Marae and Te Whānau Pani meeting house is a meeting place of Ngāti Hinepare and Ngāti Māhu.
- Wharerangi Marae and Manahau meeting house is a meeting place of Tāwhao and Ngāti Hinepare. The new Manahau meeting house opened in 2022.

In October 2020, the Government committed $6,020,910 from the Provincial Growth Fund to upgrade a group of 18 marae, including the four Puketapu marae. The funding was expected to create 39 jobs.

== Education ==
Puketapu School is a co-educational state primary school, with a roll of 231 as of July 2026. It opened in 1864.

== Economy ==
Puketapu is primarily an agricultural settlement, though it is also home to the headquarters of SL Racing, manufacturers of race rowing equipment.
