= Geddis =

Geddis may refer to:

- Andrew Geddis, business man and sports enthusiast in Bombay prior to Indian independence
- David Geddis, former professional football player turned football coach and scout
- Jeff Geddis, Canadian film and television actor
- William Duncan Geddis, a unionist politician in Northern Ireland
- William Geddis (New Zealand politician), member of the New Zealand Legislative Council and journalist
