= Poukawa =

Settlement in Hawke's Bay Region, New Zealand

- Settlement
- Interactive map of Poukawa
- Coordinates: 39.759°S 176.723°E
- Country: New Zealand
- Region: Hawke's Bay Region
- Territorial authority: Hastings District
- Ward: Kahurānaki General Ward; Takitimu Māori Ward
- Community: Hastings District Rural Community
- Subdivision: Poukawa Subdivision
- Electorates: Tukituki; Ikaroa-Rāwhiti (Māori)

Government
  - Territorial Authority: Hastings District Council
  - Regional council: Hawke's Bay Regional Council
  - Mayor of Hastings: Wendy Schollum
  - Tukituki MP: Catherine Wedd
  - Ikaroa-Rāwhiti MP: Cushla Tangaere-Manuel

Area
  - Total: 169.27 km^{2} (65.36 sq mi)

Population (2023)
  - Total: 897
  - Density: 5.30/km^{2} (13.7/sq mi)
- Postcode(s): 4178

Poukawa is a rural community in the Hastings District and Hawke's Bay Region of New Zealand's North Island.

It is located south of Hastings, off State Highway 2.

== Demographics ==
Poukawa community covers 169.27 km^{2} (65.36 sq mi). It is part of the larger Poukawa statistical area.

Historical population for Poukawa community
| Year | Pop. | ±% p.a. |
|---|---|---|
| 2006 | 717 | — |
| 2013 | 690 | −0.55% |
| 2018 | 765 | +2.09% |
| 2023 | 897 | +3.23% |

The community had a population of 897 in the 2023 New Zealand census, an increase of 132 people (17.3%) since the 2018 census, and an increase of 207 people (30.0%) since the 2013 census. There were 453 males, 441 females, and 3 people of other genders in 294 dwellings. 1.3% of people identified as LGBTIQ+. There were 180 people (20.1%) aged under 15 years, 150 (16.7%) aged 15 to 29, 423 (47.2%) aged 30 to 64, and 141 (15.7%) aged 65 or older.

People could identify as more than one ethnicity. The results were 88.0% European (Pākehā); 23.1% Māori; 2.3% Pasifika; 1.7% Asian; 0.3% Middle Eastern, Latin American and African New Zealanders (MELAA); and 2.0% other, which includes people giving their ethnicity as "New Zealander". English was spoken by 98.0%, Māori by 4.7%, Samoan by 1.0%, and other languages by 7.0%. No language could be spoken by 1.3% (e.g. too young to talk). New Zealand Sign Language was known by 0.7%. The percentage of people born overseas was 14.0, compared with 28.8% nationally.

Religious affiliations were 37.1% Christian, 1.3% Māori religious beliefs, and 1.3% other religions. People who answered that they had no religion were 55.2%, and 5.0% of people did not answer the census question.

Of those at least 15 years old, 201 (28.0%) people had a bachelor's or higher degree, 399 (55.6%) had a post-high school certificate or diploma, and 126 (17.6%) people exclusively held high school qualifications. 123 people (17.2%) earned over $100,000 compared to 12.1% nationally. The employment status of those at least 15 was 393 (54.8%) full-time, 129 (18.0%) part-time, and 18 (2.5%) unemployed.

=== Poukawa statistical area ===
Poukawa statistical area covers 339.92 km^{2} (131.24 sq mi) and had an estimated population of 1,620 as of June 2025, with a population density of 4.8 people per km^{2}.

Historical population for Poukawa statistical area
| Year | Pop. | ±% p.a. |
|---|---|---|
| 2006 | 1,293 | — |
| 2013 | 1,272 | −0.23% |
| 2018 | 1,365 | +1.42% |
| 2023 | 1,569 | +2.82% |

The statistical area had a population of 1,569 in the 2023 New Zealand census, an increase of 204 people (14.9%) since the 2018 census, and an increase of 297 people (23.3%) since the 2013 census. There were 804 males, 759 females, and 6 people of other genders in 540 dwellings. 1.7% of people identified as LGBTIQ+. The median age was 44.2 years (compared with 38.1 years nationally). There were 282 people (18.0%) aged under 15 years, 261 (16.6%) aged 15 to 29, 762 (48.6%) aged 30 to 64, and 264 (16.8%) aged 65 or older.

People could identify as more than one ethnicity. The results were 83.4% European (Pākehā); 25.0% Māori; 2.9% Pasifika; 1.9% Asian; 0.6% Middle Eastern, Latin American and African New Zealanders (MELAA); and 1.1% other, which includes people giving their ethnicity as "New Zealander". English was spoken by 97.5%, Māori by 5.9%, Samoan by 0.8%, and other languages by 7.1%. No language could be spoken by 1.3% (e.g. too young to talk). New Zealand Sign Language was known by 0.8%. The percentage of people born overseas was 14.9, compared with 28.8% nationally.

Religious affiliations were 35.9% Christian, 0.2% Islam, 3.3% Māori religious beliefs, and 1.5% other religions. People who answered that they had no religion were 54.5%, and 4.6% of people did not answer the census question.

Of those at least 15 years old, 339 (26.3%) people had a bachelor's or higher degree, 690 (53.6%) had a post-high school certificate or diploma, and 255 (19.8%) people exclusively held high school qualifications. The median income was $48,200, compared with $41,500 nationally. 183 people (14.2%) earned over $100,000 compared to 12.1% nationally. The employment status of those at least 15 was 738 (57.3%) full-time, 201 (15.6%) part-time, and 30 (2.3%) unemployed.

== Marae ==
The community has two Ngāti Kahungunu marae.

Te Whatuiāpiti Marae and meeting house is a meeting place of Ngāti Whatuiāpiti. In October 2020, the Government committed $887,291 from the Provincial Growth Fund to upgrade the marae and 4 others, creating 12 jobs.

Kahurānaki Marae and Kahurānaki meeting house is a meeting place of Ngāi Te Rangikoianake and Ngāti Whatuiāpiti. In October 2020, the Government committed $6,020,910 to upgrade Kahurānaki and 17 other marae, creating 39 jobs.

== Education ==
Poukawa School is a co-educational state primary school, with a roll of 94 as of July 2026. The school was established in 1921.

== Railway station ==
Poukawa had a flag station, opened on 16 February 1876, as part of the Paki Paki to Te Aute section of the Palmerston North–Gisborne Line. By 1891 there were 3 trains a day in each direction, serving a shelter shed, platform, cart approach, loading bank and a short siding. In 1912 an automatic tablet exchanger was added. In 1929 a passing loop was added, which was moved north east, near to Te Mahanga Road, in 1958. In the 1931 earthquake the line near Te Mahanga Road was displaced by about 5 ft (1.5 m). In 1967 Te Mahunga Road crossing gained flashing lights and bells, which were added the next year to Station Road crossing as well. The station lost its passenger service on 3 August 1959 and closed on 1 August 1971.

=== Te Hauke platform ===
After an 1884 petition for a platform at Te Hauke, 2 mi 27 ch (3.8 km) south of Poukawa, described as a Native Settlement, a short platform was provided in 1886 and a shelter shed in 1906. Te Hauke closed to all traffic on 21 Nov 1958.

| | Former adjoining stations | |
| Te Aute; Line open, station closed 6.19 km (3.85 mi) | Palmerston North–Gisborne Line | Pakipaki; Line open, station closed 10.04 km (6.24 mi) |
