= Bridge Pa =

Settlement in Hawke's Bay Region, New Zealand

- Interactive map of Bridge Pa
- Coordinates: 39°38′59″S 176°45′22″E
- Country: New Zealand
- Region: Hawke's Bay
- Territorial authority: Hastings District
- Ward: Heretaunga General Ward; Kahurānaki General Ward; Takitimu Māori Ward
- Electorates: Tukituki; Ikaroa-Rāwhiti (Māori)

Government
  - Territorial Authority: Hastings District Council
  - Regional council: Hawke's Bay Regional Council
  - Mayor of Hastings: Wendy Schollum
  - Tukituki MP: Catherine Wedd
  - Ikaroa-Rāwhiti MP: Cushla Tangaere-Manuel

Area
  - Total: 8.05 km^{2} (3.11 sq mi)

Population (2023 Census)
  - Total: 729
  - Density: 90.6/km^{2} (235/sq mi)

Bridge Pa (sometimes spelled "Bridge Pā") is a rural Māori settlement and surrounding area in Hawke's Bay, New Zealand, located approximately 10 kilometres inland from Hastings. The pā itself comprises a school, a meetinghouse of the LDS Church, two marae (Korongata Marae and a later addition in 1984 of the Mangaroa Marae), a cemetery, a disused quarry, and the 140-year-old historical Homestead of the Kamau family.

Bridge Pa is situated on flat land on the Heretaunga Plains with the major geographical feature of the township being the Karewarewa Stream. Located on the edge of an unconfined aquifer, the surrounding land is free-draining and is used for sheep grazing, horticulture and wine production.

The surrounding area includes Hastings Aerodrome, two golf clubs, a car club, and a Deer Stalkers hall. As well as the main settlement centred on the intersection of Maraekakaho Road and Raukawa Road, a satellite settlement is located on Ngatarawa Road (near the Valentine Road corner) and on State Highway 50 (near the corner with Maraekakaho Road in the shadow of Roy's Hill). A relatively large tract of the surrounding rural area (up to 5 km from the pā) is also classified as "Bridge Pa" by local authorities and the White Pages.

The main road through the town is limited to 50 km/h and traffic is slowed through a variety of traffic calming measures. There is no sewerage. There is metropolitan style water reticulation. Wastewater is treated via individual homeowner septic tanks.

The rural setting experiences between −3 °C frosts in winter (usually clearing to clear crisp days) to 40 °C heat in late summer. Bridge Pa is approximately 20 km from the coast, and with the central North Island mountain ranges of the Ruahines and Kawekas to intercept the prevailing westerly winds, the region enjoys a Mediterranean climate with around 2350 sunshine hours per annum and very low humidity.

== Demographics ==
Bridge Pa settlement covers 8.05 km^{2} (3.11 sq mi). It is part of the larger Bridge Pa statistical area.

Historical population for Bridge Pa settlement
Year	Pop.	±% p.a.
2006	564	—
2013	516	−1.26%
2018	618	+3.67%
2023	729	+3.36%

Bridge Pa settlement had a population of 729 in the 2023 New Zealand census, an increase of 111 people (18.0%) since the 2018 census, and an increase of 213 people (41.3%) since the 2013 census. There were 363 males, 360 females, and 3 people of other genders in 180 dwellings. 0.8% of people identified as LGBTIQ+. There were 186 people (25.5%) aged under 15 years, 138 (18.9%) aged 15 to 29, 294 (40.3%) aged 30 to 64, and 108 (14.8%) aged 65 or older.

People could identify as more than one ethnicity. The results were 43.2% European (Pākehā); 67.5% Māori; 7.4% Pasifika; 1.2% Asian; 0.8% Middle Eastern, Latin American and African New Zealanders (MELAA); and 2.9% other, which includes people giving their ethnicity as "New Zealander". English was spoken by 95.5%, Māori by 20.2%, Samoan by 1.2%, and other languages by 3.7%. No language could be spoken by 2.1% (e.g. too young to talk). The percentage of people born overseas was 9.9, compared with 28.8% nationally.

Religious affiliations were 46.9% Christian, 2.9% Māori religious beliefs, 0.4% Buddhist, and 0.4% other religions. People who answered that they had no religion were 45.3%, and 4.1% of people did not answer the census question.

Of those at least 15 years old, 69 (12.7%) people had a bachelor's or higher degree, 312 (57.5%) had a post-high school certificate or diploma, and 141 (26.0%) people exclusively held high school qualifications. 27 people (5.0%) earned over $100,000 compared to 12.1% nationally. The employment status of those at least 15 was 282 (51.9%) full-time, 69 (12.7%) part-time, and 30 (5.5%) unemployed.

=== Bridge Pa statistical area ===
Bridge Pa statistical area covers 23.24 km^{2} (8.97 sq mi) and had an estimated population of 1,380 as of June 2025, with a population density of 59 people per km^{2}. The area includes Hawke's Bay Regional Prison which houses approximately 640 inmates.

Historical population for the statistical area
Year	Pop.	±% p.a.
2006	1,023	—
2013	1,083	+0.82%
2018	1,140	+1.03%
2023	1,374	+3.80%

The statistical area had a population of 1,374 in the 2023 New Zealand census, an increase of 234 people (20.5%) since the 2018 census, and an increase of 291 people (26.9%) since the 2013 census. There were 888 males, 486 females, and 3 people of other genders in 261 dwellings. 1.5% of people identified as LGBTIQ+. The median age was 35.9 years (compared with 38.1 years nationally). There were 219 people (15.9%) aged under 15 years, 300 (21.8%) aged 15 to 29, 684 (49.8%) aged 30 to 64, and 171 (12.4%) aged 65 or older.

People could identify as more than one ethnicity. The results were 45.9% European (Pākehā); 60.7% Māori; 7.9% Pasifika; 5.2% Asian; 0.2% Middle Eastern, Latin American and African New Zealanders (MELAA); and 2.0% other, which includes people giving their ethnicity as "New Zealander". English was spoken by 96.3%, Māori by 17.5%, Samoan by 1.3%, and other languages by 6.8%. No language could be spoken by 1.3% (e.g. too young to talk). New Zealand Sign Language was known by 0.7%. The percentage of people born overseas was 14.0, compared with 28.8% nationally.

Religious affiliations were 38.9% Christian, 0.2% Hindu, 0.7% Islam, 5.2% Māori religious beliefs, 0.4% Buddhist, and 1.7% other religions. People who answered that they had no religion were 49.8%, and 3.9% of people did not answer the census question.

Of those at least 15 years old, 129 (11.2%) people had a bachelor's or higher degree, 687 (59.5%) had a post-high school certificate or diploma, and 342 (29.6%) people exclusively held high school qualifications. The median income was $23,800, compared with $41,500 nationally. 57 people (4.9%) earned over $100,000 compared to 12.1% nationally. The employment status of those at least 15 was 450 (39.0%) full-time, 135 (11.7%) part-time, and 51 (4.4%) unemployed.

== Bridge Pa Triangle ==
Bridge Pa Triangle is a grape growing area roughly delineated by three roads: Ngatarawa Road, State Highway 50 and Maraekakaho Road. It is recognised as a premium wine growing area in the Hawke's Bay wine region. Wines grown include Merlot, Syrah, Chardonnay and Sauvignon blanc. In ancient times the area was blanketed by the pumice tephra of numerous Lake Taupō volcanic events. Much of the Triangle area covers the historical (pre-1860s earthquake) riverbed of the nearby Ngaruroro River. As such soil types include Ngatarawa Gravels, Takapau Silty-loam (free draining red metal of mixed alluvial and volcanic origin) and shallow clay-loam soils with underlying deep free draining pumice.

Alwyn Corban and Garry Glazebrook of Ngatarawa Wines pioneered wine production in the area in the 1980s and it is only with the growth of other boutique wineries in the late 1990s the "Bridge Pa Triangle" has been delineated and named. The area is also sometimes described as The Maraekakaho Triangle and The Ngatarawa Triangle. Bordering Ngatarawa Road and to the north of the area along State Highway 50 is the Gimblett Gravels wine growing area.

== Marae ==
Bridge Pa has two marae. Korongatā Marae and Nukanoa meeting house is a meeting place of the Ngāti Kahungunu hapū of Ngāti Pōporo and Ngāti Whatuiāpiti. Mangaroa Marae and Hikawera II meeting house is a meeting place of the Ngāti Kahungunu hapū of Ngāti Pōporo and Ngāti Rahunga.

In October 2020, the Government committed $6,020,910 from the Provincial Growth Fund to upgrade a group of 18 marae, including both Korongatā and Mangaroa. The funding was expected to create 39 jobs.

== Education ==
Bridge Pa School is a co-educational Year 1-8 state primary school, with a roll of 107 as of July 2026. It opened in 1967.

The Māori Agricultural College was a school run by The Church of Jesus Christ of Latter-day Saints in Bridge Pa from 1913 until the 1931 earthquake.

== Notable people ==
- Tori Reid - New Zealand rugby union player
- Charlene Otene - Tall Fern, Silver Fern
- Kevin Tamati - Kiwi Rugby League
- Jack Maere - Tall Black
- Caroline Evers-Swindell - Olympic rowing gold medalist
- Georgina Evers-Swindell - Olympic rowing gold medalist, indoor rower
- Peter Lyons - New Zealand Gliding champion
- Taine Randell - All Black
