= Pukehou =

Pukehou Pukehouhou
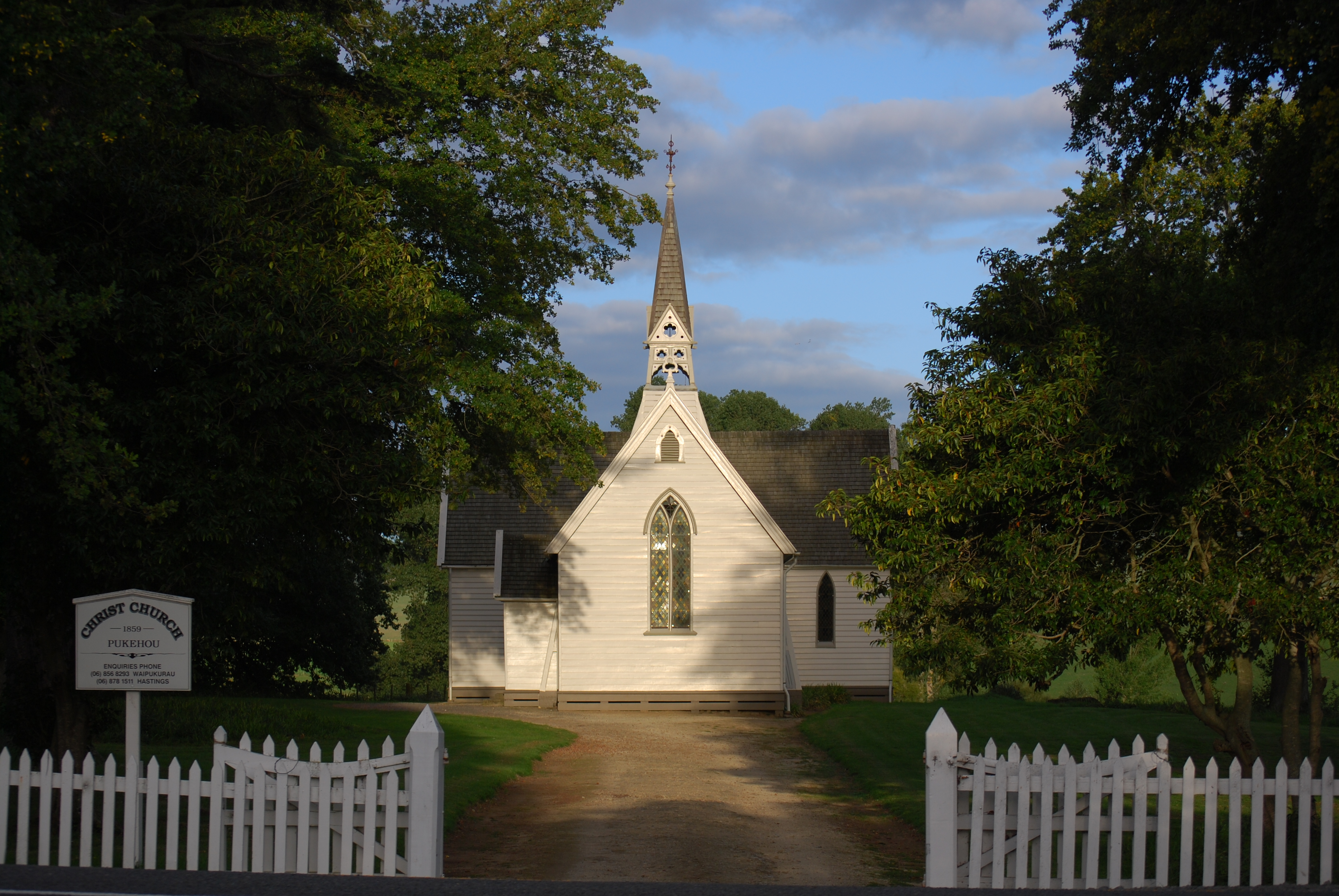
- Christ Church, the oldest church in Hawke's Bay
- Interactive map of Pukehou
- Coordinates: 39°50′S 176°38′E
- Country: New Zealand
- Region: Hawke's Bay
- Territorial authority: Central Hawke's Bay District, Hastings District
- Ward: Aramoana-Ruahine
- Electorates: Tukituki; Ikaroa-Rāwhiti (Māori)

Government
  - Territorial Authority: Central Hawke's Bay District Council
  - Regional council: Hawke's Bay Regional Council
  - Mayor of Central Hawke's Bay: Will Foley
  - Tukituki MP: Catherine Wedd
  - Ikaroa-Rāwhiti MP: Cushla Tangaere-Manuel

Area
  - Total: 126.74 km^{2} (48.93 sq mi)

Population (2023 Census)
  - Total: 351
  - Density: 2.77/km^{2} (7.17/sq mi)

Pukehou is a farming locality in southern Hawke's Bay, in the eastern North Island of New Zealand.

Pukehou is located on State Highway 2, about halfway between Hastings and Waipukurau. The locality's name (originally Pukehouhou) is Māori, and means "Hill of houhou", the 'houhou' or 'Puahou' being a small native flowering tree, Pseudopanax arboreus or Five Finger (Māori: 'Puahou' or 'Whauwhaupaku').

Christ Church, the oldest church in Hawke's Bay and the Waiapu Diocese, was built by Samuel Williams in 1859. It was constructed of local timber with roofing of hand split totara shingles and measured 40 feet by 20 feet. It was extended in both 1881 and 1893, work in the latter date including the north and south transept and chancel. It church was repaired in 1959 with the roof being repiled, repainted and reshingled, and was repainted in 1993.

The church has two significant stained glass windows. The east window was designed by John Bonnor while Karl Parsons designed the north one. The church is registered as a Category I heritage building by Heritage New Zealand.

== Demographics ==
Pukehou locality covers 126.74 km^{2} (48.93 sq mi). The locality is split between the Mangaonuku and the Mangarara statistical areas.

Historical population
Year	Pop.	±% p.a.
2013	357	—
2018	375	+0.99%
2023	351	−1.31%

Pukehou had a population of 351 in the 2023 New Zealand census, a decrease of 24 people (−6.4%) since the 2018 census, and a decrease of 6 people (−1.7%) since the 2013 census. There were 186 males and 165 females in 135 dwellings. 0.9% of people identified as LGBTIQ+. There were 81 people (23.1%) aged under 15 years, 57 (16.2%) aged 15 to 29, 153 (43.6%) aged 30 to 64, and 63 (17.9%) aged 65 or older.

People could identify as more than one ethnicity. The results were 80.3% European (Pākehā); 35.0% Māori; 5.1% Pasifika; 0.9% Asian; and 3.4% Middle Eastern, Latin American and African New Zealanders (MELAA). English was spoken by 97.4%, Māori by 12.8%, and other languages by 3.4%. No language could be spoken by 1.7% (e.g. too young to talk). New Zealand Sign Language was known by 0.9%. The percentage of people born overseas was 12.8, compared with 28.8% nationally.

Religious affiliations were 35.9% Christian, 2.6% Māori religious beliefs, and 0.9% New Age. People who answered that they had no religion were 53.0%, and 8.5% of people did not answer the census question.

Of those at least 15 years old, 54 (20.0%) people had a bachelor's or higher degree, 144 (53.3%) had a post-high school certificate or diploma, and 69 (25.6%) people exclusively held high school qualifications. 21 people (7.8%) earned over $100,000 compared to 12.1% nationally. The employment status of those at least 15 was 147 (54.4%) full-time, 45 (16.7%) part-time, and 6 (2.2%) unemployed.

== Marae ==
Pukehou Marae and Keke Haunga meeting house is a meeting place of Ngāti Kekehaunga, Ngāti Pukututu and Ngāti Whatuiāpiti, of Ngāti Kahungunu.

In October 2020, the Government committed $6,020,910 from the Provincial Growth Fund to upgrade a group of 18 marae, including Pukehou Marae. The funding was expected to create 39 jobs.

== Education ==
Pukehou School is a Year 1–8 co-educational state primary school. It had a roll of 35 as of July 2026. The school opened in 1920, and new buildings opened in 1952.

Te Aute College is a Year 9–15 boys' single-sex, state integrated secondary school. It had a roll of 77 as of July 2026. It opened in 1854 as Ahuriri Native Industrial School. Three new brick buildings were constructed in the 1920s.

== Railway station ==
Pukehou had a flag station on the Palmerston North–Gisborne Line. It opened on Monday 28 August 1876, when the railway was extended from Te Aute to Waipawa as part of the Paki Paki to Waipukurau contract, which international contractors, Brogdens, were building. By 1883 there were 3 trains a day in each direction, serving a shelter shed, platform and a short siding. Stockyards were added in 1889 and, in 1912, an automatic tablet exchanger. On 8 December 1912 the name was changed to Te Aute, but Pukehou reverted to its original name on 14 September 1913. The station closed to all traffic on 31 January 1966.

On Sunday 12 November 1995 the Wellington to Napier Bay Express derailed at Pukehou, due to taking a 50 km/h (31 mph) curve at 89 km/h (55 mph). One person died the following day.

	Former adjoining stations	
Ōtāne; Line open, station closed 7.1 km (4.4 mi)	Palmerston North–Gisborne Line	Te Aute; Line open, station closed 7.09 km (4.41 mi)x
