= Waiohiki =

- Locality
- Interactive map of Waiohiki
- Coordinates: 39°33′45″S 176°49′00″E
- Country: New Zealand
- Region: Hawkes Bay
- District: Hastings District
- Ward: Heretaunga General Ward; Takitimu Māori Ward
- Electorates: Napier; Ikaroa-Rāwhiti (Māori)

Government
  - Territorial authority: Hastings District Council
  - Regional council: Hawke's Bay Regional Council
  - Mayor of Hastings: Wendy Schollum
  - Napier MP: Katie Nimon
  - Ikaroa-Rāwhiti MP: Cushla Tangaere-Manuel

Area
  - Total: 8.27 km^{2} (3.19 sq mi)

Population (2023 Census)
  - Total: 381
  - Density: 46.1/km^{2} (119/sq mi)

Waiohiki is a rural community in the Hastings District and Hawke's Bay Region of New Zealand's North Island. It is located between the Ngaruroro and Tūtaekurī Rivers, south of Taradale and north of Hastings on State Highway 50. Napier Golf Club is at Waiohiki.

== History and culture ==
Ormlie Lodge on Omarunui Road was built by William Nelson in 1899 as a wedding present to his daughter Gertrude and son-in-law Hector Smith. The 1931 earthquake damaged the house extensively, forcing the Smiths to move out for two years while it was repaired at the cost of £1764 (GB pounds). Gertrude and Hector, who had four daughters, lived their entire married life on the estate. Gertrude died in 1955; Hector remained in the villa another seven years until he sold it in 1962, just before his death at the age of 93. The new owners turned the home into a private hotel, and the stables were converted into what was one of Hawke's Bay's finest restaurants in the 1960s. For the next twenty years the gracious homestead went through a number of changes and owners. In 1985 fire destroyed the Stables Restaurant. The homestead itself was not touched by the blaze. The restaurant was never rebuilt. Soon after the fire, new owners bought the lodge, renovated it to its former glory, and engaged the services of the son of the original builder to construct the elegant ballroom, which is now a venue for weddings, conferences and other functions.

Waiohiki Marae is a meeting place of Ngāti Pārau, a hapū of Ngāti Kahungunu. In October 2020, the Government committed $375,000 from the Provincial Growth Fund to upgrade the marae, creating 35 jobs.

Parts of Waiohiki were inundated by flooding during Cyclone Gabrielle in 2023 after the Ngaruroro River burst its banks. Dozen of houses were destroyed. One person died after being swept away by floodwater at Waiohiki.

== Demographics ==
Waiohiki covers 8.27 km^{2} (3.19 sq mi). It is part of Omahu-Pakowhai statistical area.

Historical population
Year	Pop.	±% p.a.
2013	348	—
2018	462	+5.83%
2023	381	−3.78%

Waiohiki had a population of 381 in the 2023 New Zealand census, a decrease of 81 people (−17.5%) since the 2018 census, and an increase of 33 people (9.5%) since the 2013 census. There were 186 males and 192 females in 93 dwellings. 0.8% of people identified as LGBTIQ+. There were 48 people (12.6%) aged under 15 years, 54 (14.2%) aged 15 to 29, 186 (48.8%) aged 30 to 64, and 90 (23.6%) aged 65 or older.

People could identify as more than one ethnicity. The results were 72.4% European (Pākehā); 39.4% Māori; 6.3% Pasifika; 1.6% Asian; 0.8% Middle Eastern, Latin American and African New Zealanders (MELAA); and 1.6% other, which includes people giving their ethnicity as "New Zealander". English was spoken by 97.6%, Māori by 14.2%, Samoan by 3.1%, and other languages by 3.9%. No language could be spoken by 0.8% (e.g. too young to talk). New Zealand Sign Language was known by 0.8%. The percentage of people born overseas was 11.0, compared with 28.8% nationally.

Religious affiliations were 37.8% Christian, 9.4% Māori religious beliefs, 0.8% New Age, and 0.8% other religions. People who answered that they had no religion were 44.1%, and 3.9% of people did not answer the census question.

Of those at least 15 years old, 81 (24.3%) people had a bachelor's or higher degree, 189 (56.8%) had a post-high school certificate or diploma, and 66 (19.8%) people exclusively held high school qualifications. 45 people (13.5%) earned over $100,000 compared to 12.1% nationally. The employment status of those at least 15 was 162 (48.6%) full-time, 36 (10.8%) part-time, and 18 (5.4%) unemployed.
