= Hine-i-paketia =

Hine-i-paketia, also known as Ani, (fl. 1850–1870) was a New Zealand Māori tribal leader. She identified with the Ngāti Kahungunu and Ngāti Te Whatuiāpiti iwi. A high-ranking Māori woman, she was referred to as 'the Queen' by early European visitors to Hawke's Bay. She was a prolific seller of Māori lands.
