= Ngāti Te Whatuiāpiti =

Māori hapū (sub-tribe) in Aotearoa (New Zealand)

- Iwi (tribe) in Māoridom
- Rohe (region): Hawke's Bay
- Waka (canoe): Tākitimu
- Website: www.kahungunu.iwi.nz

Ngāti Te Whatuiāpiti, Ngāti Te Whatu-i-āpiti or Ngāi Te Whatuiāpiti is a Māori hapū (subtribe or branch) of the Ngāti Kahungunu iwi in Hawke's Bay, New Zealand.

The hapū were descended from Te Whatuiāpiti, who was a great-grandson of Taewhā, himself a son of Rākei-hikuroa, the grandson of Kahungunu, and his second wife. Ngāi Whatuiāpiti had a fierce rivalry with Ngāi Te Upokoiri, which was descended from Taraia, a son of Rākei-hikuroa and his first wife.

== Marae and wharenui ==
=== Central Hawke's Bay District ===
The hapū is associated with three marae (meeting grounds) and wharenui (meeting houses) in Central Hawke's Bay District:

- Mataweka marae and Nohomaiterangi wharenui on Tapairu Road at Waipawa
- Pukehou marae and Keke Haunga wharenui on State Highway 2 at Pukehou
- Te Whatuiāpiti marae and Te Whatuiāpiti wharenui on Te Aute Trust Road in the Pātangata area and north-east of Ōtāne

=== Hastings District ===
The hapū is associated with two marae (meeting grounds) and wharenui (meeting houses) in Hastings District:

- Kahurānaki marae and wharenui on State Highway 2 at Te Hauke
- Korongatā marae and Nukanoa wharenui on Maraekakaho Road at Bridge Pa

== Notable people ==
- Hine-i-paketia, a tribal leader and land seller
- Te Hapuku, a tribal leader, farmer and assessor
- Te Pareihe, a tribal leader
- Hori Tupaea, a tribal leader and farmer
