= Hastings Aerodrome =

- IATA: none; ICAO: NZHS

Summary
- Operator: Hawke's Bay and East Coast Aero Club Inc
- Location: Hastings, New Zealand
- Elevation AMSL: 72 ft (22 m)
- Coordinates: 39°38′48.12″S 176°46′0.84″E

Map
- Location within New Zealand

Runways
| Direction | Length | | Surface |
| Direction | ft | m | Surface |
|---|---|---|---|
| 01L/19R | 3,527 | 1,075 | Asphalt |
| 11/29 | 2,900 | 884 | Grass |
| 01R/19L | 2,887 | 880 | Grass |
- Sources: WorldAeroData

Hastings Aerodrome (ICAO: NZHS) is a small airport in Hastings, Hawke's Bay, New Zealand. It is sometimes referred to as Bridge Pa Aerodrome. It is owned and operated by the Hawke's Bay & East Coast Aero Club Inc.

The airport is on the Heretaunga Plains. The settlement of Bridge Pa is close by. The aerodrome is eight kilometres west of the Hastings central business district.

Scheduled airline services in and out of Hawke's Bay are generally handled at the larger nearby Hawke's Bay Airport in Napier.

== History ==
The Hawke's Bay & East Coast Aero Club was New Zealand's second aero club, being incorporated on 12 November 1928. On 3 August 1932 the Hawke's Bay & East Coast Aero Club purchased an 80-acre block of land next to the Hastings Golf course for a new aerodrome, and on 20 January 1933 the Aero Club opened a new club house, which still exists on site as the old club house, several hundred metres away from the current modern club house.

New Zealand Aerial Mapping Ltd purchased its first plane in 1936 - a Monospar ST25. NZ Aerial Mapping has been based at Hastings Aerodrome ever since, and it is New Zealand's oldest aviation company. The company headquarters are in the Hastings CBD.

In 1939 when World War II broke out, pilot training stepped up to provision trained pilots for the Air Force. Hawke's Bay received an initial quota of 12 trainees, which was supplemented with an extra five pilots every eight weeks. The Hawke's Bay & East Coast Aero Club linked with the Air Training Corps and in line with a national move agreed to give the Government its planes in the event of war. With the outbreak of war the Hawke's Bay & East Coast Aero Club effectively went into hibernation. By March 1940, 32 of the clubs trainees had joined the RNZAF, the RAAF or the RAF.

The operations of the Hawke's Bay & East Coast Aero Club resumed in January 1946 with the end of the war.

In 1968 the Hawke's Bay Skydiving Club was born based at the Hastings Aerodrome, and in that same year the Hawke's Bay Gliding Club built its hangar base at Hastings Aerodrome. In 1976 full runway strip lighting was installed for the main runway. Two years later in 1978 the main runway was sealed when New Zealand Aerial Mapping sealed a 1000-metre landing strip to accommodate its new and larger aircraft.

== Operational data ==
Hastings Aerodrome is an uncontrolled airport. It has three runways. 01L/19R is sealed and is 1075 metres in length. 01R/19L is a parallel grass runway to the sealed runway and is 880 metres in length, which is often referred to as the 'grass runway 01' or 'grass runway 19'. There is also a cross runway, 11/29 which is 884 metres in length. This runway is sealed for 295 metres on the 29 threshold until it meets the main sealed runway, and then the rest of the runway is grass.

== Activity ==
Hastings Aerodrome is busy and is used by a diverse range of operators. In addition to the Hawke's Bay & East Coast Aero Club, other organisations based at Hastings Aerodrome include a Microlight Club, Gliding Club, Skydiver Club, two Helicopter Operators, two aerial Agricultural Operators, Hawke's Bay Avionics Ltd aircraft avionics and engineers, New Zealand Aerial Mapping Ltd, and an Aircraft Servicing and Sales Business. There are many privately owned aircraft at Hastings Aerodrome along with a group of amateur aircraft builders.

Air Hawke's Bay, a wholly owned subsidiary of the Hawke's Bay & East Coast Aero Club, is a registered aviation college and air charter company that specialises in full-time integrated fixed wing pilot training for both domestic and international students, and air charter services. It was the first New Zealand air academy to be accredited with CAA Part 141 and is also approved for Air Transport Operations conducted under CAA Part 135 certification. Air Hawke's Bay has NZQA accreditation and the academy is also a Signatory to the Code of Practice for International Students. The academy is one of five Air New Zealand FTO partners, offering greater outcomes in the airline industry for its graduates. The academy trains forty percent of its pilots from overseas.
