= Omahu =

- Village
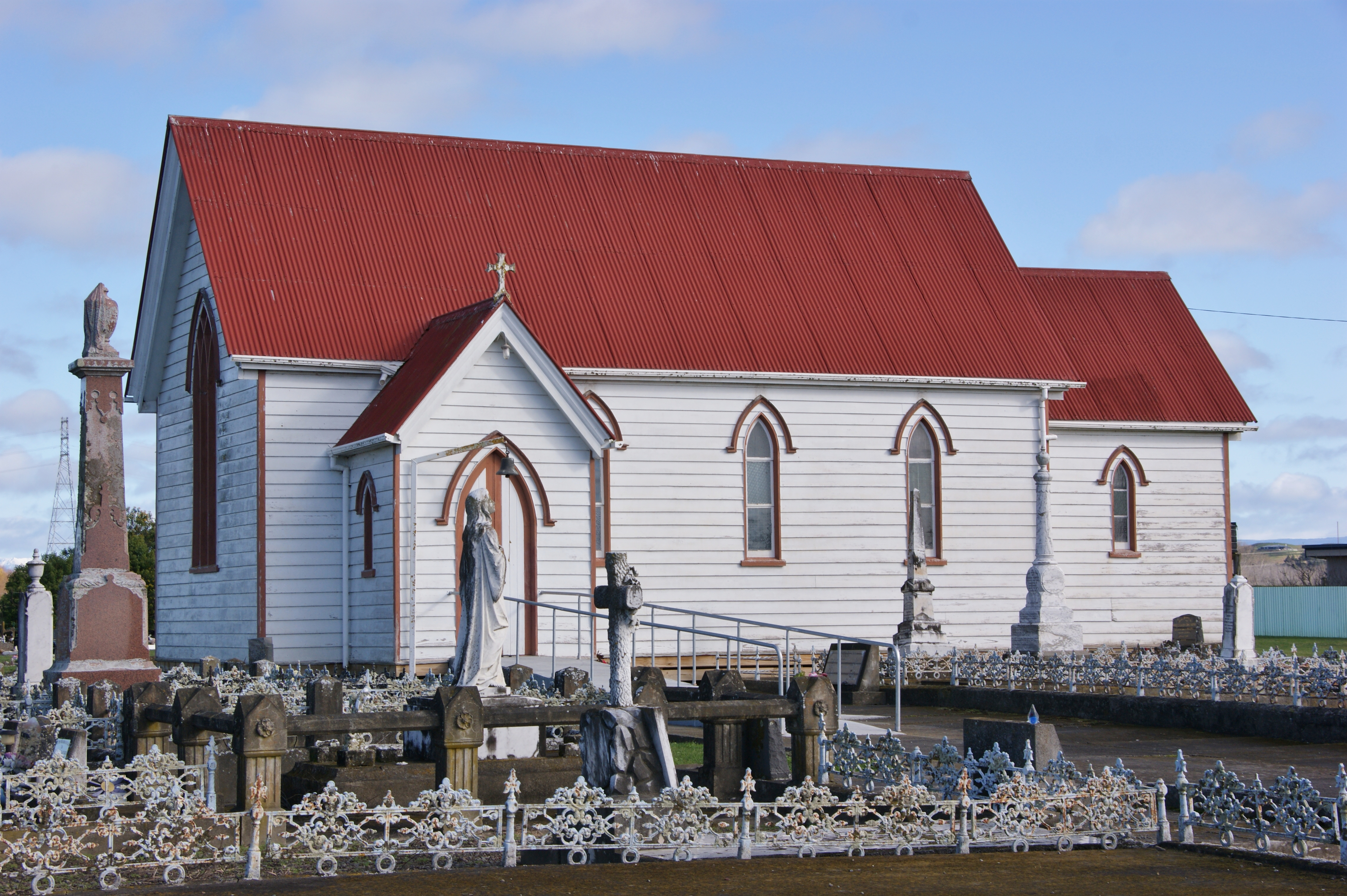
- Church of St John
- Interactive map of Omahu
- Country: New Zealand
- Region: Hawkes Bay
- District: Hastings District
- Ward: Heretaunga General Ward; Takitimu Māori Ward
- Iwi: Ngāi Te Upokoiri, Ngāti Hinemanu, Ngāti Rangikamangungu, Ngati Hinepare, Ngati Honomokai, Ngati Hawea
- Established: 1850
- Founder: Rēnata Kawepō
- Electorates: Napier; Ikaroa-Rāwhiti (Māori)

Government
  - Type: Hapū Confederacy
  - Territorial Authority: Hastings District Council
  - Regional council: Hawke's Bay Regional Council
  - Mayor of Hastings: Wendy Schollum
  - Napier MP: Katie Nimon
  - Ikaroa-Rāwhiti MP: Cushla Tangaere-Manuel

Area
  - Total: 11.54 km^{2} (4.46 sq mi)

Population (2023 Census)
  - Total: 147
  - Density: 12.7/km^{2} (33.0/sq mi)

Omahu is a village in the Hastings District and Hawke's Bay Region of New Zealand's North Island. It is located on State Highway 50, north-west of Hastings on the north bank of the Ngaruroro River.

Omahu (Māori: Ōmahu) was a significant Māori tribal capital and strategic settlement established by the prominent Ngāti Te Upokoiri rangatira (chief) Renata Kawepo. Located in the fertile Heretaunga plains of Hawke's Bay, New Zealand, Omahu served as a major political, economic, and cultural centre for Kawepo's hapū (sub-tribe) and a broader confederation of iwi (tribes) under his influence during the mid to late 19th century. Its establishment reflected Kawepo's vision for a self-sufficient and politically independent Māori stronghold in the face of increasing European settlement and land pressures.

A missionary site was established at Omahu in the early 19th century.

Omahu was inundated by flooding during Cyclone Gabrielle in 2023 after the Ngaruroro River burst its banks, destroying dozens of houses.

== Etymology ==
The name "Omahu" is Māori. It is derived from the ancient ancestor Mahutapoanui, a significant figure in Māori whakapapa (genealogy) and oral traditions. The name relates to a journey Mahutapoanui made through the Heretaunga region, with local tradition noting that the current Omahu Marae takes its name from a river crossing made by Mahutapoanui and his dog near the site. While often broadly understood as "Ō" (place of) and "mahu" (to recover, to heal, or to be gentle/mild), in this specific context, the name carries a direct ancestral connection to Mahutapoanui. The New Zealand Ministry for Culture and Heritage gives a translation of "the place where Mahu ran out of food" for Ōmahu.

== Demographics ==
Omahu covers 11.54 km^{2} (4.46 sq mi). It is part of Omahu-Pakowhai statistical area.

Historical population
Year	Pop.	±% p.a.
2013	255	—
2018	372	+7.85%
2023	402	+1.56%

Omahu had a population of 402 in the 2023 New Zealand census, an increase of 30 people (8.1%) since the 2018 census, and an increase of 147 people (57.6%) since the 2013 census. There were 228 males and 174 females in 66 dwellings. 1.5% of people identified as LGBTIQ+. There were 72 people (17.9%) aged under 15 years, 78 (19.4%) aged 15 to 29, 195 (48.5%) aged 30 to 64, and 54 (13.4%) aged 65 or older.

People could identify as more than one ethnicity. The results were 52.2% European (Pākehā); 61.9% Māori; 3.7% Pasifika; and 1.5% Middle Eastern, Latin American and African New Zealanders (MELAA). English was spoken by 96.3%, Māori by 22.4%, Samoan by 0.7%, and other languages by 3.7%. No language could be spoken by 1.5% (e.g. too young to talk). New Zealand Sign Language was known by 0.7%. The percentage of people born overseas was 6.7, compared with 28.8% nationally.

Religious affiliations were 36.6% Christian, 0.7% Islam, 5.2% Māori religious beliefs, 0.7% New Age, and 0.7% other religions. People who answered that they had no religion were 51.5%, and 4.5% of people did not answer the census question.

Of those at least 15 years old, 42 (12.7%) people had a bachelor's or higher degree, 198 (60.0%) had a post-high school certificate or diploma, and 90 (27.3%) people exclusively held high school qualifications. 21 people (6.4%) earned over $100,000 compared to 12.1% nationally. The employment status of those at least 15 was 177 (53.6%) full-time, 42 (12.7%) part-time, and 18 (5.5%) unemployed.

== Marae ==
The area has two Ngāti Kahungunu marae. Omāhu Marae is a meeting place for Ngāi Te Ūpokoiri, Ngāti Hinemanu, Ngāti Honomōkai and Ngāti Mahuika; it includes the Kahukuranui meeting house. Te Āwhina Marae is a meeting place for Te Ūpokoiri, Ngāti Hinemanu, Ngāti Mahuika; its meeting house has been demolished.

In October 2020, the Government committed $6,020,910 from the Provincial Growth Fund to upgrade a group of 18 marae, including Omāhu Marae. The funding was expected to create 39 jobs.

== Education ==
Omahu School is a co-educational state primary school, with a roll of 54 as of July 2026. It opened in 1899 as Fernhill School, and has been called Omahu School since the 1950s. In February 2023 Cyclone Gabrielle destroyed most of the school, but enough was rebuilt for students to return in early 2024.
