= William Geddis (New Zealand politician) =

New Zealand politician

William John Geddis (1860 – 1 May 1926) was a member of the New Zealand Legislative Council from 7 May 1918 to 6 May 1925; then 7 May 1925 to 1 May 1926 when he died. He was appointed by the Reform Government.

He was from Napier. In 1912, he bought The New Zealand Times, a Wellington newspaper. He retired from The New Zealand Times in January 1925 because of ill-health.
