= Katie Nimon =

New Zealand politician

Katie Nimon MP
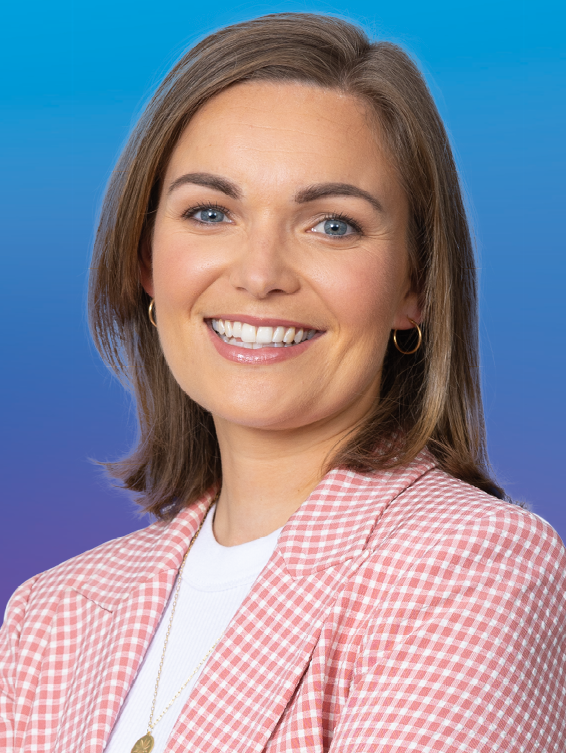
- Nimon in 2023

Member of the New Zealand Parliament for Napier
- Incumbent
- Assumed office 14 October 2023
- Preceded by: Stuart Nash

Personal details
- Born: 1989 or 1990 (age 36–37) Hawke's Bay, New Zealand
- Party: National
- Spouse: Jeremy Lawson (m. 2022)
- Relatives: William Geddis (great-grandfather)
- Education: Massey University

Katrina Margaret Nimon (born 1989 or 1990) is a New Zealand politician and Member of Parliament in the House of Representatives for the National Party.

== Early life and career ==
Nimon was born and raised in Hawke's Bay. She attended Iona College and subsequently Massey University, where she received a Bachelor of Design with honours and an Executive MBA. Two of Nimon's great-grandfathers, including William Geddis, served as members of the Legislative Council. She grew up in a Presbyterian family, whom she credited with instilling in her the value of "service to the core."

Nimon began working for her family's bus company, Nimon & Sons, when she was a teenager. After a stint working in advertising in Auckland, she returned to Nimon & Sons in 2015, first working as the marketing manager before later becoming the general manager. The company struggled during the COVID-19 pandemic, and in 2021 it lost a school bus contract to Tranzit Group, prompting Nimon to leave for a position as transport manager for the Hawke's Bay Regional Council. The company was soon bought out by Tranzit after 116 years of operation.

Nimon stepped down from her role as transport manager at the regional council in 2022 to focus on her second parliamentary campaign.

== Political career ==
New Zealand Parliament
Years	Term	Electorate	List	Party
2023–2026	54th	Napier	22	National
2026–present	55th	Napier	26	National

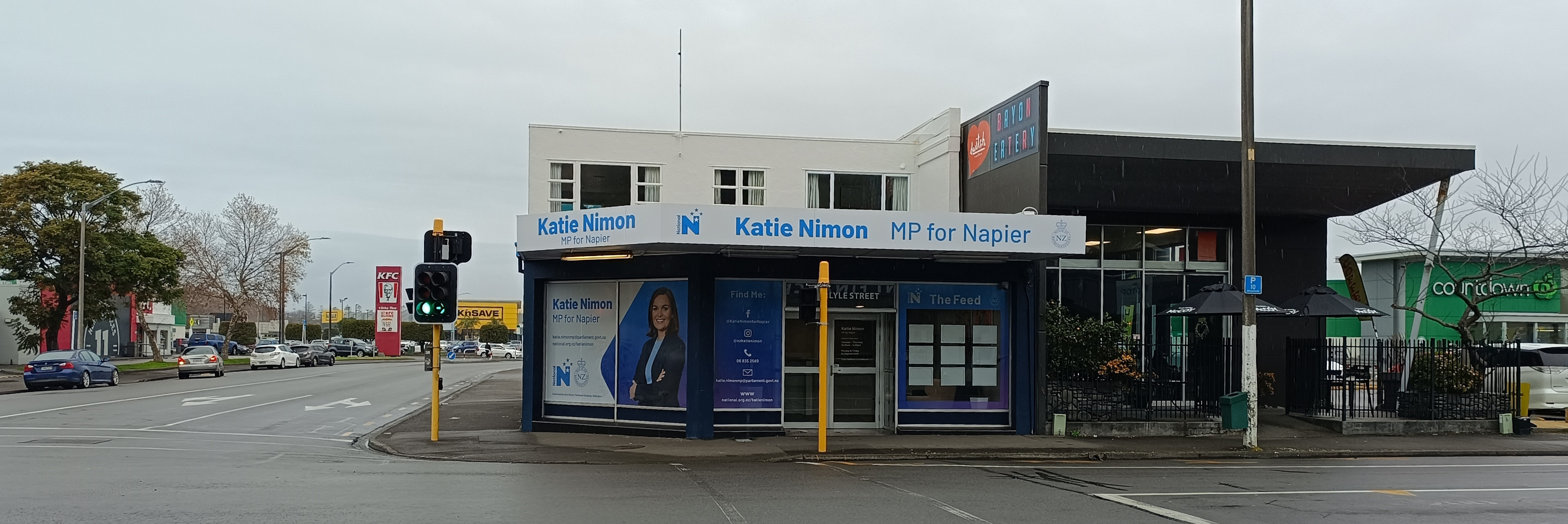
Nimon's electorate office in Napier

In May 2020, Nimon was selected as National's candidate for Napier in the 2020 election. She came second with 37.04%, and her list position of 45 was not high enough to be elected. After her defeat, she pledged to stand again.

On 20 November 2022, it was announced that Nimon would again contest Napier at the 2023 New Zealand general election. On election night on 14 October 2023, Nimon won the seat by a margin of 8,909 votes, flipping the seat back to National.

On 12 March 2025, Nimon objected to Labour Member of Parliament Camilla Belich's Crimes (Theft by Employer) Amendment Act 2025, which passed its third reading with the support of Labour, the Green, Te Pāti Māori and the New Zealand First parties. During the third reading, Nimon argued the bill was unnecessary because of the Employment Relations Act 2000 and claimed it would clog up the justice system.

During the 2026 New Zealand general election, Nimon contested the Napier electorate for National. She was ranked 26th on the National Party list. On 7 November, Nimon retained Napier by a margin of 6,847 votes based on preliminary results.

== Personal life ==
In December 2022, she married Jeremy Lawson. They had a baby boy three years later. Nimon is a self-described believer in astrology and is a Scorpio.

In mid-July 2026, Nimon attracted media attention after former Labour MP and New Zealand First candidate Stuart Nash made misogynistic remarks alleging she had taken nine months maternity leave after giving birth to her son. Nash had made this allegation in a text message to former National MP Chris Finlayson, who was hosting a podcast called "Cross Party Lines." In response, Nimon confirmed that she had only taken maternity leave for ten weeks before returning to Parliament after six months. She also said that she had "achieved more with National for Hawke's Bay in three years with a baby than he [Nash] has in nine years." Nash's remarks were criticised from across the New Zealand political spectrum including National Party leader Christopher Luxon, National MPs Chris Bishop, Nicola Willis, Nicola Grigg, ACT leader David Seymour, Labour leader Chris Hipkins, Labour MP Willow-Jean Prime, Greens co-leader Marama Davidson and Green MP Julie Anne Genter, who also expressed support for Nimon. Nash subsequently resigned as a NZ First candidate for the 2026 New Zealand general election, and apologised to Nimon for his misogynistic remarks.
