= Hastings District, New Zealand =

Hastings District
- Territorial authority district
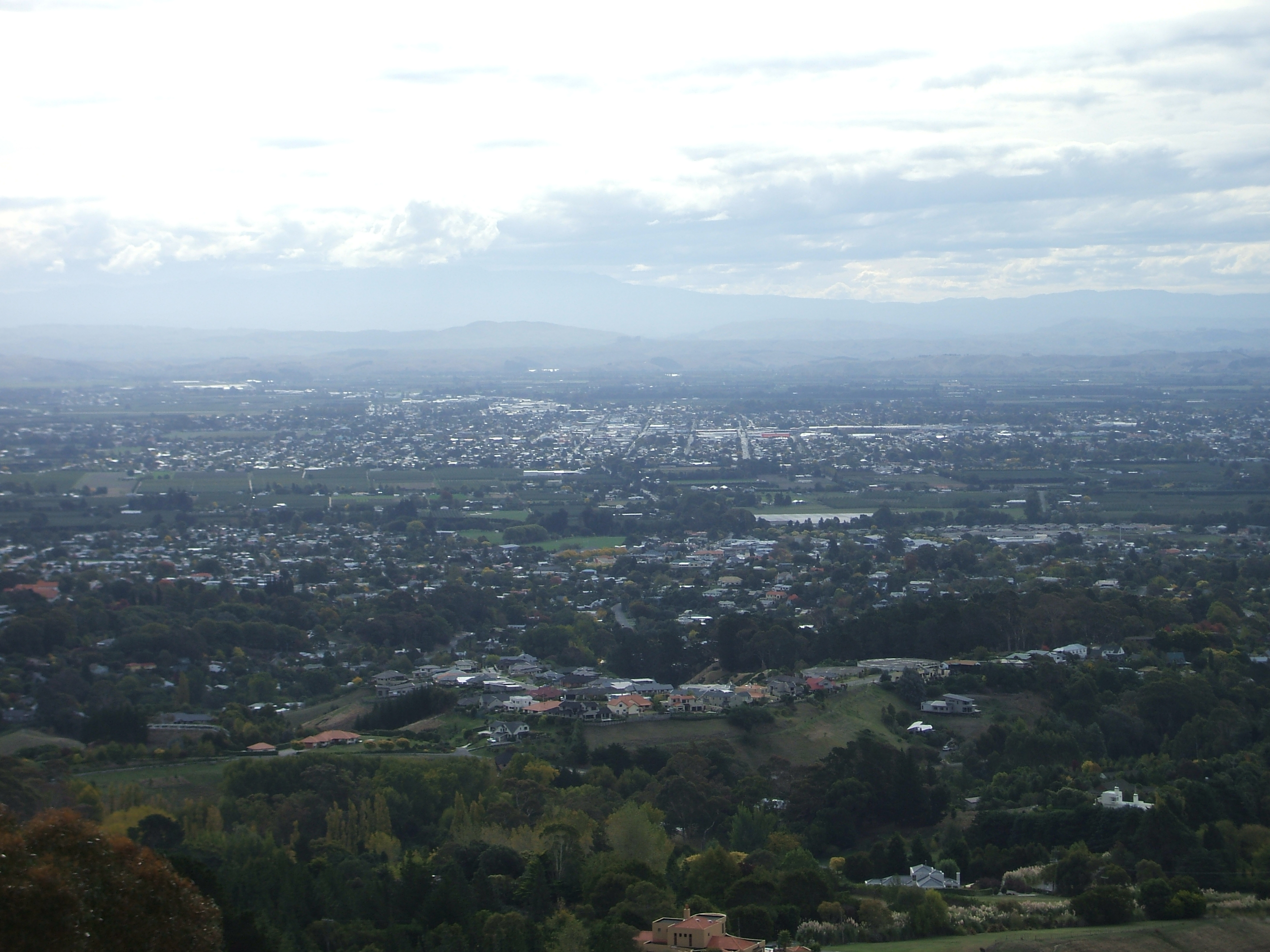

- Hastings district within the North Island
- Coordinates: 39°38′42″S 176°50′35″E
- Country: New Zealand
- Region: Hawke's Bay Region
- Wards: Mohaka; Heretaunga; Flaxmere; Kahuranaki; Hastings-Havelock North; Māori
- Seat: Hastings

Government
  - Mayor: Wendy Schollum
  - Deputy Mayor: Michael Fowler
  - Territorial authority: Hastings District Council

Area
  - Land: 5,226.71 km^{2} (2,018.04 sq mi)

Population (June 2025)
  - Total: 88,300
  - Density: 16.9/km^{2} (43.8/sq mi)
- Time zone: UTC+12 (NZST)
  - Summer (DST): UTC+13 (NZDT)
- Postcode(s): Map of postcodes
- Area code: 06
- Website: www.hastingsdc.govt.nz

Hastings District is a territorial authority district within the Hawke's Bay region, on the east coast of the North Island of New Zealand. It includes the southern half of the Hawke Bay coast, excluding Napier City, which is under a separate territorial authority. Hastings District Council is headquartered in the city of Hastings, the district's largest town.

The district has an area of 5,227 square kilometres. The population was 88,300 as of June 2025, which is 1.7% of the population of New Zealand, ranking it tenth in population size out of the seventy-four territorial authorities. This comprises 49,800 people in the Hastings urban area, 15,000 people in the Havelock North urban area, 2,040 people in the Clive urban area, and 21,460 people in rural areas and settlements.

Mayor Sandra Hazlehurst was elected in a by-election in 2017, and re-elected in the 2019 election.

== Council history ==
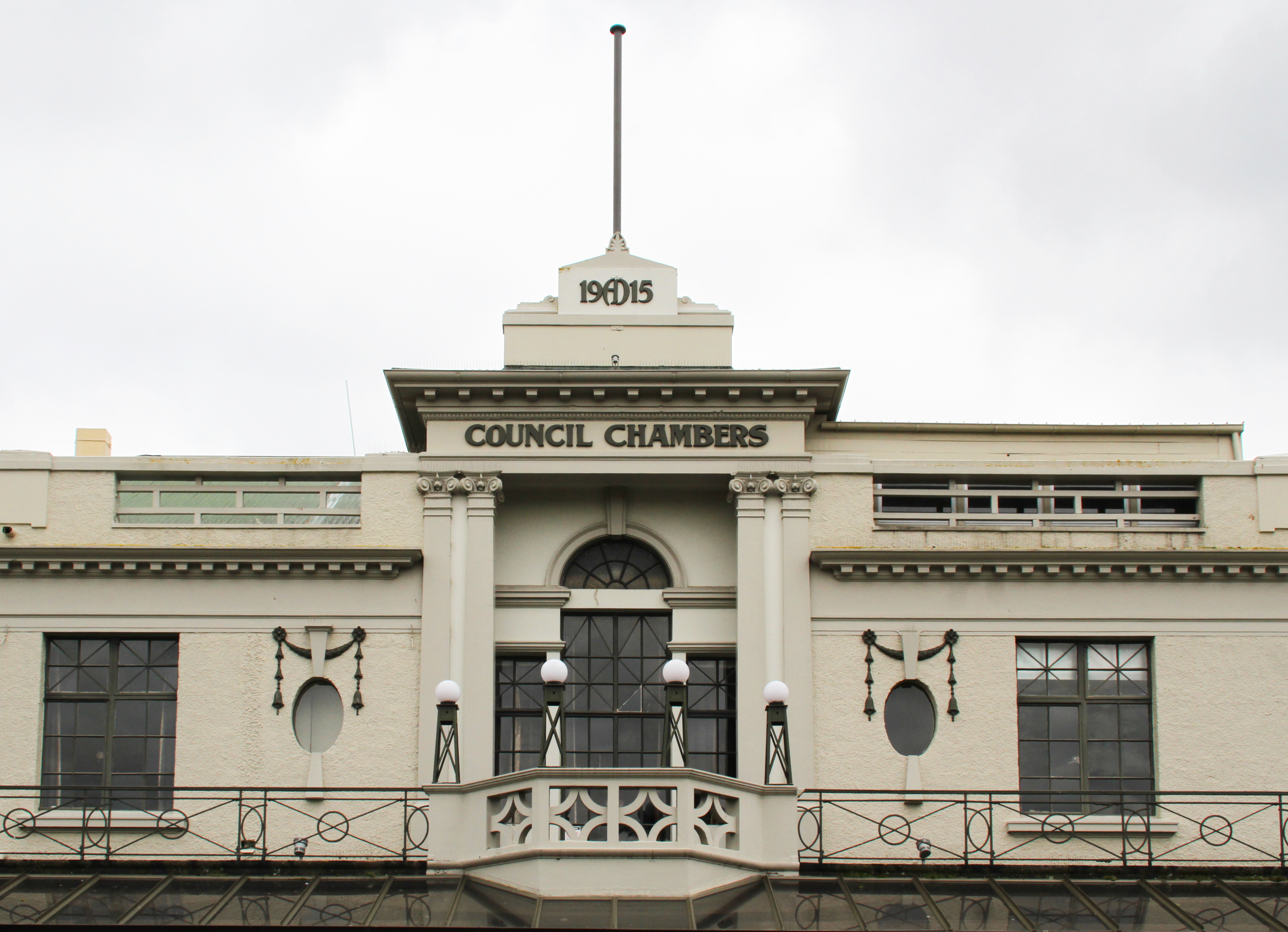
Former Hastings District Council building

Local government in the area began with the Havelock North Roads Board in 1871. It was replaced by a Town Board in 1912, and became Havelock North Borough Council in 1952. Hastings was a Town District in 1884. The Hastings Borough Council formed in 1886, and became Hastings City Council in 1956. Hawke's Bay County was established in 1876.

Hastings District was established from the merger of Havelock North Borough Council, Hastings City Council and the Hawke’s Bay County Council as part of the 1989 local government reforms.

== Demographics ==
Hastings District covers 5,226.71 km^{2} (2,018.04 sq mi) and had an estimated population of 88,300 as of June 2025, with a population density of 16.9 people per km^{2}.

Historical population
Year	Pop.	±% p.a.
1991	64,000	—
1996	66,300	+0.71%
2001	67,400	+0.33%
2006	70,842	+1.00%
2013	73,245	+0.48%
2018	81,537	+2.17%
2023	85,965	+1.06%

Hastings District had a population of 85,965 in the 2023 New Zealand census, an increase of 4,428 people (5.4%) since the 2018 census, and an increase of 12,720 people (17.4%) since the 2013 census. There were 42,231 males, 43,482 females and 252 people of other genders in 29,766 dwellings. 2.2% of people identified as LGBTIQ+. The median age was 38.9 years (compared with 38.1 years nationally). There were 17,541 people (20.4%) aged under 15 years, 15,396 (17.9%) aged 15 to 29, 37,716 (43.9%) aged 30 to 64, and 15,309 (17.8%) aged 65 or older.

People could identify as more than one ethnicity. The results were 69.9% European (Pākehā); 28.4% Māori; 8.5% Pasifika; 7.6% Asian; 0.8% Middle Eastern, Latin American and African New Zealanders (MELAA); and 2.3% other, which includes people giving their ethnicity as "New Zealander". English was spoken by 96.1%, Māori language by 7.4%, Samoan by 2.7% and other languages by 9.4%. No language could be spoken by 1.9% (e.g. too young to talk). New Zealand Sign Language was known by 0.6%. The percentage of people born overseas was 19.1, compared with 28.8% nationally.

Religious affiliations were 36.0% Christian, 1.2% Hindu, 0.5% Islam, 3.0% Māori religious beliefs, 0.6% Buddhist, 0.4% New Age, 0.1% Jewish, and 2.2% other religions. People who answered that they had no religion were 50.3%, and 6.1% of people did not answer the census question.

Of those at least 15 years old, 10,473 (15.3%) people had a bachelor's or higher degree, 36,753 (53.7%) had a post-high school certificate or diploma, and 17,967 (26.3%) people exclusively held high school qualifications. The median income was $40,500, compared with $41,500 nationally. 6,372 people (9.3%) earned over $100,000 compared to 12.1% nationally. The employment status of those at least 15 was that 34,896 (51.0%) people were employed full-time, 9,153 (13.4%) were part-time, and 1,878 (2.7%) were unemployed.

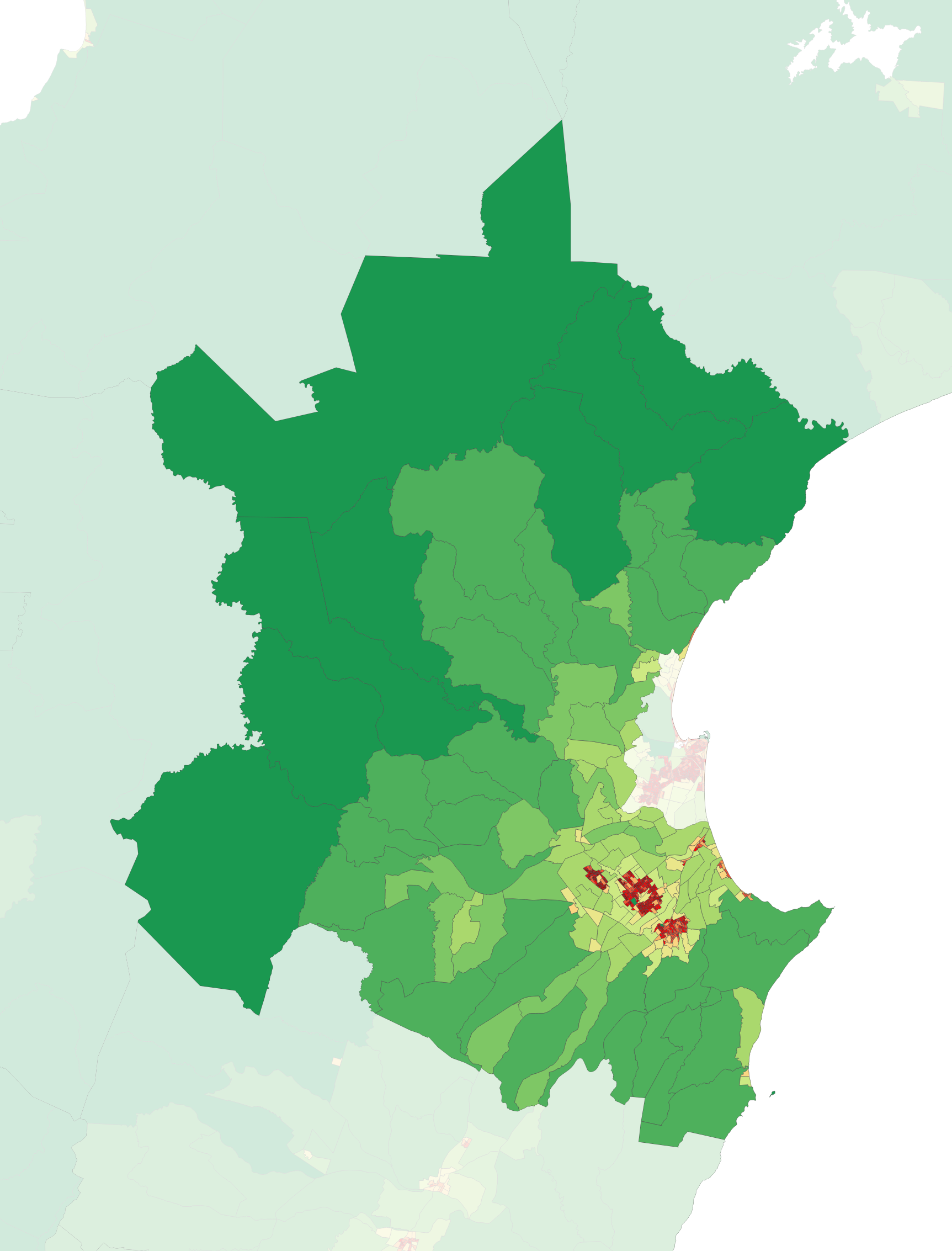
Population density in the 2023 census

Individual general wards
Name	Area (km^{2})	Population	Density (per km^{2})	Dwellings	Median age	Median income
Mohaka General Ward	3,443.62	6,042	1.8	1,989	44.6 years	$45,900
Heretaunga General Ward	214.52	12,165	56.7	3,927	43.7 years	$42,400
Hastings-Havelock North General Ward	27.69	49,743	1,796.4	18,708	39.5 years	$40,200
Flaxmere General Ward	3.93	11,460	2,916.0	2,988	28.7 years	$37,400
Kahurānaki General Ward	1,536.94	6,555	4.3	2,154	42.8 years	$41,700
New Zealand					38.1 years	$41,500

Below is a list of urban areas that contain more than 1,000 population.

Urban area	Population (June 2025)	% of region
Hastings	49,800	56.4%
Havelock North	15,000	17.0%
Clive	2,040	2.3%
Haumoana	1,210	1.5%

Other towns and settlements include (from north to south):

- Whirinaki
- Whakatu
- Te Awanga
- Maraekakaho
- Waimārama

== Economy ==
The district is one of the largest apple, pear and stonefruit producing areas in New Zealand and an important grape growing and wine production area. Napier is an important service centre for the agriculture and pastoral output of the predominantly rural Hastings District. Shopping is heavily weighted by large format retail in Hastings City, whereas in contrast, Havelock North, Taradale and central Napier retail areas have a more vibrant boutique flavour.

=== Tourism ===
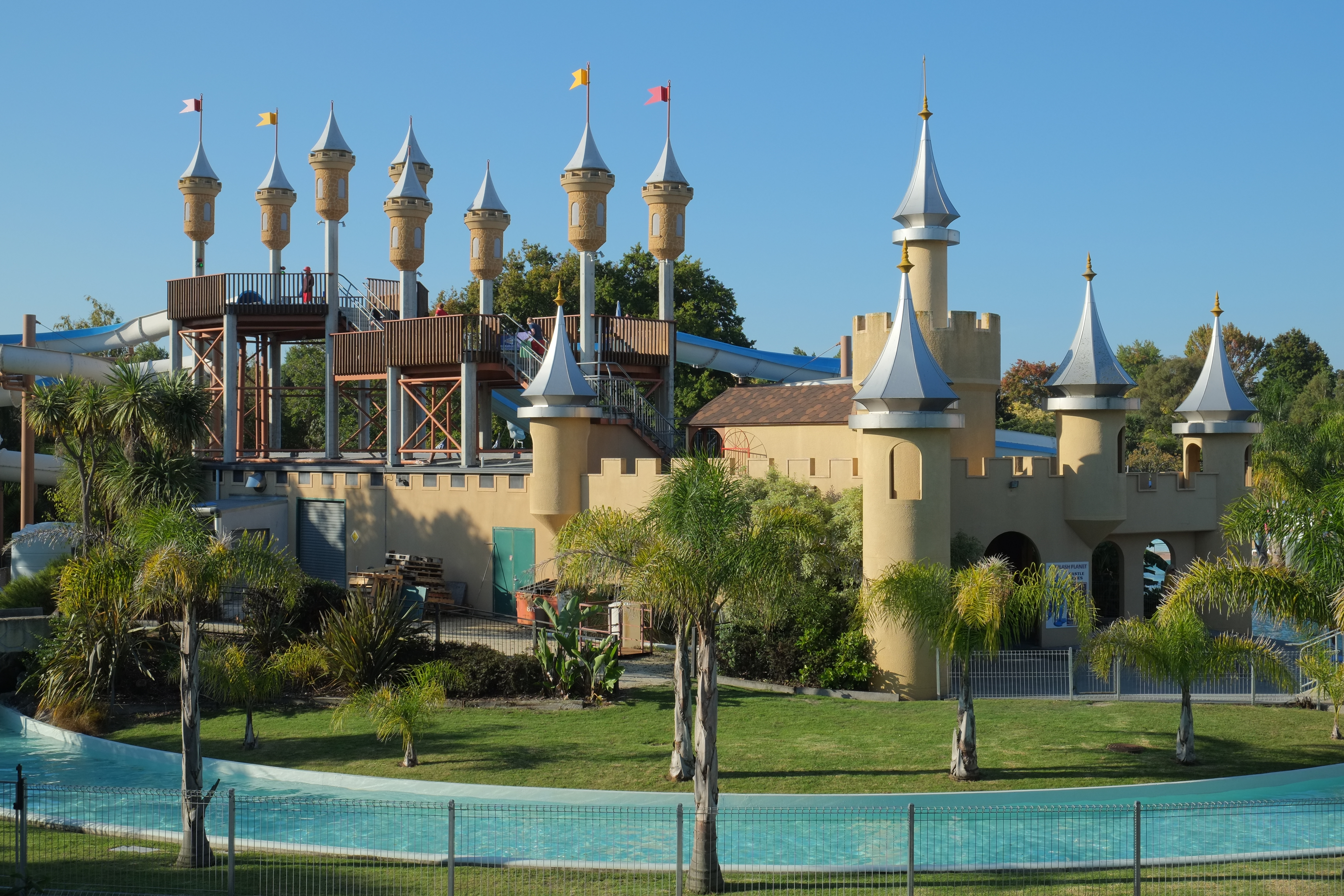
Sky Castle, Splash Planet, Hastings

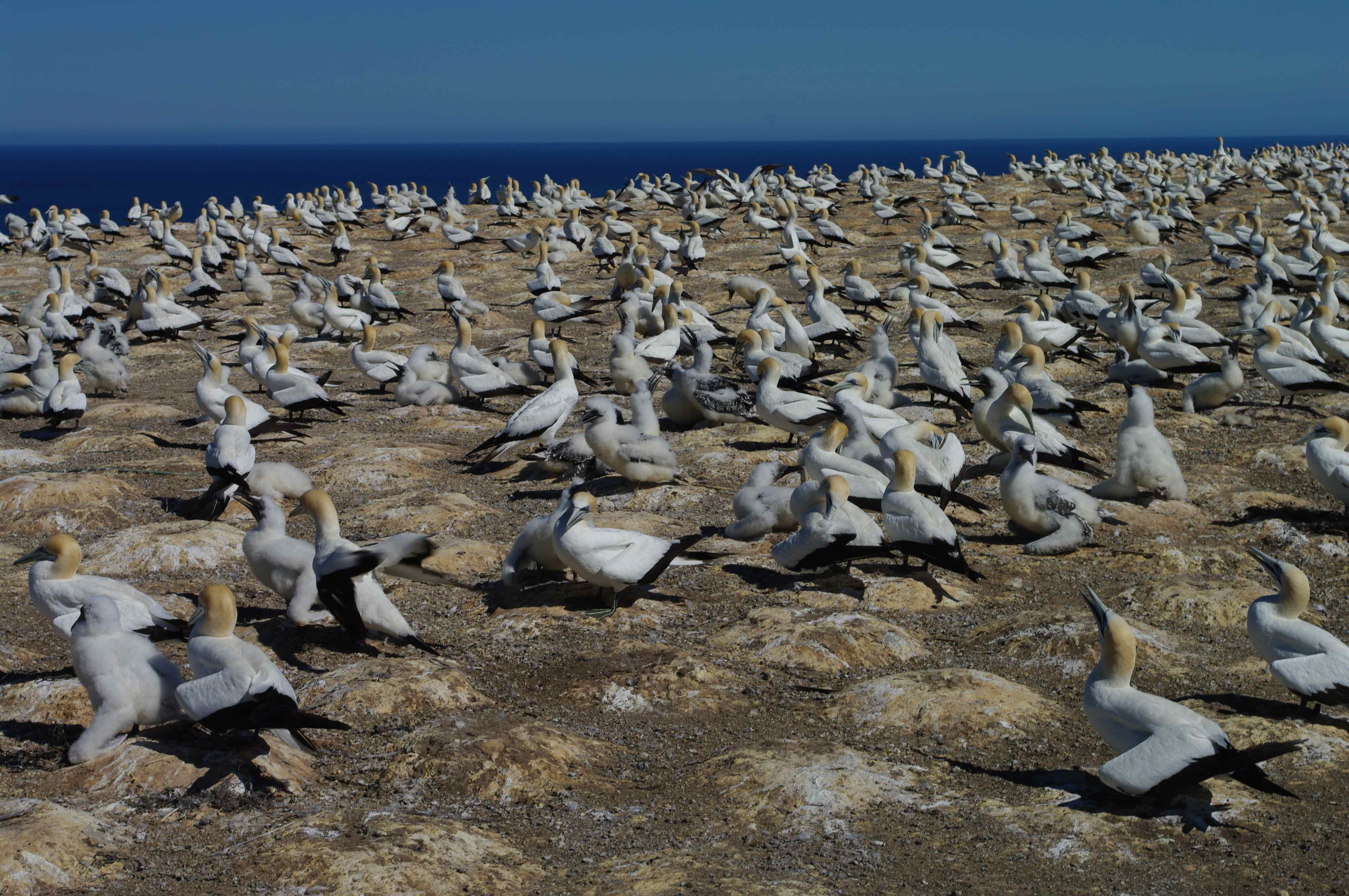
Gannet colony on Cape Kidnappers

Hastings District is historic and welcoming to tourists, although inbound tourism is typically focused on Napier. Hastings features a tourism industry based on 'lifestyle' activities rather than attractions. The majority of tourists are domestic, usually from other regions within New Zealand. Scheduled airline services to Hawke's Bay operate through Hawke's Bay Airport, and the nearby Hastings Aerodrome is available for private planes. Tourism in Hawke's Bay is growing at an extremely rapid rate. In the recent decade, Hawke's Bay Airport's annual passenger numbers have grown from a 2005 count of 297,000 to a count of 476,000 in the year ending 30 June 2015. In the next five years, passenger numbers are expected to exceed 550,000, bringing many new people into Hawke's Bay, with Hastings benefiting from the greater tourism.

Hastings' largest drawcard is the wine and food trail established around the productive hinterland. There are over 75 wineries in the surrounding area, including New Zealand's oldest winery restaurant (Vidal Estate). Boutique food industries are becoming popular with cheese, fine meats, and locally produced delicacies seen on display at the Hawkes Bay Farmer's Market (New Zealand's oldest and largest weekly farmer's market). Outdoor leisure activities dominate, with beaches, rivers, mountain biking, tramping, and golf being popular. In summer, many large-scale events attract domestic tourists, including the Spring Racing Carnival, the Blossom Parade, Harvest Hawkes Bay Weekend, and various concerts and events. The Blossom Festival was once a large national event in the mid-20th century, with charter trains from Wellington and Auckland coming for the event. This, however, has slowly declined in popularity.

Hastings' specialist attractions include New Zealand's largest water park, called 'Splash Planet', which replaced 'Fantasyland' near the turn of the millennium, Cape Kidnappers (the world's largest mainland gannet colony), and Te Mata Peak.

== Education ==
Hastings, Flaxmere and Havelock North have secondary schools, and Hastings and Havelock North also have intermediate schools. Some secondary schools in Hastings and Havelock North are single-sex, but there are also co-educational secondary schools in those areas. Te Kura Kaupapa Māori o Te Wananga Whare Tapere o Takitimu is a Māori language immersion school in the Parkvale suburb of Hastings.

== Sister cities ==
Hastings has had a sister city relationship with Guilin in China since 1981. it signed a second agreement with Poutasi in Samoa in May 2023.

- 1977 – Guilin, Guangxi, China
- 2023 - Poutasi, Samoa
