= List of schools in the Hawke's Bay =

Hawke's Bay is a region in the North Island of New Zealand. It contains numerous small rural primary schools, some small town primary and secondary schools, and city schools in the Napier-Hastings area.

In New Zealand schools, students begin formal education in Year 1 at the age of five. Year 13 is the final year of secondary education. Years 14 and 15 refer to adult education facilities. State schools are those fully funded by the government and at which no fees for tuition of domestic students (i.e. New Zealand citizens and permanent residents, and Australian citizens) can be charged, although a donation is commonly requested. A state integrated school is a former private school with a special character based on a religious or philosophical belief that has been integrated into the state system. State integrated schools charge "attendance dues" to cover the building and maintenance of school buildings, which are not owned by the government, but otherwise they like state schools cannot charge fees for tuition of domestic students but may request a donation. Private schools charge fees to its students for tuition, as do state and state integrated schools for tuition of international students.

The roll of each school changes frequently as students start school for the first time, move between schools, and graduate. The rolls given here are those provided by the Ministry of Education are based on figures from November 2012. The Ministry of Education institution number links to the Education Counts page for each school.

== Wairoa District ==
Name	Years	Gender	Area	Authority	Roll	Website	MOE	ERO
Frasertown School	1–6	Coed	Frasertown	State	112	-	2562	2562
Kotemaori School	1–8	Coed	Kotemaori	State	18	-	2587	2587
Mohaka School	1–8	Coed	Mohaka	State	49	-	1677	1677
Nuhaka School	1–8	Coed	Nūhaka	State	104		2624	2624
Ohuka School	1–8	Coed	Ohuka	State	11	-	2625	2625
Putere School	1–8	Coed	Putere	State	9	-	2657	2657
Ruakituri School	1–8	Coed	Ruakituri	State	10	-	1675	1675
St Joseph's School	1–8	Coed	Wairoa	State integrated	93	-	2679	2679
Te Kura o Waikaremoana	1–8	Coed	Tuai	State	24	-	1678	1678
Te Mahia School	1–8	Coed	Māhia	State	68	-	1676	1676
Tiaho Primary School	1–6	Coed	Wairoa	State	56	-	1669	1669
TKKM o Ngati Kahungunu o Te Wairoa	1–8	Coed	Wairoa	State	180	-	1616	1616
Wairoa College	7–15	Coed	Wairoa	State	402		214	214
Wairoa Primary School	1–6	Coed	Wairoa	State	290	-	1668	1668

== Hastings District ==
Name	Years	Gender	Area	Authority	Roll	Website	MOE	ERO
Bridge Pa School	1–8	Coed	Bridge Pa	State	100	-	2547	2547
Camberley School	1–6	Coed	Camberley	State	91	-	2548	2548
Clive School	1–6	Coed	Clive	State	210		2549	2549
Ebbett Park School	1–6	Coed	Raureka	State	127	-	2554	2554
Eskdale School	1–8	Coed	Eskdale	State	279	-	2557	2557
Flaxmere College	7–13	Coed	Flaxmere	State	362		134	134
Flaxmere Primary School	1–8	Coed	Flaxmere	State	417		2560	2560
Frimley School	1–6	Coed	Frimley	State	503		2563	2563
Hastings Boys' High School	9–13	Boys	Akina	State	795		227	227
Hastings Central School	1–6	Coed	Hastings Central	State	199		2569	2569
Hastings Christian School	1–13	Coed	Akina	State integrated	326		443	443
Hastings Girls' High School	9–13	Girls	Frimley	State	566		228	228
Hastings Intermediate	7–8	Coed	Akina	State	377		2570	2570
Haumoana School	1–6	Coed	Haumoana	State	162	-	2571	2571
Havelock North High School	9–13	Coed	Havelock North	State	1117	-	223	223
Havelock North Intermediate	7–8	Coed	Havelock North	State	553	-	2572	2572
Havelock North Primary School	1–6	Coed	Havelock North	State	559	-	2573	2573
Heretaunga Intermediate	7–8	Coed	Camberley	State	282	-	2575	2575
Hereworth School	1–8	Boys	Havelock North	Private	309	-	4108	4108
Hukarere Girls' College	9–13	Girls	Eskdale	State integrated	57		435	435
Iona College	7–13	Girls	Havelock North	State integrated	330	-	224	224
Irongate School	1–8	Coed	Flaxmere	State	208	-	2582	2582
Karamu High School	9–13	Coed	Parkvale	State	875		229	229
Kererū School	1–8	Coed	Maraekakaho	State	26	-	2585	2585
Kimi Ora Community School	1–8	Coed	Flaxmere	State	142	-	2746	2746
Kowhai School	–	Coed	Hastings Central	State	133	-	2588	2588
Lindisfarne College	7–13	Boys	Frimley	State integrated	560	-	230	230
Lucknow School	1–6	Coed	Havelock North	State	274	-	2590	2590
Mahora School	1–6	Coed	Mahora	State	355		2592	2592
Mangateretere School	1–8	Coed	Whakatu	State	40	-	2599	2599
Maraekakaho School	1–8	Coed	Maraekakaho	State	124	-	566	566
Mayfair School	1–6	Coed	Mayfair	State	217		2612	2612
Omahu School	1–8	Coed	Omahu	State	58	-	2626	2626
Pakowhai School	1–6	Coed	Pakowhai	State	36	-	2638	2638
Parkvale School	1–6	Coed	Parkvale	State	478	-	2641	2641
Patoka School	1–8	Coed	Patoka	State	39	-	2642	2642
Poukawa School	1–8	Coed	Poukawa	State	101	-	2650	2650
Pukehamoamoa School	1–8	Coed	Sherenden	State	66		2651	2651
Puketapu School	1–8	Coed	Puketapu	State	245	-	2654	2654
Putorino School	1–8	Coed	Putorino	State	15		2658	2658
Raureka School	1–6	Coed	Raureka	State	269	-	2662	2662
Sherenden and Districts School	1–8	Coed	Sherenden	State	54	-	2672	2672
St John's College	9–13	Boys	Mayfair	State integrated	416		226	226
St Joseph's School	1–8	Coed	Hastings Central	State integrated	286		2677	2677
St Mary's School	1–8	Coed	Mahora	State integrated	280		2681	2681
St Matthew's Primary School	1–8	Coed	Hastings Central	State integrated	157		1608	1608
Taikura Rudolf Steiner School	1–13	Coed	Hastings Central	State integrated	296		231	231
Te Mata School	1–6	Coed	Havelock North	State	516		2697	2697
Te Pohue School	1–8	Coed	Te Pohue	State	18	-	2698	2698
TKKM o Te Wananga Whare Tapere o Takitimu	1–8	Coed	Parkvale	State	266	-	1674	1674
TKKM o Ngati Kahungunu Ki Heretaunga	1–13	Coed	Flaxmere	State	242	-	2445	2445
Te Kura o Pakipaki	1–8	Coed	Pakipaki	State	38	-	2637	2637
Te Whai Hiringa	1–8	Coed	Flaxmere	State	459	-	2644	2644
Tutira School	1–8	Coed	Tutira	State	21		2710	2710
Twyford School	1–8	Coed	Twyford	Stat	165		2711	2711
Waimārama School	1–6	Coed	Waimārama	State	23		2718	2718
Woodford House	7–13	Girls	Havelock North	State integrated	379		225	225

== Napier City ==
Name	Years	Gender	Area	Authority	Roll	Website	MOE	ERO
Arthur Miller School	1–6	Coed	Taradale	State	297		2543	2543
Bledisloe School	1–6	Coed	Taradale	State	297	-	2546	2546
Fairhaven School	–	Coed	Taradale	State	91	-	2558	2558
Greenmeadows School	1–6	Coed	Greenmeadows	State	492		2567	2567
Hawke's Bay School for Teenage Parents	–	–	Onekawa	State	0	–	2747	2747
Henry Hill School	1–6	Coed	Onekawa	State	283		2574	2574
Hohepa School	1–13	Coed	Poraiti	Private	30		4109	4109
Maraenui Bilingual School	1–8	Coed	Maraenui	State	144	-	2604	2604
Marewa School	1–6	Coed	Marewa	State	218	-	2606	2606
Meeanee School	1–8	Coed	Meeanee	State	102	-	2613	2613
Napier Boys' High School	9–13	Boys	Te Awa	State	1283		216	216
Napier Central School	1–6	Coed	Hospital Hill	State	248		2618	2618
Napier Girls' High School	9–13	Girls	Bluff Hill	State	1049		217	217
Napier Intermediate	7–8	Coed	Napier South	State	381	-	2619	2619
Nelson Park School	1–6	Coed	Napier South	State	345		2620	2620
Onekawa School	1–6	Coed	Onekawa	State	344	-	2628	2628
Parkside Christian Seventh-day Adventist School	1–8	Coed	Greenmeadows	State integrated	61	-	4107	4107
Porritt School	1–6	Coed	Tamatea	State	327		2647	2647
Port Ahuriri School	1–6	Coed	Ahuriri	State	223		2648	2648
Reignier Catholic School	1–6	Coed	Greenmeadows	State integrated	185		2663	2663
Richmond School	1–6	Coed	Maraenui	State	50	-	2665	2665
Sacred Heart College	9–13	Girls	Bluff Hill	State integrated	336		219	219
St Joseph's Māori Girls' College	7–13	Girls	Taradale	State integrated	166		222	222
St Patrick's School	1–8	Coed	Onekawa	State integrated	264		2745	2745
Tamatea High School	9–13	Coed	Tamatea	State	388		218	218
Tamatea Intermediate	7–8	Coed	Tamatea	State	437	-	2685	2685
Tamatea School	1–6	Coed	Tamatea	State	142	-	2686	2686
Taradale High School	9–13	Coed	Taradale	State	966		215	215
Taradale Intermediate	7–8	Coed	Taradale	State	512		2687	2687
Taradale School	1–6	Coed	Taradale	State	410		2688	2688
Te Awa School	1–6	Coed	Te Awa	State	183	-	2691	2691
TKKM o Te Ara Hou	1–13	Coed	Onekawa	State	236	-	3107	3107
Westshore School	1–6	Coed	Westshore	State	84		2733	2733
William Colenso College	7–13	Coed	Onekawa	State	380		220	220

== Central Hawke's Bay District ==
Name	Years	Gender	Area	Authority	Roll	Website	MOE	ERO
Argyll East School	1–8	Coed	Ōtāne	State	72	-	2542	2542
Central Hawke's Bay College	9–15	Coed	Waipukurau	State	540		233	233
Elsthorpe School	1–8	Coed	Elsthorpe	State	44	-	2556	2556
Flemington School	1–8	Coed	Flemington	State	85	-	2561	2561
Omakere School	1–8	Coed	Omakere	State	77	-	2627	2627
Ongaonga School	1–8	Coed	Ongaonga	State	41	-	2629	2629
Otane School	1–8	Coed	Ōtāne	State	93	-	2634	2634
Porangahau School	1–8	Coed	Pōrangahau	State	44		730	730
Pukehou School	1–8	Coed	Pukehou	State	44		2652	2652
Sherwood School	1–8	Coed	Ashley Clinton	State	33		2673	2673
St Joseph's School	1–8	Coed	Waipukurau	State integrated	121	-	2678	2678
Takapau School	1–8	Coed	Takapau	State	125		2684	2684
Te Aute College	9–15	Boys	Pukehou	State integrated	77	-	232	232
The Terrace School	1–8	Coed	Waipukurau	State	144		2702	2702
Tikokino School	1–8	Coed	Tikokino	State	78		2704	2704
TKKM o Takapau	1–8	Coed	Takapau	State	36	-	1142	1142
Waipawa School	1–8	Coed	Waipawa	State	318		2723	2723
Waipukurau School	1–8	Coed	Waipukurau	State	318		2725	2725
