= Ashley Clinton =

Village in New Zealand

- Locality
- Interactive map of Ashley Clinton
- Coordinates: 39.948°S 176.257°E
- Country: New Zealand
- Region: Hawke's Bay
- Territorial authority: Central Hawke's Bay District
- Ward: Aramoana-Ruahine
- Electorates: Tukituki; Ikaroa-Rāwhiti (Māori)

Government
  - Territorial Authority: Central Hawke's Bay District Council
  - Regional council: Hawke's Bay Regional Council
  - Mayor of Central Hawke's Bay: Will Foley
  - Tukituki MP: Catherine Wedd
  - Ikaroa-Rāwhiti MP: Cushla Tangaere-Manuel

Area
  - Total: 93.00 km^{2} (35.91 sq mi)

Population (2023 Census)
  - Total: 186
  - Density: 2.00/km^{2} (5.18/sq mi)

Ashley Clinton (Māori: Makeretu) is a rural community in the Central Hawke's Bay District and Hawke's Bay Region of New Zealand's North Island.

Ashley Clinton is located between Norsewood and Ongaonga, some 18 kilometres west of Waipukurau. It is an almost triangular block bounded to the west by the Ruahine Forest Park, the Tukituki River to the north, and the Makaretu River to the south. It is centred on the intersection of State Highway 50 and Ashcott Road. The area consists of sheep, dairy and mixed use farms.

== Origin and history ==
=== Settler period ===
The Ashley Clinton area was acquired by the Government from the local Maori in the 1850s and consists of part of the Ruahine, Ruataniwha and Makaretu Blocks.

Ashley Clinton's name was most likely derived from Ashley Clinton Estate, Hampshire, England. A primary school, Ashley Clinton School, was established in the main village in 1876 but has since closed. Its school hall was the centre for community functions, meetings, and gathering.

In 1883 a Post Office was opened in Ashley Clinton. The Government named it Makeritu, which caused confusion with mail being occasionally misdirected. Makaretu, another small settlement nearby was seeking its own Post Office at this time but was declined as it was thought that they already had one due to the name similarity. The issue was raised with the Government, with both Makaretu and Ashley Clinton asking that the Post Office's name be changed to Ashley Clinton. The Post Office was renamed in January 1885. There was a store run by a Mr Loye at Ashley Clinton in 1883.

=== Fires, bush fires, and a fired teacher ===
In 1886 the school teacher, Charles Morton's, house was burnt down. The house also contained the community library which was also destroyed. The house and library were replaced in 1887. That same year horse racing (hurdles) was held at Ashley Clinton. The great Norsewood fire of 1888 destroyed two houses. Another bush fire passed by Ashley Clinton in 1895 but caused no damage to infrastructure there. Another severe fire passed through the area in February 1896 destroying a number of settlers' homes along with the school house and a number of bridges in the surrounding district. These continued to plague the area with bush fires being reported as late as 1938.

Later in 1896 the school headmaster was initially involved in an altercation with one of the school committee members, and was given notice by the Education Board. This brought about a court case appealing the decision — the first such appeal under the then new Public-School Teachers Incorporation and Court of Appeal Act 1895.

=== Development ===
A telephone service was installed in 1891. In 1893 the W Morton and Co sawmill was upgraded and offered more employment in the area. The mill, renamed as James Smith and Co. sawmill in 1895, was closed on 31 March 1896.

Some time prior to 1893 a hall, Durham Hall, was constructed in Ashley Clinton and used for various gatherings. Through this time a coach service ran from Ashley Clinton to Takapau. By 1895 a butcher and a blacksmith had taken up residence in the immediate area, and a rugby club was formed. Rabbits had become a significant pest in the area with the Ashley Clinton Rabbit Association being formed in 1896 with the aim of eradicating them.

=== Since 1900 ===
By the early 1900s Ashley Clinton had a miniature rifle club and a lawn tennis club. This was later followed by a Ladies Institute.

In 1912 the former store and post office were replaced.

In 1921 a glass war memorial was installed at Ashley Clinton Memorial dedicated to the five local men killed in World War I.

In 1971 drilling was carried out by Beaver Exploration (New Zealand) Limited at Ashley Clinton, Takapau, and Ongaonga. Small pockets of natural gas were found.

In 2013, residents of Black Road launched a campaign to have the road sealed.

== Demographics ==
Ashley Clinton locality covers 93.00 km^{2} (35.91 sq mi). The locality is part of the Makaretu statistical area.

Historical population
Year	Pop.	±% p.a.
2006	186	—
2013	180	−0.47%
2018	192	+1.30%
2023	186	−0.63%

Ashley Clinton had a population of 186 in the 2023 New Zealand census, a decrease of 6 people (−3.1%) since the 2018 census, and an increase of 6 people (3.3%) since the 2013 census. There were 111 males and 75 females in 66 dwellings. 1.6% of people identified as LGBTIQ+. The median age was 40.1 years (compared with 38.1 years nationally). There were 33 people (17.7%) aged under 15 years, 30 (16.1%) aged 15 to 29, 99 (53.2%) aged 30 to 64, and 21 (11.3%) aged 65 or older.

People could identify as more than one ethnicity. The results were 91.9% European (Pākehā), 4.8% Māori, and 6.5% Asian. English was spoken by 95.2%, and other languages by 8.1%. No language could be spoken by 1.6% (e.g. too young to talk). The percentage of people born overseas was 19.4, compared with 28.8% nationally.

Religious affiliations were 29.0% Christian, 1.6% Hindu, 1.6% Buddhist, and 1.6% other religions. People who answered that they had no religion were 48.4%, and 16.1% of people did not answer the census question.

Of those at least 15 years old, 33 (21.6%) people had a bachelor's or higher degree, 84 (54.9%) had a post-high school certificate or diploma, and 33 (21.6%) people exclusively held high school qualifications. The median income was $45,800, compared with $41,500 nationally. 18 people (11.8%) earned over $100,000 compared to 12.1% nationally. The employment status of those at least 15 was 90 (58.8%) full-time, 24 (15.7%) part-time, and 3 (2.0%) unemployed.

== Education ==
In 1938 the Education Board proposed merging the Makaretu (established by early 1878) and Ashley Clinton (established 1876) schools at Sherwood. The site was deemed best suited as it was almost equidistant from both schools and could be serviced by a school bus from both areas. Two petitions were submitted with a number of parents in Ashley Clinton against the proposal and a number in Makaretu in favour. The merger took place in 1963.

Sherwood School is a Year 1–8 co-educational state primary school. It is a decile 6 school with a roll of 27 as of July 2026.

== Climate ==
Climate data for Makaretu Research Station (2km W of Ashley Clinton, 1971–2000)
Month	Jan	Feb	Mar	Apr	May	Jun	Jul	Aug	Sep	Oct	Nov	Dec	Year
Mean daily maximum °C (°F)	23.1 (73.6)	23.0 (73.4)	20.9 (69.6)	17.9 (64.2)	14.8 (58.6)	12.2 (54.0)	11.6 (52.9)	12.4 (54.3)	14.5 (58.1)	16.9 (62.4)	18.9 (66.0)	21.1 (70.0)	17.3 (63.1)
Daily mean °C (°F)	17.1 (62.8)	17.0 (62.6)	15.2 (59.4)	12.5 (54.5)	9.9 (49.8)	7.7 (45.9)	7.2 (45.0)	7.9 (46.2)	9.7 (49.5)	11.7 (53.1)	13.4 (56.1)	15.5 (59.9)	12.1 (53.7)
Mean daily minimum °C (°F)	11.1 (52.0)	11.0 (51.8)	9.5 (49.1)	7.1 (44.8)	5.0 (41.0)	3.1 (37.6)	2.9 (37.2)	3.4 (38.1)	5.0 (41.0)	6.4 (43.5)	7.9 (46.2)	9.9 (49.8)	6.9 (44.3)
Average rainfall mm (inches)	63.4 (2.50)	65.7 (2.59)	103.9 (4.09)	82.3 (3.24)	87.5 (3.44)	88.0 (3.46)	93.1 (3.67)	91.2 (3.59)	111.2 (4.38)	77.0 (3.03)	66.1 (2.60)	98.4 (3.87)	1,027.8 (40.46)
Source: NIWA
