= Flemington, New Zealand =

Flemington, New Zealand may refer to:

- Flemington, Canterbury
- Flemington, Hawke's Bay
