= Ōhuka =

- Interactive map of Ōhuka
- Coordinates: 38.816°S 177.295°E
- Country: New Zealand
- Region: Hawke's Bay Region
- Territorial authority: Wairoa District
- Ward: Wairoa General Ward; Wairoa Māori Ward
- Electorates: Napier; Ikaroa-Rāwhiti and Waiariki (Māori)

Government
  - Territorial authority: Wairoa District Council
  - Mayor of Wairoa: Craig Little
  - Napier MP: Katie Nimon
  - Ikaroa-Rāwhiti MP and Waiariki MP: Cushla Tangaere-Manuel and Rawiri Waititi

Area
  - Total: 764.22 km^{2} (295.07 sq mi)

Population (2023 Census)
  - Total: 174
  - Density: 0.228/km^{2} (0.590/sq mi)

Ōhuka is a village and rural community located in the Wairoa District of the Hawke's Bay Region, on New Zealand's North Island.

The area was settled by farmers in the early 20th century. It has a landscape of rolling hills and farmland.

== Demographics ==
Ōhuka and its surrounds, which include Ruakituri, cover 764.22 km^{2} (295.07 sq mi). It is part of the Frasertown-Ruakituri statistical area.

Historical population for Ōhuka and its surrounds
Year	Pop.	±% p.a.
2006	225	—
2013	174	−3.61%
2018	168	−0.70%
2023	174	+0.70%

Ōhuka had a population of 174 in the 2023 New Zealand census, an increase of 6 people (3.6%) since the 2018 census, and unchanged since the 2013 census. There were 105 males and 66 females in 72 dwellings. The median age was 32.4 years (compared with 38.1 years nationally). There were 42 people (24.1%) aged under 15 years, 39 (22.4%) aged 15 to 29, 63 (36.2%) aged 30 to 64, and 27 (15.5%) aged 65 or older.

People could identify as more than one ethnicity. The results were 67.2% European (Pākehā), 51.7% Māori, and 1.7% Pasifika. English was spoken by 93.1%, Māori by 8.6%, and other languages by 1.7%. No language could be spoken by 3.4% (e.g. too young to talk). The percentage of people born overseas was 1.7, compared with 28.8% nationally.

Religious affiliations were 24.1% Christian, 5.2% Māori religious beliefs, and 1.7% other religions. People who answered that they had no religion were 60.3%, and 8.6% of people did not answer the census question.

Of those at least 15 years old, 12 (9.1%) people had a bachelor's or higher degree, 87 (65.9%) had a post-high school certificate or diploma, and 33 (25.0%) people exclusively held high school qualifications. The median income was $41,000, compared with $41,500 nationally. 6 people (4.5%) earned over $100,000 compared to 12.1% nationally. The employment status of those at least 15 was 90 (68.2%) full-time, 21 (15.9%) part-time, and 3 (2.3%) unemployed.

== Education ==
Ohuka School is a Year 1–8 co-educational state primary school. It is a decile 10 school with a roll of 11 as of July 2026.
