= Frasertown =

Settlement in Hawke's Bay Region, New Zealand

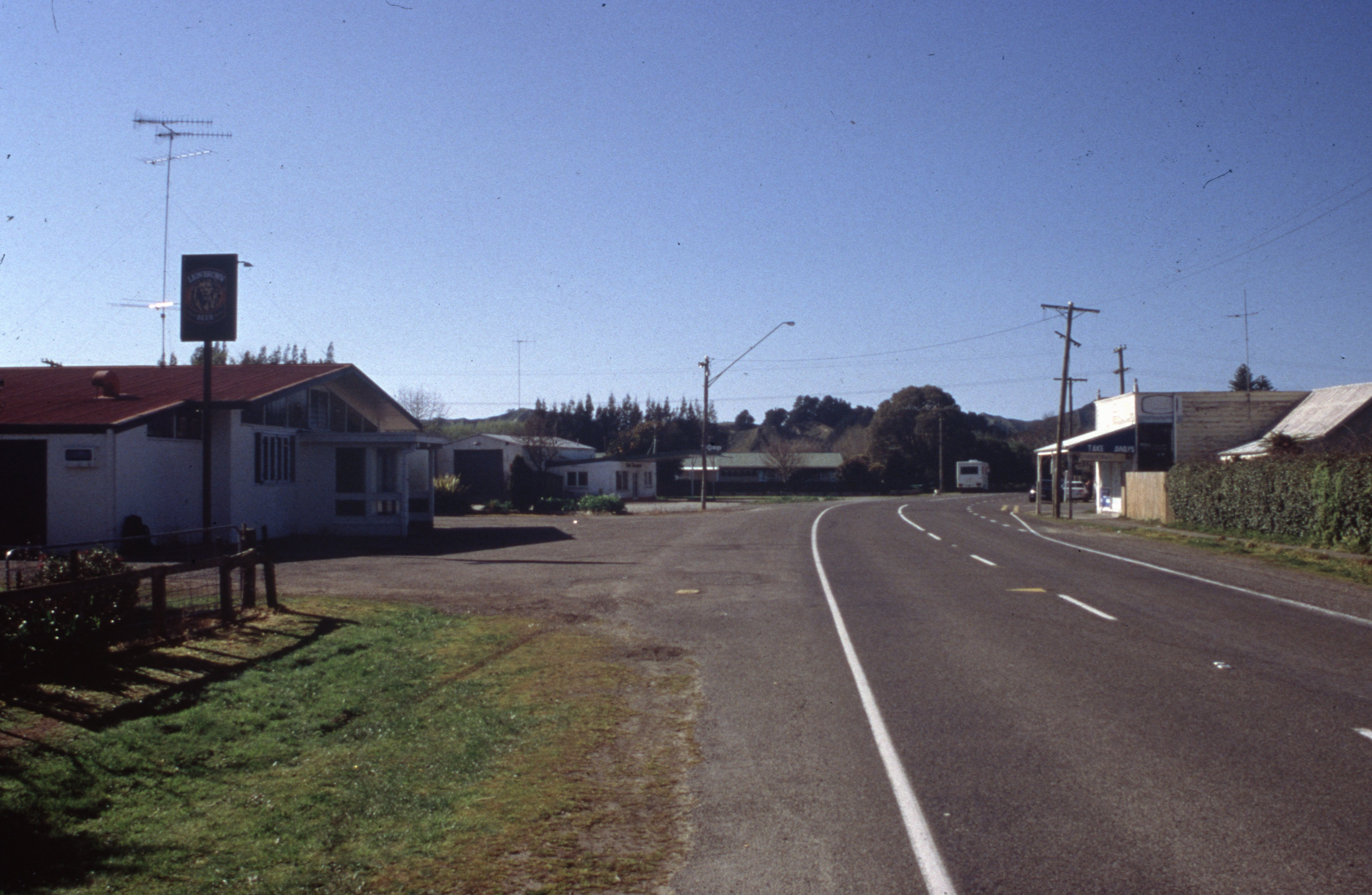
- Interactive map of Frasertown
- Coordinates: 38°58′S 177°24′E
- Country: New Zealand
- Region: Hawke's Bay
- Territorial authority: Wairoa District
- Ward: Wairoa General Ward; Wairoa Māori Ward
- Electorates: Napier; Ikaroa-Rāwhiti (Māori)

Government
  - Territorial authority: Wairoa District Council
  - Mayor of Wairoa: Craig Little
  - Napier MP: Katie Nimon
  - Ikaroa-Rāwhiti MP: Cushla Tangaere-Manuel

Area
  - Total: 1.36 km^{2} (0.53 sq mi)

Population (June 2025)
  - Total: 250
  - Density: 180/km^{2} (480/sq mi)

Frasertown is a small settlement in the northern Hawke's Bay Region of New Zealand's eastern North Island.

It is located inland from Wairoa at the junction of SH38, and the inland route (the Tiniroto Road; the former SH36) to Gisborne. State Highway 38 leads from Wai-O-Tapu via Murupara, The Ureweras, Lake Waikaremoana and Frasertown to Wairoa. It gives a short, but (partly) unsealed, winding and climbing connection to the Central North Island Rotorua. It is named for Major James Fraser, who led military forces in Wairoa in the 1860s.

== Demographics ==
Statistics New Zealand describes Frasertown as a rural settlement, which covers 1.36 km^{2} (0.53 sq mi). It had an estimated population of 250 as of June 2025, with a population density of 184 people per km^{2}. It is part of the larger Frasertown-Ruakituri statistical area.

Historical population for Frasertown
Year	Pop.	±% p.a.
2006	252	—
2013	213	−2.37%
2018	255	+3.66%
2023	240	−1.21%

Frasertown had a population of 240 in the 2023 New Zealand census, a decrease of 15 people (−5.9%) since the 2018 census, and an increase of 27 people (12.7%) since the 2013 census. There were 114 males and 123 females in 90 dwellings. 1.2% of people identified as LGBTIQ+. The median age was 45.2 years (compared with 38.1 years nationally). There were 42 people (17.5%) aged under 15 years, 42 (17.5%) aged 15 to 29, 99 (41.2%) aged 30 to 64, and 54 (22.5%) aged 65 or older.

People could identify as more than one ethnicity. The results were 55.0% European (Pākehā), 61.2% Māori, 2.5% Pasifika, and 2.5% other, which includes people giving their ethnicity as "New Zealander". English was spoken by 96.2%, Māori by 16.2%, and other languages by 1.2%. No language could be spoken by 1.2% (e.g. too young to talk). New Zealand Sign Language was known by 1.2%. The percentage of people born overseas was 3.8, compared with 28.8% nationally.

Religious affiliations were 28.8% Christian, and 18.8% Māori religious beliefs. People who answered that they had no religion were 41.2%, and 8.8% of people did not answer the census question.

Of those at least 15 years old, 21 (10.6%) people had a bachelor's or higher degree, 120 (60.6%) had a post-high school certificate or diploma, and 57 (28.8%) people exclusively held high school qualifications. The median income was $30,400, compared with $41,500 nationally. 15 people (7.6%) earned over $100,000 compared to 12.1% nationally. The employment status of those at least 15 was 93 (47.0%) full-time, 24 (12.1%) part-time, and 6 (3.0%) unemployed.

=== Frasertown-Ruakituri statistical area ===
Frasertown-Ruakituri statistical area, which also includes Ohuka and Ruakituri, covers 1,333.71 km^{2} (514.95 sq mi) and had an estimated population of 920 as of June 2025, with a population density of 0.69 people per km^{2}.

Historical population of Frasertown-Ruakituri
Year	Pop.	±% p.a.
2006	927	—
2013	861	−1.05%
2018	861	+0.00%
2023	879	+0.41%

Frasertown-Ruakituri had a population of 879 in the 2023 New Zealand census, an increase of 18 people (2.1%) since the 2018 census, and an increase of 18 people (2.1%) since the 2013 census. There were 456 males, 420 females, and 3 people of other genders in 318 dwellings. 1.0% of people identified as LGBTIQ+. The median age was 37.7 years (compared with 38.1 years nationally). There were 198 people (22.5%) aged under 15 years, 153 (17.4%) aged 15 to 29, 363 (41.3%) aged 30 to 64, and 165 (18.8%) aged 65 or older.

People could identify as more than one ethnicity. The results were 67.2% European (Pākehā), 50.2% Māori, 1.7% Pasifika, and 1.4% other, which includes people giving their ethnicity as "New Zealander". English was spoken by 96.2%, Māori by 12.6%, Samoan by 0.3%, and other languages by 1.0%. No language could be spoken by 2.4% (e.g. too young to talk). New Zealand Sign Language was known by 0.3%. The percentage of people born overseas was 3.8, compared with 28.8% nationally.

Religious affiliations were 25.9% Christian, 10.9% Māori religious beliefs, and 0.7% other religions. People who answered that they had no religion were 56.0%, and 7.2% of people did not answer the census question.

Of those at least 15 years old, 75 (11.0%) people had a bachelor's or higher degree, 423 (62.1%) had a post-high school certificate or diploma, and 180 (26.4%) people exclusively held high school qualifications. The median income was $34,000, compared with $41,500 nationally. 45 people (6.6%) earned over $100,000 compared to 12.1% nationally. The employment status of those at least 15 was 354 (52.0%) full-time, 108 (15.9%) part-time, and 21 (3.1%) unemployed.

== Marae ==
The township includes a number of marae (meeting grounds) and wharenui (meeting houses) for the local iwi (tribe) of Ngāti Kahungunu and its hapū (sub-tribes):

- Aranui Marae and Arapera or Te Poho o Ngapera wharenui, affiliated with Ngāi Tamaterangi and Ngāti Peehi hapū.
- Arimawha Marae, affiliates with Ngāti Tamaterangi hapū.
- Pākōwhai Marae and Te Huinga o Te Aroha wharenui, affiliated with Ngāti Mihi hapū.
- Pūtahi Marae and Te Poho o Hinepehinga wharenui, affiliated with Ngāti Hinepehinga hapū.

In October 2020, the Government committed $1,949,075 from the Provincial Growth Fund to upgrade all four marae and 20 other Ngāti Kahungunu marae, creating 164 jobs.

== Education ==
Frasertown School is a Year 1–6 co-educational state primary school. It is a decile 4 school with a roll of 113 as of July 2026. The school opened in 1868.
