= Sherenden =

Settlement in Hawke's Bay Region, New Zealand

- Settlement
- Interactive map of Sherenden
- Coordinates: 39.505217°S 176.575348°E
- Country: New Zealand
- Region: Hawke's Bay Region
- Territorial authority: Hastings District
- Ward: Mohaka General Ward; Takitimu Māori Ward
- Community: Hastings District Rural Community
- Subdivision: Kaweka subdivision
- Electorates: Napier; Ikaroa-Rāwhiti (Māori)

Government
  - Territorial Authority: Hastings District Council
  - Mayor of Hastings: Wendy Schollum
  - Napier MP: Katie Nimon
  - Ikaroa-Rāwhiti MP: Cushla Tangaere-Manuel
- Postcode(s): 4179

Sherenden is a settlement in the Hastings District and Hawke's Bay Region of New Zealand's North Island.

It was established around a school house in 1916. The community fundraised to build a swimming pool in 1961.

The community of Otamauri is located west of the Sherenden village.

== Demographics ==
The Sherenden-Crownthorpe statistical area covers 765.79 km^{2} (295.67 sq mi) and had an estimated population of 1,410 as of June 2025, with a population density of 1.8 people per km^{2}.

Historical population for Sherenden-Crownthorpe
Year	Pop.	±% p.a.
2006	1,020	—
2013	1,206	+2.42%
2018	1,317	+1.78%
2023	1,395	+1.16%

Sherenden-Crownthorpe had a population of 1,395 in the 2023 New Zealand census, an increase of 78 people (5.9%) since the 2018 census, and an increase of 189 people (15.7%) since the 2013 census. There were 690 males, 702 females, and 3 people of other genders in 507 dwellings. 1.7% of people identified as LGBTIQ+. The median age was 43.4 years (compared with 38.1 years nationally). There were 282 people (20.2%) aged under 15 years, 180 (12.9%) aged 15 to 29, 741 (53.1%) aged 30 to 64, and 195 (14.0%) aged 65 or older.

People could identify as more than one ethnicity. The results were 93.5% European (Pākehā); 11.2% Māori; 1.1% Pasifika; 0.9% Asian; 0.9% Middle Eastern, Latin American and African New Zealanders (MELAA); and 6.0% other, which includes people giving their ethnicity as "New Zealander". English was spoken by 98.7%, Māori by 1.9%, and other languages by 4.7%. No language could be spoken by 1.5% (e.g. too young to talk). New Zealand Sign Language was known by 0.9%. The percentage of people born overseas was 10.5, compared with 28.8% nationally.

Religious affiliations were 28.0% Christian, 0.2% Māori religious beliefs, 0.2% Buddhist, 0.2% New Age, and 0.9% other religions. People who answered that they had no religion were 62.8%, and 7.5% of people did not answer the census question.

Of those at least 15 years old, 261 (23.5%) people had a bachelor's or higher degree, 681 (61.2%) had a post-high school certificate or diploma, and 177 (15.9%) people exclusively held high school qualifications. The median income was $50,100, compared with $41,500 nationally. 162 people (14.6%) earned over $100,000 compared to 12.1% nationally. The employment status of those at least 15 was 663 (59.6%) full-time, 195 (17.5%) part-time, and 15 (1.3%) unemployed.

== Education ==
Sherenden and Districts School is a co-educational state primary school, with a roll of 48 as of July 2026. It opened in 1916. Waiwhare School merged to Sherendon School in 1996. Waiwhare School's building was constructed at Waihau in 1930 and moved to Waiwhare in 1952.

Pukehamoamoa School is a co-educational state primary school, with a roll of 58 as of July 2026. It is about 11 km southeast of Sherenden. It opened in 1921.
