= Parekura Horomia =

New Zealand politician

The Honourable Parekura Horomia
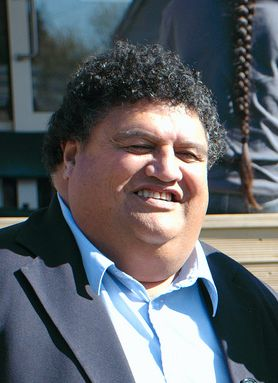
- Parekura Horomia in 2008

40th Minister of Māori Affairs
- In office 26 July 2000 – 19 November 2008
- Prime Minister: Helen Clark
- Preceded by: Dover Samuels
- Succeeded by: Pita Sharples

Member of the New Zealand Parliament for Ikaroa-Rāwhiti
- In office 27 November 1999 – 29 April 2013
- Preceded by: New constituency
- Succeeded by: Meka Whaitiri
- Majority: 6,541 (60.71%) (at 2011 election)

Personal details
- Born: Parekura Tureia Horomia; 9 November 1950 Tolaga Bay, New Zealand
- Died: 29 April 2013 (aged 62) Tolaga Bay, New Zealand
- Party: Labour
- Committees: Māori Affairs Committee

Parekura Tureia Horomia (9 November 1950 – 29 April 2013) was a New Zealand Labour Party politician who served as Minister of Māori Affairs between 2000 and 2008.

== Early life ==
Horomia was born in Tolaga Bay of Ngāti Porou, Te Aitanga Hauiti, Ngāti Kahungunu and Ngāi Tahu descent. He had seven brothers and sisters. As a schoolboy he used to walk five kilometres to school and back without shoes.

In his early life, he worked as a manual labourer, then as a printer in the newspaper industry. Later, Horomia became involved in the Department of Labour's East Coast work schemes and was appointed to supervisory positions—rising to general manager of the Community Employment Group by 1992. At the same time, he began to take on a number of prominent positions with Māori community organisations. In 1990, Horomia was awarded the New Zealand 1990 Commemoration Medal.

== Member of Parliament ==
New Zealand Parliament
Years	Term	Electorate	List	Party
1999–2002	46th	Ikaroa-Rāwhiti	25	Labour
2002–2005	47th	Ikaroa-Rāwhiti	5	Labour
2005–2008	48th	Ikaroa-Rāwhiti	5	Labour
2008–2011	49th	Ikaroa-Rāwhiti	5	Labour
2011–2013	50th	Ikaroa-Rāwhiti	6	Labour

In the 1999 election, Horomia stood as the Labour Party candidate for the Ikaroa-Rāwhiti electorate, a Māori electorate on the east coast of the North Island, stretching from Gisborne to Upper Hutt. He defeated Derek Fox, a prominent figure in Māori politics, who was standing as an independent candidate.

In the new Labour government formed after that election, Horomia became a minister outside cabinet, being Associate Minister of Māori Affairs, Associate Minister for Economic Development, Associate Minister of Employment, and Associate Minister of Education. In 2000, Dover Samuels was forced to step down as Minister of Māori Affairs after criminal allegations were made against him, and Horomia was appointed in his place. Although Samuels was cleared, it was decided that Horomia would retain the Māori Affairs portfolio.

Labour was defeated in the 2008 general election, but Horomia retained his seat – increasing his majority to about 1600. This was despite a challenge from well-known broadcaster Derek Fox.

== Achievements ==
Horomia played a significant role in setting up Māori Television and expanding the role of iwi radio in New Zealand. Former Prime Minister Helen Clark said she had frequently relied on his knowledge of Māoridom and Māoritanga and his input was crucial to the Foreshore and Seabed legislation, which Labour passed in 2004 while he was minister. After the controversial bill became law, Associate Māori Affairs Minister Tariana Turia resigned from Labour to form the Māori Party. The law was repealed by the National Government in 2011.

== Death ==
Horomia was overweight for much of his life. He talked about his health battles and tried to lose weight many times. In 2004, he went on a public diet to encourage others to do the same. He died at his home on 29 April 2013 at the age of 62. As Horomia was an electorate MP, a by-election was held on 29 June 2013 to elect a replacement.

Tributes after his death came from not only his Labour MP colleagues, but also from the National Government. Labour leader David Shearer cut short a trip to Washington to attend his funeral and said he had "an incredible work ethic, travelling to all parts of the country. He was accepted at pretty much every marae in the country, he was incredibly well-liked, had enormous heart, who worked so hard for his people."

His tangi was held the following week, and the funeral on 4 May.

== Sources ==
- Maiden speech 15 February 2000

New Zealand Parliament
New constituency	Member of Parliament for Ikaroa-Rāwhiti; 1999–2013	Succeeded by Meka Whaitiri
Political offices
Preceded by Dover Samuels	Minister of Māori Affairs; 2000–2008	Succeeded by Pita Sharples
