= Greenmeadows, New Zealand =

Suburb of Napier, New Zealand

Greenmeadows
- Suburb
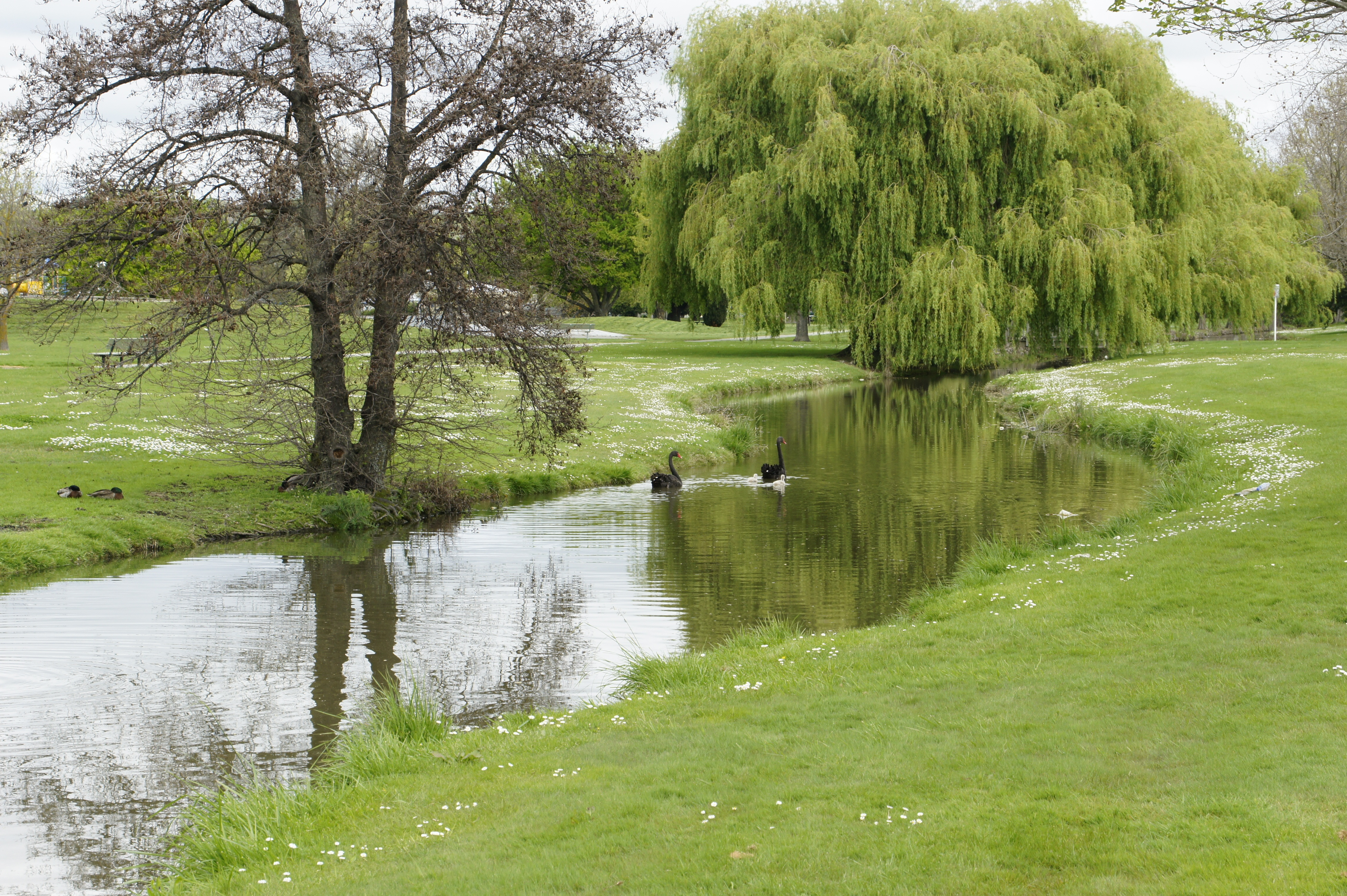
- Anderson Park
- Interactive map of Greenmeadows
- Coordinates: 39.526003°S 176.861586°E
- Country: New Zealand
- City: Napier
- Local authority: Napier City Council
- Electoral ward: Taradale Ward

Area
  - Land: 291 ha (720 acres)

Population (June 2025)
  - Total: 5,730
  - Density: 1,970/km^{2} (5,100/sq mi)

Poraiti	Tamatea	Pirimai
	Greenmeadows	Marewa
Taradale		Meeanee

Greenmeadows is a suburb of the city of Napier, in the Hawke's Bay region of New Zealand's eastern North Island. It is part of the Taradale ward of Napier and was part of the earlier Taradale Borough.

== History ==
Greenmeadows was purchased in 1857 from the government by Henry Stokes Tiffin and brothers Henry and George Allen. They used it as a sheep run. The name Greenmeadows comes from the presence of danthonia grass in the area.

== Parks ==
Anderson Park, used from 1886 to 1960 by the Napier Park Racing Club, is now a passive recreation park.

== Demographics ==
Greenmeadows covers 2.91 km^{2} (1.12 sq mi) and had an estimated population of 5,730 as of June 2025, with a population density of 1,969 people per km^{2}.

Historical population
Year	Pop.	±% p.a.
2006	5,145	—
2013	5,391	+0.67%
2018	5,559	+0.62%
2023	5,652	+0.33%

Greenmeadows had a population of 5,652 in the 2023 New Zealand census, an increase of 93 people (1.7%) since the 2018 census, and an increase of 261 people (4.8%) since the 2013 census. There were 2,628 males, 3,012 females, and 12 people of other genders in 2,385 dwellings. 1.7% of people identified as LGBTIQ+. The median age was 50.6 years (compared with 38.1 years nationally). There were 852 people (15.1%) aged under 15 years, 768 (13.6%) aged 15 to 29, 2,322 (41.1%) aged 30 to 64, and 1,713 (30.3%) aged 65 or older.

People could identify as more than one ethnicity. The results were 85.6% European (Pākehā); 14.8% Māori; 2.1% Pasifika; 6.4% Asian; 1.0% Middle Eastern, Latin American and African New Zealanders (MELAA); and 3.5% other, which includes people giving their ethnicity as "New Zealander". English was spoken by 97.6%, Māori by 3.2%, Samoan by 0.4%, and other languages by 8.1%. No language could be spoken by 1.5% (e.g. too young to talk). New Zealand Sign Language was known by 0.5%. The percentage of people born overseas was 17.9, compared with 28.8% nationally.

Religious affiliations were 34.0% Christian, 1.1% Hindu, 0.5% Islam, 1.0% Māori religious beliefs, 0.9% Buddhist, 0.5% New Age, 0.1% Jewish, and 0.9% other religions. People who answered that they had no religion were 53.3%, and 7.8% of people did not answer the census question.

Of those at least 15 years old, 936 (19.5%) people had a bachelor's or higher degree, 2,640 (55.0%) had a post-high school certificate or diploma, and 1,224 (25.5%) people exclusively held high school qualifications. The median income was $37,400, compared with $41,500 nationally. 483 people (10.1%) earned over $100,000 compared to 12.1% nationally. The employment status of those at least 15 was 2,103 (43.8%) full-time, 627 (13.1%) part-time, and 75 (1.6%) unemployed.

Individual statistical areas
Name	Area (km^{2})	Population	Density (per km^{2})	Dwellings	Median age	Median income
Greenmeadows West	1.10	2,022	1,838	894	60.4 years	$33,600
Greenmeadows Central	0.95	1,458	1,535	627	49.7 years	$40,100
Greenmeadows South	0.85	2,175	2,559	864	41.1 years	$39,300
New Zealand					38.1 years	$41,500

== Education ==
Greenmeadows has three schools:

- Greenmeadows School, a state primary school for Years 1 to 6 with a roll of 492. It opened in 1911.
- Parkside Christian Seventh-day Adventist School, a state-integrated primary school for Years 1 to 8 with a roll of 61. It opened in 1978 and became state-integrated in 1993.
- St Joseph's Māori Girls' College, a girls' state-integrated Catholic intermediate and high school for Years 7 to 13 with a roll of 166. It opened in 1867 as St Joseph's Providence, a private boarding-only school. it was rebuilt after the 1931 Hawke's Bay earthquake and reopened in 1935. In 1982 it became state-integrated, and since 1993 it has accepted some day students.

Rolls are as of July 2025.
