= Ongaonga, New Zealand =

Settlement in Hawke's Bay Region, New Zealand

Ongaonga
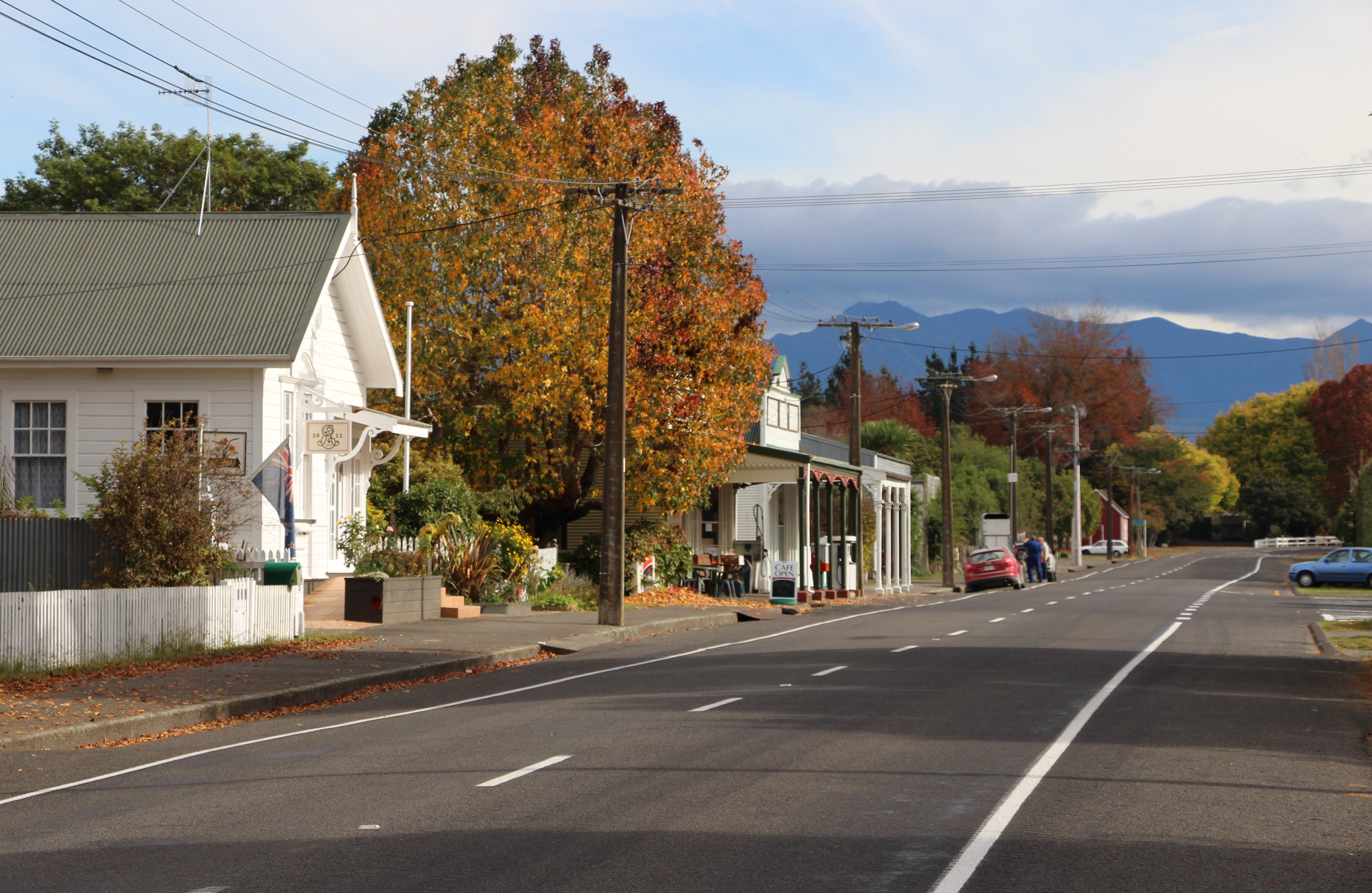
- Bridge Street in 2016

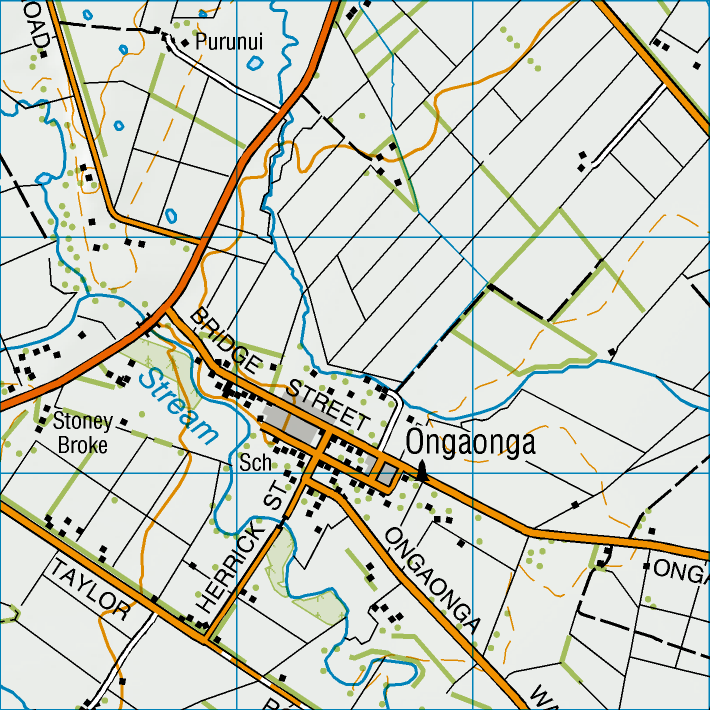
- Coordinates: 39.914°S 176.420°E
- Country: New Zealand
- Region: Hawke's Bay
- Territorial authority: Central Hawke's Bay District
- Ward: Aramoana-Ruahine
- Electorates: Tukituki; Ikaroa-Rāwhiti (Māori)

Government
  - Territorial Authority: Central Hawke's Bay District Council
  - Regional council: Hawke's Bay Regional Council
  - Mayor of Central Hawke's Bay: Will Foley
  - Tukituki MP: Catherine Wedd
  - Ikaroa-Rāwhiti MP: Cushla Tangaere-Manuel

Area
  - Total: 0.68 km^{2} (0.26 sq mi)

Population (June 2025)
  - Total: 150
  - Density: 220/km^{2} (570/sq mi)
- Postcode(s): 4278

Ongaonga, also spelt Onga Onga, is a town in the Central Hawke's Bay District of New Zealand's North Island. It is located 20 kilometres west of Waipawa and a similar distance from Waipukurau.

== History ==
The town was founded in 1872 when Henry Hamilton Bridge subdivided his estate, known as Fairfield. The town was named after the nearby Ongaonga Stream. Bridge established a school, church, and reserve for the town. The general store and tearooms was opened in 1899 and still provides the local community and visitors with groceries, refreshments, postal services and petrol. With the subdivision of the Fairfield and other neighbouring estates in the 20th century Ongaonga developed into a service town for the nearby farms.

The modern village consists of a general store, tea rooms and the Sandford Arms Tavern. Ongaonga has a collection of historic buildings all built at a similar time by the Coles Brothers Builders and Joiners. The main street is Bridge Street, named after the town's founder.

Ongaonga is known for its heritage properties, notably the category 1 Coles Joinery Factory, the only extant rural joinery factory in New Zealand.

The first church in Ongaonga was opened in 1901 by Henry Bridge as an interdenominational Protestan church. In 1914 the Methodists establish their own church and in 1959 the church was transferred to the local Anglican diocese, becoming the Church of the Good Shepherd. In 1999 monthly services at the church were stopped. The building has a category 2 registration with Heritage New Zealand.

Postal services were originally run out of the Sandford Hotel until a dedicated post office was constructed in 1910. The post office serviced the town until it was closed down alongside 432 other post offices under the Fourth Labour Government

== Culture ==
The small country town also supports several sporting and cultural clubs. Ongaonga often joins with Tikokino in rugby, to compete against other Central Hawke's Bay clubs. Ongaonga also hosts an annual ANZAC day parade. The Ongaonga Golf Course is located one kilometre south-west of the town.

== Demographics ==
Statistics New Zealand describes Ongaonga as a rural settlement, which covers 0.68 km^{2} (0.26 sq mi). It had an estimated population of 150 as of June 2025, with a population density of 221 people per km^{2}. Ongaonga is part of the larger Makaretu statistical area.

Historical population of Ongaonga
Year	Pop.	±% p.a.
2006	189	—
2013	129	−5.31%
2018	129	+0.00%
2023	153	+3.47%
The 2006 population is for a larger area of 10.53 km^{2}. Source:

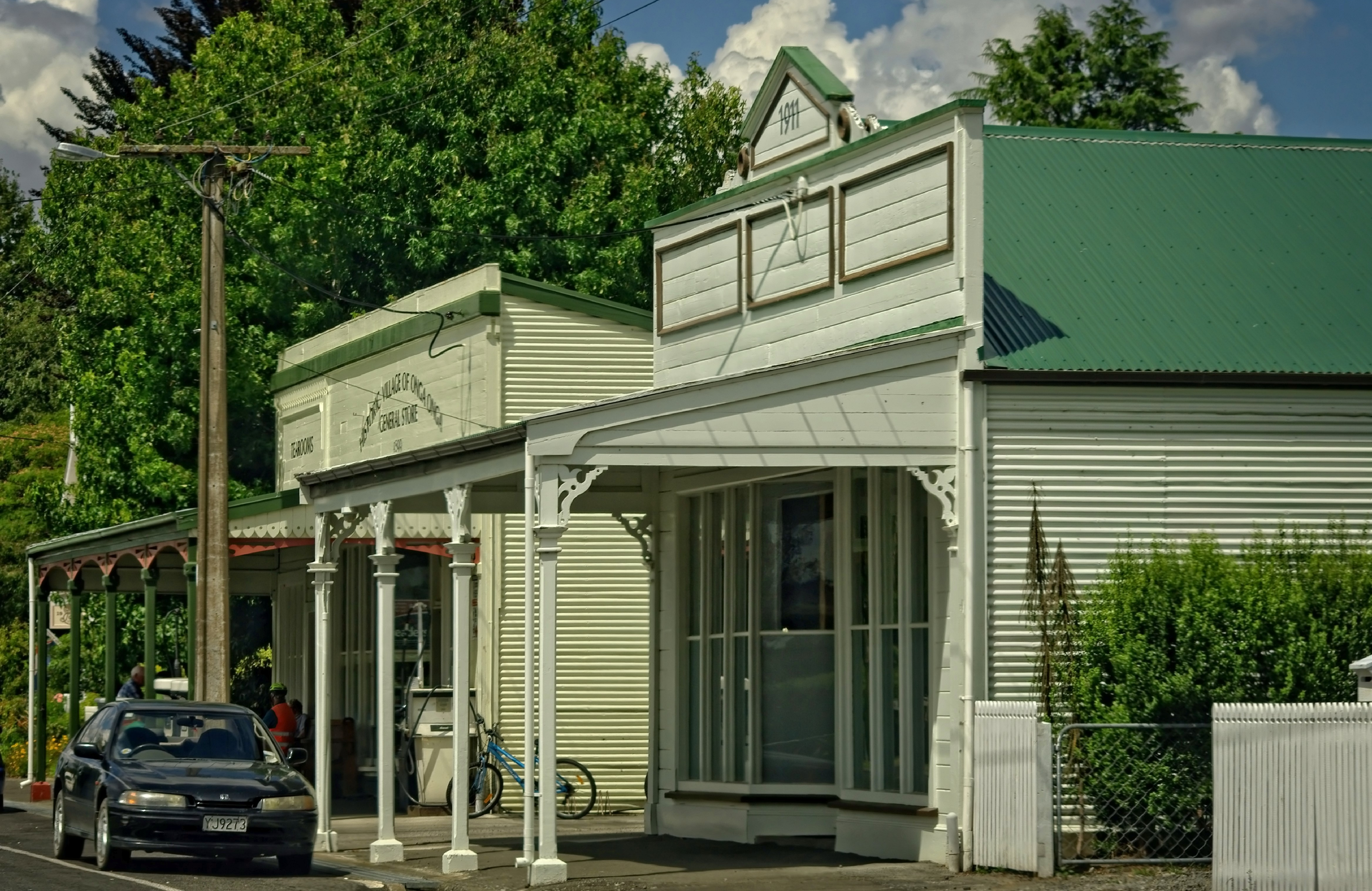
Wooden shop buildings including the General Store, Ongaonga

Ongaonga had a population of 153 in the 2023 New Zealand census, an increase of 24 people (18.6%) since the 2018 census, and an increase of 24 people (18.6%) since the 2013 census. There were 78 males and 75 females in 60 dwellings. 2.0% of people identified as LGBTIQ+. The median age was 51.6 years (compared with 38.1 years nationally). There were 30 people (19.6%) aged under 15 years, 15 (9.8%) aged 15 to 29, 63 (41.2%) aged 30 to 64, and 45 (29.4%) aged 65 or older.

People could identify as more than one ethnicity. The results were 92.2% European (Pākehā), 17.6% Māori, and 7.8% other, which includes people giving their ethnicity as "New Zealander". English was spoken by 98.0%, Māori by 3.9%, and other languages by 3.9%. The percentage of people born overseas was 7.8, compared with 28.8% nationally.

Religious affiliations were 29.4% Christian, 2.0% Māori religious beliefs, and 3.9% other religions. People who answered that they had no religion were 56.9%, and 7.8% of people did not answer the census question.

Of those at least 15 years old, 21 (17.1%) people had a bachelor's or higher degree, 66 (53.7%) had a post-high school certificate or diploma, and 36 (29.3%) people exclusively held high school qualifications. The median income was $32,200, compared with $41,500 nationally. 6 people (4.9%) earned over $100,000 compared to 12.1% nationally. The employment status of those at least 15 was 51 (41.5%) full-time, 18 (14.6%) part-time, and 3 (2.4%) unemployed.

=== Makaretu statistical area ===
Makaretu statistical area, which also includes Takapau, covers 789.56 km^{2} (304.85 sq mi) and had an estimated population of 2,750 as of June 2025, with a population density of 3.5 people per km^{2}.

Historical population for Makaretu
Year	Pop.	±% p.a.
2006	2,244	—
2013	2,295	+0.32%
2018	2,430	+1.15%
2023	2,637	+1.65%

Makaretu had a population of 2,637 in the 2023 New Zealand census, an increase of 207 people (8.5%) since the 2018 census, and an increase of 342 people (14.9%) since the 2013 census. There were 1,371 males, 1,263 females, and 3 people of other genders in 936 dwellings. 1.4% of people identified as LGBTIQ+. The median age was 42.1 years (compared with 38.1 years nationally). There were 546 people (20.7%) aged under 15 years, 378 (14.3%) aged 15 to 29, 1,254 (47.6%) aged 30 to 64, and 459 (17.4%) aged 65 or older.

People could identify as more than one ethnicity. The results were 83.4% European (Pākehā); 22.1% Māori; 2.7% Pasifika; 5.5% Asian; 0.2% Middle Eastern, Latin American and African New Zealanders (MELAA); and 2.3% other, which includes people giving their ethnicity as "New Zealander". English was spoken by 97.3%, Māori by 4.3%, Samoan by 1.3%, and other languages by 5.8%. No language could be spoken by 1.9% (e.g. too young to talk). New Zealand Sign Language was known by 0.6%. The percentage of people born overseas was 15.5, compared with 28.8% nationally.

Religious affiliations were 32.4% Christian, 0.5% Hindu, 0.5% Islam, 1.1% Māori religious beliefs, 0.6% Buddhist, 0.7% New Age, and 0.8% other religions. People who answered that they had no religion were 55.9%, and 7.7% of people did not answer the census question.

Of those at least 15 years old, 366 (17.5%) people had a bachelor's or higher degree, 1,176 (56.2%) had a post-high school certificate or diploma, and 540 (25.8%) people exclusively held high school qualifications. The median income was $40,100, compared with $41,500 nationally. 141 people (6.7%) earned over $100,000 compared to 12.1% nationally. The employment status of those at least 15 was 1,131 (54.1%) full-time, 297 (14.2%) part-time, and 42 (2.0%) unemployed.

== Education ==
Ongaonga School is a Year 1–8 co-educational state primary school. It is a decile 6 school with a roll of 28 as of July 2026. The school opened in 1875.

Ongaonga Play Center and Ongaonga Town Hall are located next to the school.

Over the last 50 years, youth organisations have come and gone. The town has hosted Scouts New Zealand and Girl Guides.
