= Pirimai =

Suburb of Napier, New Zealand

- Suburb
- Interactive map of Pirimai
- Coordinates: 39.513188°S 176.883169°E
- Country: New Zealand
- City: Napier
- Local authority: Napier City Council
- Electoral ward: Nelson Park; Onekawa-Tamatea

Area
  - Land: 138 ha (340 acres)

Population (June 2025)
  - Total: 4,120
  - Density: 2,990/km^{2} (7,730/sq mi)

		Onekawa
Tamatea	Pirimai
Greenmeadows	Meeanee

Pirimai is a suburb of the city of Napier, in the Hawke's Bay region of New Zealand's eastern North Island. Development of housing began there in 1961–62. The suburb includes Pirimai Park and playground.

== Demographics ==
Pirimai covers 1.38 km^{2} (0.53 sq mi) and had an estimated population of 4,120 as of June 2025, with a population density of 2,986 people per km^{2}.

Historical population
Year	Pop.	±% p.a.
2006	3,681	—
2013	3,597	−0.33%
2018	3,852	+1.38%
2023	4,017	+0.84%

Pirimai had a population of 4,017 in the 2023 New Zealand census, an increase of 165 people (4.3%) since the 2018 census, and an increase of 420 people (11.7%) since the 2013 census. There were 2,001 males, 2,001 females, and 15 people of other genders in 1,449 dwellings. 2.5% of people identified as LGBTIQ+. The median age was 34.8 years (compared with 38.1 years nationally). There were 882 people (22.0%) aged under 15 years, 777 (19.3%) aged 15 to 29, 1,779 (44.3%) aged 30 to 64, and 579 (14.4%) aged 65 or older.

People could identify as more than one ethnicity. The results were 76.0% European (Pākehā); 29.1% Māori; 5.2% Pasifika; 7.3% Asian; 0.4% Middle Eastern, Latin American and African New Zealanders (MELAA); and 2.2% other, which includes people giving their ethnicity as "New Zealander". English was spoken by 96.3%, Māori by 6.8%, Samoan by 1.7%, and other languages by 7.8%. No language could be spoken by 2.4% (e.g. too young to talk). New Zealand Sign Language was known by 0.7%. The percentage of people born overseas was 15.9, compared with 28.8% nationally.

Religious affiliations were 24.6% Christian, 1.6% Hindu, 0.7% Islam, 3.1% Māori religious beliefs, 0.5% Buddhist, 0.4% New Age, 0.1% Jewish, and 1.9% other religions. People who answered that they had no religion were 58.9%, and 8.4% of people did not answer the census question.

Of those at least 15 years old, 486 (15.5%) people had a bachelor's or higher degree, 1,818 (58.0%) had a post-high school certificate or diploma, and 846 (27.0%) people exclusively held high school qualifications. The median income was $43,500, compared with $41,500 nationally. 174 people (5.6%) earned over $100,000 compared to 12.1% nationally. The employment status of those at least 15 was 1,770 (56.5%) full-time, 354 (11.3%) part-time, and 72 (2.3%) unemployed.

Individual statistical areas
Name	Area (km^{2})	Population	Density (per km^{2})	Dwellings	Median age	Median income
Pirimai West	0.62	1,704	2,748	651	35.6 years	$44,600
Pirimai East	0.76	2,316	3,047	798	34.0 years	$42,700
New Zealand					38.1 years	$41,500
