= Meka Whaitiri =

New Zealand politician (born 1965)

The Honourable Meka Whaitiri
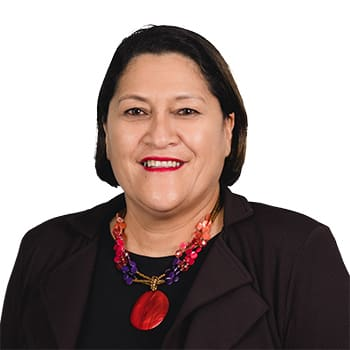

63rd Minister of Customs
- In office 6 November 2020 – 3 May 2023
- Prime Minister: Jacinda Ardern; Chris Hipkins
- Preceded by: Jenny Salesa
- Succeeded by: Damien O'Connor (acting)
- In office 26 October 2017 – 30 August 2018
- Prime Minister: Jacinda Ardern
- Preceded by: Tim Macindoe
- Succeeded by: Kris Faafoi

Member of the New Zealand Parliament for Ikaroa-Rāwhiti
- In office 29 June 2013 – 14 October 2023
- Preceded by: Parekura Horomia
- Succeeded by: Cushla Tangaere-Manuel

Personal details
- Born: Melissa Heni Mekameka Whaitiri; 11 January 1965 (age 61)
- Party: Te Pāti Māori (2023–present); Labour (before 2023)
- Children: 2

Melissa Heni Mekameka Whaitiri (born 11 January 1965) is a New Zealand politician and former member of the New Zealand House of Representatives. She was first elected to Parliament in the 2013 Ikaroa-Rāwhiti by-election for the Labour Party.

Whaitiri served as Minister of Customs for the Sixth Labour Government on two separate occasions but resigned from her party on 3 May 2023 to contest the 2023 general election for Te Pāti Māori. For the remainder of the parliamentary term, she was treated as an independent member in the House, and was defeated in her bid to retain Ikaroa-Rāwhiti by the Labour candidate, Cushla Tangaere-Manuel.

== Early life ==
Whaitiri was born in Manutuke near Gisborne in 1965. Her parents were Wirangi Wiremu Whaitiri, a Korean War veteran, and Mei Whaitiri (née Irihapiti Robin), who was the model used for the Pania of the Reef statue in Napier in 1954. Whaitiri's father was a native speaker of te reo Māori who taught the language to his daughter. She has four siblings and was brought up in the Hastings suburb of Whakatu by a whānau of mostly freezing workers. She has affiliation to Rongowhakaata and Ngāti Kahungunu. At Karamu High School, she was head girl.

She first worked at a freezing works before obtaining a master's degree in education from Victoria University of Wellington. In both softball and netball, she competed to national level. She was selected by the Silver Ferns as a non-travelling reserve player. Her first professional job was for Parekura Horomia, then a manager in the Department of Labour, who made her wait eight hours before he saw her, but then hired her immediately. She later worked for the Māori Women's Welfare League before returning to the Department of Labour as deputy secretary. She worked as an adviser in Horomia's office when he was Minister of Māori Affairs. From 2009 until her election to Parliament, she was chief executive officer of Ngāti Kahungunu iwi.

Whaitiri has two sons. She is openly lesbian and was previously in a relationship with Kiri Allan.

== Member of Parliament ==
New Zealand Parliament
| Years | Term | Electorate | | Party |
|---|---|---|---|---|
| 2013–2014 | 50th | Ikaroa-Rāwhiti | | Labour |
| 2014–2017 | 51st | Ikaroa-Rāwhiti | 19 | Labour |
| 2017–2020 | 52nd | Ikaroa-Rāwhiti | none | Labour |
| 2020–2023 | 53rd | Ikaroa-Rāwhiti | 28 | Labour |
| 2023 | Changed allegiance to: | | | Independent |

=== In opposition, 2013–2017 ===
Parekura Horomia, MP for Ikaroa-Rāwhiti since 1999, died on 29 April 2013. A by-election to fill his seat took place on 29 June of that year.

Whaitiri defeated five others for the Labour nomination, including Hastings district councillor Henare O'Keefe, broadcaster Shane Taurima and Ngāti Kahungunu board member Hayden Hape.

Most political analysts predicted that Labour would hold Ikaroa-Rāwhiti, which Horomia had held since its formation for the 1999 election. At his last election in 2011, Horomia had won a majority of 6,541 votes. Whaitiri won the by-election with a majority of 1659 votes over Mana Party candidate Te Hamua Nikora. Māori Party candidate Na Raihania, who had also been endorsed by National, came third. Right-wing political blogger David Farrar called the by-election a "good victory for Labour", and commented that Whaitiri "could be one of the better Labour MPs".

Whaitiri retained Ikaroa-Rawhiti during the 2014 New Zealand general election by a margin of 4,673 votes. As an opposition MP for her first two terms, she was Labour Party spokesperson on water (2014–2015) and local government (2015–2017), and a member of the Māori affairs, primary production, and local government and environment select committees.

=== In government, 2017–2023 ===
During the 2017 general election, Whaitiri retained her Ikaroa-Rāwhiti electorate seat for the Labour Party by a margin of 4,210 votes. Following the 2017 election, Labour formed a coalition government with New Zealand First and the Green Party. Whaitiri was Minister of Customs outside Cabinet. She also served as Associate Minister for Agriculture, Forestry, Local Government and Crown/Māori Relations. Alongside Willie Jackson, she co-chaired the Labour Māori Caucus.

On 30 August 2018, a staff member in Whaitiri's ministerial office alleged she was assaulted by the minister. Whaitiri was removed from her ministerial positions during an investigation and was not restored to them after the investigation found it "probable" that she had bruised the staffer. From July 2019 until the end of the term, she chaired the Justice select committee.

On 4 September 2020 the Governor-General granted Whaitiri retention of the title "The Honourable" in "recognition of her term as a member of the Executive Council".

During the 2020 general election, Whaitiri retained her seat of Ikaroa-Rāwhiti by a margin of 6,045 votes. Following the election, she was reappointed as Minister of Customs and Associate Minister of Agriculture (with responsibility for animal welfare) while being appointed as Minister for Veterans and Associate Minister of Statistics. She additionally became Minister for Food Safety in June 2022 and the lead cyclone recovery minister in Hawke's Bay after Stuart Nash was dismissed from that role in March 2023.

=== Defection from Labour ===
On 3 May 2023, Whaitiri announced that she had officially notified the speaker of the House that she had resigned from the Labour Party and was joining Te Pāti Māori (the Māori Party). She replaced Heather Te-Au Skipworth as Te Pāti Māori's candidate for her electorate at the 2023 New Zealand general election. During her resignation speech, she attributed her decision to defect to her commitment to Māori political activism. Whaitiri's defection was welcomed by Te Pāti Māori co-leader Debbie Ngarewa-Packer and President John Tamihere. Prime Minister Chris Hipkins learned about Whaitiri's defection after landing in London to attend the coronation of King Charles III.

Following her defection, Acting Prime Minister Carmel Sepuloni confirmed that Hipkins had stripped Whaitiri of her ministerial responsibilities on 3 May. Kieran McAnulty became Hawke's Bay cyclone recovery lead minister, Ayesha Verrall temporarily assumed the food safety portfolio, Peeni Henare took over the veterans portfolio, and Damien O'Connor temporarily took over the customs portfolio. Permanent appointments were named on 10 May with Rachel Brooking becoming Minister for Food Safety and Jo Luxton becoming Minister of Customs. Some commentary around Whaitiri's defection, including from Māori development minister Willie Jackson, focused on her apparent disappointment in not receiving a promotion into Cabinet in Hipkins' earlier reshuffles.

Also on 3 May, Speaker of the House Adrian Rurawhe confirmed that Whaitiri would serve until the election as an independent member of Parliament under standing order 35.5, which avoids the waka-jumping provisions of the Electoral (Integrity) Amendment Act 2018 from being invoked. Rurawhe's decision not to invoke the waka-jumping law was criticised by National Party MPs Michael Woodhouse, Chris Bishop, and ACT Party leader David Seymour. On 4 May, Rurawhe distinguished the Electoral Act from parliament's standing orders, stating that he had not received from Whaitiri a letter of resignation from Labour, despite her public statements, with the result that Whaitiri remained a Labour MP under electoral legislation, but was an independent MP for parliamentary purposes under standing orders.

On 10 May 2023, Te Pāti Māori leaders Ngarewa-Packer and Waititi staged a haka to welcome Whaitiri to their political party. Speaker Rurawhe ordered Ngarewa-Packer and Waititi to leave Parliament since they had not received permission from him or other parliamentary parties to hold the haka. Whaitiri stated that she was "joining a party that doesn't censor the voice of wāhine Māori (Māori women) ... I am joining a party that enables the voice of wāhine Māori to be heard, for our people to celebrate being Māori, unashamedly Māori".

Whaitiri stood as the Te Pāti Māori candidate in the Ikaroa-Rāwhiti electorate for the 2023 New Zealand general election and was defeated by Labour's candidate Cushla Tangaere-Manuel by a margin of 2,843 votes.

New Zealand Parliament
| Preceded by Parekura Horomia | Member of Parliament for Ikaroa-Rāwhiti; 2013–2023 | Succeeded by Cushla Tangaere-Manuel |
Political offices
| Preceded by Tim Macindoe | Minister of Customs; 2017–2018; 2020–2023 | Succeeded by Kris Faafoi |
| Preceded by Jenny Salesa | Minister of Customs; 2017–2018; 2020–2023 | Succeeded by Jo Luxton |
