= Hastings Central =

Central Business District of Hastings, New Zealand

- Suburb
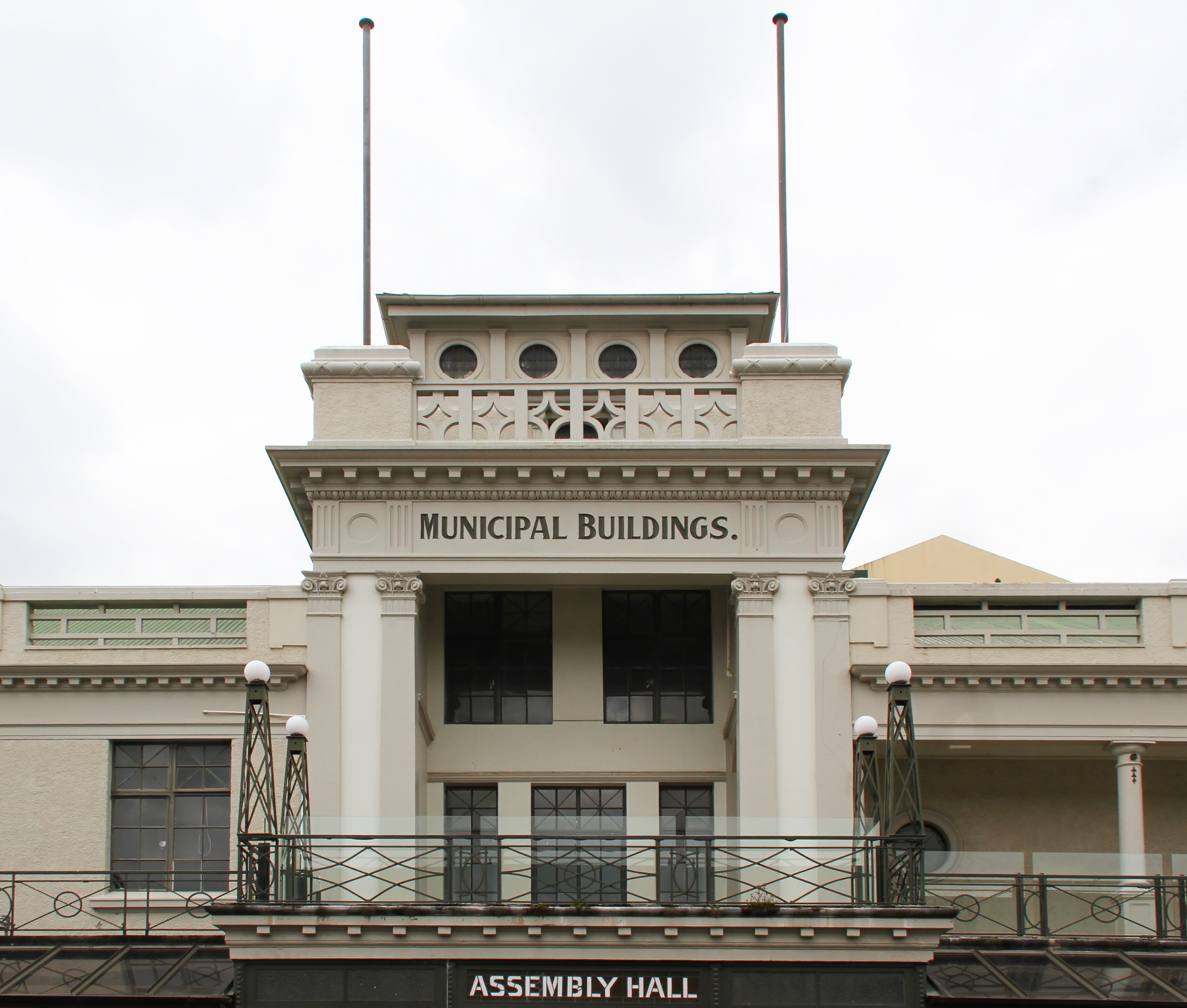
- Municipal Buildings
- Interactive map of Hastings Central
- Coordinates: 39.642031°S 176.843341°E
- Country: New Zealand
- City: Hastings
- Local authority: Hastings District Council
- Electoral ward: Hastings-Havelock North General Ward; Takitimu Māori Ward

Area
  - Land: 142 ha (350 acres)

Population (June 2025)
  - Total: 440
  - Density: 310/km^{2} (800/sq mi)

St Leonards	Mahora
Raureka	Hastings Central	Mayfair
	Akina	Parkvale

Hastings Central is the central suburb and business district of Hastings City, in the Hawke's Bay Region of New Zealand's North Island.

== Demographics ==
Hastings Central covers 1.42 km^{2} (0.55 sq mi) and had an estimated population of 440 as of June 2025, with a population density of 310 people per km^{2}.

Historical population
Year	Pop.	±% p.a.
2006	459	—
2013	366	−3.18%
2018	444	+3.94%
2023	429	−0.68%

Hastings Central had a population of 429 in the 2023 New Zealand census, a decrease of 15 people (−3.4%) since the 2018 census, and an increase of 63 people (17.2%) since the 2013 census. There were 225 males and 201 females in 183 dwellings. 2.1% of people identified as LGBTIQ+. The median age was 34.9 years (compared with 38.1 years nationally). There were 66 people (15.4%) aged under 15 years, 111 (25.9%) aged 15 to 29, 204 (47.6%) aged 30 to 64, and 51 (11.9%) aged 65 or older.

People could identify as more than one ethnicity. The results were 50.3% European (Pākehā); 23.1% Māori; 9.1% Pasifika; 25.9% Asian; 3.5% Middle Eastern, Latin American and African New Zealanders (MELAA); and 1.4% other, which includes people giving their ethnicity as "New Zealander". English was spoken by 93.7%, Māori by 6.3%, Samoan by 2.1%, and other languages by 22.4%. No language could be spoken by 2.8% (e.g. too young to talk). New Zealand Sign Language was known by 0.7%. The percentage of people born overseas was 37.8, compared with 28.8% nationally.

Religious affiliations were 42.0% Christian, 3.5% Hindu, 1.4% Islam, 2.1% Māori religious beliefs, 0.7% Buddhist, 0.7% New Age, and 5.6% other religions. People who answered that they had no religion were 39.2%, and 5.6% of people did not answer the census question.

Of those at least 15 years old, 63 (17.4%) people had a bachelor's or higher degree, 189 (52.1%) had a post-high school certificate or diploma, and 111 (30.6%) people exclusively held high school qualifications. The median income was $35,000, compared with $41,500 nationally. 6 people (1.7%) earned over $100,000 compared to 12.1% nationally. The employment status of those at least 15 was 210 (57.9%) full-time, 42 (11.6%) part-time, and 18 (5.0%) unemployed.

== Economy and amenities ==
The Bay Plaza includes a Kmart store. It was renovated in 2013.

Hastings City Art Gallery opened in 2009.

== Education ==
Hastings Central has two public schools:

- Hastings Central School is a state primary school serving Years 1 to 6, with a roll of 205. It opened in 1875.
- The associated Kōwhai School is a special school, with a roll of 130. It opened in 1975.

There are also three private schools in the area:

- St Joseph's School is a state-integrated Catholic primary school serving Years 1 to 8, with a roll of 292. It opened in 1889.
- St Matthew's Primary School is a state-integrated Anglican primary school serving Years 1 to 8, with a roll of 160. It opened in 1995.
- Taikura Rudolf Steiner School is a state-integrated Year 2-13 school, with a roll of 300. It opened in 1950, but was preceded by a preparatory girls' school, Queenswood, which opened about 1921.

All these schools are co-educational. Rolls are as of October 2025.
