= Coles Joinery Factory =

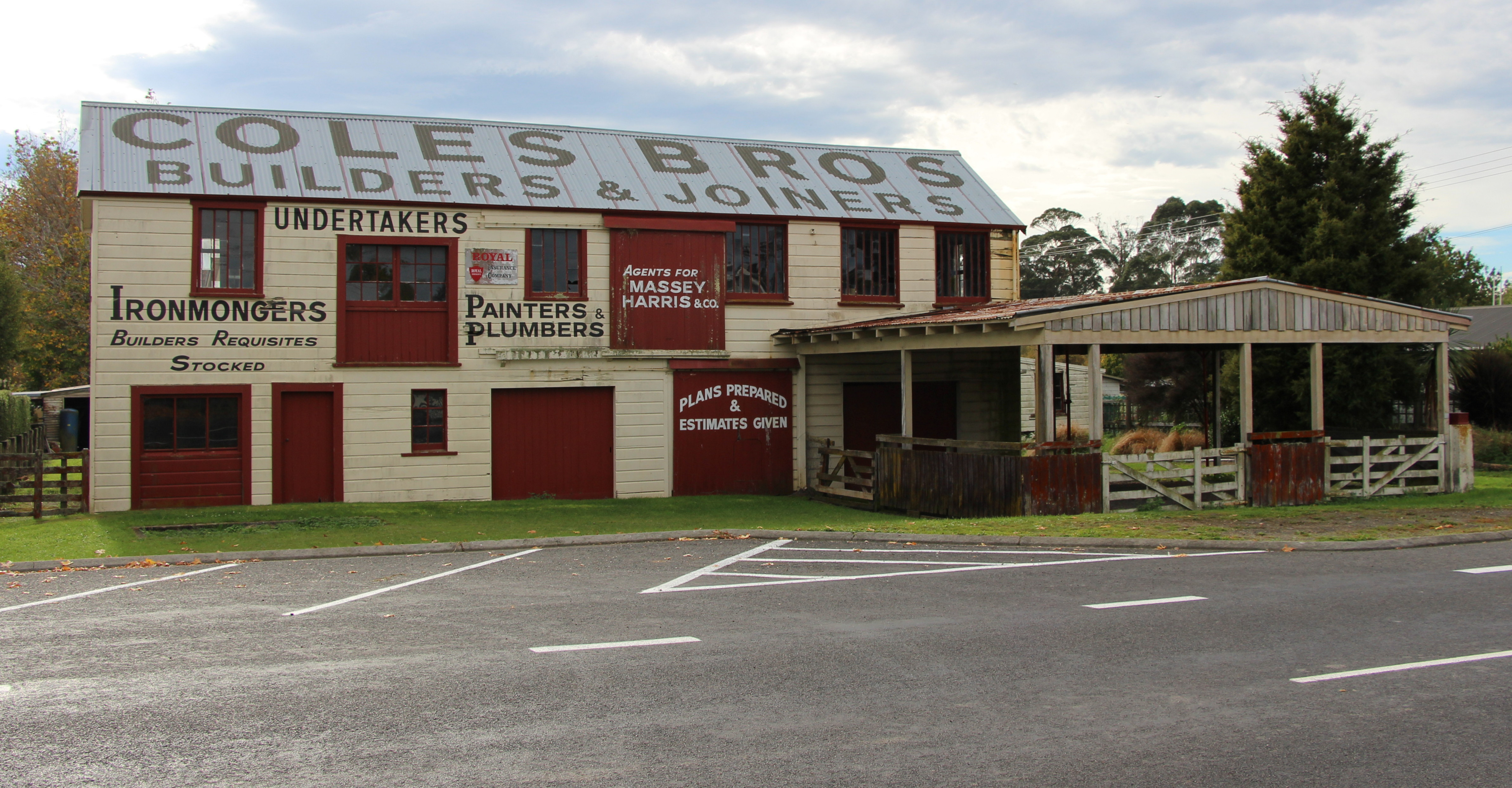
- The factory in 2016

General information
- Type: Factory
- Architectural style: Vernacular
- Location: 54 Bridge Street, Ongaonga, New Zealand
- Named for: Edward Purkis Coles
- Year built: 1878
- Renovated: 2021–2023
- Owner: Ongaonga Historical Society

Website
- https://ongaongamuseum.org/

Heritage New Zealand – Category 1
- Designated: 1 September 1983
- Reference no.: 172

Coles Joinery Factory, also known as the Coles Bros Factory, is a historic former factory in Ongaonga, New Zealand. The factory was the workplace of the Coles' contracting company, which was responsible for the construction of nearly every building in Ongaonga before 1920.

Due to the building being the only extant rural joinery factory in New Zealand it has a category 1 registration with Heritage New Zealand.

== History ==
=== Background ===
Edward Purkis Coles (Note: Also referred to by one source as Edward William Coles) apprenticed as a joiner in Portsea, Portsmouth, England. Henry Hamilton Bridge, the founder of Ongaonga, scouted Coles and he left England with his family for New Zealand in 1877. Coles established a building company in Ongaonga that ended up developing most of the town. Coles' business handled all aspects relating to the erection of a building and during the early 20th century expanded as far as Hastings and Eketahuna.

In 1905 Coles retired and the business was taken over by two of his children — Jack and Frank.

=== Building ===
The first building for the company was a small single storey structure constructed in 1878 by Edward Coles. The building was expanded to keep up with the success of the business, with a second storey and lean-to added onto the factory to give it the current form.

In 1963 the company closed and the building fell into desuetude. The Ongaonga Historical Society attempted to restore the property in the 1980s but was unsuccessful; however, it did manage to get a heritage covenant to protect the building.

In 2016 the owners of the property gifted it to the Ongaonga Historical Society. The historical society reopened the property in 2018 to fundraise for restoration work. Donations and a lottery grant allowed restoration work to begin in 2021, with recycled native timber used to repair the factory. Repainting work included re-adding text that appeared on the building in the 19th century. The restoration work won a regional heritage award.

The factory was reopened in September 2023 and is open to the public as a museum.

== Description ==
The Coles Joinery Factory is a two-storey wooden building divided into five rooms. In front of the building is a covered yard.

The factory contains old machinery that was used by the business such as a mortiser and a pendulum saw that was crafted out of the chassis of a Model T Ford.

The outbuildings of the factory are registered separately as category 2 buildings.
