= Flemington, Hawke's Bay =

Flemington
- Interactive map of Flemington
- Coordinates: 40.1500°S 176.4452°E
- Country: New Zealand
- Region: Hawke's Bay
- Territorial authority: Central Hawke's Bay District
- Ward: Aramoana-Ruahine
- Electorates: Wairarapa; Ikaroa-Rāwhiti (Māori)

Government
  - Territorial Authority: Central Hawke's Bay District Council
  - Regional council: Hawke's Bay Regional Council
  - Mayor of Central Hawke's Bay: Will Foley
  - Wairarapa MP: TBD
  - Ikaroa-Rāwhiti MP: Cushla Tangaere-Manuel

Area
  - Total: 125.71 km^{2} (48.54 sq mi)

Population (2023 Census)
  - Total: 135
  - Density: 1.07/km^{2} (2.78/sq mi)

Flemington is a lightly populated locality in the Hawke's Bay region of New Zealand's North Island. It is located inland, south of Waipukurau and east of Ormondville. Nearby settlements include Whetukura to the west, Te Uri to the south-southwest, and Wanstead to the east.

Flemington began a small European farming community called Boar Hills in 1845. Several stations were established in the following three decades. Flemington District was officially established in 1886.

For the purposes of the New Zealand census, Flemington falls within the area of Elsthorpe-Flemington. This covers a large amount of southern Hawke's Bay south and east of Waipukurau, and it had a population of 2,949 at the 2001 census. This is not reflective of the population of the locality of Flemington itself, as it constitutes only a small part of the statistical region.

Flemington hosts an annual Mud Run every year. It hundreds of participants, many in fancy dress.

== Demographics ==
Flemington locality covers 125.71 km^{2} (48.54 sq mi). The locality is part of the Pōrangahau#Taurekaitai statistical area#Taurekaitai statistical area.

Historical population
Year	Pop.	±% p.a.
2006	117	—
2013	123	+0.72%
2018	135	+1.88%
2023	135	+0.00%

Flemington had a population of 135 in the 2023 New Zealand census, unchanged since the 2018 census, and an increase of 12 people (9.8%) since the 2013 census. There were 69 males and 66 females in 48 dwellings. The median age was 39.8 years (compared with 38.1 years nationally). There were 36 people (26.7%) aged under 15 years, 18 (13.3%) aged 15 to 29, 60 (44.4%) aged 30 to 64, and 21 (15.6%) aged 65 or older.

People could identify as more than one ethnicity. The results were 93.3% European (Pākehā); 20.0% Māori; 2.2% Asian; 2.2% Middle Eastern, Latin American and African New Zealanders (MELAA); and 4.4% other, which includes people giving their ethnicity as "New Zealander". English was spoken by 97.8%, and other languages by 2.2%. No language could be spoken by 2.2% (e.g. too young to talk). The percentage of people born overseas was 6.7, compared with 28.8% nationally.

The sole religious affiliation given was 24.4% Christian. People who answered that they had no religion were 66.7%, and 6.7% of people did not answer the census question.

Of those at least 15 years old, 27 (27.3%) people had a bachelor's or higher degree, 63 (63.6%) had a post-high school certificate or diploma, and 12 (12.1%) people exclusively held high school qualifications. The median income was $46,400, compared with $41,500 nationally. 12 people (12.1%) earned over $100,000 compared to 12.1% nationally. The employment status of those at least 15 was 63 (63.6%) full-time and 24 (24.2%) part-time.

== Education ==
Flemington School is a Year 1–8 co-educational state primary school. It had a roll of 79 as of July 2026.

The school was founded in 1908 before moving its current location in 1918.

Major improvements were made to the school for its centenary in 2008.
