= 2013 Ikaroa-Rāwhiti by-election =

New Zealand by-election

- 29 June 2013
- Turnout: 33.13%
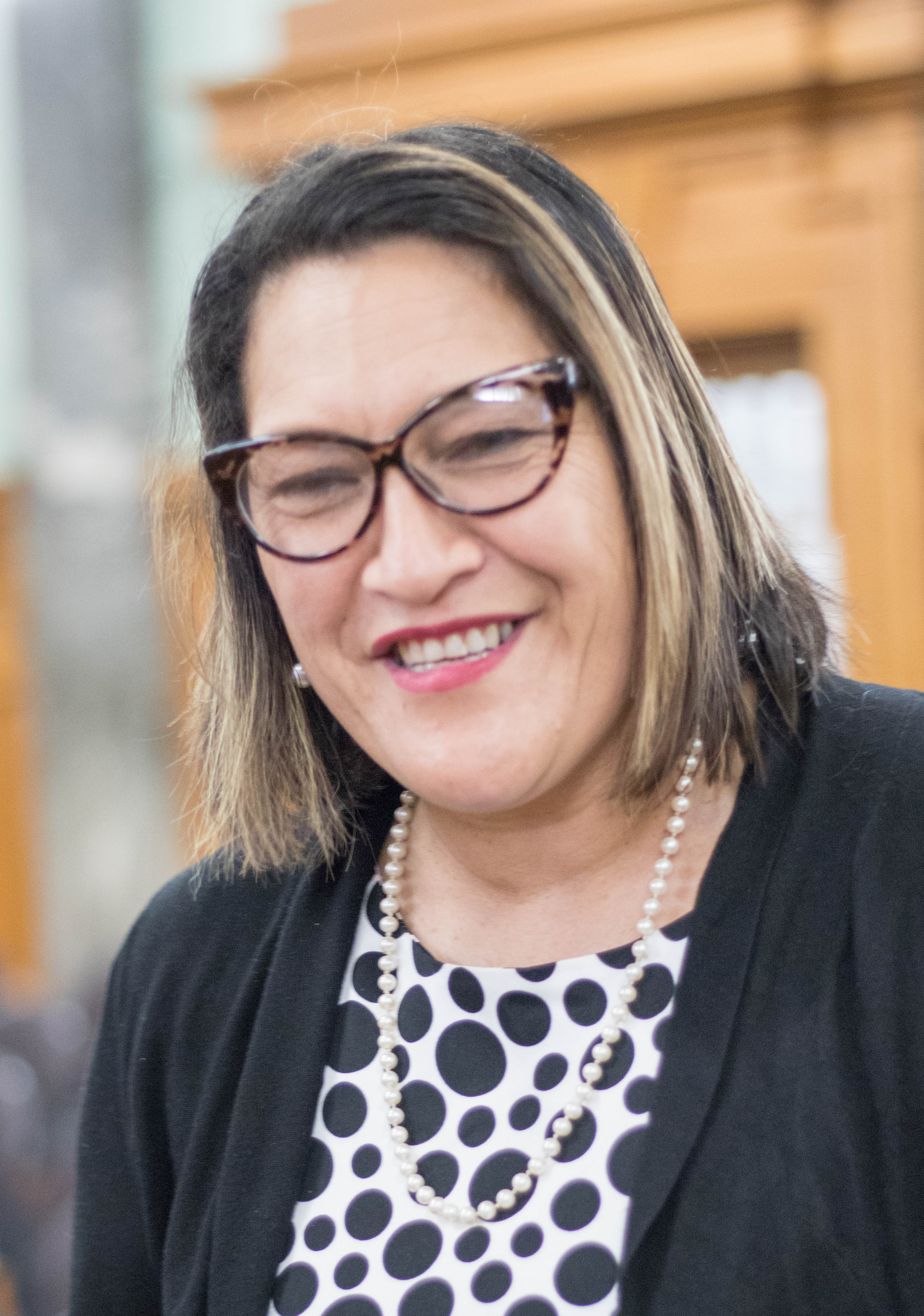

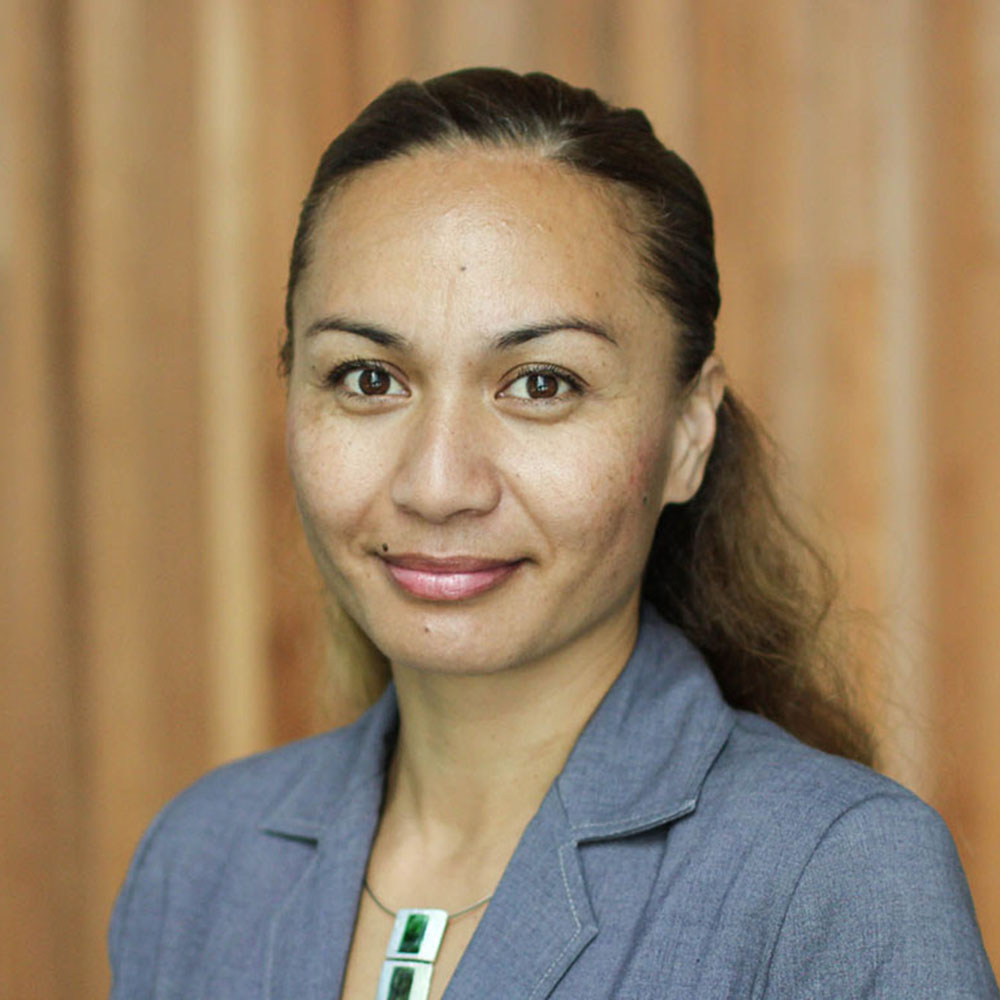
	First party	Second party
Candidate	Meka Whaitiri	Te Hamua Nikora
Party	Labour	Mana
Popular vote	4,590	2,931
Percentage	40.90%	26.12%
Swing	▼19.81pp	▲11.84pp
	Third party	Fourth party
	ma‾-o•ri
Candidate	Na Raihania	Marama Davidson
Party	Māori Party	Green
Popular vote	2,229	1,251
Percentage	19.86%	11.15%
Swing	▼3.24pp	▲11.15pp
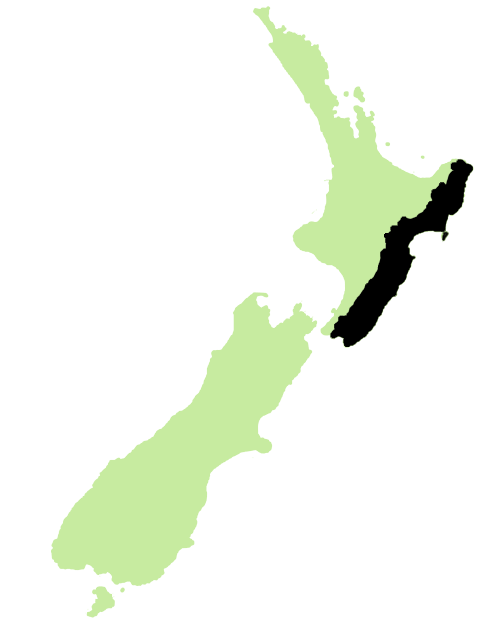
MP before election
Parekura Horomia
Labour
Elected MP
Meka Whaitiri
Labour

A by-election was held in the New Zealand electorate of Ikaroa-Rāwhiti on 29 June 2013. The seat was vacated by the death of incumbent member of parliament Parekura Horomia two months earlier, who had represented the electorate for the Labour Party since its inception for the 1999 election. The election was won by Labour's Meka Whaitiri.

== Date ==
Horomia died on 29 April 2013. Once the Registrar of Birth and Deaths receives the registration of death for a sitting MP, they must inform the Speaker of the House within 12 hours, and then the Speaker must publish, without delay, the notice of vacancy of the seat in the New Zealand Gazette. The notice was published in the Gazette on 8 May 2013.

The Governor-General must issue the writ for a by-election to fill a vacant electorate seat within 21 days of the Gazette notice (i.e. 29 May 2013). The writ must be returned with the successful candidate within 50 days of its issue, which means the writ must be returned, and therefore the election must have taken place, by 18 July 2013. As polling day must be a Saturday, and two weeks are generally required for the counting of special votes, the last possible polling day is therefore Saturday 29 June 2013.

After the notice of vacancy was published, Prime Minister John Key announced the by-election date has been set as Saturday 29 June 2013.

== Candidates ==
Seven candidates were contesting the by-election. It was won by Meka Whaitiri of the Labour Party.

The following candidates contested the election:

- The Labour Party selected Meka Whaitiri, CEO of Ngāti Kahungunu. Other candidates who had sought nomination were Ngāti Kahungunu board member Hayden Hape, health specialist Molly Keelen-Para, Hastings district councillor Henare O'Keefe, development advisor Tāmati Olsen, and broadcaster Shane Taurima.
- The Māori Party selected Na Raihania, who contested the same seat for them in the last general election. Two other candidates, Te Rangihau Gilbert and Mark Kopua, had also sought the nomination.
- The Mana Party selected Te Hamua Nikora, a television presenter, as its candidate for the by-election. The other person who had been considered for nomination was kōhanga reo manager Leon Hawea.
- The Green Party selected environmentalist and human rights advocate Marama Davidson.
- The Aotearoa Legalise Cannabis Party selected lawyer and cannabis law reform advocate Michael Appleby.
- Two independents contested the by-election: Adam Holland and Maurice Wairau.

== Impact ==
TV3 political editor Patrick Gower reported two days before the election that, according to sources within the Labour caucus, Labour leader David Shearer has been put on notice and given two months to achieve better poll results, or else face a leadership challenge. This followed recent polls for the next general election that showed Labour in the low 30 percent, (e.g. the Herald-DigiPoll from mid-June that showed Labour at 30.9%, with a margin of error of 3.6%.), although the party was well up on its 2011 general election result of 27.48 percent. Earlier in the week, Shearer had downplayed Labour's hopes for winning the by-election, despite the party having held the electorate since its inception for the 1999 election and expected by mainstream media to again win the by-election.

Matt McCarten of the Mana Party claimed that sources within the Māori Party had told him that if Mana came ahead of their party, they would make amends, and commentators agreed that a strong result for Mana away from their Northland base would spell the end to the Māori Party's claim to be independent political voice for tangata whenua.

Right-wing political blogger David Farrar called the poll result "a good victory for Labour", and commented that Whaitiri "could be one of the better Labour MPs".

== Results ==
The following table shows the final results of the by-election:

2013 Ikaroa-Rāwhiti by-election
Notes: Blue background denotes the winner of the by-election. Pink background denotes a candidate elected from their party list prior to the by-election. Yellow background denotes the winner of the by-election, who was a list MP prior to the by-election. A ✓ or ✗ denotes status of any incumbent, win or lose respectively.
Party	Candidate	Votes	%	±%
Labour	Meka Whaitiri	4,590	40.90	-19.81
Mana Party	Te Hamua Nikora	2,931	26.12	+11.84
Māori Party	Na Raihania	2,229	19.86	−3.24
Green	Marama Davidson	1,251	11.15	+11.15
Legalise Cannabis	Michael Appleby	176	1.57	+1.57
Independent	Maurice Wairau	30	0.27	−1.64
Independent	Adam Holland	15	0.13	+0.13
Total Valid votes		11,222		
Informal votes		46	0.41	-4.93
Turnout		11,268	33.13	−22.46
Registered electors		34,008		
Labour hold	Majority	1,659	14.78	-22.83
