= Tamatea High School =

Co-ed secondary school in Napier, New Zealand

Location
- Freyberg Avenue, Tamatea, Napier; 39.5183°S 176.8717°E

Information
- Type: Co-educational state secondary (years 9–13)
- Motto: "Growing Good People for a Changing World"
- Established: 1975
- Ministry of Education Institution no.: 218
- Principal: Jesse Te Weehi
- Enrolment: 346 (July 2026)
- Socio-economic decile: 3H
- Website: tamatea.school.nz

Tamatea High School is a co-educational state secondary school in Tamatea, a suburb of Napier, New Zealand, that opened in 1975.

== History ==
The school was opened in 1975. It was one of a number of schools that received a hoax bomb threat in 2016. It closed temporarily in 2020 when flooding affected a number of schools in the area. An incident outside the school in 2024 led to a temporary lockdown. In 2025, the Ministry of Education cut a rural school bus route, forcing students to hitchhike to school from 45 km away.

== Enrolment ==
The school roll has approximately 310 boys and girls. The classes are typically around 20–25 students and smaller in the senior school. The school population is approximately 55% Māori, 38% Pākehā with the rest of the students being Pasifika and Asian.

== Academics ==
Typical student pathways include university, further training through the programmes at the Eastern Institute of Technology (EIT), or direct entry to employment. Student learning programmes are informed by their leaving goals.

== Activities ==
In 2022, students transformed an unused football field into a native forest by planting 2,600 trees as part of the school's Matariki Ngahere Legacy Project. Supported by a grant, the project served as a living memorial to Heitia and Marg Hiha. Students raised more than $26,000 toward the cost.

Sports that the school competes in include basketball, crew and rugby.

== Principals ==
- Jesse Te Weehi (2024, term 2 – present), previously deputy principal at Te Aute College, and head of Māori at Napier Boys' High School
- Robin Fabish (Sept 2015 – end of term 1, 2024)
- Nicola Ngarewa (2010 – end of term 1, 2015)
- Chris Nielson (2006–2010)
- J S Paterson (2001–2006)
- R Roscoe (1995–2001)
- Bali Haque (1992–1995 – left partway through first term to take up position at Rosehill College, Auckland)
- W Dimery (1988–1991)
- J Ryan (1975–1988)
