= Tamatea, Napier =

Suburb of Napier, New Zealand

Tamatea
- Suburb
- Interactive map of Tamatea
- Coordinates: 39°30′40″S 176°52′10″E
- Country: New Zealand
- City: Napier
- Local authority: Napier City Council
- Electoral ward: Onekawa-Tamatea Ward
- Established: 1969

Area
  - Land: 193 ha (480 acres)

Population (June 2025)
  - Total: 5,730
  - Density: 2,970/km^{2} (7,690/sq mi)

Poraiti	Poraiti	Onekawa
	Tamatea	Pirimai
Greenmeadows	Greenmeadows	Greenmeadows

Tamatea is a suburb in the west of the city of Napier, in the Hawke's Bay region of New Zealand's North Island. Development of the suburb began in 1969 and it was named in honour of Tamatea-pōkai-whenua, an ancestor of the Ngāti Kahungunu iwi (tribe) of Hawke's Bay, that year.

== Demographics ==
Tamatea covers 1.93 km^{2} (0.75 sq mi) and had an estimated population of 5,730 as of June 2025, with a population density of 2,969 people per km^{2}.

Historical population
Year	Pop.	±% p.a.
2006	5,121	—
2013	5,040	−0.23%
2018	5,412	+1.43%
2023	5,562	+0.55%

Tamatea had a population of 5,562 in the 2023 New Zealand census, an increase of 150 people (2.8%) since the 2018 census, and an increase of 522 people (10.4%) since the 2013 census. There were 2,697 males, 2,853 females, and 12 people of other genders in 2,019 dwellings. 2.6% of people identified as LGBTIQ+. The median age was 35.9 years (compared with 38.1 years nationally). There were 1,179 people (21.2%) aged under 15 years, 1,098 (19.7%) aged 15 to 29, 2,322 (41.7%) aged 30 to 64, and 957 (17.2%) aged 65 or older.

People could identify as more than one ethnicity. The results were 74.5% European (Pākehā); 30.4% Māori; 4.5% Pasifika; 7.4% Asian; 0.9% Middle Eastern, Latin American and African New Zealanders (MELAA); and 2.9% other, which includes people giving their ethnicity as "New Zealander". English was spoken by 96.7%, Māori by 6.1%, Samoan by 1.2%, and other languages by 8.3%. No language could be spoken by 2.2% (e.g. too young to talk). New Zealand Sign Language was known by 0.6%. The percentage of people born overseas was 16.4, compared with 28.8% nationally.

Religious affiliations were 28.4% Christian, 0.5% Hindu, 0.5% Islam, 3.2% Māori religious beliefs, 0.8% Buddhist, 0.5% New Age, and 1.5% other religions. People who answered that they had no religion were 57.6%, and 7.0% of people did not answer the census question.

Of those at least 15 years old, 648 (14.8%) people had a bachelor's or higher degree, 2,568 (58.6%) had a post-high school certificate or diploma, and 1,173 (26.8%) people exclusively held high school qualifications. The median income was $39,100, compared with $41,500 nationally. 228 people (5.2%) earned over $100,000 compared to 12.1% nationally. The employment status of those at least 15 was 2,271 (51.8%) full-time, 510 (11.6%) part-time, and 129 (2.9%) unemployed.

Individual statistical areas
Name	Area (km^{2})	Population	Density (per km^{2})	Dwellings	Median age	Median income
Tamatea West	0.63	2,043	3,243	744	37.4 years	$38,400
Tamatea North	0.66	1,734	2,677	621	34.4 years	$39,300
Tamatea East	0.63	1,785	1,785	657	35.4 years	$39,600
New Zealand					38.1 years	$41,500

== Education ==
Porritt School is a Year 1–6 state primary school, with a roll of 324. It opened in 1975.

Tamatea School is a Year 1–6 state primary school, with a roll of 146. The school was open by 1976.

Tamatea Intermediate is a Year 7–8 state intermediate school, with a roll of 367. It was open by 1975.

Tamatea High School is a state secondary school, with a roll of 346. It opened in 1975.

All these schools are co-educational. Rolls are as of July 2026.
