= Michael Appleby (politician) =

New Zealand politician

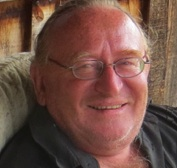

Leader of the Aotearoa Legalise Cannabis Party
- Incumbent
- Assumed office c. July 2018 Serving with Maki Herbert
- Preceded by: Jeff Lye
- In office 1996 – 14 October 2013
- Succeeded by: Julian Crawford

Personal details
- Party: Aotearoa Legalise Cannabis Party
- Occupation: Lawyer, cannabis activist

Michael George Appleby is a politician, cannabis activist, and lawyer based in Wellington, New Zealand.

== Background ==
Appleby is a human rights lawyer with a B.A. in politics and English, and an M.A. in Administrative Law, Taxation and Trusts, and Constitutional Law. He has taught law at various universities around New Zealand and Australia.

== Political career ==
In addition to his legal career, Appleby was the leader of the Aotearoa Legalise Cannabis Party (ALCP) from 1996 until 2013. This small political party is dedicated to the relaxation or repeal of laws against the use of cannabis and has never been represented in Parliament. In 1998 he was elected a member of the Terawhiti Licensing Trust as an ALCP candidate.

Appleby has stood as his party's candidate in the Wellington Central electorate since its inception in 1996. His best result was in the 1999 election where he gained third place, aided by the fact that most major candidates had pulled out to support either incumbent Richard Prebble or challenger Marian Hobbs. He came fifth in the 2011 election. He later represented the Aotearoa Legalise Cannabis Party in the 2013 Ikaroa-Rāwhiti by-election.

Appleby stood unsuccessfully for the Wellington City Council in October 2004. He ran again for the Wellington City Council in the October 2013 local government elections, where he placed ninth in the Lambton Ward and was not elected.

During the 2020 New Zealand general election, Appleby contested Wellington Central for the Aotearoa Legalise Cannabis Party, gaining 240 votes.

During the 2023 New Zealand general election, Appleby stood as a candidate for the Aotearoa Legalise Cannabis Party in Wellington Central. He came sixth place, gaining only 418 votes.

During the 2026 New Zealand general election, Appelby stood as a candidate for the Aotearoa Legalise Cannabis Party in Wellington North. Based on preliminary results, Appelby came seventh place, receiving 183 votes. The ALCP received 4,829 party votes (0.19%), below the five percent threshold needed to enter Parliament.
