= Taikura Rudolf Steiner School =

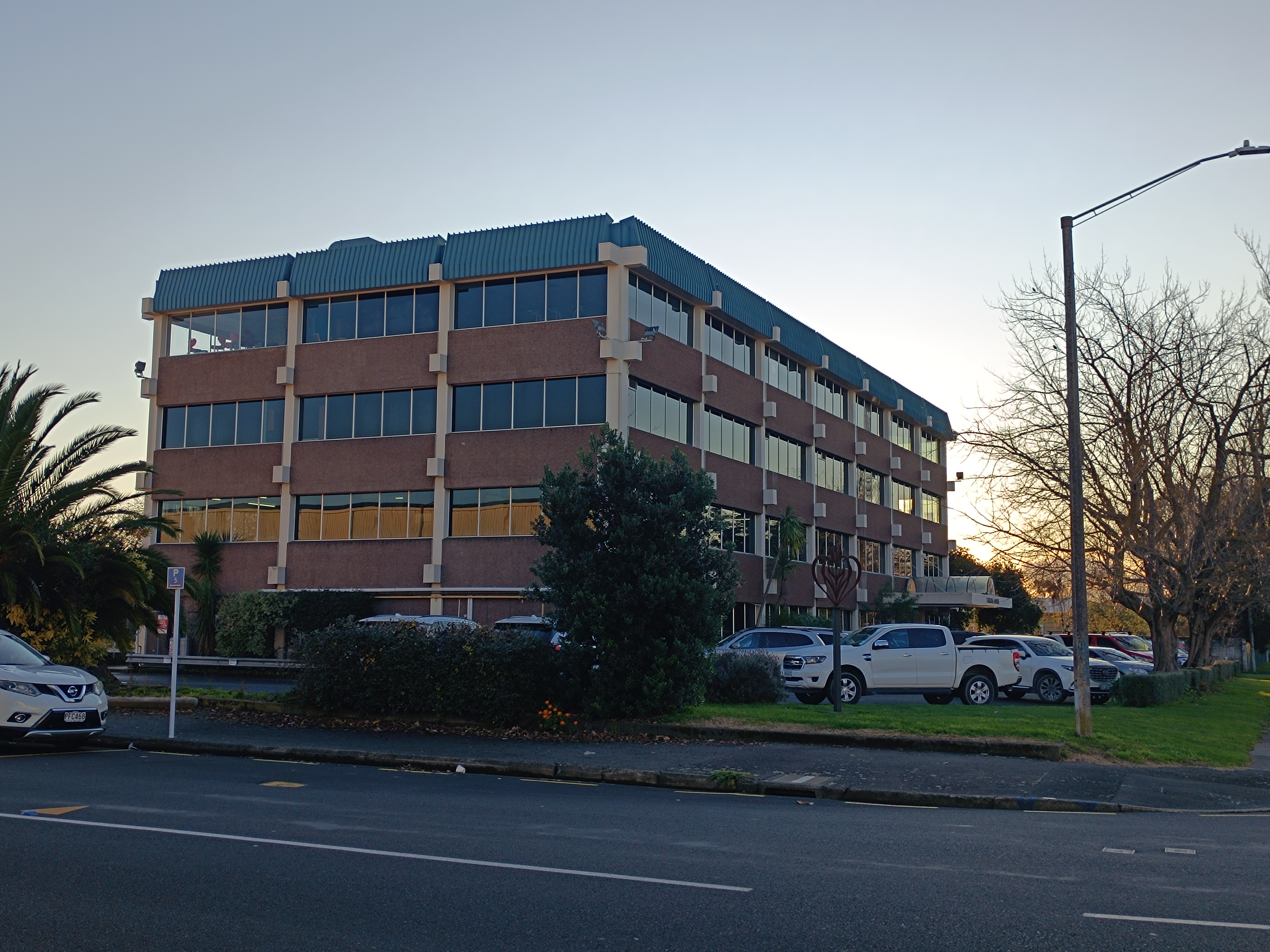
- Taikura House

Location
- 505 Nelson Street North, Hastings, New Zealand; 39°38′09″S 176°50′45″E

Information
- Type: Co-ed state integrated (Years 1–13)
- Motto: To help each and every student progress towards becoming free, responsible and caring individuals able to impart purpose and direction in their lives and contribute in manifold, as well as unique, ways to society
- Established: 1950
- Ministry of Education Institution no.: 231
- Principal: Pippa Caccioppoli
- Enrolment: 281 (July 2026)
- Socio-economic decile: 6N
- Website: taikura.school.nz

Taikura Rudolf Steiner School is a co-educational state integrated composite school for students in Years 1 to 13, located in Hastings, New Zealand.

== Alumni ==
- Caroline Evers-Swindell, gold-medal winning rower
- Georgina Evers-Swindell, gold-medal winning rower
- Benjamin Crellin, comedian
