= Poraiti =

Suburb of Napier, New Zealand

- Suburb
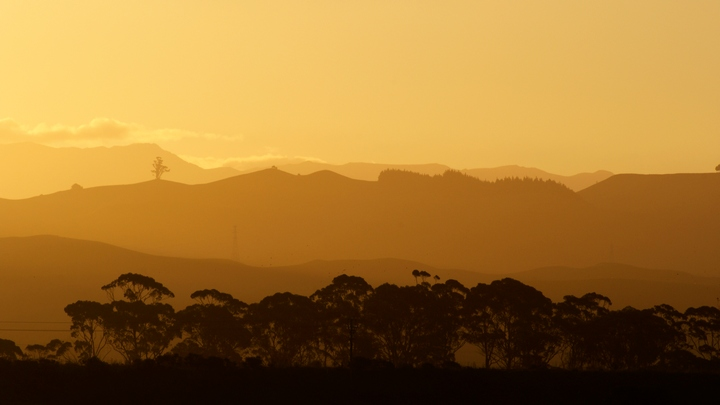
- Sunset over Poraiti Hills
- Interactive map of Poraiti
- Coordinates: 39.504273°S 176.843913°E
- Country: New Zealand
- City: Napier
- Local authority: Napier City Council
- Electoral ward: Taradale Ward

Area
  - Land: 1,766 ha (4,360 acres)

Population (June 2025)
  - Total: 2,450
  - Density: 139/km^{2} (359/sq mi)

Puketapu	Bay View	Westshore
	Poraiti	Onekawa
	Taradale	Tamatea

Poraiti is a suburb on the western outskirts of the city of Napier, in the Hawke's Bay region of New Zealand's eastern North Island. For a long time it was a semi-rural locality on low hills, but has now been extended to include a new residential subdivision developed on the plain in the 2000s.

== History ==
Te Poraiti, also known as Pa Poto, was a Māori pā belonging to Ngāti Hinepare on a small headland near the shore of Ahuriri Lagoon. In the 19th century, chiefs Rawiri Tareahi and his son Porokoru Mapu lived there.

For a long period of modern history Poraiti was a semi-rural locality on low hills west of Napier. It was part of Hawke's Bay County until the 1989 New Zealand local government reforms, when it became part of Napier City.

When a new residential subdivision was developed on the former Lagoon Farm, west of Tamatea, in the 2000s, there was a debate over whether it should be named Parklands or Orotu. Napier City Council settled the debate in 2008 by including the subdivision in Poraiti. That area is now known as Poraiti Flat, while the old Poraiti has become known as Poraiti Hills.

== Demographics ==
Poraiti covers 17.66 km^{2} (6.82 sq mi) and had an estimated population of 2,450 as of June 2025, with a population density of 139 people per km^{2}.

Historical population
Year	Pop.	±% p.a.
2006	657	—
2013	1,461	+12.09%
2018	2,013	+6.62%
2023	2,349	+3.14%

Poraiti had a population of 2,349 in the 2023 New Zealand census, an increase of 336 people (16.7%) since the 2018 census, and an increase of 888 people (60.8%) since the 2013 census. There were 1,152 males, 1,188 females, and 3 people of other genders in 906 dwellings. 1.9% of people identified as LGBTIQ+. The median age was 51.7 years (compared with 38.1 years nationally). There were 327 people (13.9%) aged under 15 years, 297 (12.6%) aged 15 to 29, 1,065 (45.3%) aged 30 to 64, and 660 (28.1%) aged 65 or older.

People could identify as more than one ethnicity. The results were 88.9% European (Pākehā); 9.3% Māori; 1.1% Pasifika; 7.0% Asian; 1.0% Middle Eastern, Latin American and African New Zealanders (MELAA); and 2.8% other, which includes people giving their ethnicity as "New Zealander". English was spoken by 96.3%, Māori by 1.3%, Samoan by 0.1%, and other languages by 8.6%. No language could be spoken by 1.5% (e.g. too young to talk). New Zealand Sign Language was known by 0.9%. The percentage of people born overseas was 18.6, compared with 28.8% nationally.

Religious affiliations were 36.5% Christian, 0.3% Hindu, 0.1% Islam, 0.4% Māori religious beliefs, 1.9% Buddhist, 0.4% New Age, 0.1% Jewish, and 1.1% other religions. People who answered that they had no religion were 51.7%, and 7.5% of people did not answer the census question.

Of those at least 15 years old, 486 (24.0%) people had a bachelor's or higher degree, 1,113 (55.0%) had a post-high school certificate or diploma, and 426 (21.1%) people exclusively held high school qualifications. The median income was $45,500, compared with $41,500 nationally. 342 people (16.9%) earned over $100,000 compared to 12.1% nationally. The employment status of those at least 15 was 948 (46.9%) full-time, 270 (13.4%) part-time, and 27 (1.3%) unemployed.

Individual statistical areas
Name	Area (km^{2})	Population	Density (per km^{2})	Dwellings	Median age	Median income
Poraiti Hills	10.58	867	82	309	47.0 years	$47,500
Poraiti Flat	7.08	1,482	209	600	53.7 years	$44,100
New Zealand					38.1 years	$41,500

== Education ==
Hōhepa School is a private special needs composite school, with a roll of 30 as of July 2025. It opened in 1957.
