= Ikaroa-Rāwhiti =

Coordinates: 39.4167°S 176.8167°E

- Single-member Māori constituency for the New Zealand House of Representatives
- Formation: 1999
- Region: Gisborne; Hawke's Bay; Manawatū-Whanganui; Wellington
- Character: Urban and rural
- Term: 3 years

Member for Ikaroa-Rāwhiti
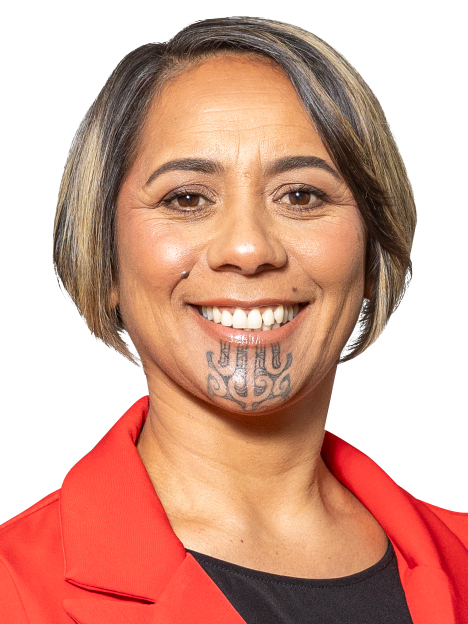
- Cushla Tangaere-Manuel since 14 October 2023
- Party: Labour
- Previous MP: Meka Whaitiri (Te Pāti Māori)
Party vote distribution

Ikaroa-Rāwhiti is a New Zealand parliamentary Māori electorate that was formed for the 1999 election. It covers the eastern North Island from East Cape south through Hawke's Bay Region, Tararua District and the Wairarapa Region to Wainuiomata and most of the Hutt Valley, but not southern Lower Hutt or Wellington City.

It was held by Parekura Horomia of the Labour Party from 1999 until his death in 2013. A by-election to replace him was held on 29 June 2013. Meka Whaitiri held the seat for ten years under the Labour Party before changing political allegiances. Whaitiri left the Labour Party in early May 2023 and joined Te Pāti Māori. According to a ruling by the speaker of the House, Whaitiri continued to represent the electorate, not on behalf of a party, but as an independent. Labour's Cushla Tangaere-Manuel became MP in 2023.

== Population centres ==
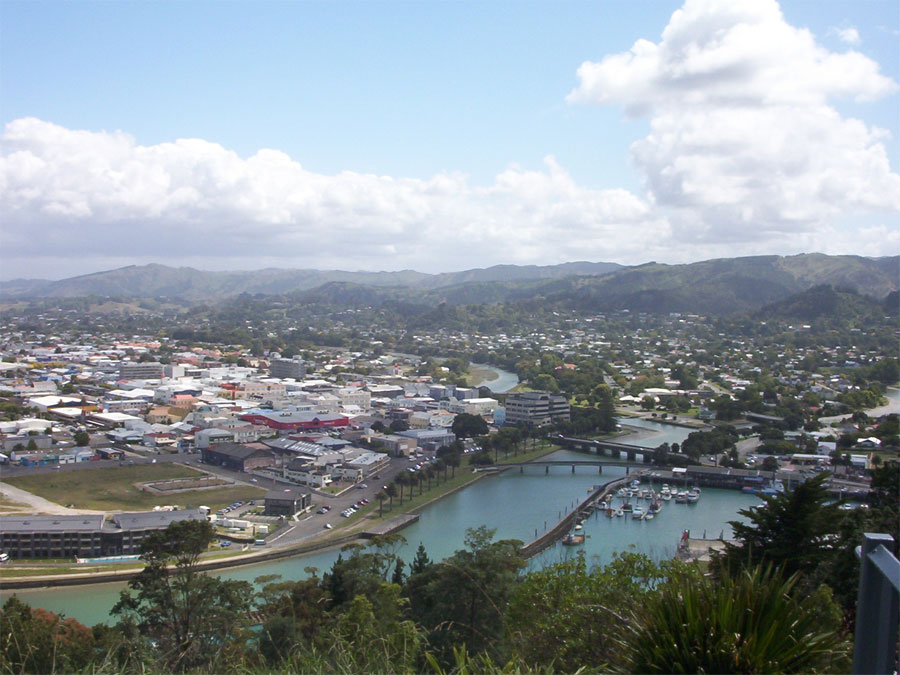
Gisborne

As the electorate's name suggests (ika "fish", roa "long", rāwhiti "east"), Ikaroa-Rāwhiti is a long electorate covering the eastern North Island (Te Ika-a-Māui).

The electorate includes the following population centres (from north to south):

- Gisborne
- Wairoa
- Napier
- Hastings
- Central Hawke's Bay
- Tararua District
- Masterton and the Wairarapa district
- Wellington – Upper Hutt and Lower Hutt—northern suburbs (north of Fairway Drive and Daysh Street), western hills (excluding Korokoro), and Wainuiomata

In the 2013/14 redistribution, a minor boundary adjustment was undertaken. A small area, including the village of Tuai, was transferred to the Waiariki electorate. In the 2025 redistribution, the Lower Hutt suburbs of Petone and Eastbourne would be transferred to the electorate from Te Tai Tonga.

== Tribal areas ==
The electorate includes the following tribal areas:

- Ngāti Porou – Potikirua ki Te Toka-a-Taiau (Gisborne)
- Te Aitanga-a-Māhaki – Gisborne and Poverty Bay
- Rongowhakaata – Poverty Bay
- Ngāi Tāmanuhiri – Poverty Bay
- Ngāti Kahungunu – Wairoa, Hawke's Bay, Hastings, Napier and Wairarapa
- Ngāti Toa – Hutt Valley, and northern Lower Hutt
- Taranaki Whānui – Hutt Valley, and northern Lower Hutt
- Te Atiawa – Hutt Valley, and northern Lower Hutt

== History ==
The electorate was formed for the 1999 election, which was won by Parekura Horomia of the Labour Party. Horomia's death on 29 April 2013 triggered a by-election, which was held on 29 June and won by Labour's Meka Whaitiri. The Māori Party had nominated tribal leader Na Rongowhakaata Raihania. and the Mana Party had selected television presenter Te Hamua Nikora as its candidate. The Green Party had selected environmentalist and human rights advocate Marama Davidson. Further candidates had been Michael Appleby for the Aotearoa Legalise Cannabis Party plus two independent candidates. Based on preliminary results, Whaitiri more than tripled her 2014 election night majority over Mana's Nikora. Also based on preliminary results, Marama Fox of the Māori Party was elected to Parliament as a list MP.

=== Members of Parliament ===
Key

Labour Independent

Election	Winner
1999 election	Parekura Horomia
2002 election	Parekura Horomia
2005 election	Parekura Horomia
2008 election	Parekura Horomia
2011 election	Parekura Horomia
2013 by-election	Meka Whaitiri
2014 election	Meka Whaitiri
2017 election	Meka Whaitiri
2020 election	Meka Whaitiri
2023 election	Cushla Tangaere-Manuel
2026 election	Cushla Tangaere-Manuel

=== List MPs ===
Members of Parliament elected from party lists in elections where that person also unsuccessfully contested Ikaroa-Rāwhiti. Unless otherwise stated, all MPs terms began and ended at general elections.

Māori Party Green

Election	Winner
2014 election	Marama Fox
2020 election	Elizabeth Kerekere

== Election results ==
=== 2026 election ===
The next election will be held on 7 November 2026. Candidates for Ikaroa-Rāwhiti are listed at Candidates in the 2026 New Zealand general election by electorate § Ikaroa-Rāwhiti. Official results will be available after 27 November 2026.

=== 2023 election ===
2023 general election: Ikaroa-Rāwhiti
Notes:	Blue background denotes the winner of the electorate vote. Pink background denotes a candidate elected from their party list. Yellow background denotes an electorate win by a list member, or other incumbent. A ✓ or ✗ denotes status of any incumbent, win or lose respectively.						
Party	Candidate	Votes	%	±%	Party votes	%	±%
Labour	Cushla Tangaere-Manuel	13,747	52.63	–2.94	14,775	54.79	–12.54
Te Pāti Māori	✗ Meka Whaitiri	10,873	41.63	+10.69	6,722	24.92	+12.76
Vision NZ	Ata Tuhakaraina	787	3.01	–			
Green					1,802	6.68	–1.79
National					964	3.69	+1.36
NZ First					927	3.54	–0.22
Legalise Cannabis					280	1.03	–0.88
NZ Loyal					257	0.95	–
ACT					209	0.77	–0.11
NewZeal					180	0.66	+0.03
Freedoms NZ					169	0.62	–
Opportunities					138	0.51	–0.23
Animal Justice					26	0.09	–
DemocracyNZ					26	0.09	–
New Conservatives					18	0.06	–0.32
Women's Rights					18	0.06	–
Leighton Baker Party					9	0.03	–
New Nation					9	0.03	–
Informal votes		711			436		
Total valid votes		26,118			26,965		
Labour hold	Majority	2,874	11.00	–12.94			

=== 2020 election ===
2020 general election: Ikaroa-Rāwhiti
Notes:	Blue background denotes the winner of the electorate vote. Pink background denotes a candidate elected from their party list. Yellow background denotes an electorate win by a list member, or other incumbent. A ✓ or ✗ denotes status of any incumbent, win or lose respectively.						
Party	Candidate	Votes	%	±%	Party votes	%	±%
Labour	✓ Meka Whaitiri	13,642	55.57	+0.44	17,111	67.33	+1.80
Māori Party	Heather Te Au-Skipworth	7,597	30.94	−5.28	3,089	12.16	−1.00
Green	Elizabeth Kerekere	2,080	8.47	−0.17	1,647	6.48	+1.56
Advance NZ	Waitangi Kupenga	791	3.22	—	638	2.51	—
New Conservative	Melissa Lee-Ann Hill	245	1.00	—	96	0.38	+0.32
Outdoors	Kelly Thurston	196	0.80	—	44	0.17	+0.13
NZ First					956	3.76	−3.49
National					593	2.33	−2.54
Legalise Cannabis					486	1.91	+0.99
ACT					223	0.88	+0.75
Opportunities					189	0.74	−1.27
ONE					164	0.63	—
Vision NZ					161	0.63	—
Sustainable NZ					6	0.02	—
TEA					6	0.02	—
Social Credit					3	0.01	±0.00
Heartland					0	0.00	—
Informal votes		820			472		
Total valid votes		25,371			25,884		
Labour hold	Majority	6,075	23.94	−25.90			

=== 2017 election ===
2017 general election: Ikaroa-Rawhiti
Notes:	Blue background denotes the winner of the electorate vote. Pink background denotes a candidate elected from their party list. Yellow background denotes an electorate win by a list member, or other incumbent. A ✓ or ✗ denotes status of any incumbent, win or lose respectively.						
Party	Candidate	Votes	%	±%	Party votes	%	±%
Labour	✓ Meka Whaitiri	12,274	53.68	+8.5	15,233	64.7	+17.32
Māori Party	Marama Fox	8,064	35.27	+17.44	3,058	13.0	+0.81
Green	Elizabeth Kerekere	1,924	8.41	−1.38	1,143	4.86	−5.42
NZ First					1,685	7.16	−4.09
National					1,131	4.8	−0.57
Opportunities					468	1.99	+1.99
Legalise Cannabis					214	0.91	−0.5
Mana					198	0.84	−8.88 (Note: Compared to Internet Mana party vote)
ACT					30	0.13	+0.2
Ban 1080					28	0.12	+0.1
People's Party					26	0.11	+0.11
Conservative					15	0.06	−0.53
Outdoors					9	0.04	+0.04
Internet					5	0.02	−9.70 (Note: Compared to Internet Mana party vote)
Democrats					1	0	−0.01
United Future					1	0	−0.03
Informal votes		603			285		
Total valid votes		22,865			23,530		
Labour hold	Majority	4,210	18.41	−3.23			

=== 2014 election ===
2014 general election: Ikaroa-Rāwhiti
Notes:	Blue background denotes the winner of the electorate vote. Pink background denotes a candidate elected from their party list. Yellow background denotes an electorate win by a list member, or other incumbent. A ✓ or ✗ denotes status of any incumbent, win or lose respectively.						
Party	Candidate	Votes	%	±%	Party votes	%	±%
Labour	✓ Meka Whaitiri	9,753	45.18	+4.28 (Note: Change in vote percentage for candidates is relative to the 2013 by-election)	10,489	47.38	−2.20
Mana	Te Hāmua Nikora	5,080	23.53	-2.59			
Māori Party	Marama Fox	3,848	17.83	−2.03	2,699	12.19	−1.79
Green	Henare Kani	2,114	9.79	−1.36	2,275	10.28	+0.92
Independent	Cathryn Eden	215	1.00	+1.00			
Expatriate Party	Vicky Rose	70	0.32	+0.32			
NZ First					2,490	11.25	−2.95
Internet Mana					2,152	9.72	+0.12 (Note: Compared to Mana Movement party vote)
National					1,189	5.37	−0.60
Legalise Cannabis					313	1.41	−0.05
Conservative					130	0.59	+0.19
Ban 1080					25	0.11	+0.11
ACT					24	0.11	+0.11
Independent Coalition					11	0.05	+0.05
United Future					6	0.03	−0.05
Focus					4	0.02	+0.02
Democrats					2	0.01	0.00
Civilian					2	0.01	+0.01
Informal votes		506			325		
Total valid votes		21,586			22,136		
Labour hold	Majority	4,673	21.64	−16.97			

=== 2013 by-election ===
The following table shows the final results of the by-election:

2013 Ikaroa-Rāwhiti by-election
Notes: Blue background denotes the winner of the by-election. Pink background denotes a candidate elected from their party list prior to the by-election. Yellow background denotes the winner of the by-election, who was a list MP prior to the by-election. A ✓ or ✗ denotes status of any incumbent, win or lose respectively.
Party	Candidate	Votes	%	±%
Labour	Meka Whaitiri	4,590	40.90	-19.81
Mana Party	Te Hamua Nikora	2,931	26.12	+11.84
Māori Party	Na Raihania	2,229	19.86	−3.24
Green	Marama Davidson	1,251	11.15	+11.15
Legalise Cannabis	Michael Appleby	176	1.57	+1.57
Independent	Maurice Wairau	30	0.27	−1.64
Independent	Adam Holland	15	0.13	+0.13
Total Valid votes		11,222		
Informal votes		46	0.41	-4.93
Turnout		11,268	33.13	−22.46
Registered electors		34,008		
Labour hold	Majority	1,659	14.78	-22.83

=== 2011 election ===
2011 general election: Ikaroa-Rāwhiti
Notes:	Blue background denotes the winner of the electorate vote. Pink background denotes a candidate elected from their party list. Yellow background denotes an electorate win by a list member, or other incumbent. A ✓ or ✗ denotes status of any incumbent, win or lose respectively.						
Party	Candidate	Votes	%	±%	Party votes	%	±%
Labour	✓ Parekura Horomia	10,558	60.71	+9.22	9,054	49.58	−7.62
Māori Party	Na Raihania	4,017	23.10	−19.86	2,736	14.98	−11.91
Mana	Tawhai McClutchie	2,484	14.28	+14.28	1,754	9.60	+9.60
Independent	Maurice Wairau	332	1.91	+1.91			
Green					1,710	9.36	+6.21
NZ First					1,516	8.30	+2.93
National					1,091	5.97	+1.12
Legalise Cannabis					267	1.46	+0.47
Conservative					73	0.40	+0.40
ACT					36	0.20	−0.04
United Future					14	0.08	−0.01
Libertarianz					7	0.04	+0.02
Alliance					2	0.01	-0.004
Democrats					2	0.01	-0.004
Informal votes		928			470		
Total valid votes		17,391			18,262		
Labour hold	Majority	6,541	37.61	+29.08			

Electorate (as at 26 November 2011): 32,951

=== 2008 election ===
2008 general election: Ikaroa-Rāwhiti
Notes:	Blue background denotes the winner of the electorate vote. Pink background denotes a candidate elected from their party list. Yellow background denotes an electorate win by a list member, or other incumbent. A ✓ or ✗ denotes status of any incumbent, win or lose respectively.						
Party	Candidate	Votes	%	±%	Party votes	%	±%
Labour	✓ Parekura Horomia	9,927	51.49	−2.26	11,328	57.20	−1.08
Māori Party	Derek Fox	8,282	42.96	+0.16	5,326	26.89	−1.17
Green	Bevan Tipene	1,070	5.55	+5.55	625	3.16	+0.63
NZ First					1,064	5.37	+0.64
National					962	4.86	+2.13
Legalise Cannabis					196	0.99	+0.18
Family Party					77	0.39	+0.39
Bill and Ben					68	0.34	+0.34
ACT					47	0.24	+0.06
Progressive					35	0.18	−0.12
Kiwi					25	0.13	+0.13
United Future					17	0.09	−0.29
Workers Party					16	0.08	+0.08
Pacific					7	0.04	+0.04
Libertarianz					4	0.02	+0.01
Alliance					3	0.02	−0.01
Democrats					3	0.02	+0.01
RONZ					2	0.01	−0.01
RAM					0	0.00	±0.00
Informal votes		439			284		
Total valid votes		19,279			19,805		
Labour hold	Majority	1,645	8.53	−2.29			

=== 2005 election ===
2005 general election: Ikaroa-Rāwhiti
Notes:	Blue background denotes the winner of the electorate vote. Pink background denotes a candidate elected from their party list. Yellow background denotes an electorate win by a list member, or other incumbent. A ✓ or ✗ denotes status of any incumbent, win or lose respectively.						
Party	Candidate	Votes	%	±%	Party votes	%	±%
Labour	✓ Parekura Horomia	9,502	53.75	−24.31	10,639	58.28	
Māori Party	Atareta Poananga	7,570	42.80	+42.80	5,122	28.06	
Destiny	Tauha Te Kani	614	3.47		360	1.97	
NZ First					846	4.63	
National					499	2.73	
Green					443	2.43	
Legalise Cannabis					147	0.81	
United Future					70	0.38	
Progressive					54	0.30	
ACT					33	0.18	
Family Rights					14	0.08	
Christian Heritage					7	0.04	
99 MP					5	0.03	
Alliance					5	0.03	
One NZ					3	0.02	
RONZ					3	0.02	
Democrats					2	0.01	
Libertarianz					2	0.01	
Direct Democracy					1	0.01	
Informal votes		472			240		
Total valid votes		17,686			18,255		
Labour hold	Majority	1,932	10.92	−61.33			

=== 1999 election ===
1999 general election: Ikaroa-Rāwhiti
Notes:	Blue background denotes the winner of the electorate vote. Pink background denotes a candidate elected from their party list. Yellow background denotes an electorate win by a list member, or other incumbent. A ✓ or ✗ denotes status of any incumbent, win or lose respectively.						
Party	Candidate	Votes	%	±%	Party votes	%	±%
Labour	Parekura Horomia	7,442	40.99		10,763	59.03	
Independent	Derek Fox	6,747	37.16				
NZ First	Bill Gudgeon	1,084	5.97		2,185	11.98	
Alliance	Des Ratima	957	5.27		1,223	6.71	
Mauri Pacific	Rana Waitai	590	3.25		369	2.02	
National	Dale Stephens	376	2.07		812	4.45	
Christian Democrats	Tiwha Patricia Blake	235	1.29		170	0.93	
Christian Heritage	Peter Richard Amor	207	1.14		231	1.27	
Freedom Movement	Jennifer Waitai-Rapana	175	0.96		60	0.33	
ACT	Vicky Robin	139	0.77		99	0.54	
Mana Wahine	Beverly Rewa Nicholson	86	0.47				
Natural Law	Tim Irwin	66	0.36		28	0.15	
Aroha Ngia Tatou	Te Aroha Mei	51	0.28				
Mana Māori					750	4.11	
Green					727	3.99	
Legalise Cannabis					716	3.93	
Animals First					28	0.15	
One NZ					23	0.13	
The People's Choice					14	0.08	
McGillicuddy Serious					13	0.07	
United NZ					9	0.05	
Libertarianz					8	0.04	
NMP					3	0.02	
Republican					1	0.01	
South Island					1	0.01	
