= Cushla Tangaere-Manuel =

New Zealand Labour Party politician

Cushla Tangaere-Manuel MP
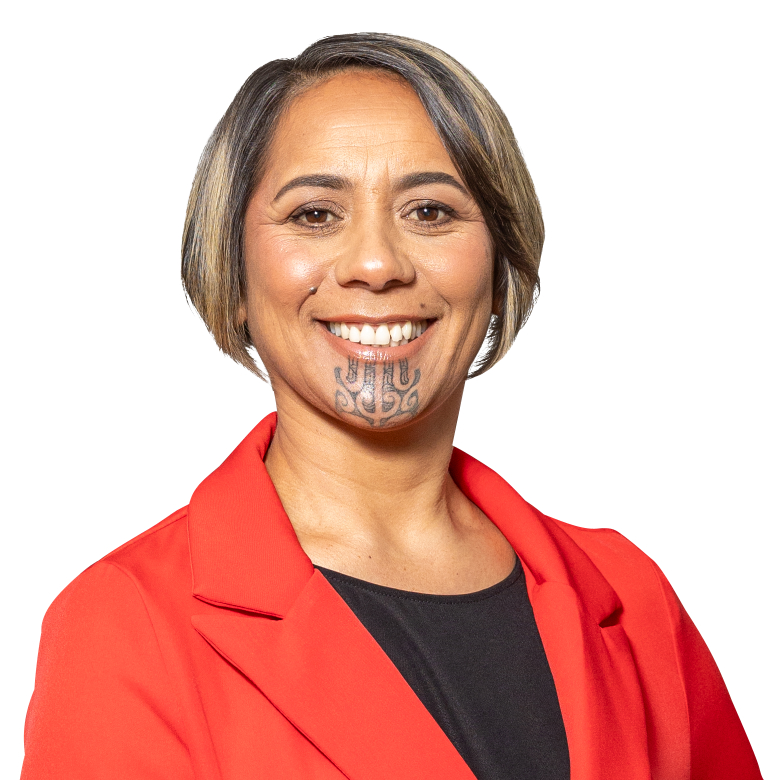

Member of the New Zealand Parliament for Ikaroa-Rāwhiti
- Incumbent
- Assumed office 14 October 2023
- Preceded by: Meka Whaitiri

Personal details
- Party: Labour
- Spouse: Russell Manuel
- Profession: Chief executive officer

Cushla Tangaere-Manuel is a New Zealand politician and member of Parliament in the House of Representatives for the Labour Party. She represents the Ikaroa-Rāwhiti electorate and was first elected at the 2023 general election. Prior to entering parliament, Tangaere-Manuel worked as a broadcaster for TVNZ and Whakaata Māori, and as a sports administrator.

== Early life and career ==
Tangaere-Manuel was born in Te Puia Springs and raised in Tikitiki. She received her education at Ngata Memorial College, where she was head girl. She is from Rangitukia and spent time at Hinepare Marae while she was growing up. She is of Ngāti Porou descent, born on 21 December.

Tangaere-Manuel worked for many years as a broadcaster at both TVNZ and Whakaata Māori, including as a reporter on the TV series Marae and presenting the talent show Māorioke. In 2009 she was the director and reporter on an item produced for Marae about an experimental youth court held on Te Poho O Rawiri Marae in Gisborne.

After working as a broadcaster Tangaere-Manuel changed to sports administration and for nine years was chief executive officer of the East Coast Rugby Football Union (NPEC), leaving in 2022. Tangaere-Manuel was one of many women working in advocacy and leadership for East Coast rugby, including Kath McLean and Agnes Walker. Her late father-in-law, John Manuel, had been president of NPEC.

In her chief executive role she led the East Coast Rugby Union out of overdraft to annual surpluses and an increase in the number to eight representative teams. She saw women's rugby on the rise, and new headquarters built. Campbell Dewes, who was chair during Tangaere-Manuel's tenure, said of her:

Cushla brought her reo (language) and tikanga (protocol, customs) to the table and emphasised the importance of our whanaungatanga (family values and ethos) and manaakitanga (hospitality), Ngati Poroutanga.

She went on to serve as the Māori Rugby Programme Manager / Kaiwhakahaere Kaupapa Whutupōro Māori for the New Zealand Rugby Union.

She has served on the boards of Kura Kaupapa Māori, iwi radio and the New Zealand Amateur Sports Association.

== Political career ==
New Zealand Parliament
Years	Term	Electorate		Party
2023–2014	54th	Ikaroa-Rāwhiti		Labour
2026–present	55th	Ikaroa-Rāwhiti	9	Labour

In the lead-up to the 2023 election Tangaere-Manuel was selected as Labour's candidate for the Ikaroa-Rāwhiti seat after Meka Whaitiri left Labour and waka jumped to Te Pāti Māori earlier that year. She ran as an electorate candidate only and was not on the party list. Tangaere-Manuel won the seat by a margin of 2,874 votes, and was one of just two new MPs elected in Labour's defeat in 2023 along with Reuben Davidson.

Following the formation of the National-led coalition government in late November 2023, Tangaere-Manuel became spokesperson for tourism and hospitality, forestry, and cyclone recovery in the Shadow Cabinet of Chris Hipkins.

Following a shadow cabinet reshuffle in early March 2025, Tangaere-Manuel joined Hipkins' economic team. She retained the forestry portfolio and gained the Māori economy and sports and recreation portfolios. She lost the tourism and hospitality, and cyclone recovery portfolios. On 11 March 2025, Tangaere-Manuel was appointed assistant whip of the Labour Party.

In mid-March 2026, Tangaere-Manuel gained the emergency management and Natural Hazards Commission portfolios while retaining her forestry, Māori economy and sports and recreation portfolios.

During the 2026 New Zealand general election, Tangaere-Manuel contested the Ikaroa-Rāwhiti electorate for Labour. She was ranked ninth place on the Labour party list. Based on preliminary results, she retained Ikaroa-Rāwhiti for Labour by a margin of 3,132 seats.

== Personal life ==
Tangaere-Manuel is married and has eight siblings.

New Zealand Parliament
Preceded by Meka Whaitiri	Member of Parliament for Ikaroa-Rāwhiti; 2023–present	Incumbent
