= Williams & Kettle =

New Zealand stock & station agency and general merchants

Williams & Kettle Limited 158523
- Company type: Public listed company
- Industry: Stock & Station Agency, General Merchants
- Founded: 21 May 1891; 134 years ago in Napier, New Zealand
- Founders: F W Williams and N Kettle
- Defunct: 1 June 2005
- Fate: bought by Wrightson in 2005
- Successor: PGG Wrightson
- Headquarters: Wilket House, Shakespeare Road, Napier, New Zealand
- Area served: North Island East Coast — Poverty Bay and more

Williams & Kettle Limited with headquarters in Napier, New Zealand, owned a stock and station agency business and a general merchants business with branches throughout the east coast of the North Island of New Zealand. Incorporated as a co-operative in 1891, it had been founded in 1885 by landowner and businessman Frederic Williams (1854–1940) with Nathaniel Kettle (1854–1940), a brother-in-law of John Roberts the local principal of Dunedin's Murray Roberts and a former Murray Roberts & Co employee.

== Establishment ==
Williams had set himself up in his own custom house agency in 1880 after forming a good relationship with William Nelson and becoming agent for his new Nelson Brothers' boiling down and canned-meat plant which Nelson was establishing at Tomoana just north of Hastings in conjunction with Frederic's uncle, J N Williams. Together they formed and developed shipping links around the coast and to Britain. In 1885 he took in Nathaniel Kettle.

Dunedin-born Kettle, having served an apprenticeship with G G Russell & Co, wool and general merchants, had opened a Napier branch for Murray Roberts (at first named Murray Common & Co) in 1877 but the partnership was dissolved in 1885 and Kettle joined Williams in his Napier shipping agency. His new partnership with F W Williams was reported in the local newspaper beside the account of his colleagues' presentation on his departure on 28 July 1885. Kettle was a son of surveyor Charles Kettle and his wife, Lena, was the only daughter of Major Von Tempsky. They had married in 1880.

The close relationship with Nelson Brothers would last until soon after the First World War when it was sold to W & R Fletcher, the local subsidiary of Vestey Brothers.

== Growth ==
F W Williams & Kettle advertised they were willing to make "liberal cash advances" on unshorn wool clips and other produce and undertake the entire range of station agency business. From Port Ahuriri Kettle travelled up and down the East Coast making friends and finding clients. Investment propositions would be mailed to London investment houses which would reply by cable. Security documents could then be prepared and executed and lodged with a bank. The bank would cable confirmation and when the lender cabled back their consent the funds were advanced to the station owner.

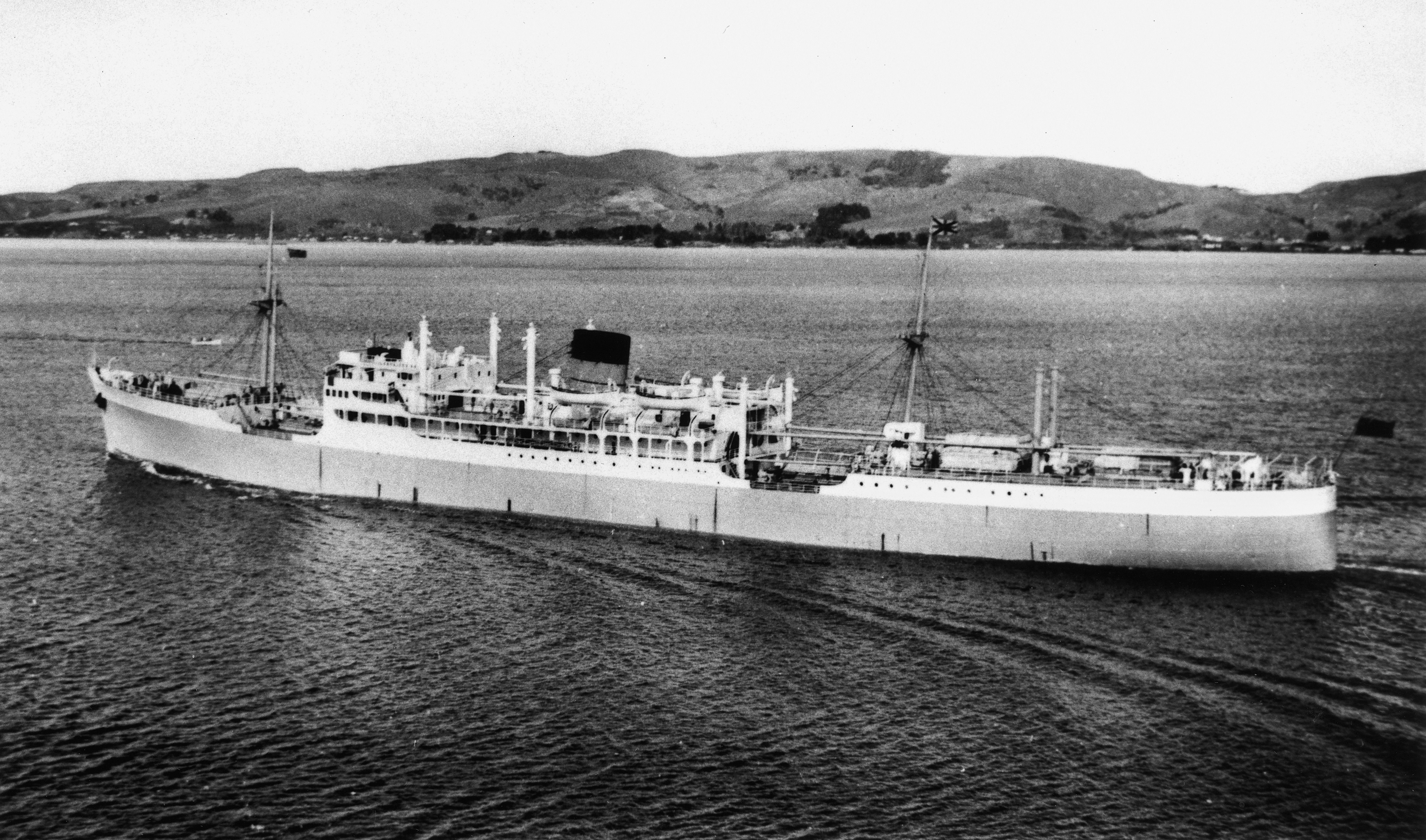
Port Napier launched in 1947

=== Shipping ===
Homeboats and Little Boats.

==== Port Line ====
The success of frozen meat exports boosted produce exports too. The far away British and European markets for both wool and meat demanded long-distance shipping services. Well known to the big shipping companies, William Nelson and F W Williams eventually assisted in the formation of the Tyser shipping line later known as the Port Line. (Note: Tyser Line —> Commonwealth and Dominion Line —> Cunard Line Australasian Service, Commonwealth and Dominion Line —> Port Line —> Associated Container Transportation) With the knowledge this gave them, they were able to achieve some moderation of the charges made by the other shipping services. The tie with the Port Line was broken in 1969.

==== Richardson & Co ====
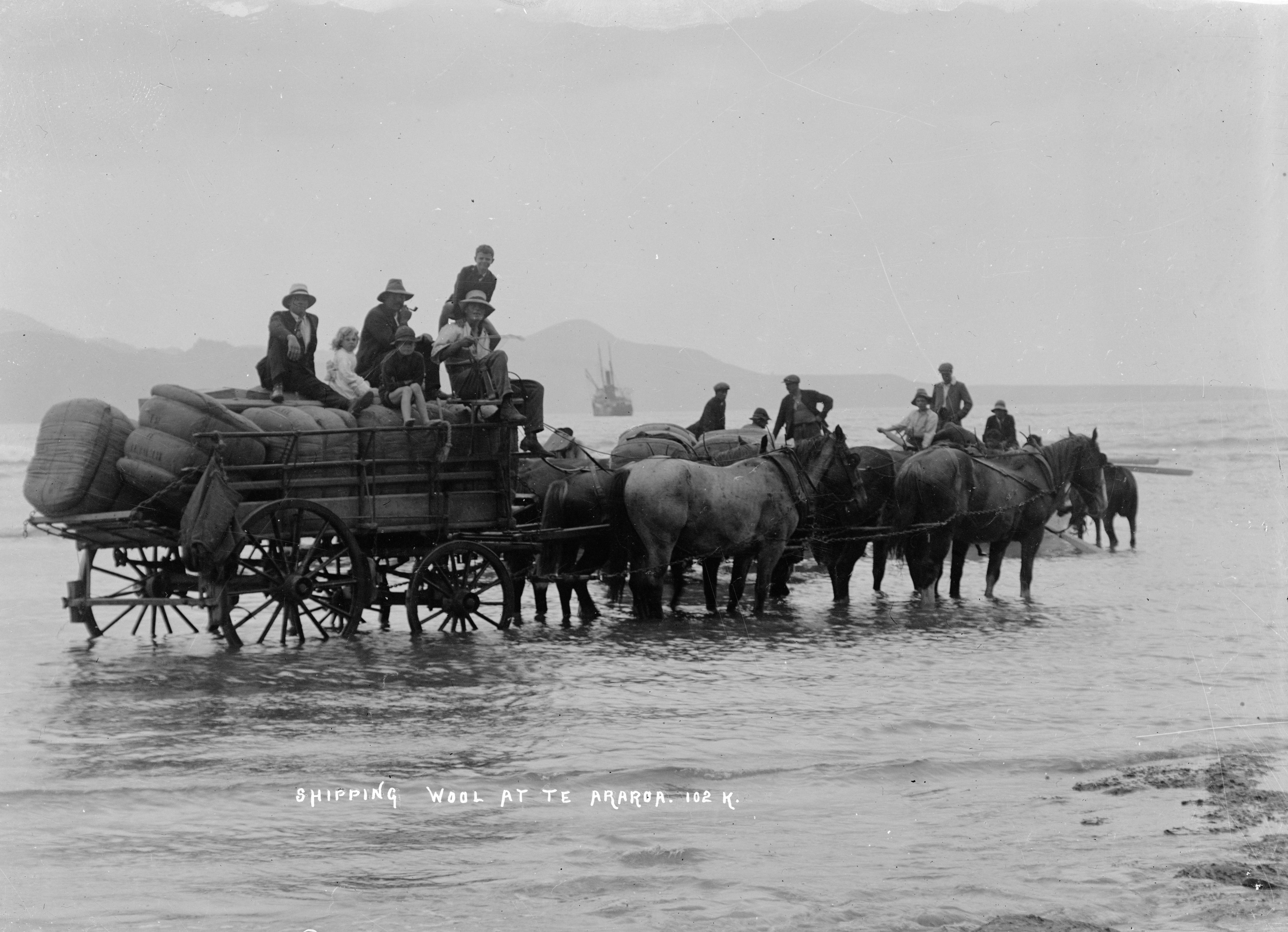
Shipping wool from Te Araroa, the steamer waits, the lighter in a flooded creek is almost hidden by the horses on the creek's bank

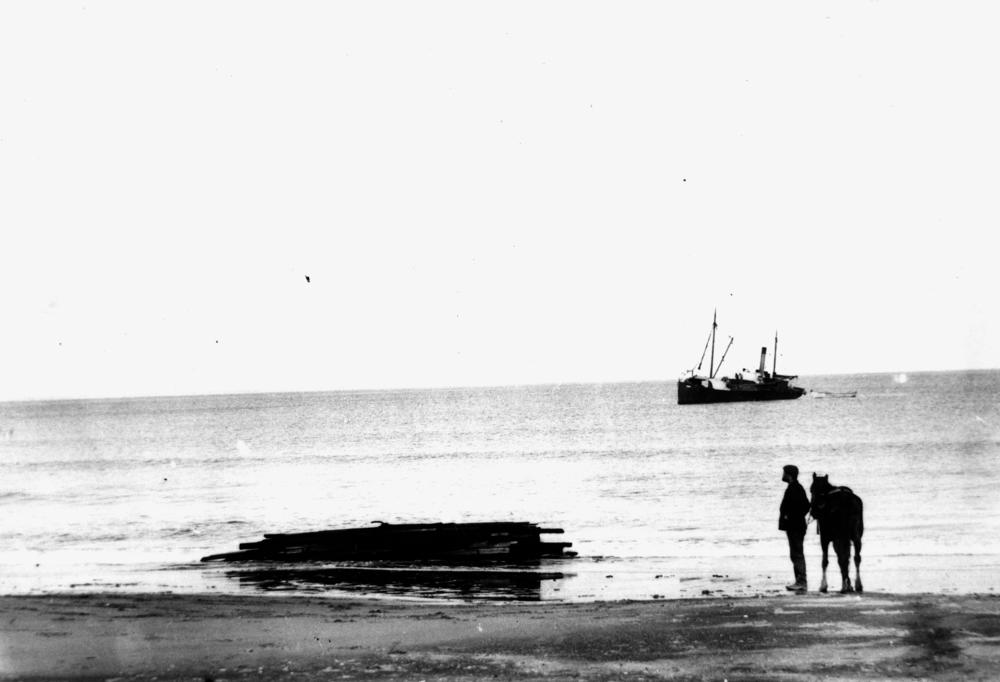
Kahu unloading timber. Tokomaru Bay 1930

Sea transport was often the most comfortable means of access for passengers and the only practical outlet for produce, particularly wool, for remote properties. Surfboats would deliver cargoes to the beach and pick them up, wool would be unloaded from bullock wagons axle-deep in the water. Captain John Campbell went into business with Napier shipping agent G. E. G. Richardson (George Edward Gordon Richardson 1834–1905) in the 1860s. Naming themselves Richardson & Co they not only lightered cargoes to and from ships in the Napier roadstead but worked as many as 75 open landings on the East Coast as well as ports from Auckland to Lyttelton.

Ships, the only contact with the outside world for those unable to drop their commitments might call as little as twice a year.

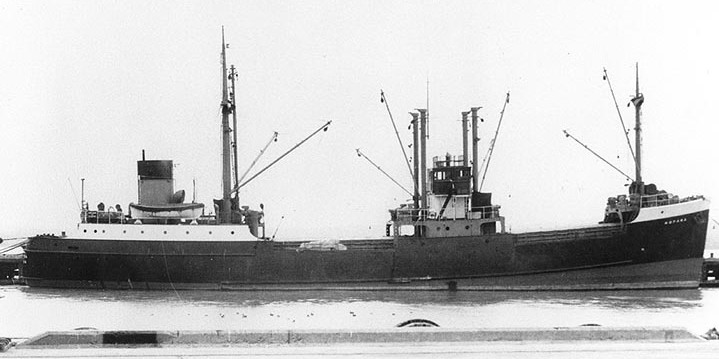
Kopara launched in 1938 saw Pacific War service in the US Navy

Kahu and Fanny. Kahu carried passengers and freight between Napier and Wellington with occasional side trips to Lyttelton and the Chatham Islands. Other ships included Weka and Ripple.

Campbell sold out and moved to Fielding in 1887.

Williams & Kettle became a major shareholder. They sold the bulk of their shareholding in Richardson & Co to Union Steam Ship in 1934. Long before that, in 1908, some of their shares were sold to Thomas Borthwick and Sons.

In 1966, Richardson and Co's fleet was six modern motor vessels.

== Incorporation ==
F W Williams and Kettle remained a private partnership until 1891. There were advantages in being a locally owned business competing with branches run from other parts of the country but in 1891 Hawke's Bay Farmers Co-op Association was formed. As a co-operative it seemed to have the advantage of locking in customers and might in that way take business from Williams & Kettle. There were offers to merge put to each other by both parties before Williams & Kettle themselves incorporated a limited liability company to be worked as a co-operative aiming to at least retain their existing customers. The Williams & Kettle co-operative took from the partnership as of 1 July 1891:

their business premises and plant at Napier, Hastings, Spit and Gisborne and
their interests in steamers and lighters
agencies and
stock in trade

The sale gave the two partners more than a small fortune in saleable shares in the new Williams & Kettle Limited.

== Directors ==
From 1891 and into the 20th century besides chairman Williams and Nathaniel Kettle the board of directors was a list of prominent regional run-holders. They were:

J H Coleman (1834–1928)
William Nelson (1843–1932)
Rechab Harding (1844–1897)
A S G Carlyon (1859–1927)
J B Chambers (1859–1931)
Sir William Russell (1838–1913)
Harold Russell (1871–1938)
L H McHardy (1863–1927)

The founders survived until 1940 but the other directors listed above, except for Harding, all died between 1927 and 1932.

F W Williams retired from the post of chairman, and left active management to Nathaniel Kettle, at the end of the First World War but remained a Williams & Kettle director and chairman of Richardson & Co. Nathaniel Kettle handed over day-to-day top management to Leslie Rolls in 1933. Harold Russell became a director when his father, Sir William Russell, died in 1913. Upon the retirement of Kettle in 1932, Russell became chairman and held that role until his death.

== Locations ==
The Spit
Napier
Gisborne 1889
Hastings 1892
Pahiatua 1898
Dannevirke 1902
Stortford Lodge 1902
Woodville 1903?
Waipawa 1904
Wairoa 1909?
Tolaga Bay
Takapau 1926
Waipukurau 1934?
Ruatoria 1935
Tokomaru Bay 1963
Taupo 1966

== Services ==
Stock and station agency

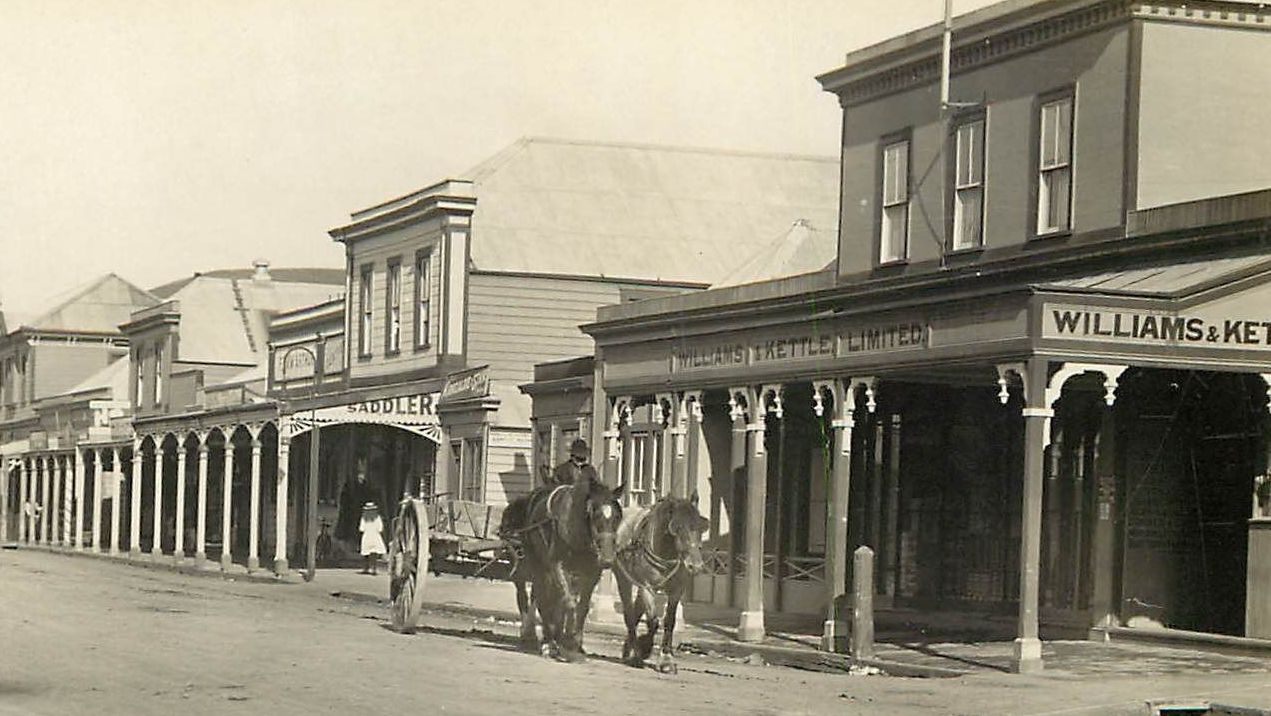
Waipawa branch 1915

Merchandising of:

- Livestock
- Wool
- Grain and seed
- Horticulture
- Fertilizer
- Farm merchandising

together with these services:

- Rural financing
- Forestry
- Real estate
- Farm ownership and management
- Insurance
- Fuel distribution

== Ownership ==
=== Bought by Wrightson ===
Williams & Kettle was bought by Wrightson in early 2005 following their bidding war with rivals Fonterra and Pyne Gould Guinness. At that time Williams & Kettle operated through 35 branches mainly spread throughout the east coast and centre of the North Island.

=== Brand dropped ===
The Williams & Kettle brand began leaving buildings, vehicles and staff uniforms in late 2008.
