= Flaxmere =

Suburb of Hastings, New Zealand

- Suburb
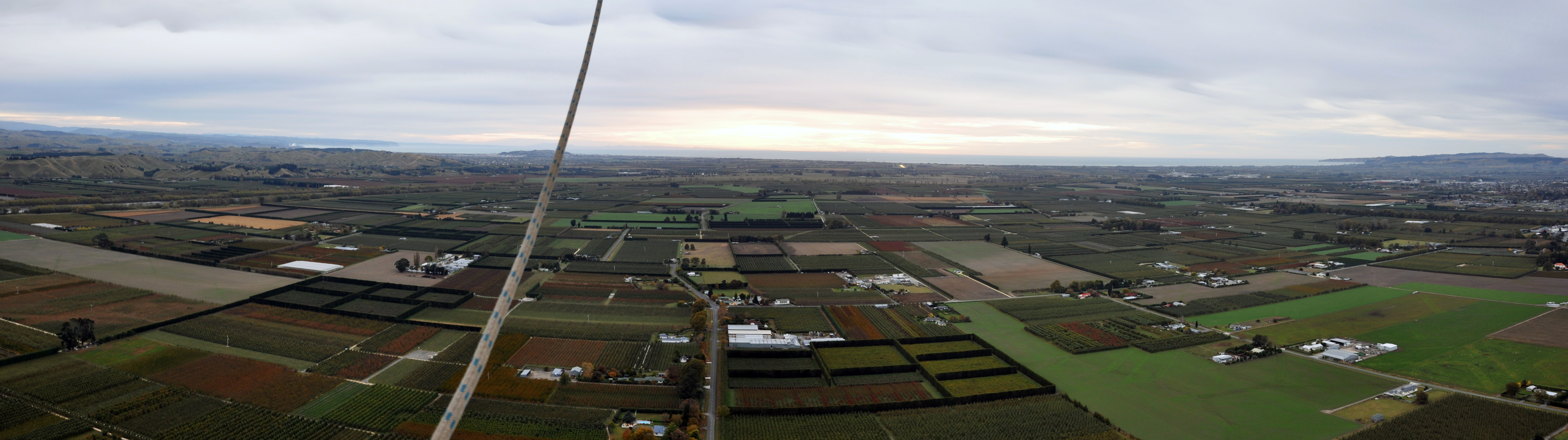
- Aerial photo looking towards Napier
- Interactive map of Flaxmere
- Coordinates: 39°37′S 176°47′E
- Country: New Zealand
- City: Hastings
- Local authority: Hastings District Council
- Electoral ward: Flaxmere General Ward; Heretaunga General Ward; Takitimu Māori Ward

Area
  - Land: 718 ha (1,770 acres)

Population (June 2025)
  - Total: 12,190
  - Density: 1,700/km^{2} (4,400/sq mi)

| Omahu | Twyford |
| | Flaxmere | Frimley |
| Bridge Pa | Pakipaki | Camberley |

Flaxmere (Māori: Paharakeke) is a township in the Hastings District and outlying suburb of Hastings City, in the Hawke's Bay Region of New Zealand's North Island.

== History ==
The original European owner of the land was Sir William Russell, for many years of local member of parliament and Leader of the Opposition from 1894 to 1901. Russell called his estate Flaxmere. When Hastings City Council needed to expand, subdivision of the land started in 1963 and in the following year, the area was incorporated into the area held by the (then) city council. The subdivision was named after the original estate name. Russell's son, Harold Russell, inherited a homestead Little Flaxmere and land that was part of original estate. This is today located in nearby Twyford.

For the subdivision Hastings City Council bought 455 acres (184 ha), which had 150 acres (61 ha) zoned for industry, 40 acres for Flaxmere Park and 12 acres (4.9 ha) for Flaxmere Shopping Centre, including a car park for about 600 cars.

== Demographics ==
Flaxmere covers 7.18 km^{2} (2.77 sq mi) and had an estimated population of 12,190 as of June 2025, with a population density of 1,698 people per km^{2}.

Historical population
| Year | Pop. | ±% p.a. |
|---|---|---|
| 2006 | 9,939 | — |
| 2013 | 9,630 | −0.45% |
| 2018 | 11,250 | +3.16% |
| 2023 | 11,745 | +0.86% |
The 2006 population is for a smaller area of 5.87 km^{2}. Source:

Flaxmere had a population of 11,745 in the 2023 New Zealand census, an increase of 495 people (4.4%) since the 2018 census, and an increase of 2,115 people (22.0%) since the 2013 census. There were 5,823 males, 5,889 females, and 33 people of other genders in 3,078 dwellings. 1.8% of people identified as LGBTIQ+. The median age was 28.8 years (compared with 38.1 years nationally). There were 3,339 people (28.4%) aged under 15 years, 2,748 (23.4%) aged 15 to 29, 4,539 (38.6%) aged 30 to 64, and 1,119 (9.5%) aged 65 or older.

People could identify as more than one ethnicity. The results were 37.7% European (Pākehā); 58.3% Māori; 25.7% Pasifika; 4.0% Asian; 0.3% Middle Eastern, Latin American and African New Zealanders (MELAA); and 1.1% other, which includes people giving their ethnicity as "New Zealander". English was spoken by 94.1%, Māori by 16.7%, Samoan by 8.7%, and other languages by 6.5%. No language could be spoken by 2.7% (e.g. too young to talk). New Zealand Sign Language was known by 0.7%. The percentage of people born overseas was 14.9, compared with 28.8% nationally.

Religious affiliations were 39.0% Christian, 0.3% Hindu, 0.4% Islam, 7.3% Māori religious beliefs, 0.4% Buddhist, 0.4% New Age, and 0.9% other religions. People who answered that they had no religion were 45.4%, and 6.3% of people did not answer the census question.

Of those at least 15 years old, 660 (7.9%) people had a bachelor's or higher degree, 4,749 (56.5%) had a post-high school certificate or diploma, and 3,006 (35.8%) people exclusively held high school qualifications. The median income was $37,400, compared with $41,500 nationally. 210 people (2.5%) earned over $100,000 compared to 12.1% nationally. The employment status of those at least 15 was 4,329 (51.5%) full-time, 858 (10.2%) part-time, and 405 (4.8%) unemployed.

Individual statistical areas
| Name | Area (km^{2}) | Population | Density (per km^{2}) | Dwellings | Median age | Median income |
|---|---|---|---|---|---|---|
| Flaxmere West | 0.92 | 2,826 | 3,072 | 723 | 27.0 years | $38,000 |
| Omahu Strip | 2.93 | 282 | 96 | 87 | 34.3 years | $39,200 |
| Lochain Park | 0.94 | 2,985 | 3,176 | 774 | 27.9 years | $37,700 |
| Flaxmere Park | 1.35 | 2,736 | 2,027 | 723 | 30.9 years | $37,800 |
| Flaxmere South | 1.05 | 2,919 | 2,919 | 765 | 29.0 years | $36,500 |
| New Zealand | | | | | 38.1 years | $41,500 |

== Description ==
Flaxmere was built to cater to the housing demand of Hastings. It was intended to be an upper-middle class subdivision, but because land was subdivided into smaller lots, it became a low income neighbourhood.

It has a small shopping centre with a petrol station, post office, bakery, video store, butchery, indoor rock climbing centre, and various other businesses offering necessities and/or leisure. Other amenities include a library, police station, several churches and Flaxmere Waterworld, an indoor swimming complex.

== Education ==
Flaxmere has four state primary schools, which provide education for years 1 to 8:

- Flaxmere Primary School has a roll of 395. It opened in 1971.
- Te Whai Hiringa, formerly Peterhead School, has a roll of 418. It was open by 1973.
- Te Kura o Waharino Irongate School has a roll of 174. It opened in 1975.
- Te Kura o Kimi Ora has a roll of 142. It opened in 1988.

The township also has two other schools:

- Flaxmere College is a state secondary school for years 7 to 15, with a roll of 370. It was established in 1976.
- Te Kura Kaupapa Māori o Ngati Kahungunu Ki Heretaunga is a Year 1–13 Māori immersion school, with a roll of 233. It opened in 1998.

All these schools are co-educational. Rolls are as of March 2026.
