= Heartland Bank =

Bank in New Zealand

Heartland Bank Limited
- Type: Publicly listed company
- Traded as: NZX: HGH; S&P/NZX 50 component
- Industry: Financial services
- Founded: 5 January 2011
- Headquarters: Auckland, New Zealand
- Area served: New Zealand & Australia
- Key people: Chris Flood, CEO
- Products: Savings & deposits, reverse mortgages, small business finance, motor vehicle finance, livestock finance
- Total assets: $4.0 billion
- Number of employees: more than 350 (2017)
- Rating: BBB, Fitch 2022
- Website: www.heartland.co.nz

Heartland Bank is a New Zealand owned bank that was created in 2011 through the merging of four financial organisations. Heartland was granted its bank registration by the Reserve Bank of New Zealand in 2012. It specialises in motor vehicle loans, reverse mortgages, small business finance, livestock finance, savings, investments and deposits.

== History ==
=== Predecessors ===
In 1875, the 'Ashburton Permanent Building & Investment Society' was established, which subsequently merged with 'SMC Building Society and Loan & Building Society', becoming 'CBS Canterbury'. Separately, the 'Southern Cross Building Society' opened in Auckland in 1923, offering a similar range of financial services to its customers throughout the North Island.

Four leading stock and station businesses; Williams & Kettle, Wrightson, Pyne Gould Guinness, and Reid Farmers merged to become PGG Wrightson Finance (PWF) in the 1940s. PWF provided financial services to its farming and rural clients.

In 1952, 'MARAC Finance' was established lending money to businesses to purchase commercial vehicles as the 'North Shore Rental Van Company'. Over the next 55 years it grew to provide financing, lending and insurance services to businesses and individuals.

In late 2010 a plan was hatched to bring together these four separate financial institutions to create a financial company with national coverage across New Zealand that had enough assets to become a bank. On 5 January 2011, CBS Canterbury, Southern Cross Building Society and MARAC Finance Limited combined to become one organisation. On 31 August 2011, the Group acquired PGG Wrightson Finance.

=== Becoming a bank ===
Heartland was created from the merger of CBS Canterbury (Canterbury Building Society), Southern Cross, MARAC and PGG Wrightson Finance. The rationale for the merger was to create a financial institution that had both widespread national coverage and enough assets and resources to get a full banking licence.

On 12 December 2012, the Reserve Bank of New Zealand announced that Heartland Building Society has been registered as a bank and the organisation changed its name to Heartland Bank.

=== Credit Rating ===
In May 2013 ratings agency, Standard & Poor's placed Heartland Bank, together with seven other small New Zealand financial institutions on a credit rating downgrade watch, citing potential risks from overexposure to New Zealand's highly inflated housing market. In October 2014, Heartland's rating was raised to BBB (outlook stable) in October 2014. In October 2015, Fitch, another credit ratings agency confirmed Heartland with a rating of BBB (Outlook stable), noting "core asset quality to remain sound, benefiting from continued improvement in underwriting standards and good economic conditions". In September 2018, Fitch affirmed Heartland's credit rating of BBB (outlook Stable) noting Heartland "has achieved a leading niche franchise and some price-setting power, which resulted in a strong net interest margin".

=== Acquisitions and Partnerships ===
In February 2014, Heartland moved into the Reverse Mortgage (or Home Equity Release) market through the purchase of Sentinel in New Zealand and Australian Seniors Finance in Australia.

In September 2014, Heartland purchased a 10% shareholding in peer-to-peer lender Harmoney Limited.

In January 2017, Heartland partnered with Spotcap Australia, an online lender to small and medium-sized businesses.

=== Open for Business – Unsecured Small Business Loans ===
In April 2016, Heartland launched an online platform, Open for Business, offering unsecured loans for small businesses. An application through Open for Business can be completed in two to three minutes and the applicant receives an immediate decision.

=== Savings & Investments ===
In May 2018, Heartland's Direct Call Account received a 5-star rating from CANSTAR in its Flexible Saver and Regular Saver categories.

In June 2018, Heartland launched a mobile app for its deposit customers to give them better control over their investments.

In July 2018, Heartland was named Canstar Bank of the Year – Savings. Canstar researched, analysed and compared 31 accounts from 11 providers for the annual ratings.
