= William Nelson (industrialist) =

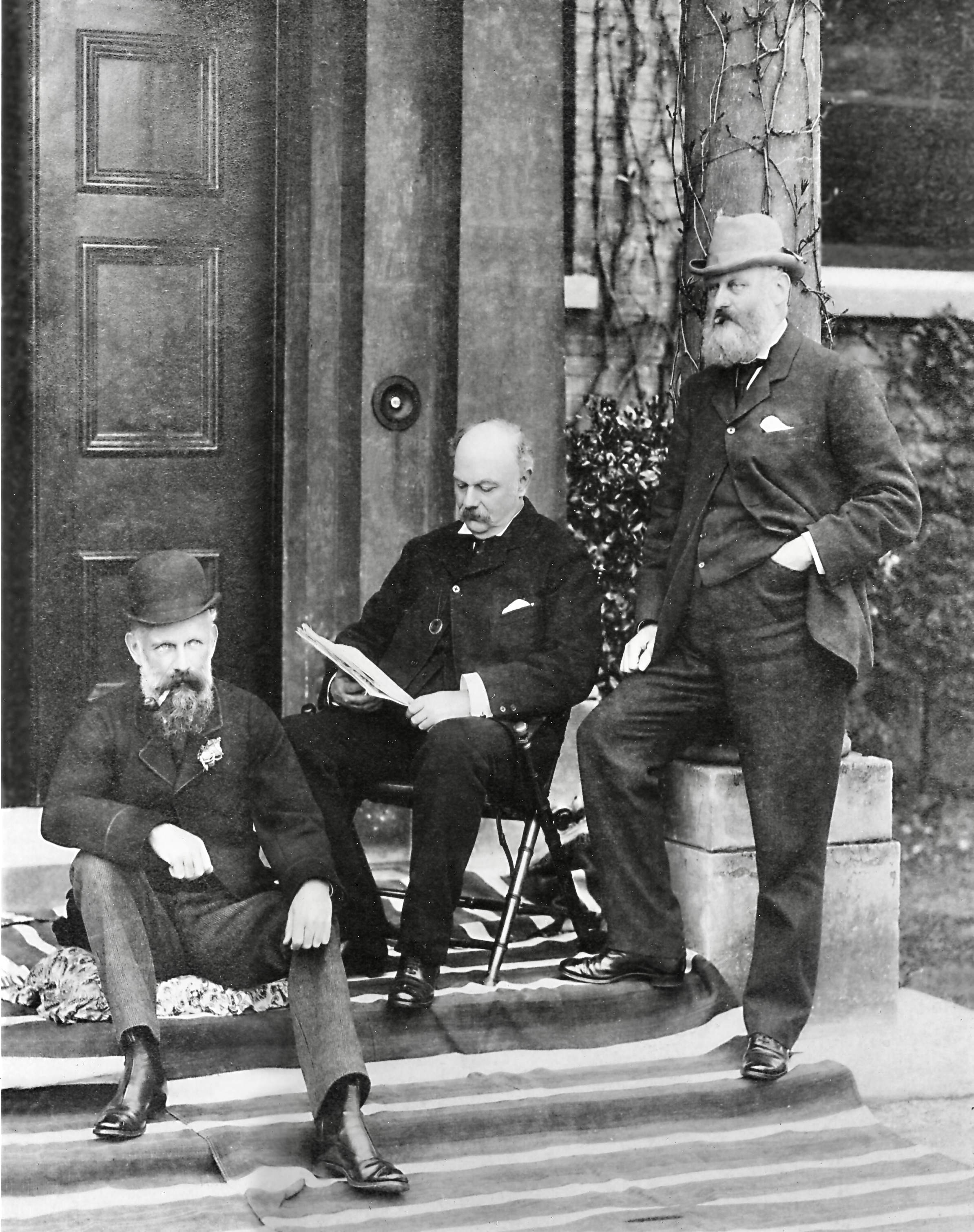
- Nelson brothers: William, Montague and Frederick Nelson
- Born: February 15, 1843; Warwick
- Died: 16 November 1932 (aged 88–89); Tomoana
- Known for: Nelson Brothers Limited
- Spouse(s): Sarah Newcome Bicknell (1865), Emma Caroline Williams (1884), Katharine Maud Orford (1922)
- Children: 11
- Parent(s): Sarah Philbrick and George Nelson

William Nelson (15 February 1843 – 16 November 1932) was a New Zealand industrialist and farmer described in his obituaries as "the father of Hawkes Bay". He personally managed his Nelson Brothers freezing works at Tomoana for nearly 40 years.

== Emigration ==
He arrived in Auckland in February 1863 with his elder brother Frederick Nelson. They settled in Hawkes Bay but their farming ventures were unsuccessful and William returned to his father's business in Warwick, England in the early 1870s leaving Fred in New Zealand. Gathering management experience in Warwick he meanwhile learnt all he could about meat preservation to export the meat otherwise wasted in New Zealand for the sake of consumers.

== Meat exports ==
Fred and William, now back in New Zealand, established in 1880 a boiling down and canned-meat plant at Tomoana just north of Hastings in Hawke's Bay. The buildings were carefully planned for use as a refrigeration plant and laid out accordingly but the brothers waited for others to prove the best maritime refrigeration process. The first frozen meat shipment went to London from Otago in 1882. In London Frederick and his brother Montague, manager of their father's Warwick gelatine factory, floated a company, Nelson Brothers Limited in May 1883 to raise capital for refrigeration machinery at Tomoana. In March 1884 Nelson Brothers arranged the first shipment, 9,000 sheep and six bullocks, on the sailing ship Turakina. By the middle of the 1890s Nelson Brothers Limited had the largest share of New Zealand's frozen meat export trade. In 1914 232,560 sheep, 217,908 lambs and 5,250 bullocks were slaughtered and frozen for export.

Nelson Brothers Limited opened new freezing works at Waipukurau, Gisborne, Woodville and Spring Creek.

== Pastoral ==
Prospering he and his brother bought pastoral land to supply stock for the works. He established one of the country's best Southdown flocks, trained young men in farm work and farm management, milled timber from his own property and supplied firewood to his freezing works' furnaces. He controlled 5,000 acres on the Heretaunga plain's flats and 30, 000 acres of hill country.

He had the confidence of his workmen and his freezing works at Tomoana during this period were exceptional in having little trouble from employees' unions. His first wife died young after giving him five sons and four daughters and he remarried a daughter of Bishop William Williams who bore him another son and another daughter. Following her death he married a third time aged 79.

A strong proponent of education he and others established what became Hereworth boys' preparatory school and Woodford House secondary school for girls both eventually in Havelock North.

There is a Nelson Park in each of Hastings and Napier. A life-size bronze statue of William Nelson and his terrier was unveiled in Hastings in 2013 following the redevelopment of the old William Nelson park for retail use. A large part of the funds realised were used to improve local sports facilities and create William Nelson Skatepark.

== Family ==
In 1897, his daughter Eva married the Hawke's Bay farmer, sportsman and politician Harold Russell.
