= Waipatu =

Suburb of Hastings, New Zealand

- Suburb
- Interactive map of Waipatu
- Coordinates: 39°37′45″S 176°52′30″E
- Country: New Zealand
- City: Hastings
- Local authority: Hastings District Council
- Electoral ward: Heretaunga General Ward; Takitimu Māori Ward

Area
  - Land: 326 ha (810 acres)

Population (June 2025)
  - Total: 390
  - Density: 120/km^{2} (310/sq mi)

Tomoana		Mangateretere
Mahora	Waipatu
Mayfair		Karamu

Waipatu is a semi-rural suburb of Hastings, in the Hastings District and Hawke's Bay Region of New Zealand's North Island.

== Demographics ==
Tomoana statistical area, which includes both Tomoana and Waipatu, covers 3.26 km^{2} (1.26 sq mi) and had an estimated population of 390 as of June 2025, with a population density of 120 people per km^{2}.

Historical population
Year	Pop.	±% p.a.
2006	270	—
2013	237	−1.85%
2018	306	+5.24%
2023	345	+2.43%

Tomoana had a population of 345 in the 2023 New Zealand census, an increase of 39 people (12.7%) since the 2018 census, and an increase of 108 people (45.6%) since the 2013 census. There were 174 males and 171 females in 111 dwellings. 3.5% of people identified as LGBTIQ+. The median age was 33.1 years (compared with 38.1 years nationally). There were 87 people (25.2%) aged under 15 years, 69 (20.0%) aged 15 to 29, 144 (41.7%) aged 30 to 64, and 45 (13.0%) aged 65 or older.

People could identify as more than one ethnicity. The results were 48.7% European (Pākehā); 60.9% Māori; 7.0% Pasifika; 1.7% Asian; 0.9% Middle Eastern, Latin American and African New Zealanders (MELAA); and 1.7% other, which includes people giving their ethnicity as "New Zealander". English was spoken by 94.8%, Māori by 25.2%, Samoan by 0.9%, and other languages by 4.3%. No language could be spoken by 2.6% (e.g. too young to talk). New Zealand Sign Language was known by 0.9%. The percentage of people born overseas was 8.7, compared with 28.8% nationally.

Religious affiliations were 27.8% Christian, 6.1% Māori religious beliefs, and 0.9% New Age. People who answered that they had no religion were 59.1%, and 5.2% of people did not answer the census question.

Of those at least 15 years old, 51 (19.8%) people had a bachelor's or higher degree, 165 (64.0%) had a post-high school certificate or diploma, and 48 (18.6%) people exclusively held high school qualifications. The median income was $39,400, compared with $41,500 nationally. 24 people (9.3%) earned over $100,000 compared to 12.1% nationally. The employment status of those at least 15 was 147 (57.0%) full-time, 30 (11.6%) part-time, and 12 (4.7%) unemployed.

== Marae ==
The community has two marae, belonging to the Ngāti Kahungunu hapū of Ngāti Hāwea and Ngati Hōri: Ruahāpia Marae and Karaitiana Takamoana meeting house, and Waipatu Marae and Heretaunga meeting house.

In October 2020, the Government committed $6,020,910 from the Provincial Growth Fund to upgrade a group of 18 marae, including both Ruahāpia and Waipatu. The funding was expected to create 39 jobs.

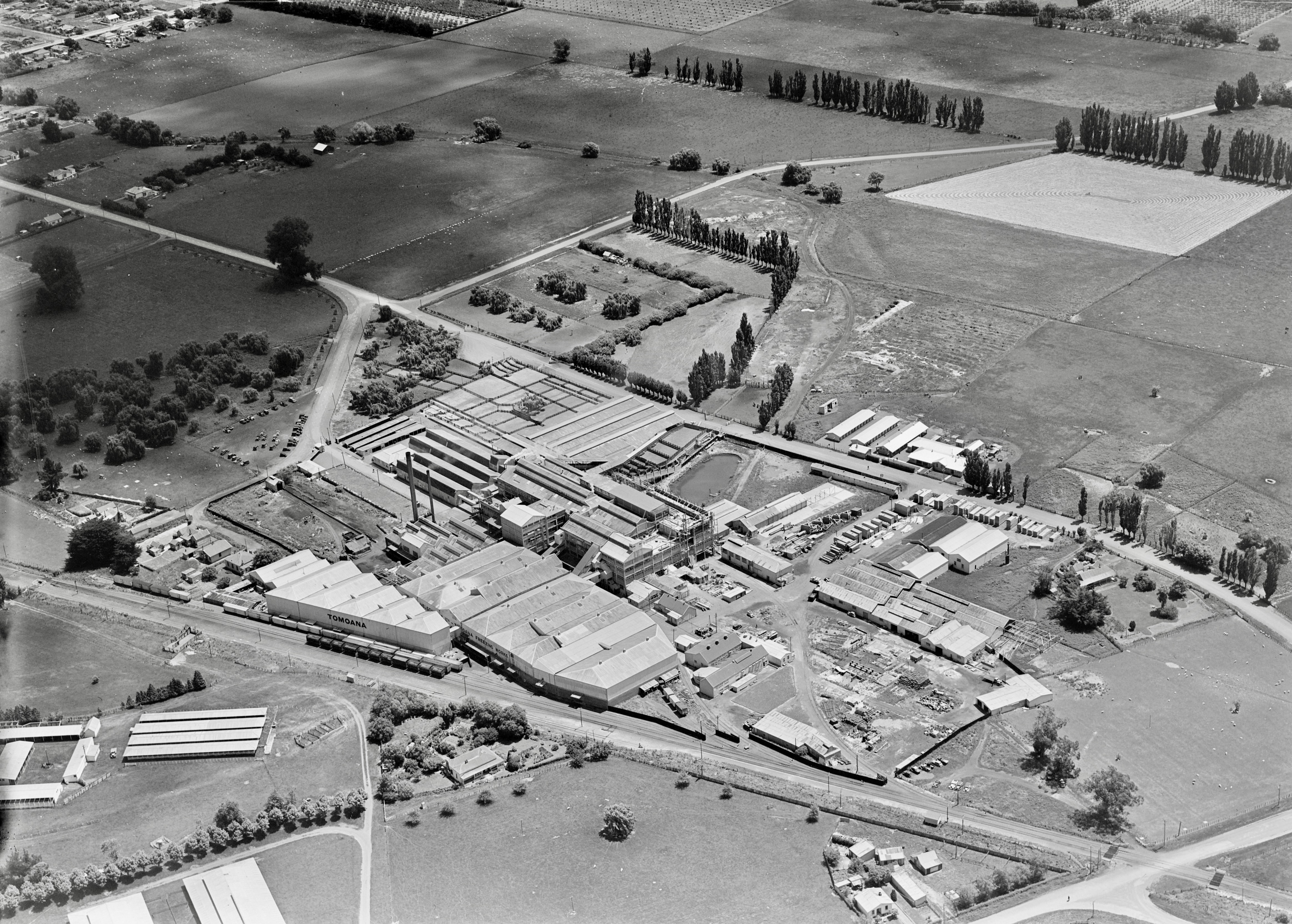
Tōmoana freezing works and railway in 1949

== Tōmoana freezing works ==
Until the 1880s the area shared the history of Hastings. In 1881 George Nelson, built a boiling-down plant, Tōmoana Works, to produce tallow and gravy for gelatine and over 23,000 sheep were boiled down in the first year. By 1882 the works was also killing cattle and produced its own cans for export of the meat, etc. George Nelson also built Waikoko Homestead. An artesian rig was being used to sink a bore near the homestead. The name was: “Wai (water), “patu” (to strike). In 1882 Henare Tōmoana, of Waipatu, Hastings, advertised 36,700 acres (14,900 ha) of very rich agricultural and grazing land for sale with totora and white pine.

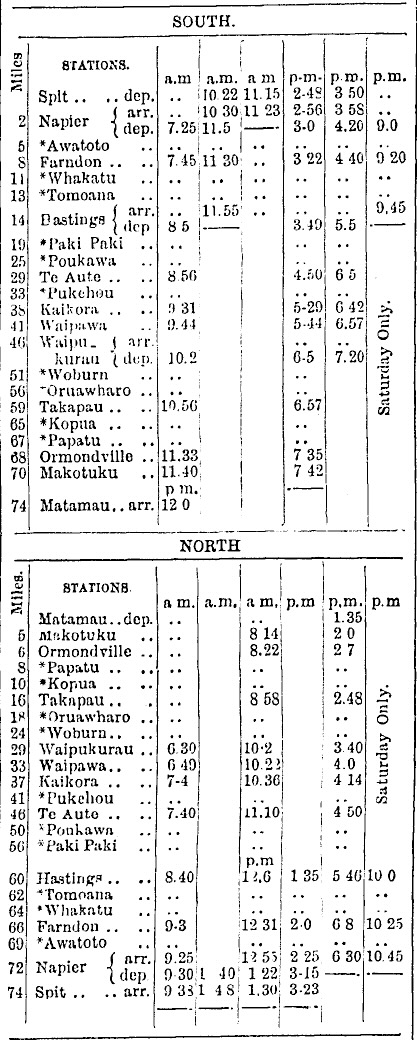
1884 timetable

On 1 October 1883 Nelson Brothers Limited freezing works opened, and 9,000 frozen carcasses from Tōmoana left Napier in March 1884 on the sailing ship Turakina. Initially, the plant was designed to kill 400 sheep a day. In 1884 41,000 sheep and 10 bullocks were exported frozen. The freezing capacity at Tōmoana was doubled, and by 1891, all of the original machinery had been scrapped. In 1897 the Works flooded. In 1907 there was a fire in a freezer store. In 1913 Tōmoana cannery closed. By 1917, the daily kill capacity had increased to 4,000 a day, plus 100 cattle. In November 1920 the Vestey Group bought Nelson Brothers and Tōmoana, though still traded as Nelsons. Vesteys opened a 4-storey slaughter house in 1924. The 3 February 1931 earthquake damaged the main block and the freezers, but by 1 June 1931 Tōmoana was back to full capacity. In 1932 new chains improved efficiency, but caused a long strike. From 1933 Tōmoana produced its own casks and barrels and boxes from 1939. A 1941 fire destroyed a cold store. From 1958 tallow was put in 44 gallon drums and from 1962 carboard cartons replaced boxes. On 17 September 1979 a fire stopped much production until late 1980. In late 1985 Nelsons New Zealand Limited became a wholly owned subsidiary of Weddel-Crown Corporation Limited, owned by W & R Fletcher New Zealand Limited and Crown Corporation and took over Whakatu. Vesteys again took over from Crown and the company became Weddel New Zealand Limited, known as Weddel Tōmoana Limited. On 25 August 1994, it became insolvent and Tōmoana was sold to Heinz Wattie. Part of the site became Tōmoana Food Hub, with a warehouse built in 2003 for Heinz Wattie.

== Tōmoana railway station ==
Karamu railway station opened on 12 October 1874, as a 7th class flag station, with the first section of the Palmerston North–Gisborne Line, the 18.8 km (11.7 mi) Napier-Hastings section. On 24 January 1881 the name Karamu was changed to Tōmoana; next month an editorial said, "The station was named Karamu by the railway authorities, and a board intimated as much to passengers. The board remained for some days, when the Maoris took it down and put another bearing the name of Tomoana." On 12 October 1883 Nelson Brothers applied for a private siding. Just over a year later, on 1 December 1884, they asked for reduced rates and extra trains to carry meat from Tōmoana to the wharves at Napier. In 1883 the siding added £929 to railway revenue. By 1896 Tōmoana had a station building, passenger platform and a passing loop for 62 wagons. From 7 July 1899 parcels and small lots of goods could be booked to and from the platform and in 1901 it became a public siding. By September 1897 there was also a shelter shed, which was probably removed in the 1950s. Hawkes Bay Agricultural & Pastoral Society opened a siding, with a loop and north and south backshunts, on 4 December 1924. Three tracks remain at the station. A Bagnall 0-6-0T, built in 1932 to shunt the works trains, is now at Glenbrook Vintage Railway. The station is 7 m (23 ft) above sea level.

	Former adjoining stations	
Hastings; Line open, station closed 2.52 km (1.57 mi) towards PN	Palmerston North–Gisborne Line	Whakatu; Line open, station closed 4.68 km (2.91 mi) towards Gisborne

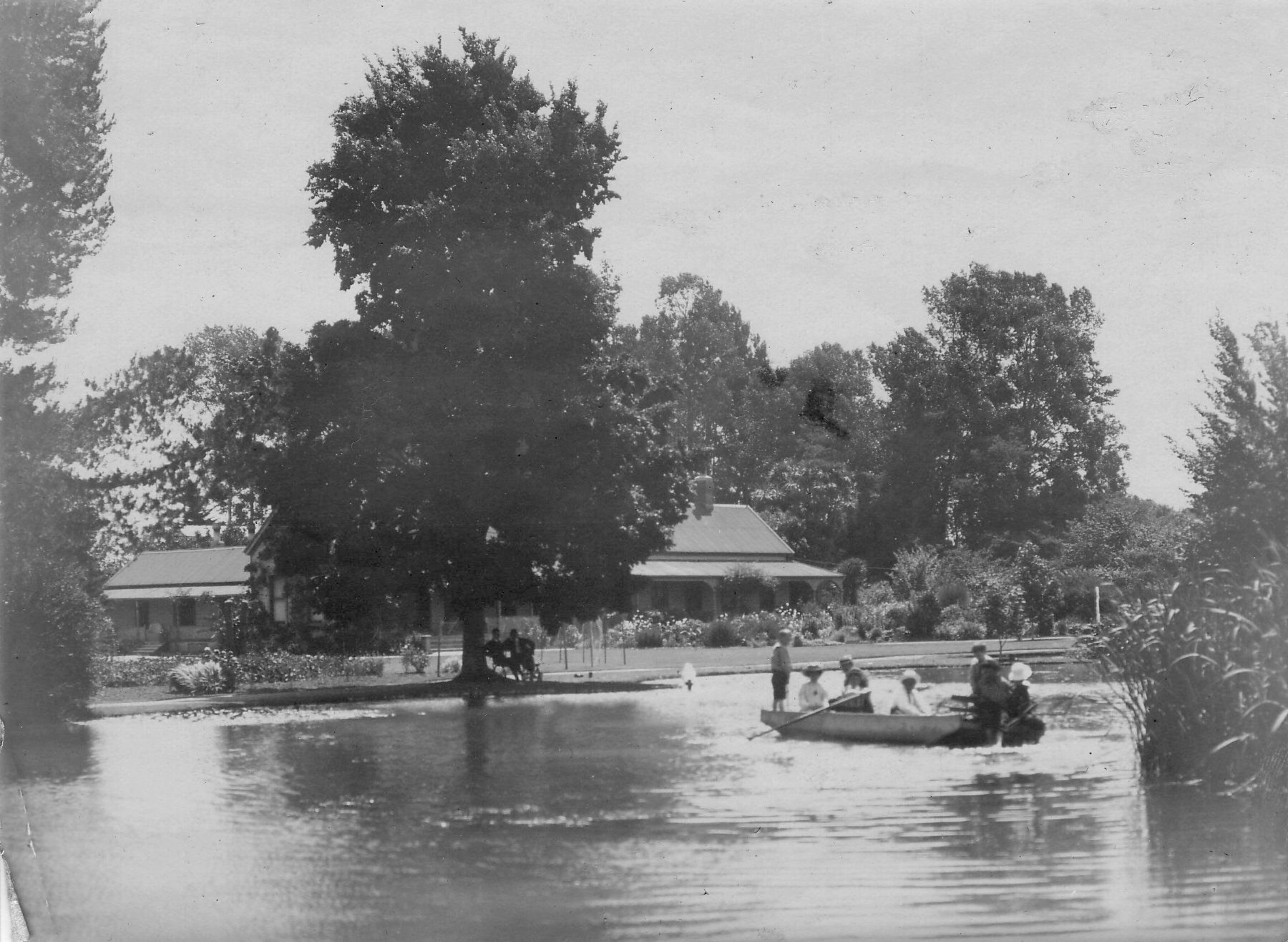
Waikoko house and lake about 1926

== Tōmoana Showgrounds ==
On the south side of the railway, James Nelson Williams sold 200 acres (81 ha) to Robert Wellwood in 1870. He built a house he named Maxwell Lea and started planting English trees. He sold it to William Nelson in 1884. It was renamed Waikoko (calm water) and gardens and a lake were formed. The 10-bedroom house burnt down in 1976, probably due to an electrical fault. A wisteria tree, which formerly covered the house, survived the fire.

In 1911 Hawke's Bay Agricultural & Pastoral Society bought land from William Nelson and moved shows here in 1925. Waikoko was added in 1933, bringing the area to 100 acres (40 ha). The grounds are now run by the District Council and have a large exhibition hall and a weekly Hawke's Bay Farmers' Market.
