= Harold Russell (politician) =

New Zealand farmer, sportsman, and politician

The Honourable Harold Russell

Member of the New Zealand Legislative Council
- In office 22 June 1934 – 14 July 1938

Personal details
- Born: Harold Arthur Russell; 29 January 1871 Flaxmere, Hawke's Bay, New Zealand
- Died: 14 July 1938 (aged 67) Twyford, Hawke's Bay, New Zealand
- Spouse: Eva Nelson (m. 1897–1935)
- Relations: William Russell (father); William Nelson (father-in-law); Andrew Hamilton Russell (uncle)
- Education: Lincoln Agricultural College
- Occupation: farmer, politician
- Profession: farmer

Harold Arthur Russell (29 January 1871 – 14 July 1938) was a New Zealand farmer, sportsman, and politician.

== Early life ==
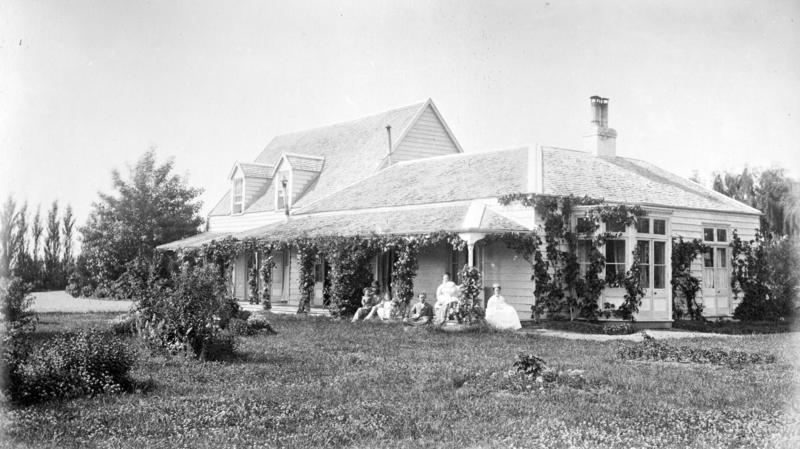
Flaxmere homestead in Hawke's Bay, 1875

Russell was born at Flaxmere homestead in 1871. He was the eldest son of Sir William Russell. Flaxmere homestead was his father's estate north-west of Hastings. He was educated at Heretaunga School, Bradfield College, Berkshire, and later at Lincoln Agricultural College, Canterbury.

== Professional career ==
He operated the Russell family farm, at Sherenden (near Hastings), and also managed the Flaxmere Stud Farm in Hawke's Bay. An active horseman, he was the captain of the Hawke's Bay polo team leading them to win the Savile Cup (the premier polo trophy in New Zealand) in 1907, 1909, 1910, 1911, and 1912. On the death of his father in 1913, he succeeded him as a director of stock and station agency Williams & Kettle. When Nathaniel Kettle retired from that business in 1932, Russell became the chairman of directors.

== Political career ==
Russell chaired the Te Aute College board in 1923 and 1924. In the same two years, he was a member of the Licensing Committee. He held memberships of the Hawke's Bay County Council, the Napier Harbour Board, and the Napier High School board.

He was a member of the New Zealand Legislative Council from 22 June 1934 to 14 July 1938, when he died. He was appointed by the United/Reform Coalition Government.

== Family and death ==
In 1897, Russell married Eva Nelson, the daughter of Hawke's Bay industrialist William Nelson.

On his father's death in 1913, he inherited Little Flaxmere, a house built by his father in 1900. It was originally a little cottage built on the large Flaxmere estate, and named after the homestead where he was born. After his death, Little Flaxmere was sold to the Walker family in 1940. Little Flaxmere is located in Twyford.

His wife died in 1935. On 14 July 1938, he died at his residence, Little Flaxmere, after a short illness, and was survived by five children.

In 1964, much of the land originally owned by his father was amalgamated into Hastings City Council. The council used the land for a residential subdivision and called the suburb Flaxmere.
