= Pakipaki =

- Rural community
- Interactive map of Pakipaki
- Coordinates: 39.691°S 176.794°E
- Country: New Zealand
- Region: Hawke's Bay Region
- Territorial authority: Hastings District
- Ward: Kahurānaki General Ward; Takitimu Māori Ward
- Community: Hastings District Rural Community
- Subdivision: Maraekākaho subdivision; Poukawa subdivision
- Electorates: Tukituki; Ikaroa-Rāwhiti (Māori)

Government
  - Territorial Authority: Hastings District Council
  - Regional council: Hawke's Bay Regional Council
  - Mayor of Hastings: Wendy Schollum
  - Tukituki MP: Catherine Wedd
  - Ikaroa-Rāwhiti MP: Cushla Tangaere-Manuel

Area
  - Total: 6.86 km^{2} (2.65 sq mi)

Population (2023 Census)
  - Total: 387
  - Density: 56.4/km^{2} (146/sq mi)
- Postcode(s): 4172, 4178

Pakipaki also known as Te Pakipakitanga a Hinetemoa, is a pā kāēnga village and rural community in the Hastings District and Hawke's Bay Region of New Zealand's North Island. The village is home to many Ngāti Whatuiāpiti hapū tribes represented by their three marae of Houngarea, Mihiroa, and Taraia. The village is also the home of the Hawke's Bay Catholic Māori Mission and displays the Foundation Stone for the Catholic Church in Hawke's Bay. Pakipaki is a Sacred Space in the Footsteps of Venerable Suzanne Aubert.

It is located at the intersection of State Highway 2 and State Highway 50A, south-west of Hastings and Havelock North.

== Geology ==
Pakipaki is located on the southern margin of the Heretaunga Plains, a tectonically active region shaped by millions of years of geological processes. The landscape and subsurface geology of Pakipaki reflect the interplay of tectonic subsidence, sedimentation from ancient rivers, and repeated sea-level changes associated with glacial and interglacial cycles.

=== Geological Setting and Stratigraphy ===
The Heretaunga Plains, including Pakipaki, are underlain by a thick sequence of Quaternary sediments that have accumulated over the last 2 million years as the region subsided along fault lines. This subsidence created a broad, low-lying basin that has been repeatedly filled and reworked by marine and riverine processes. Beneath Pakipaki, the stratigraphic sequence includes alternating layers of gravel, sand, silt, and clay, deposited during cooler glacial periods when rivers carried large amounts of coarse material, and finer sediments deposited during warmer interglacial periods when sea levels were higher and river gradients lower.

At depth, the plains are underlain by older Tertiary rocks, including Pliocene limestones and sandstones, which form the hilly country to the west and south of Pakipaki. These rocks dip gently northeast and are often capped by younger Quaternary marine or non-marine sediments. Petroleum well data and boreholes in the region have encountered Miocene-aged sandstone, mudstone, and limestone at depths of up to 1000 meters, with Pliocene rocks at around 300–500 meters below the surface.

=== Surface Geology and Soils ===
The surface geology of Pakipaki is dominated by alluvial deposits-gravel, sand, and silt-laid down by the ancestral Ngaruroro and Tukituki rivers as they meandered across the plains. These deposits are relatively young, dating from the Holocene epoch (the last 10,000 years), and are characterized by their fertility and versatility for agriculture. However, the area is also subject to periodic flooding and waterlogging, reflecting its low elevation and the presence of poorly drained soils.

Pakipaki is particularly known for its silt loam soils, commonly referred to as "Pakipaki silt loam." This soil type is recognized for its fine texture, moderate drainage, and high natural fertility, making it valuable for cropping and pastoral farming. However, the flat terrain and fine-grained nature of these soils also make them susceptible to compaction, erosion, and flooding, especially during periods of heavy rainfall or high groundwater levels.

=== Hydrogeology ===
Underlying Pakipaki and the wider Heretaunga Plains is a significant artesian aquifer system, which supplies water to Hastings, Pakipaki, and surrounding districts. The aquifer is recharged by rainfall and river infiltration in the western hills, with groundwater moving through the permeable gravel and sand layers beneath the plains. Artesian wells in the Pakipaki area tap into this aquifer, providing a reliable source of high-quality water for domestic, agricultural, and industrial use.

=== Tectonics and Ongoing Change ===
The geology of Pakipaki continues to evolve due to ongoing tectonic activity along the Hikurangi subduction zone, which underlies the east coast of the North Island. This tectonic setting causes periodic uplift, subsidence, and faulting, influencing river courses, groundwater flow, and sedimentation patterns across the Heretaunga Plains. As a result, the geology beneath Pakipaki is a dynamic record of both ancient and modern earth processes, shaping the land and its resources.

== History ==
The modern pā kāinga village of Pakipaki was founded in the 1860s by the rangatira chief Urupene Pūhara with the first town plan laid out in 1862. The village was established on the banks of the Awanui River in the area known to be the settlement of the 16th century ancestress Hinetemoa. The full name of the village is the proverb Te Pakipakitanga-o-Hinetemoa.

The village initially had one whare house named Ngarengare, a hall named Houngarea, and a wooden church dedicated to Saint Luke, with a scattering of European style homes. The establishment of Pakipaki was the permanent settlement of Ngāti Whatuiāpiti, Ngāti Ngarengare, Ngāti Papatuamārō, Ngāti Te Rehunga, and Ngāti Tamaterā to their ancestral land following 40 years of displacement during the Musket Wars, exile to Te Māhia, and repatriation to Heretaunga from 1840.

Through the 1860s, land surrounding Pakipaki was purchased by the Crown Land Agent, which saw the alienation of Hapū from the surrounding hills to settle in Pakipaki. The first hapū were Ngāti Hōtoa and their whare house Taraia. They were followed by Ngāti Mihiroa who built the whare house Mihiroa.

Pakipaki achieved growth in the 1860s and 1870s with the building of the Main Road, and then the railway in 1875. With the establishment of the railway and the building of a hotel nearby, Pakipaki became a centre for Māori politics, religious debate and significant gatherings.

=== Pakipaki Māori Brass Band ===
In the late 1800s the brass band movement had become popular among Māori and by the late 1880s funds were raised for the establishment of a Māori brass band. The band was known by the names of Heretaunga Māori Brass Band, Pakipaki Native Band, and Pakipaki Māori Brass Band. The band was a full complement of 26 players with their own instruments and uniforms ordered from England, along with a bandmaster as their tutor.

The band was a regular feature of Te Kotahitanga the Māori Parliaments and would accompany the Heretaunga contingents to the sittings of the Māori Parliament around the country through the 1890s.

Most notably the Ngāti Kahungunu contingent for the Māori Parliament left Napier in March 1898 for Rotorua via Auckland. On 3 March the band gave a promenade concert in the Albert Park under Mr Fred Clemens, bandmaster. The band arrived from Napier in the S.S. Tasmania and continued to Rotorua by train.

While on the Tasmania the band from Pakipaki enlivened the trip with frequent performances.Just as the Tasmania berthed at the Wharf, the band assembled on the top of the after-hole, and gave a musical selection in very good time.

At the Rotorua sitting of the Māori Parliament the band marched to meet and escort all visiting parties to the open space in the pā in front of the great carved house, Tama Te Kapua. Frequently the band discoursed select pieces, to the delight of all the residents and visitors; and also gave entertainments instrumental, song, dance, and haka to large and appreciative audiences.

On return to Auckland from Rotorua, the band gave a concert at Onehunga.

=== Māori Women's Christian Temperance Union ===
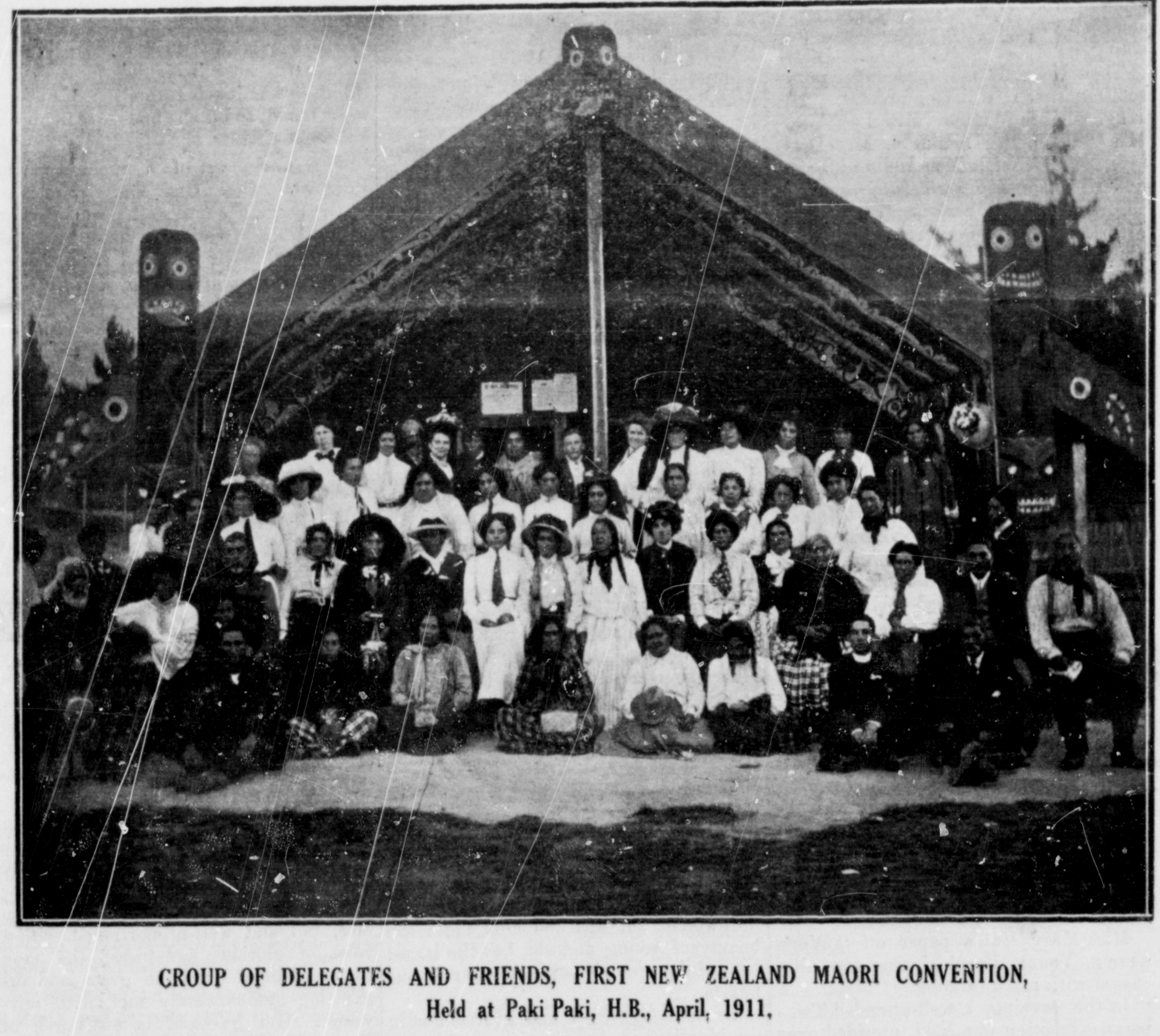

In April 1911, the first National Māori Women's Convention was held at Pakipaki under the auspices of the Women's Christian Temperance Union New Zealand (WCTU) to bring the many different temperance leaders together from all over the country. The WCTU NZ's journal The White Ribbon dedicated a bilingual issue to the proceedings at this convention. Sixty-five delegates representing seven Māori Unions and over four hundred visitors attended the dinner on the first of the convention's four days. Archdeacon David Ruddock of the Anglican Diocese of Waiapu presided over the opening church service in the Pakipaki Hall.

At this first convention the delegates decided to create a Māori District Union within the WCTU NZ rather than a separate national union. The delegates then elected Hera Stirling as president and Matehaere Arapata Tiria "Ripeka" Brown Halbert of Manutuke as vice president. At a public meeting on 19 April eleven men formed a Men's Committee to support the Hastings No-License League, one of these men was Mohi Te Ātahīkoia, who was the husband of Pukepuke Tangiora, president of the Pakipaki Branch of the Māori District Union.

Pukepuke Tangiora was known to discuss temperance outside Saint Luke's Church at the height of the temperance movement. Both Pukepuke Tangiora and Mohi Te Ātahīkoia laid the Foundation Stone for the WCTU in Napier on 30 August 1911 alongside Mrs Oldham and G W George William Venables, a local businessman who established the printing firm Venables & Co. in Tennyson Street, Napier.

== Pakipaki Marae ==
Pakipaki pā kāinga village has five historical marae sites, three of which are active Ngāti Kahungunu marae. In October 2020, the Government committed $6,020,910 from the Provincial Growth Fund to upgrade a group of 18 Heretaunga marae, including Houngarea, Taraia, and Mihiroa. Each marae represent their respective whānau families and hapū tribes at the governance table for Te Taiwhenua Heretaunga the Iwi Authority for Heretaunga Māori.

=== Houngarea Pā ===
Houngarea is the principal marae for Pakipaki, and Whare Rūnanga Tribal Council House for Ngāti Whatuiāpiti, Ngāti Ngarengare, Ngāti Papatuamāro, Ngāti Tamaterā and Ngāti Te Rehunga. Houngarea replaced the aging Ngarengare whare that once stood nearby, and is carved in the Te Arawa style by Te Ngaru Ranapia and Wharetutaki Rukingi of Ngāti Pikiao.

Houngarea was opened on 16 March 1916 and is a World War One memorial, and is gazetted as a National Marae. From the time Houngarea was opened, it became the marae to host the official farewell, and welcome home for the East Coast Contingents of the Māori Pioneer Battalion in World War One, and the 28th Māori Battalion in World War Two.

On one occasion in March 1917 Houngarea hosted the official welcome for Sir James Carroll, who had returned from England. After some days events 37 soldier recruits from the East Coast were farewelled as they marched to the Pakipaki Railway Station to travel to camp.

The internal back ridge post is painted with the flags of British Malta, Belgium and France. The wall is emblazoned with the flags of Britain, France and the Australian Merchant Navy above the date 1 June 1915, commemorating the building of Houngarea. The crossed swords of the New Zealand Army and the crossed taiaha and tewhatewha of the Māori Pioneer Battalion are also painted. The stylised figures of the poupou represent Māori soldiers.

The internal front ridge post is painted with the flags of New Zealand and the Russian Imperial Navy. The wall is emblazoned with the flags of Britain, France and the Australian Merchant Navy above the date 16 March 1916, commemorating the dedication and opening of Houngarea. The crossed swords of the New Zealand Army and the crossed taiaha and tewhatewha of the Māori Pioneer Battalion are also painted. The stylised figures of the poupou represent Māori soldiers.

‘Houngarea’, Hastings Standard, 15 March 1916:

A Tribune reporter paid a visit to Pakipaki today, where elaborate preparations are being made in connection with the ceremony of the opening of the new meeting house, Houngarea.

There will be a big reception tomorrow, when Natives from all parts of the Dominion will be present, it is expected that from 500 to 600 Maori will assemble. A large contingent will arrive tomorrow morning from Gisborne and Wairoa.

The chief ceremony will take place when the new meeting house will be formally opened. Large marquees have been erected for the accommodation of visitors, a special tent being set aside for notabilities. Fruit, refreshment and sweet stalls are on the grounds, and a marquee has been erected for entertainments. In the evenings the whole place will be illuminated by electricity. Special care has been devoted to sanitary arrangements, and a posse of police will have control of affairs generally.

The general management is in the hands of Rapihana Hawaiikirangi, Taranaki Te Ua, Ratima, and a strong committee of ladies. A luncheon room for Europeans has been provided, at which a charge will be made for meals. The takings will be devoted to the Wounded Soldiers' Fund.

Each evening there will be military, war canoe, aerial defence and Allied poi dances. The meeting house itself is a handsome and commodious structure, and beautifully carved —the work of Mr. Rukingi and son, of Rotorua. A pleasing feature of the internal decorations are the flags of the Allies painted on panels. This work was done solely by the ladies of the local tribe, and reflects great credit on their skill.

Despite its association with war, Houngarea aptly translates to 'resounding peace', in association with the whakatauāki proverbial saying of the 17th century Ngāti Ngarengare chief Ikahoungata:

'Ko Te Ihu, Ko Te Rae, Tikina Houhia Te Rongo' 'With our nose and our forehead brought together, peace shall prevail.'

==== Tāwirirangi Dining Hall ====
The Tāwirirangi Dining Hall was opened by Paul Reeves, Governor-General of New Zealand, on 16 March 1986 as a part of the 70th anniversary celebrations of Houngarea Whare Rūnanga. The dining hall replaced the previous Houngarea Hall.

==== Rapihana Hawaikirangi Monument ====
Rapihana Hawaikirangi oversaw the building of Houngarea and died suddenly on 30 October 1919, only three years after its opening. Rapihana was 60 years old and was one of the worthy sons of an illustrious line of chiefs, being a descendant of Whatuiāpiti and Kahungunu. He was a Grandson of Pūhara of Heretaunga and Pitiera Kōpū of Wairoa. He was loyal to his elders and worked for the welfare of the people and the good of his country. His last words to his people were Cling to the faith, the Lord is our refuge and strength, the very present help in time of trouble.

==== Houngarea Memorial Gates ====
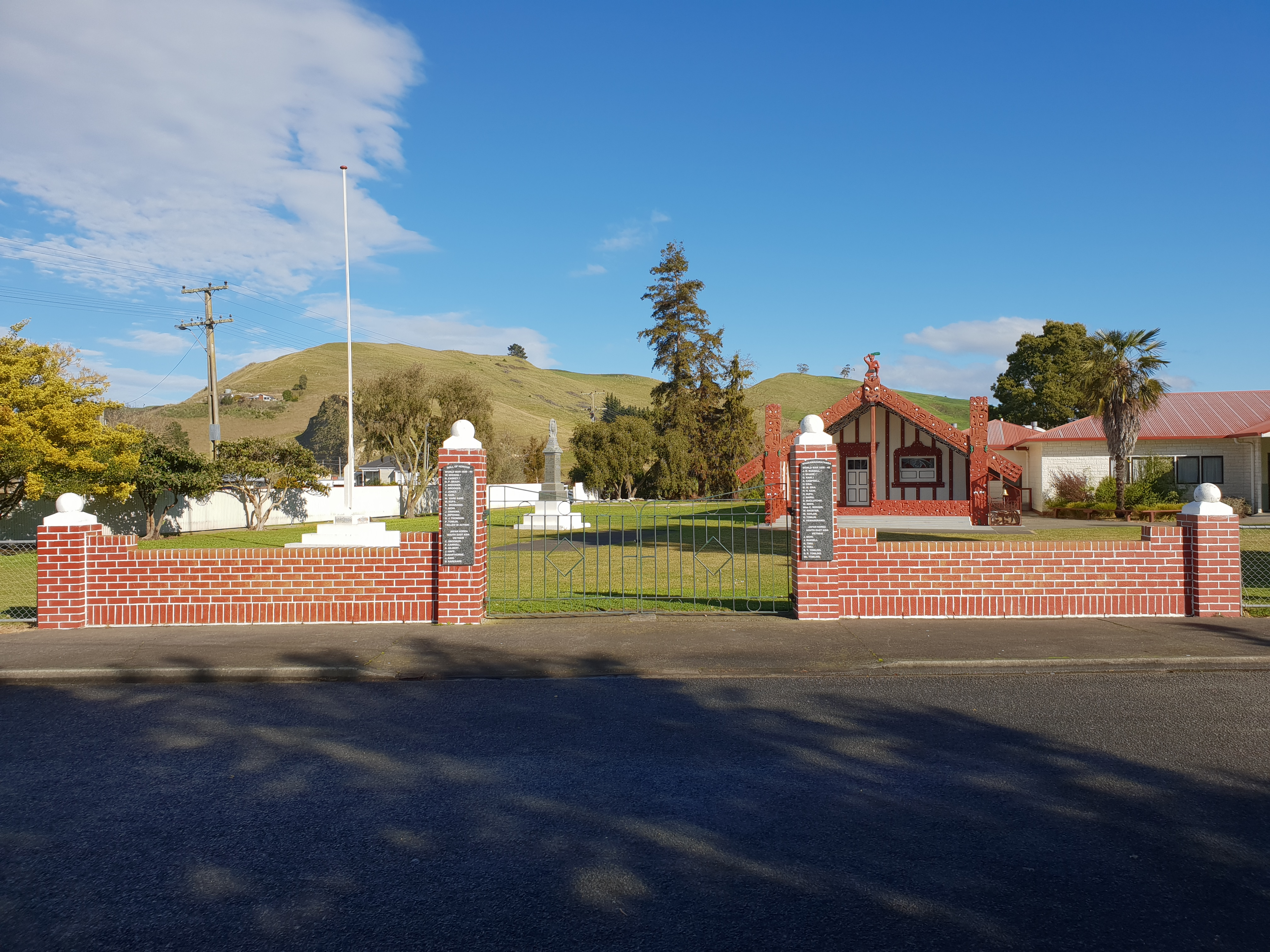
Houngarea Pā, Pakipaki

The Houngarea Marae memorial gates were dedicated in 1946 by Lieutenant-General Bernard Fryberg as a Second World War memorial.

When State Highway Two was realigned, the gates were dismantled and re-erected in their present position. They were rededicated on Anzac Day 1972 by Colonel Brian Poananga and the Minister of Māori Affairs, Duncan MacIntyre.

In 2007 the Houngarea Marae Committee added new plaques naming those from Pakipaki who served in South-east Asia.

The gates are cast-iron, painted in crawford green, supported by a red brick wall and surmounted by four white concrete orbs on four brick pillars. Each side of the gates holds a black granite plaque with a Remembrance Roll for enlisted service people from Pakipaki that have served overseas, with war dead being marked by a cross.

==== Houngarea Memorial Flag Pole ====
The Houngarea flagpole is a memorial to Johnson Whare and James Roach Russell, both of whom were killed in action in Crete on 23 May 1941.

The flagpole was dedicated in 1942 and flies the New Zealand Red Ensign.

==== Gifting of E Pari Rā as Official Slow March of the Royal New Zealand Navy ====
On 18 October 1968, the Tōmoana whānau gifted the waiata of Paraire Tomoana, E Pari Rā, to the Royal New Zealand Navy at Houngarea, after the consecration of the new Bishop of Aotearoa, Reverend Manu Augustus Bennett. After the gifting presentation, the Navy Band marched up and down the marae playing the waiata as their official slow march for the first time.

Before sitting down to a sumptuous meal, Commodore Carr expressed thanks to the Tōmoana whānau for allowing the use of E Pari Rā, and presented a plaque to Ybelle Huata (née Tōmoana) along with a Red Ensign to Houngarea Marae. Carr declared that the lament would receive the greatest respect and would be an integral part of the music played on ceremonial occasions.

=== Taraia Marae ===
Taraia marae and whare house is a meeting place of Ngāti Hōtoa and Ngāti Taraia. Taraia is one of the oldest whare houses of the Heretaunga District and has an illustrious history spanning 200 years. The whare house originally stood atop Kōhinerākau Mt Erin and was moved twice before finally being moved and re-erected at Pakipaki. Taraia is significant for its age and was originally built in the traditional style without European tools, eventually gaining a European door and window. Taraia whare house has been restored a number of times, and although it now has a corrugated iron roof, until the 1970s the whare still maintained its nikau roof.

=== Mihiroa Marae ===
Mihiroa marae and whare tupuna ancestral house is a meeting place of Ngāti Mihiroa. The original whare of Mihiroa was situated on Te Taumata ō Mihiroa, at the conjunction of Middle Road and Crystal Street. Mihiroa was the main whare of Pukepuke Tangiora, and remains in the hands of her uri.

== Religion ==
Pakipaki is an ecumenical community represented by many faiths. The predominant denominations of Christianity of Pakipaki whānau families are Katorika Māori o Te Ritenga Romana Catholic Māori of the Roman Rite, Hāhi Mihingare Church of England, and the Rātana Movement.

=== Hawke's Bay Catholic Māori Mission and Venerable Suzanne Aubert ===
The Catholic faith was first introduced to Ngāti Whatuiāpiti chief Pūhara Hawaikirangi in Māhia in 1840. Pūhara is acknowledged as the Māori Benefactor of the first Catholic Mission in Hawke's Bay, which was established at Pakowhai by the Society of Mary (Marists). Following the death of Pūhara during the Pakiaka Skirmishes of 1857-58 the Marist Priests moved to land thy had purchased at Meeanee, and the Māori Mission fell into abeyance until the arrival of Mēri Hōhepa Venerable Suzanne Aubert at Port Ahuriri from Auckland aboard the S.S. Lord Ashley on 15 February 1871. Suzanne was 35 years of age.

Already eleven years in New Zealand, and accustomed to Northland Māori, her arrival to Hawke's Bay was to signal a new chapter in her life as a missionary, nurse, chemist, teacher, and linguist. Suzanne very quickly established a respected and trusted presence across Heretaunga-Ahuriri. At about this time, she was the only full-time Māori Missioner in the Diocese of Wellington, and the first District Nurse for Hawke's Bay Māori, caring for over 1,300 people in one year. In Hawke's Bay Suzanne Aubert is affectionately known as Mēri Hōhepa Mary Joseph.

The most notable feature of her work during these years was her constant visiting of hapū tribes, when she walked thousands of miles where no European man would venture alone. She succeeded in baptising over 200 Māori children who were dying, and cured many others of western illnesses.

Mēri Hōhepa wore neither religious habit nor ordinary dress. She appeared in a grey skirt and plain-fitting blouse, a cape that reached to her waist, and a straw hat with a gossamer veil. Under the skirt were large detachable pockets, which she called her saddlebag, tied round her waist. In one pocket, she carried prayer books, and in the other pocket, she carried bread and cheese. Thus attired and provisioned she walked an average of 100 miles a week, covering the whole of Hawke's Bay. She went wherever there were Māori to be instructed, or sick to be nursed be it Māori or European.

While in Hawke's Bay Mēri Hōhepa focused her skills in rongoā Māori herbal lore, botany, and chemistry to extract the medicinal properties of native plants incorporating science and traditional Māori knowledge. Mēri Hōhepa could regularly be seen walking the shores of the old Te Whanganui-a-Orotū Ahuriri Inner Harbour and wetlands of Pakipaki, learning the medicinal uses of native plants from the old and wise, returning to Meeanee to experiment with herbal remedies.

Mēri Hōhepa was entrusted with revising and enlarging the Māori prayer book Ko te Ako me te Karakia o te Hāhi Katorika Romana, a two-year project, after which she had 300 copies printed in Napier at her own expense. In anticipation of the arrival of Father Soulas, Mēri Hōhepa compiled an English-Māori dictionary and French-Māori phrase book, which she later published in 1885 as her New and Complete Manual of Māori Conversation. Mēri Hōhepa included general rules of grammar and an extensive vocabulary, which became the first publication on the Māori language, and the basis for the Māori dictionary of Sir Apirana Ngata.

For her final three years in Hawke's Bay, Mēri Hōhepa permanently resided in Pakipaki to strengthen the Mission there, with a schoolhouse and presbytery built alongside her little Church. While in Pakipaki, her efforts had been seen by a group from Whanganui visiting on a trading mission. Seeing the work done in Pakipaki, the Whanganui wanted the same for their own kainga home. The path was laid – by the people and the Bishop – for Mēri Hōhepa to travel to Hiruhārama to revive the Māori Mission there.

The entry in her Aide Memoire for 24 June 1883 simply states, “I am leaving Meeanee” Without formal farewells, Mēri Hōhepa left Hawke's Bay and on 2 July passed through the Manawatū Gorge on her way to Whanganui.

She would quote in her letter writing: “My 12 years in Hawke's Bay were the happiest time of my life.”

==== Church of the Immaculate Conception 1880 ====
Mēri Hōhepa Suzanne Aubert resided at Pakipaki 1879–1883. Her decision to reside in Pakipaki was a commitment to reviving the Māori Mission and building a church for the small Catholic community. In 1878, as a significant turning point for the fate of the Māori Mission, a hui was held at Pakipaki, hosted by the chief Urupene Puhara. The purpose of the hui was to discuss conversion to the Church of England at a time when the Anglicans had implemented an aggressive Māori church building policy, had clergy to serve Māori, and were baptising large numbers.

Under the shadow of the wooden Anglican Saint Luke's Church at Pakipaki, Mēri Hōhepa reminded Urupene of his father Pūhara Hawaiikirangi, the first benefactor of the Māori Mission at Pakowhai, who was baptised in his own blood on the battlefield of Pakiaka in 1857. Mēri Hōhepa goaded Urupene and he refused to convert and remained Catholic. Mēri Hōhepa kept her promises made to Urupene with the arrival of the French priest Christophe Soulas in 1879, and shortly afterwards, the opening and blessing of the little Church of the Immaculate Conception at Pakipaki on 8 June 1880. In addition to the subscriptions collected from Fr Soulas, Mēri Hōhepa personally financed and furnished everything needed for the new church and was very proud of it.

The church is built in a French Carpenters Gothic style and is unique for its high pitch ceiling and tall doors. The church was enlarged in the 1910s to a cruciform style with a sacristy and vestry wing added to each side of the building, and a chancel was added to enlarge the sanctuary. The church is registered with an Heritage NZ Category 1 listing and is currently in the process of being restored. The church was deconsecrated in the 1960s and was moved to make way for the erection of a new church in the post Vatican II style.

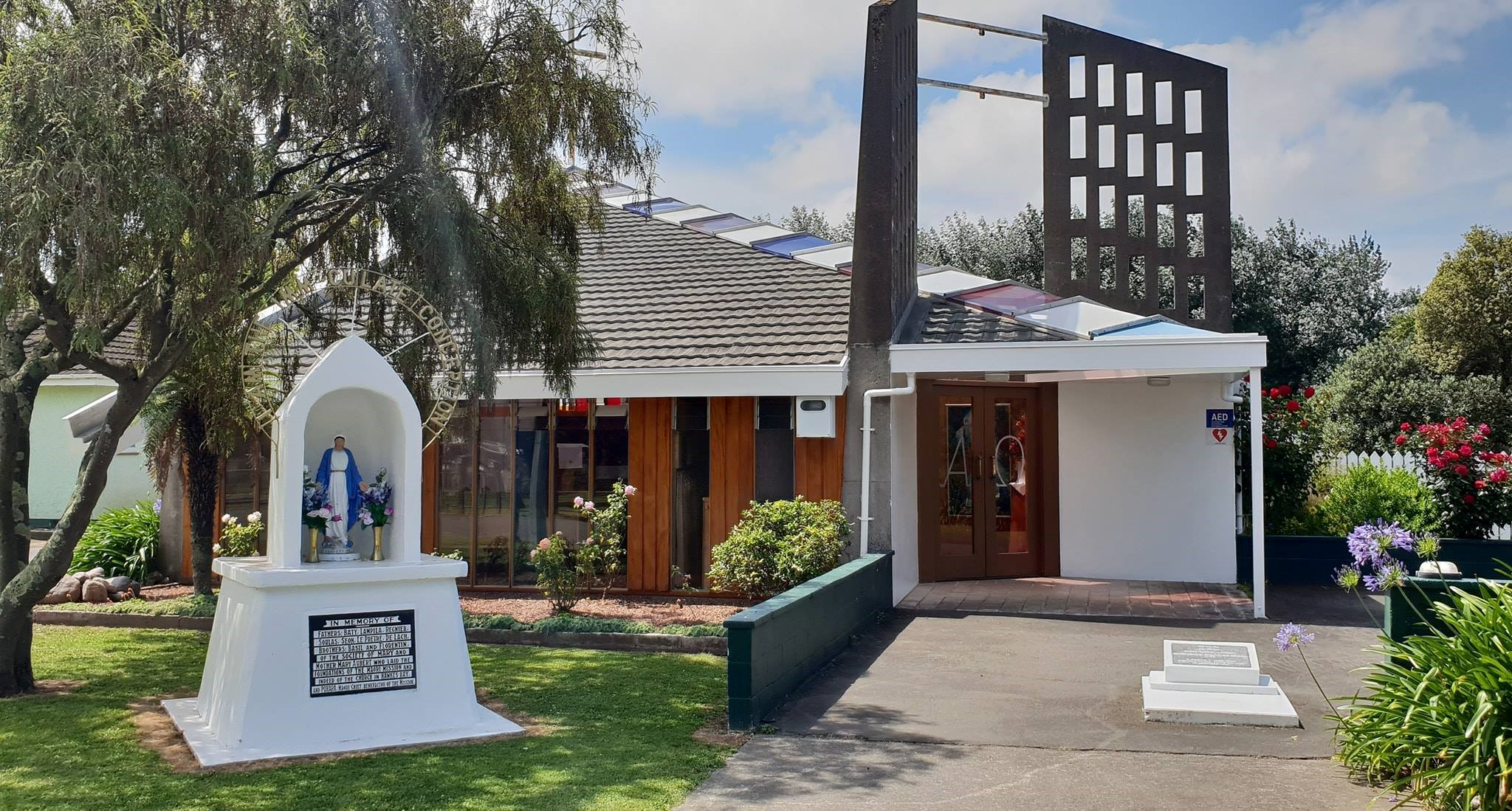
1968 Church of the Immaculate Conception

==== Church of the Immaculate Conception 1968 ====
The 1968 Church of the Immaculate Conception was designed by John Scott (architect) and built under the direction of Father Kerins of the Society of Mary, who was Superior of the Hawke's Bay Māori Mission at the time. The church is modelled off Futuna Chapel in Karori, Wellington, and was consecrated on 28 April 1968.

Outside the church stands the Memorial Grotto of Our Lady of the Immaculate Conception. The memorial grotto was commissioned in the 1950s by Father James Durning SM and was built under the supervision of local Lay Reader, James Kenrick. The memorial is a grotto for the Immaculate Conception of the Blessed Virgin Mary with an inscription dedicated to the foundation of the Roman Catholic Church in Hawke's Bay and the establishment of the Māori Mission at Pakipaki.

The Foundation Stone reads:

IN MEMORY OF

Fathers: Baty, Lampila, Regnier, Soulas, Séon, Le Pretre, De Lach.

Brothers: Basil and Florentin, of the Society of Mary

And Mother Mary Aubert, who laid the foundations of the Maori Mission and indeed of the Church in Hawkes Bay.

And Puhara, Maori Chief, Benefactor of the Mission.

Pūhara Hawaikirangi is the central figure in the story of the Catholic Church in Hawke's Bay and his son Urupene Pūhara is credited with the establishment of a permanent Māori Mission at Pakipaki and erection of the Church of the Immaculate Conception alongside The Venerable Suzanne Aubert and Father Christophe Soulas in 1880. A second plaque further acknowledges Marist priests and local benefactors:

Fr. James Riordan S.M. 1929-42.

And these other Benefactors of the Mission

Agnes Shaw Wilson : Agnes Murphy.

Eliza Sheehan : George Oswald Donovan.

Father Augustine Venning S.M. 1909-1962.

==== Ordination of first Catholic Māori priest ====
Born Wiremu Te Awhitu on 28 July 1914, he was professed on 13 February 1938 under instruction at Mount Saint Mary's Scholaticate. On 17 December 1944 he was ordained to the priesthood by Archbishop Thomas O'Shea at Saint Patrick's Church in Napier. As the first Māori to attain the office of the Catholic faith, Pā Te Awhitu effectively removed the criticism that Māori were not capable, or good enough, to reach such a standard.

Following the Ordination ceremony in Napier, the guests made their way to Houngarea Pakipaki where the guests were welcomed by Waimārama Pūhara OBE, Hakopa Tongariro, and Paraire Tomoana.

Pā Te Awhitu celebrated his first Mass on the porch of Houngarea Marae with over 300 Catholic Māori in attendance.

=== Pakipaki Anglican Māori Mission ===
Te Hāhi Mihingare The Anglican Church was established in Pakipaki with the first town plan laid in 1862. The first church was a wooden building built on the Main Road under the auspices of the chief Paramena Oneone, whose memorial stands in the church yard. The church served the Māori Anglican Mission at Pakipaki for 60 years when in October 1922 a meeting was held to discuss the erection of a new stone church adjacent to the wooden church.

The ōhāki lasting words of Paramena Oneone were:

Kia mau ki te karakia Be prayerful

Kia ū ki te whakapono Be faithful

Kia aroha tētahi ki tētahi Love one another.

==== Soldier's Memorial Church of Saint Luke's ====
The building of a new stone church for Pakipaki first appears in the records at a meeting on 26 October 1922 where a decision is made to build a church designed by Architect James Chapman-Taylor and built by local Master Stonemason Charles Goffin. A second meeting sees the addition of a tower to the design and contract awarded to Goffin and took nine months to build. The church is built from limestone taken from Tūhinapō (Napier Prison Quarry) and Pakipaki, and was carted by Goffin himself, who hand-cut each stone onsite.

The church was consecrated at 11:00am on 16 June 1923 by Bishop Dornakal Azariah of India. On the same day Bishop Frederick Bennett consecrated the entrance gates and supporting stone wall as a memorial to soldiers that died during the First World War. In his opening address, the chief Mohi Te Ātahīkoia explained that the long side of the wall is dedicated to Pākehā soldiers and the short side to Māori soldiers in recognition of the proportion of loss on both sides.

Flags of both the Axis and Allied Forces were on display, with a representative from the German Forces included among the Allied contingent.

Paraire Tomoana dedicated his July 1923 issue of He Toa Takitini to the opening of the new church.

== Education ==
=== Te Kura o Pakipaki ===
Te Kura o Pakipaki is a co-educational state primary school, with a roll of 56 as of March 2026. It opened as Pakipaki School in 1907 It was destroyed by fire in July 1922 and rebuilt by the end of the year.

=== Mihiroa Marae Training Centre ===
Mihiroa Marae operate a training centre that teaches traditional artforms of whakairo carving, rāranga weaving, and mahi toi craft arts.

== Demographics ==
Pakipaki covers 6.86 km^{2} (2.65 sq mi). It is part of the larger Longlands-Pukahu statistical area.

Historical population
Year	Pop.	±% p.a.
2006	354	—
2013	345	−0.37%
2018	387	+2.32%
2023	387	+0.00%

Pakipaki had a population of 387 in the 2023 New Zealand census, unchanged since the 2018 census, and an increase of 42 people (12.2%) since the 2013 census. There were 195 males, 195 females, and 3 people of other genders in 129 dwellings. 2.3% of people identified as LGBTIQ+. There were 66 people (17.1%) aged under 15 years, 81 (20.9%) aged 15 to 29, 174 (45.0%) aged 30 to 64, and 63 (16.3%) aged 65 or older.

People could identify as more than one ethnicity. The results were 55.8% European (Pākehā), 51.9% Māori, 10.1% Pasifika, 1.6% Asian, and 1.6% other, which includes people giving their ethnicity as "New Zealander". English was spoken by 96.1%, Māori by 19.4%, and other languages by 2.3%. No language could be spoken by 2.3% (e.g. too young to talk). New Zealand Sign Language was known by 0.8%. The percentage of people born overseas was 13.2, compared with 28.8% nationally.

Religious affiliations were 39.5% Christian, 0.8% Hindu, 11.6% Māori religious beliefs, 0.8% New Age, and 1.6% other religions. People who answered that they had no religion were 39.5%, and 7.8% of people did not answer the census question.

Of those at least 15 years old, 45 (14.0%) people had a bachelor's or higher degree, 165 (51.4%) had a post-high school certificate or diploma, and 102 (31.8%) people exclusively held high school qualifications. 33 people (10.3%) earned over $100,000 compared to 12.1% nationally. The employment status of those at least 15 was 144 (44.9%) full-time, 42 (13.1%) part-time, and 15 (4.7%) unemployed.

== Pakipaki Railway Station ==
Pakipaki was a station on the Palmerston North–Gisborne Line. The section from Hastings to Pakipaki opened on 1 January 1875, allowing trains to run the 18 mi 10 ch (29.2 km) to Spit. The line was one of those which brought about the problems for the international contractors, John Brogden and Sons, when the government criticised it for the delay in opening the line. Other contractors built the 60 ft (18 m) x 30 ft (9.1 m) goods shed, the station and the 5th class stationmaster's house. Paki Paki ceased being the temporary terminus, when the line to Te Aute opened on 16 February 1876. By December that year the goods shed had been moved to the new terminus at Waipukurau. Initially there were 4 trains a day in each direction. In 1884 Paki Paki was downgraded to a flag station. In 1896 Pakipaki had a shelter shed, platform and two short sidings. Shortly after, its goods shed was modified. Borthwick's freezing works opened in 1906, with a siding off the railway. In 1912 an automatic tablet exchanger was added to facilitate trains passing. The freezing works collapsed in the 1931 earthquake. The station closed in 1986 and the shelter was demolished.

	Former adjoining stations	
Poukawa; Line open, station closed 10.04 km (6.24 mi)	Palmerston North–Gisborne Line	Longlands; Line open, station closed 3.03 km (1.88 mi)

== Notable people ==
- Hinewehi Mohi ( Māori Musician )
- Heather Te Au-Skipworth ( Māori Politician )
