= Nelson Brothers Limited =

UK meat processing business

Nelson Brothers Limited meat processors and importers was incorporated in London in 1883 to purchase as of 1 July 1883 the meat works at Tomoana, Hawkes Bay. These boiling down and canning works erected in 1880 were run as Nelson Brothers and Co by William Nelson, his brother Frederick Nelson (1839–1908) and their partner, J N Williams later of Frimley, Hastings.

Double taxation forced the sale of the New Zealand works to Vestey and New Zealand Refrigeration Company in 1919. Thereafter, no longer operating a business, Nelson Brothers had become an investment vehicle and it was renamed Nelson Financial Trust Limited in 1927.

== Refrigeration of New Zealand meat for import to England ==
The flotation on the London share market was to raise capital to purchase machinery to extend the Nelson Brothers and Co business to include refrigeration of meat and other perishable produce. At the time of the flotation in 1883 the business was described as: sheep farmers, manufacturers of extracts of meat, preservers by canning of meat for exportation, manufacturers of tallow and edible fat and exporters of wool, sheepskins and hides.

=== Property ===
- Works site: Tomoana, a property of 102 acres freehold about 12 miles from the port Napier complete with sidings and railway direct to Napier, slaughter houses and sheep and stock yards.
- Sheep farm: Apley, Puketapu, 4,735 acres with accommodation for 15,000 sheep currently carrying 8,000 sheep and a herd of horned cattle.
- Land at Mangateretere East: near Tomoana about 2,000 acres mainly leasehold.

=== First directors ===
E Montague Nelson (1841–1919) of G Nelson, Dale and Co of Warwick
James Anning
Frederick Nelson (1839–1908)

William Taylor
Abraham Scott of the National Bank of Australasia

=== Expansion ===
Nelson Brothers Limited opened new freezing works at Waipukurau, Gisborne, Woodville and Spring Creek near Blenheim. Waipukurau was dismantled and about 1908 Woodville was sold to a bacon-curing company. Works were also opened at Hornby near Christchurch and Ocean Beach. Ocean Beach was sold to another London firm.

=== Group ===
On the death of chairman Sir Montague Nelson in 1919 these businesses belonged to the Nelson group.

- George Nelson, Dale and Co, gelatine manufacturers
- Nelson Brothers Limited* sold 1919
- Australian Chilling and Freezing Company
- Colonial Consignment and Distributing Company* sold 1919
- Central Queensland Meat Export Company
- Australian Estates and Mortgage Company
- Commonwealth and Dominion Line

== Sale ==
The Tomoana and Taruheru, Gisborne freezing works of Nelson Brothers Limited were purchased in early 1919 by Union Cold Storage which traded in New Zealand under the name W & R Fletcher Limited and was a subsidiary of Vestey Brothers Limited. Vestey Brothers already owned Auckland's Westfield Freezing works and similar works in Whangarei and before being permitted to buy Nelson Brothers was required to shut down its operation in Tokomaru Bay. The name of the buyer (Vestey) was kept secret until July 1919.

There were public complaints that Vestey continued to buy up freezing works and seemed to be part of The Chicago Meat Trust (Note: National Packing: Swift & Company, Armour & Company and Morris & Company. "Meatpackers' Trust Has Been Dissolved", New York Times, 21 July 1912) which had succeeded in driving down prices paid to meat producers in the United States. The same concerns had brought about sufficient unrest in Darwin for the Australian government to send warships there. The concern seemed to have arisen because to avoid double taxation Vestey had moved its tax domicile to Argentina in late 1915 but the owners insisted it remained a British company.

Nelson Brothers' Hornby freezing works was bought in 1920 by neighbouring New Zealand Refrigerating Company.
