= Geordie Richardson =

New Zealand merchant

George Edward Gordon Richardson (1835–1905) was a New Zealand merchant and ship owner. See Richardson & Co later part of Williams & Kettle. He was born in Hampton Wick, Middlesex, England in about 1835. John Davies Ormond became his brother-in-law through marrying his sister Hannah.
