= Harmoney =

Personal Lending service in Australia and New Zealand

- Type: Public
- Traded as: ASX: HMY
- ISIN: NZHMYE0001S5
- Industry: Personal finance
- Founded: Auckland, New Zealand (2013)
- Headquarters: Newmarket; Auckland, New Zealand
- Key people: David Stevens, CEO; Neil Roberts, CPO and Founder; Simon Ward, CFO; Brad Hagstrom, COO
- Products: Personal Loans
- Website: harmoney.co.nz; harmoney.com.au

Harmoney is an online direct personal lender that operates across Australia and New Zealand. The company was established in 2014 to introduce peer-to-peer lending to New Zealand. Harmoney provides personal loans and has issued NZD $2 billion worth of loans as of March 2021.

Launched in September 2014, Harmoney was the first licensed provider in New Zealand after peer-to-peer lending and crowdfunding were enabled on 1 April 2014, following the passing of new financial legislation in New Zealand.

Harmoney started with peer-to-peer lending; it ceased providing retail investors with new loans on 1 April 2020.

== History ==
Harmoney was founded in late 2013 by Neil Roberts who became CEO of the new company. Roberts is the largest share owner of Harmoney. Heartland Bank announced it had taken a 10% stake in the platform and provided a funding line in September, 2014.

Harmoney launched on 10 September 2014, after it had obtained a licence by the Financial Markets Authority on 8 July 2014. At that time, the company said it had NZD $100 million available to lend from four main investors including Heartland Bank.

Trade Me announced in January 2015 it had acquired a 15% stake for $7.7 million. Soon after, then-CFO Jonathan Klouwens joined Harmoney's board of directors. Icehouse (New Zealand based business incubator) holds a 2% stake.

In October 2019, Harmoney successfully completed a Series C funding round which raised AU$22.9 million (NZ$25 million) in capital from Australian private equity firm Kirwood Capital and a private institutional investor based in New Zealand. In addition, Harmoney implemented a AU$20 million (NZ$21.9 million) corporate debt facility with an Australian investment fund to bring the raising to AU$42.9 million (NZ$47 million). The corporate debt facility was to be used to expand Harmoney's customer base and debt warehousing programme.

In November 2020, Harmoney successfully completed a dual listing on the Australian ASX and New Zealand NZX stock exchanges.

== See also ==
- Peer-to-peer lending
- Comparison of crowd funding services
- Disintermediation
