= USS Kopara =

New Zealand cargo motor ship

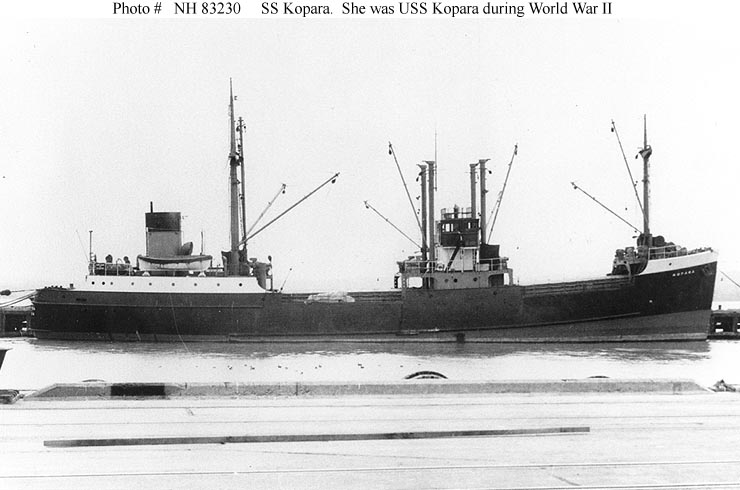

History
- Name: 1938: Kopara; 1966: Sarang; 1969: Cherry Chepat; 1984: See Hai Hong I
- Owner: 1938: Richardson & Co; 1966: Karlander Papua Pty Ltd; 1968: Madam Dolly Seah; 1970: Apollo Shipping & Trading; 1984: unknown
- Operator: 1942–45: (United States) US Navy
- Port of registry: 1938: (New Zealand) Napier; 1966: (Papua New Guinea) Port Moresby; 1968: Singapore; 1970: (Malaysia) Kuching; 1984: (Thailand) Songkhla
- Builder: Henry Robb Ltd, Leith
- Yard number: 288
- Launched: 30 July 1938
- Completed: September 1938
- Acquired: by US Navy, 21 September 1942
- Commissioned: by US Navy, 23 September 1942
- Decommissioned: by US Navy, 12 January 1945
- Identification: UK official number 5193462; call sign ZMGP; pennant number (1942): AK-62, then AG-50
- Fate: Scrapped in 1987

General characteristics
- Type: cargo ship
- Tonnage: 679 GRT, 334 NRT
- Length: 193.1 ft (58.9 m)
- Beam: 35.8 ft (10.9 m)
- Draught: 18 ft 8 in (5.69 m)
- Depth: 11.6 ft (3.5 m)
- Decks: 1
- Installed power: 250 NHP
- Propulsion: 2 × screws, 2 × 4-cylinder diesel engines
- Speed: 12 knots (22 km/h)
- Armament: 4 × 40 mm Bofors guns

USS Kopara (AK-62/AG-50) was a cargo motor ship that was built in Scotland in 1938, spent much of its five-decade career in New Zealand ownership, and seems to have been scrapped in the 1980s. Between 1942 and 1945, Kopara served in the United States Navy, delivering supplies in the Pacific War. After the war, the US Navy returned her to her New Zealand owners, with whom she traded until 1966. From then until the late 1980s she passed through a series of owners in Papua New Guinea, Singapore, Malaysia and Thailand, who changed her name to Sarang, Cherry Chepat and finally See Hai Hong I.

== Building and early career ==
Henry Robb Ltd of Leith in Scotland built Kopara in 1938, launching her on 30 July 1938 and completing her that September. Her registered length was 193.1 ft (58.9 m), her beam was 35.8 ft (10.9 m) and her depth was 11.6 ft (3.5 m). Her tonnages were 679 GRT and 334 NRT.

Kopara had twin screws, each powered by a four-cylinder, single-acting, two-stroke diesel engine. Between them her twin engines were rated at 250 NHP and gave her a speed of 12 knots (22 km/h).

Kopara's first owner was Richardson & Co., who registered her in Napier, New Zealand. Her UK official number was 5193462 and her call sign was ZMGP.

== US Navy career ==
In early August 1942 the US Navy took over the ship via the New Zealand Government. On 21 September 1942 she was commissioned at Auckland as USS Kopara, at first with the pennant number AK-62. This was changed to AG-50 on 23 September.

Kopara left Auckland on 5 October for supply runs from Noumea, New Caledonia, and Espiritu Santo, New Hebrides, to Guadalcanal and Tulagi, Solomon Islands. Arriving at Noumea 9 October, she steamed on the 14th for Espiritu Santo to load supplies for the embattled US force on Guadalcanal. Loaded with torpedoes and general cargo and escorted by USS Nicholas, she departed 19 October. Kopara arrived Lunga Roads during midwatch 22 October and began unloading, which was completed that evening despite harassing gunfire from enemy shore batteries and a noon attack by Japanese dive bombers. Protected by Nicholas, Kopara departed Guadalcanal undamaged and returned to Noumea 27 October.

During the next few months, Kopara continued supply runs to the Solomon Islands; and, while she unloaded at Guadalcanal and Tulagi 13 through 15 November, US battleships, cruisers, and destroyers fought the enemy in two night naval battles off Savo Island. From 20 February to 26 June 1943, she carried cargo along the sea lanes between Auckland, Noumea, Efate, and Espiritu Santo. And from 11 July to 17 September she shuttled supplies between New Zealand and Norfolk Island.

After a voyage to the New Hebrides, Kopara left Noumea 10 November to resume supply duty in the Solomon Islands. She reached New Georgia 16 November; and, for almost 8 months, ranged the waters of Melanesia from Bougainville to New Caledonia bringing supplies to forces which loosened the enemy's hold on the Bismarck Archipelago and New Guinea. Returning to New Caledonia 7 August 1944, she began supply runs eastward out of Noumea. Between 10 August and 21 December she made four voyages to Fiji, American Samoa, and the Ellice Islands. She left Noumea 24 December and steamed via Norfolk Island to Auckland 3 January 1945.

== Post-war career ==
Kopara was decommissioned on 12 January and turned over to the New Zealand Joint Purchasing Board for return to her owner. She remained in Richardson & Co service until 1966, when Karlander Papua Pty Ltd bought her, renamed her Sarang and registered her in Port Moresby, Papua New Guinea. In 1968 a Madam Dolly Seah bought the ship and registered her in Singapore. In 1969 the ship was renamed Cherry Chepat. In 1970 the Apollo Shipping & Trading Sdn Bhd bought the ship and registered her in Kuching, Malaysia. In 1984 owners in Thailand bought her, renamed her See Hai Hong I and registered her in Songkhla. She was deleted from shipping registers in 1988.

== Military awards and honors ==
Kopara received one battle star for World War II service. Her crew was eligible for the following medals:

- American Campaign Medal
- Asiatic-Pacific Campaign Medal (1 star)
- World War II Victory Medal
