= Longlands, New Zealand =

Rural community in Hawke's Bay Region, New Zealand

Longlands
- Rural community
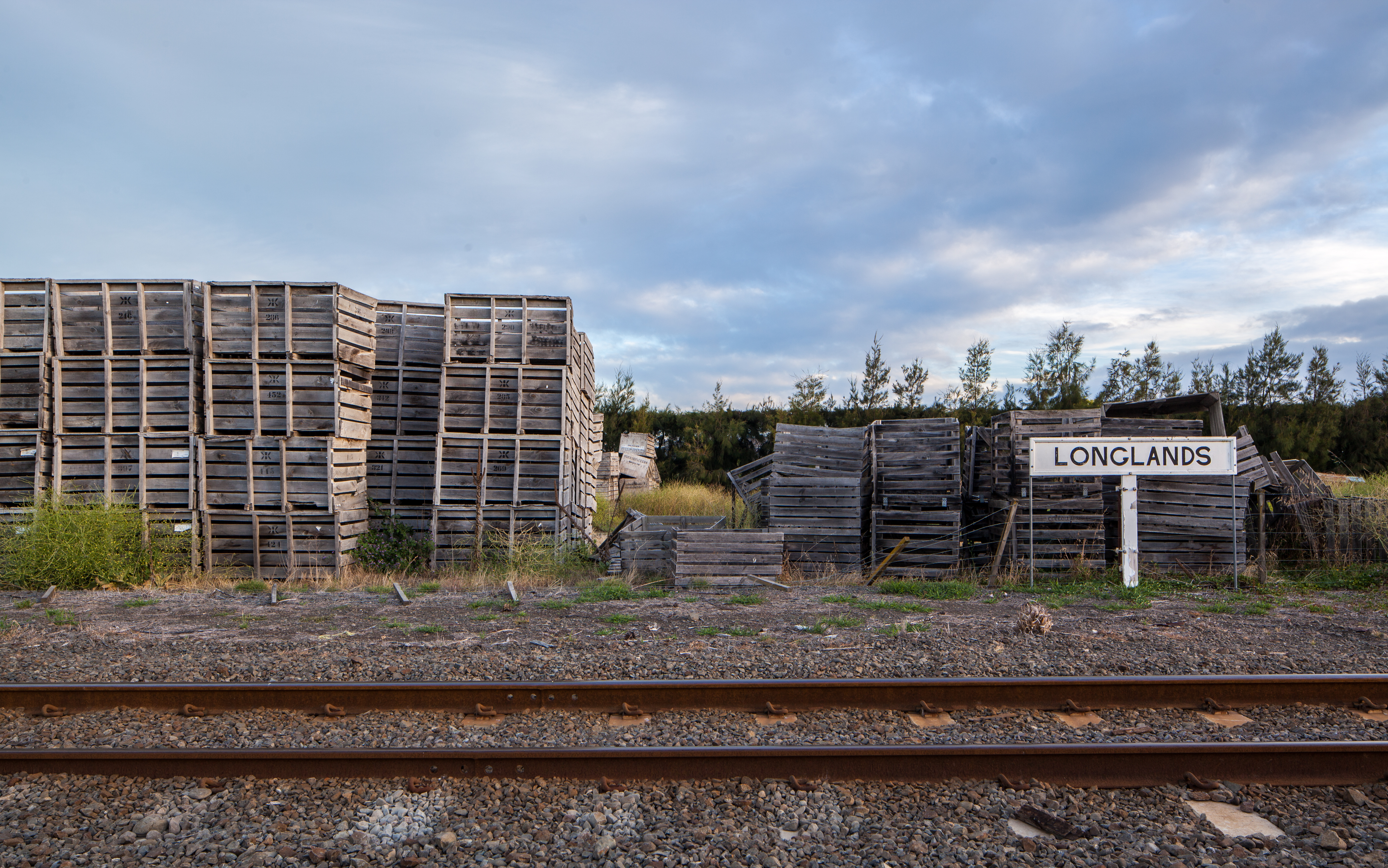
- Apple boxes at Longlands
- Interactive map of Longlands
- Coordinates: 39.660°S 176.834°E
- Country: New Zealand
- Region: Hawke's Bay Region
- Territorial authority: Hastings District
- Ward: Heretaunga General Ward; Kahurānaki General Ward; Takitimu Māori Ward
- Electorates: Tukituki; Ikaroa-Rāwhiti (Māori)

Government
  - Territorial Authority: Hastings District Council
  - Regional council: Hawke's Bay Regional Council
  - Mayor of Hastings: Wendy Schollum
  - Tukituki MP: Catherine Wedd
  - Ikaroa-Rāwhiti MP: Cushla Tangaere-Manuel

Area
  - Total: 38.85 km^{2} (15.00 sq mi)

Population (June 2025)
  - Total: 2,410
  - Density: 62.0/km^{2} (161/sq mi)
- Postcode(s): 4172, 4174, 4175, 4178

Longlands is a rural community in the Hastings District and Hawke's Bay Region of New Zealand's North Island. The area is on the southern and western outskirts of Hastings city.

The Longlands Estate occupied much of the land around 1880, but was broken up into smaller farms and a freezing works in the early 20th century.

The area is a centre for growing fruit and vegetables.

== Demographics ==
Longlands (including Irongate and Pakipaki), covers 38.85 km^{2} (15.00 sq mi) and had an estimated population of 2,410 as of June 2025, with a population density of 62 people per km^{2}.

Historical population
Year	Pop.	±% p.a.
2006	2,091	—
2013	2,022	−0.48%
2018	2,217	+1.86%
2023	2,322	+0.93%
The 2006 population is for a larger area of 39.55 km^{2}. Source:

Longlands had a population of 2,322 in the 2023 New Zealand census, an increase of 105 people (4.7%) since the 2018 census, and an increase of 300 people (14.8%) since the 2013 census. There were 1,233 males, 1,086 females, and 6 people of other genders in 786 dwellings. 2.2% of people identified as LGBTIQ+. There were 339 people (14.6%) aged under 15 years, 447 (19.3%) aged 15 to 29, 1,071 (46.1%) aged 30 to 64, and 465 (20.0%) aged 65 or older.

People could identify as more than one ethnicity. The results were 78.4% European (Pākehā); 20.3% Māori; 9.2% Pasifika; 3.4% Asian; 0.4% Middle Eastern, Latin American and African New Zealanders (MELAA); and 2.5% other, which includes people giving their ethnicity as "New Zealander". English was spoken by 96.9%, Māori by 6.3%, Samoan by 4.8%, and other languages by 6.8%. No language could be spoken by 1.4% (e.g. too young to talk). New Zealand Sign Language was known by 0.6%. The percentage of people born overseas was 19.5, compared with 28.8% nationally.

Religious affiliations were 41.7% Christian, 0.3% Hindu, 0.1% Islam, 2.2% Māori religious beliefs, 0.4% Buddhist, 0.4% New Age, and 1.7% other religions. People who answered that they had no religion were 47.4%, and 5.8% of people did not answer the census question.

Of those at least 15 years old, 372 (18.8%) people had a bachelor's or higher degree, 1,044 (52.6%) had a post-high school certificate or diploma, and 570 (28.7%) people exclusively held high school qualifications. 222 people (11.2%) earned over $100,000 compared to 12.1% nationally. The employment status of those at least 15 was 1,041 (52.5%) full-time, 291 (14.7%) part-time, and 51 (2.6%) unemployed.

Individual statistical areas
Name	Area (km^{2})	Population	Density (per km^{2})	Dwellings	Median age	Median income
Irongate	7.96	357	45	105	39.0 years	$38,400
Longlands-Pukahu	30.89	1,965	64	681	46.8 years	$42,200
New Zealand					38.1 years	$41,500

=== Railway station ===
Longlands flag station on the Palmerston North–Gisborne Line opened in 1912, after a deputation met the Minister of Railways, following the opening of a sheep and cattle yard in 1911. The line through Longlands, from Hastings to Paki Paki, had opened on 1 January 1875, the last works being to complete the bridge over the nearby Irongate Stream, formerly the Ngaruroro River. The piles of that bridge sank soon after construction. A shelter shed was built at Longlands in 1905, to the south of Longlands Road. In 1936 Longlands was a main centre for railing cattle. In 1947 frame levers at Longlands tablet locked siding were fitted with chains, staples, and a points lock. The station closed to all traffic on 18 May 1980, but a service siding was retained for about a decade.

	Former adjoining stations	
Pakipaki; Line open, station closed 3.03 km (1.88 mi)	Palmerston North–Gisborne Line	Hastings; Line open, station closed 4.31 km (2.68 mi)
