= Moutere Rugby Football Club =

The Moutere Rugby Football Club is a rugby union club based in Blenheim, Marlborough, New Zealand. It was founded in 1906 and has been the most successful rugby union club in the Marlborough province. It is based at Awarua Park in Spring Creek, about eight kilometres north of Blenheim. The club's playing colours are black and white hooped jerseys and white shorts.

Moutere was formed in 1906 following a reorganisation of club rugby by the Marlborough Rugby Football Union which split the province into evenly populated geographical areas. Before this date the club was called Awarua and the reason for the change of name to Moutere (Māori for "island") is a mystery.

Moutere fields teams at all levels of the Marlborough RFU competitions and has had a women's section since 2000 and a Golden Oldies team since the mid-1980s.

== Sources ==
- Stephens, Joy; Jones, Peter. "Marlborough Rugby - first 100 years". The Prow.
