= Hastings railway station, New Zealand =

Defunct railway station in New Zealand

Hastings
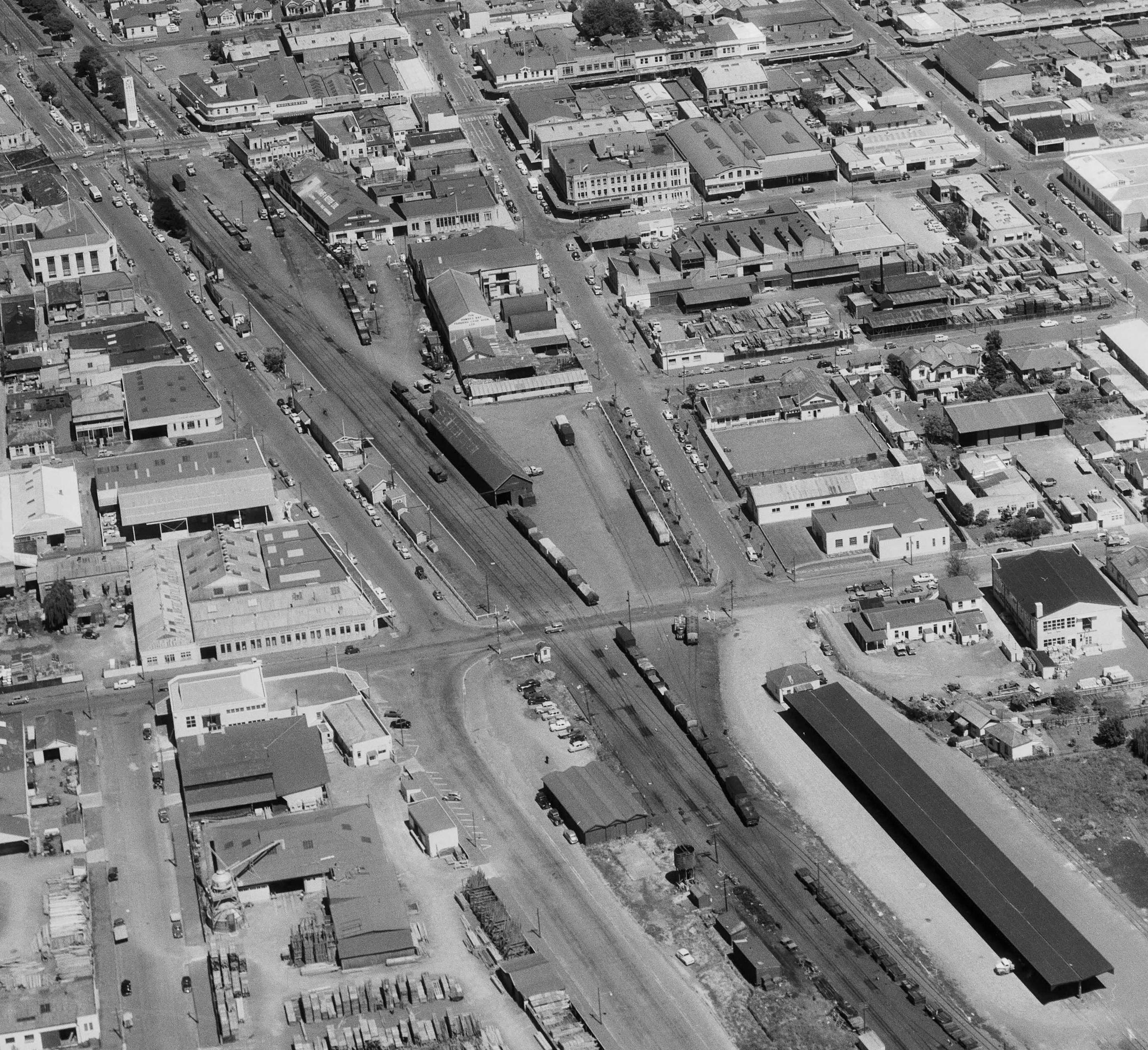
- Hastings in 1958

General information
- Location: Russell Street, Hastings; New Zealand
- Coordinates: 39.6391°S 176.8465°E
- Elevation: 12 m (39 ft)
- Owner: New Zealand Railways Department
- Line: Palmerston North–Gisborne
- Distance: Palmerston North 161.94 km (100.62 mi)

History
- Opened: 12 October 1874
- Closed: 7 October 2001 (passengers)

Services
| Preceding station | Historical railways | Following station |
|---|---|---|
| Longlands; Line open, station closed 4.31 km (2.68 mi) | Palmerston North–Gisborne Line; KiwiRail | Tōmoana; Line open, station closed 2.52 km (1.57 mi) |
Location

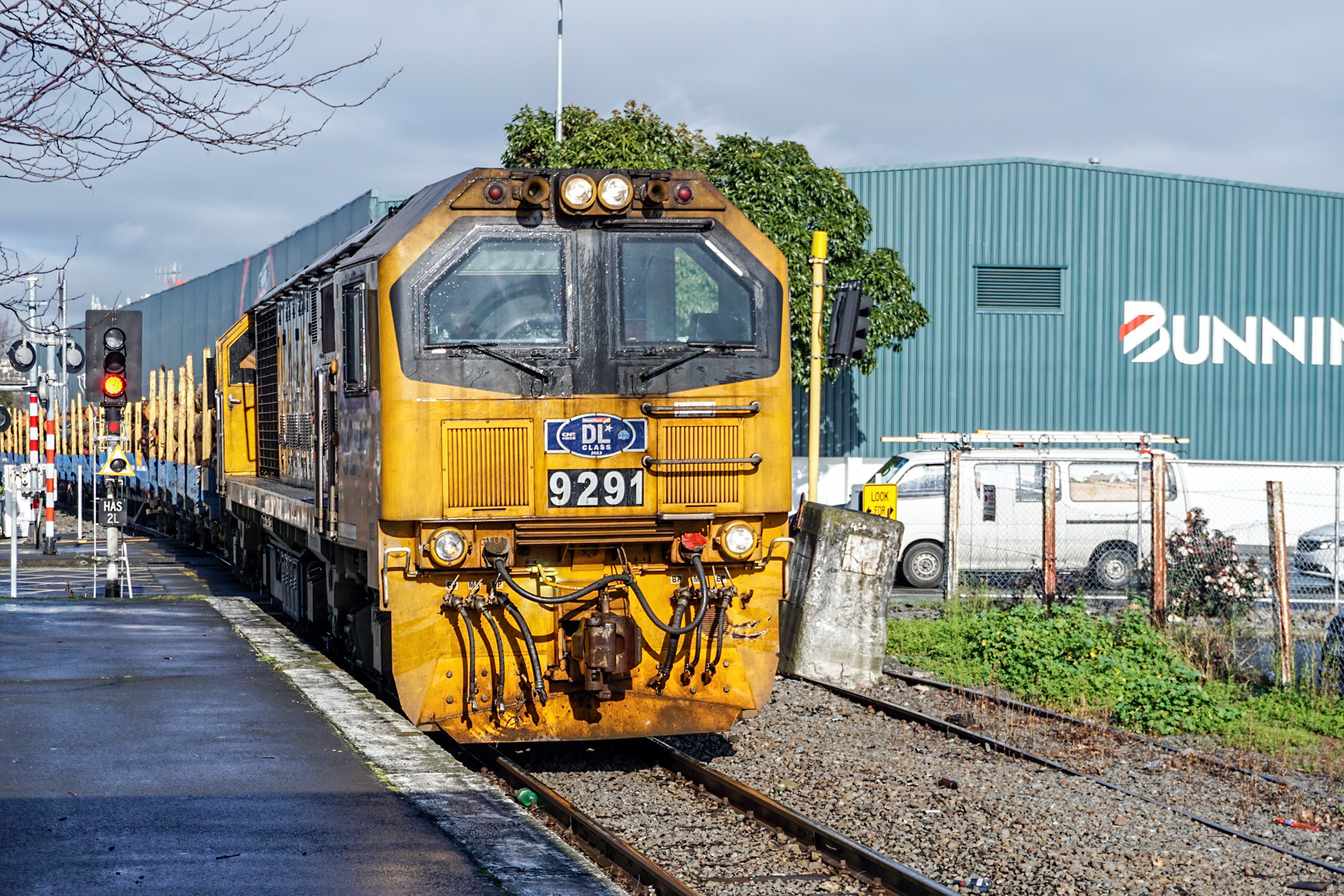
DL Class 9291 hauling a train of logs to Napier docks at Hastings on 23 August 2018

The Hastings railway station in Hastings, New Zealand is the main railway station in Hastings and an intermediate stop on the Palmerston North–Gisborne Line. The station is on the corner of Russell Street (which ran alongside the line) and St Aubyn Street, and is close to the centre of Hastings. It is no longer used by any regularly scheduled passenger services.

On 12 October 1874 the original station and the first section of the line south from Napier to Hastings was opened with special trains, a picnic and a band. On the day of the opening a gale blew the roof off the station house. The 4th class station was taken over from the international contractor, Brogdens, on 18 January 1875. The line gradually extended beyond Hastings, with completion on 9 March 1891 when it was opened through the Manawatū Gorge to Palmerston North and, hence, to Wellington.

From 1874 to 2001 numerous passenger trains serviced the station. These included local "mixed" trains that carried both passengers and goods between communities in the southern Hawke's Bay, and express trains from Wellington such as the Endeavour. The Bay Express was the last regularly scheduled service to use the station.

The annual returns show that the station was busy. For example, in 1924 Hastings sold 154.970 tickets and exported 35,380 sheep and pigs.

Passenger services ceased on 7 October 2001. The station building had stood empty since then, but is still visited by occasional heritage train excursions.

In the early hours of 21 September 2019 the building was set alight and burned to the ground. The remains were contaminated with asbestos and demolished.

The station was enlarged in the 1880s, so that by 1896 there was a 2nd class station, platform, cart approach, 100 ft (30 m) x 30 ft (9.1 m) goods shed, loading bank, cattle yards, engine shed, stationmaster's house, urinals and a passing loop for 44 wagons. A new station building and goods shed opened in 1962, the old 142 ft (43 m) x 32 ft (9.8 m) goods shed being removed in 1965.

Hastings Racecourse, 1 mi 47 ch (2.6 km) to the south, opened as a siding in 1882 and a platform was added in 1900.
