= Twyford, New Zealand =

Settlement in Hawke's Bay Region, New Zealand

Twyford
- Interactive map of Twyford
- Coordinates: 39°36′06″S 176°47′48″E
- Country: New Zealand
- Region: Hawke's Bay Region
- Territorial authority: Hastings District
- Ward: Heretaunga General Ward; Takitimu Māori Ward
- Electorates: Tukituki; Ikaroa-Rāwhiti (Māori)

Government
  - Territorial Authority: Hastings District Council
  - Regional council: Hawke's Bay Regional Council
  - Mayor of Hastings: Wendy Schollum
  - Tukituki MP: Catherine Wedd
  - Ikaroa-Rāwhiti MP: Cushla Tangaere-Manuel

Area
  - Total: 24.57 km^{2} (9.49 sq mi)

Population (June 2025)
  - Total: 780
  - Density: 32/km^{2} (82/sq mi)

Twyford is a district on the Heretaunga Plains in New Zealand, north-west of Hastings City. The area is an agricultural area with orchards, vineyards and cropping as the main source of income.

Twyford had a population of 1,062 at the 2013 New Zealand census, a decrease of 3 people since the 2006 census. There were 522 males and 540 females. 89.7% were European, 10.9% were Māori, 2.7% were Pacific peoples and 1.8% were Asian.

== Demographics ==
Twyford covers 24.57 km^{2} (9.49 sq mi) and had an estimated population of 780 as of June 2025, with a population density of 32 people per km^{2}.

Historical population
Year	Pop.	±% p.a.
2006	774	—
2013	651	−2.44%
2018	693	+1.26%
2023	774	+2.24%
The 2006 population is for a larger area of 26.01 km^{2}. Source:

Twyford had a population of 774 in the 2023 New Zealand census, an increase of 81 people (11.7%) since the 2018 census, and an increase of 123 people (18.9%) since the 2013 census. There were 453 males, 321 females, and 3 people of other genders in 186 dwellings. 2.3% of people identified as LGBTIQ+. The median age was 40.4 years (compared with 38.1 years nationally). There were 111 people (14.3%) aged under 15 years, 147 (19.0%) aged 15 to 29, 390 (50.4%) aged 30 to 64, and 129 (16.7%) aged 65 or older.

People could identify as more than one ethnicity. The results were 70.2% European (Pākehā); 13.6% Māori; 19.0% Pasifika; 4.7% Asian; 1.6% Middle Eastern, Latin American and African New Zealanders (MELAA); and 2.7% other, which includes people giving their ethnicity as "New Zealander". English was spoken by 92.2%, Māori by 1.9%, Samoan by 9.7%, and other languages by 10.1%. No language could be spoken by 1.2% (e.g. too young to talk). The percentage of people born overseas was 27.9, compared with 28.8% nationally.

Religious affiliations were 43.4% Christian, 0.8% Islam, 0.8% Māori religious beliefs, 0.8% Buddhist, 0.8% New Age, and 1.9% other religions. People who answered that they had no religion were 46.1%, and 6.6% of people did not answer the census question.

Of those at least 15 years old, 93 (14.0%) people had a bachelor's or higher degree, 336 (50.7%) had a post-high school certificate or diploma, and 240 (36.2%) people exclusively held high school qualifications. The median income was $38,800, compared with $41,500 nationally. 72 people (10.9%) earned over $100,000 compared to 12.1% nationally. The employment status of those at least 15 was 390 (58.8%) full-time, 99 (14.9%) part-time, and 6 (0.9%) unemployed.

== Education ==
Twyford School is a co-educational state primary school with classes for new entrants through to Year 8. It has a roll of 165 as of July 2025.

The school was established in 1912 by New Zealand Major General Sir Andrew Hamilton Russell KCB, KCMG, who originated from Hawke's Bay and became a farm manager at Twyford. He formed the Hawke's Bay Mounted Rifle Volunteers before a notable First World War career. After the War he became an MP, an honorary colonel, president of the NZRA, an inspector of military forces, and a founding member of the New Zealand Round Table. Russell had been an old boy of Twyford School, England, which was visited by the Principal of Twyford School New Zealand in 2010.
