= Spring Creek, New Zealand =

Town in Marlborough, New Zealand

Spring Creek
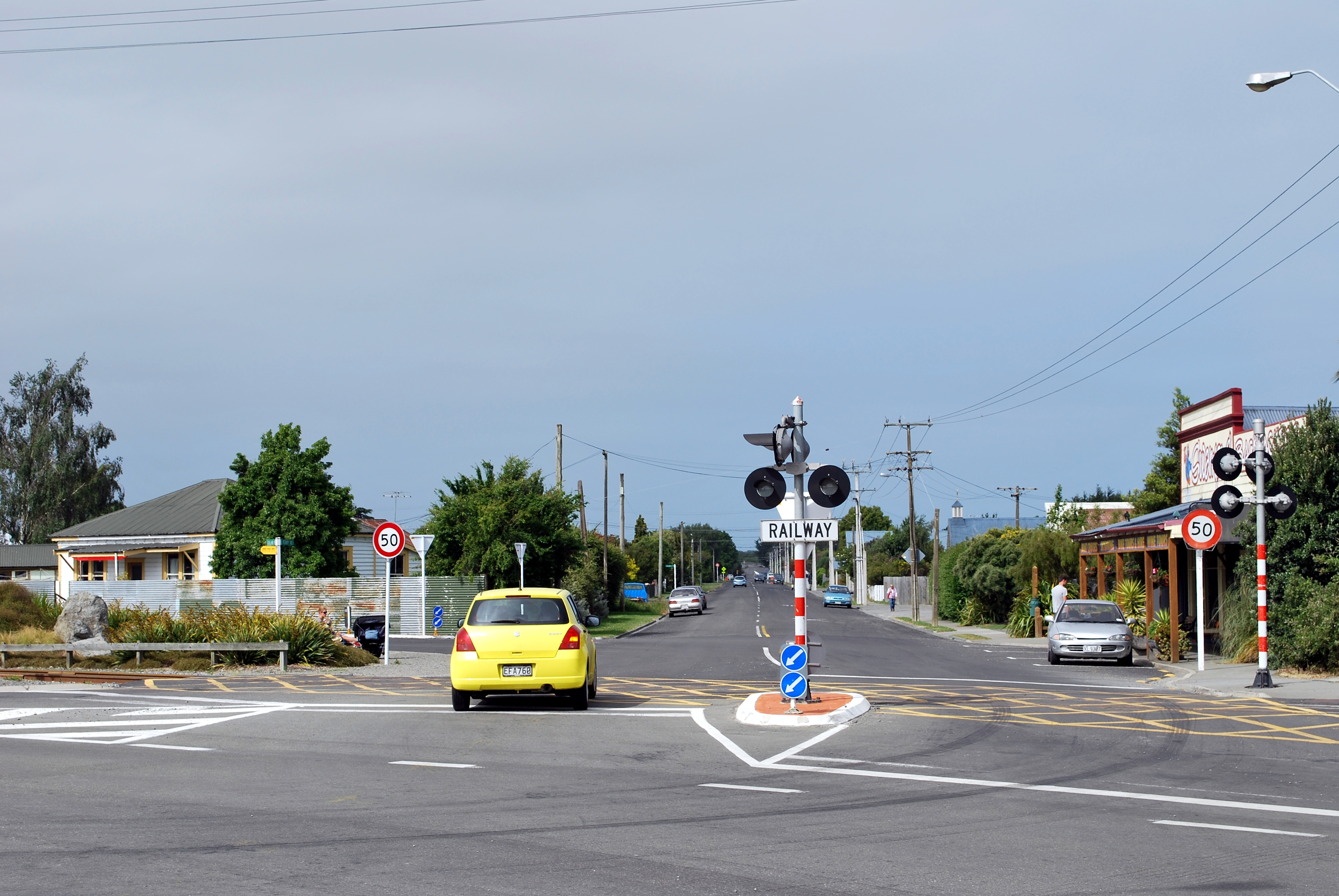
- Spring Creek State Highway 1 Crossing
- Interactive map of Spring Creek
- Coordinates: 41°27′38″S 173°57′46″E
- Country: New Zealand
- Region: Marlborough
- Ward: Wairau-Awatere General Ward; Marlborough Māori Ward
- Electorates: Kaikōura; Te Tai Tonga (Māori)

Government
  - Territorial Authority: Marlborough District Council
  - Marlborough District Mayor: Nadine Taylor
  - Kaikōura MP: Stuart Smith
  - Te Tai Tonga MP: Tākuta Ferris

Area
  - Total: 3.30 km^{2} (1.27 sq mi)

Population (June 2025)
  - Total: 540
  - Density: 160/km^{2} (420/sq mi)
- Postcode(s): 7202

Spring Creek is a small town in Marlborough, New Zealand. State Highway 1 runs past the settlement to the west, and the Wairau River flows past to the east. Picton is 22 km to the north, and Blenheim is 6 km to the south.

The first European settlers were George Dodson, William Soper, and Dr Vickerman, in 1850. There was a major flood in 1926, when the Wairau River burst its embankments.

Wairau Marae is located in Spring Creek. It is the marae (meeting ground) of Ngāti Rārua and Ngāti Toa Rangatira, and includes the Wairau wharenui (meeting house).

Spring Creek has a railway classification yard on the Main North Line.

== Demographics ==
Spring Creek is described by Stats NZ as a rural settlement. It covers 3.30 km^{2} (1.27 sq mi) and had an estimated population of 540 as of June 2025, with a population density of 164 people per km^{2}. It is part of the larger Spring Creek-Grovetown statistical area.

Historical population for Spring Creek
| Year | Pop. | ±% p.a. |
|---|---|---|
| 2006 | 573 | — |
| 2013 | 543 | −0.77% |
| 2018 | 579 | +1.29% |
| 2023 | 543 | −1.28% |

Spring Creek had a population of 543 in the 2023 New Zealand census, a decrease of 36 people (−6.2%) since the 2018 census, and unchanged since the 2013 census. There were 297 males and 246 females in 207 dwellings. 0.6% of people identified as LGBTIQ+. The median age was 46.3 years (compared with 38.1 years nationally). There were 99 people (18.2%) aged under 15 years, 84 (15.5%) aged 15 to 29, 252 (46.4%) aged 30 to 64, and 108 (19.9%) aged 65 or older.

People could identify as more than one ethnicity. The results were 89.5% European (Pākehā); 23.8% Māori; 2.8% Pasifika; 1.1% Asian; 0.6% Middle Eastern, Latin American and African New Zealanders (MELAA); and 2.8% other, which includes people giving their ethnicity as "New Zealander". English was spoken by 97.2%, Māori by 2.2%, and other languages by 5.5%. No language could be spoken by 1.1% (e.g. too young to talk). The percentage of people born overseas was 12.2, compared with 28.8% nationally.

Religious affiliations were 26.0% Christian, 1.7% Māori religious beliefs, and 0.6% New Age. People who answered that they had no religion were 64.6%, and 7.2% of people did not answer the census question.

Of those at least 15 years old, 51 (11.5%) people had a bachelor's or higher degree, 261 (58.8%) had a post-high school certificate or diploma, and 135 (30.4%) people exclusively held high school qualifications. The median income was $44,700, compared with $41,500 nationally. 27 people (6.1%) earned over $100,000 compared to 12.1% nationally. The employment status of those at least 15 was 237 (53.4%) full-time, 57 (12.8%) part-time, and 9 (2.0%) unemployed.

=== Spring Creek-Grovetown statistical area ===
Spring Creek-Grovetown statistical area also includes Grovetown. It covers 9.69 km^{2} (3.74 sq mi). It had an estimated population of 1,070 as of June 2025, with a population density of 110 people per km^{2}.

Historical population for Spring Creek-Grovetown
| Year | Pop. | ±% p.a. |
|---|---|---|
| 2006 | 990 | — |
| 2013 | 972 | −0.26% |
| 2018 | 1,071 | +1.96% |
| 2023 | 1,062 | −0.17% |

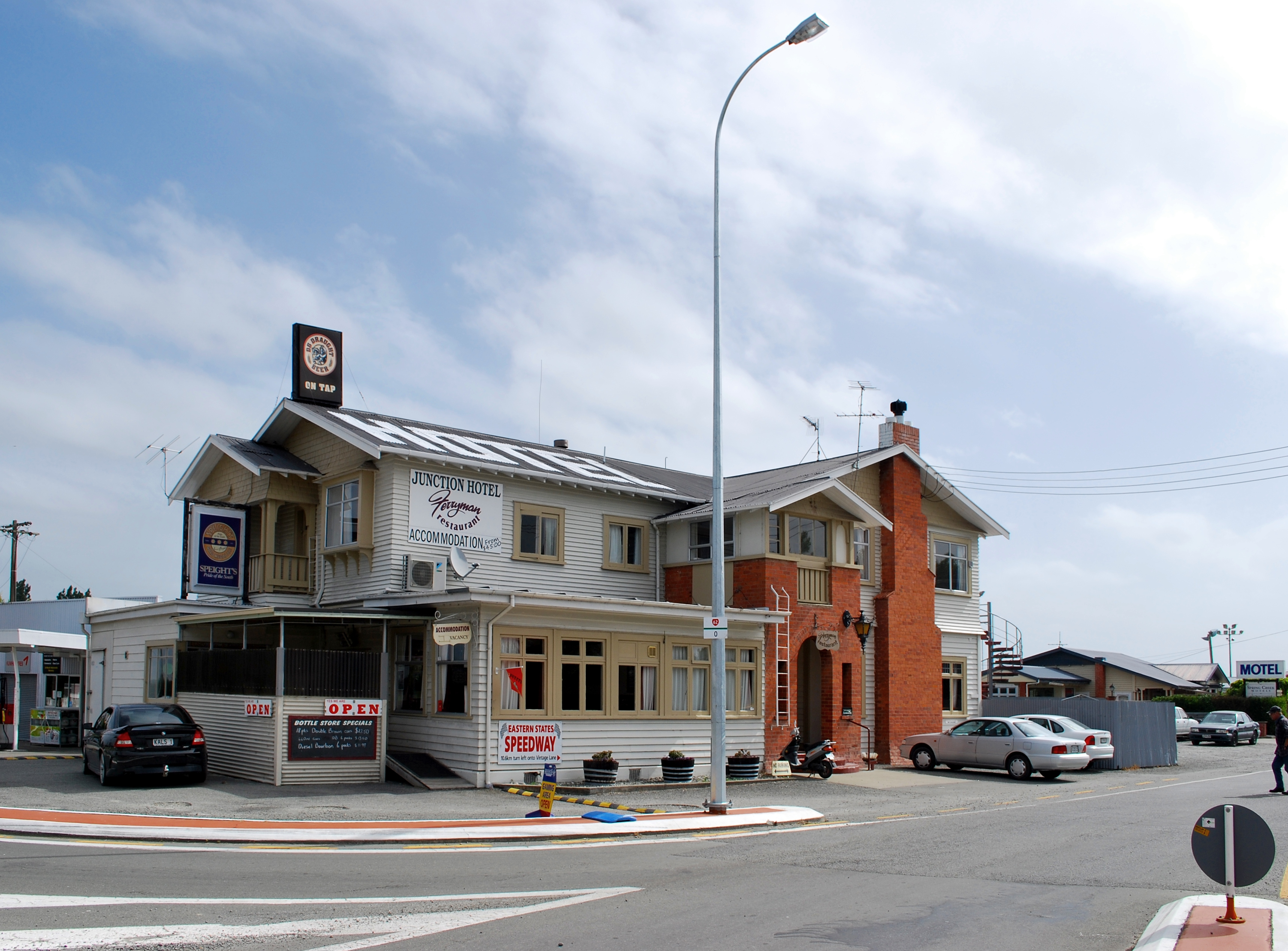
Junction Hotel in Spring Creek (now demolished)

Spring Creek-Grovetown had a population of 1,062 in the 2023 New Zealand census, a decrease of 9 people (−0.8%) since the 2018 census, and an increase of 90 people (9.3%) since the 2013 census. There were 558 males and 504 females in 405 dwellings. 1.1% of people identified as LGBTIQ+. The median age was 45.7 years (compared with 38.1 years nationally). There were 192 people (18.1%) aged under 15 years, 153 (14.4%) aged 15 to 29, 519 (48.9%) aged 30 to 64, and 195 (18.4%) aged 65 or older.

People could identify as more than one ethnicity. The results were 89.5% European (Pākehā); 18.9% Māori; 1.7% Pasifika; 3.4% Asian; 0.8% Middle Eastern, Latin American and African New Zealanders (MELAA); and 3.4% other, which includes people giving their ethnicity as "New Zealander". English was spoken by 98.0%, Māori by 1.7%, and other languages by 5.9%. No language could be spoken by 0.8% (e.g. too young to talk). New Zealand Sign Language was known by 0.3%. The percentage of people born overseas was 14.1, compared with 28.8% nationally.

Religious affiliations were 25.4% Christian, 0.6% Hindu, 0.8% Māori religious beliefs, 0.3% Buddhist, 0.6% New Age, and 0.8% other religions. People who answered that they had no religion were 62.4%, and 8.8% of people did not answer the census question.

Of those at least 15 years old, 132 (15.2%) people had a bachelor's or higher degree, 504 (57.9%) had a post-high school certificate or diploma, and 237 (27.2%) people exclusively held high school qualifications. The median income was $45,100, compared with $41,500 nationally. 78 people (9.0%) earned over $100,000 compared to 12.1% nationally. The employment status of those at least 15 was 480 (55.2%) full-time, 126 (14.5%) part-time, and 21 (2.4%) unemployed.

== Education ==
Spring Creek School is a coeducational contributing primary (years 1–6) school with a roll of 44 students (as of July 2026). A school was first founded in Spring Creek in 1861 or 1863. The present school was founded in 1873.

== See also ==
- Moutere Rugby Football Club
