= Wrightson =

Wrightson is a surname, and may refer to

- Bernard Wrightson, American olympic medalist
- Bernie Wrightson, American comic book artist
- Earl Wrightson, American singer and actor
- Harry Wrightson, English conservative politician
- Jeff Wrightson, English former footballer
- Jane Wrightson, New Zealand's chief censor
- John Wrightson, English agricultural pioneer
- Keith Wrightson, English historian
- Michele Wrightson, American artist
- Paddy Wrightson, English footballer
- Patricia Wrightson, Australian children's writer
- Roger Wrightson, English cricketer
- William Battie-Wrightson, English landowner, son of William Wrightson (MP for Aylesbury)
- William Wrightson (MP for Aylesbury), English landowner, grandson of William Wrightson (MP, born 1676)
- William Wrightson (MP, born 1676), English landowner, grandfather of William Wrightson (MP for Aylesbury)

It is also used as a first name, and may refer to

- Wrightson Mundy, High Sheriff of Derbyshire in 1737 and MP for Leicestershire in 1747

It also is the name of a baronetcy.

- Wrightson baronets
  - Sir Thomas Wrightson, 1st Baronet

It could also refer to

- Head Wrightsons
- Mount Wrightson
- Wrightson Road

== See also ==
- Wright (surname)
