= James Nelson Williams =

James Nelson Williams (22 August 1837 – 11 June 1915) was a New Zealand runholder, orchardist and entrepreneur. He was born in Waimate North, Northland, New Zealand in 1837.
