= Te-O-Tane =

Māori rangatira (chieftain)

Te-O-Tane was a Māori rangatira (chieftain) of the Ngāti Kahungunu iwi and Ngāi Tamaterangi hapū in the Wairoa area of Hawke Bay of New Zealand. He is remembered as a great warrior. In his youth, he was responsible for a decisive victory over Te Whānau-ā-Apanui at the Battle of Whāwhāpō. After this, he was attacked by various cousins and defeated them at the battles of Papohue and Te Ringa Whakapiki. He led an expedition up the Wairoa River to get revenge on Ngāti Ruapani and Ngāti Hinganga, which culminated in a total victory at the battle of Te Matenga-pūrangi. After this battle, his right-hand man, Taiwhakahuka, betrayed him, but Te-O-Tane survived, made peace with his remaining enemies and pursued Taiwhakahuka to Ōtaki. He died in old age.

== Life ==
The pā of Te-O-Tane
1 Papohue
2 Taurangakoau
3 Waitahora
4 Taramarama

Te-O-Tane was the son of Ta Maaha and his second wife Te Arawhiti. Through both parents, he was a descendant of Tama-te-rangi, the founding ancestor of his hapū and thence from Pawa and Kiwa who captained the Horouta waka and Tamatea Arikinui, who captained the Takitimu. He had one older half-brother, Te Kuku, and two younger full brothers, Te Rangiwawahia and Kohuwai, one younger full sister, Kamihi, and a younger half-brother, Paitehonga.

Te-O-Tane is reported to have been a giant man. According to one story, when he led an attack across a river to attack Pakiaka, the defenders abandoned the fortress when they saw that the water only came up to his hips, while it came up to the armpits of the other soldiers in the force. He had a patu (club) named Te Ate o Hinepehinga after his grandmother and a taiaha (spear) called Te Atero o Te Arawhiti after his mother, which was double the size of a normal one. These weapons were carried for him by his brother-in-law, Taiwhakahuka, who had married his sister Kamihi.

He controlled the following pā (fortified villages), most of which were located on the eastern side of the Wairoa River:

- Papohue, at the eastern side of the Wairoa River mouth
- Taurangakoau, near modern Frasertown
- Waitahora, a little further upriver from the previous
- Taramarama, near Ohuka.

These sites were designed so that they had one side which was intentionally left open to attack. Te-O-Tane generally ignored the property claims of others, hunting and gathering wherever he wished. This made him many enemies. In particular, he and his brothers were locked in a conflict with the children of their uncle Tapuwae, whose settlements were mainly on the western side of the Wairoa. Although they fought and defeated these cousins often, he never allowed any of them to be killed.

=== Battle of Whāwhāpō ===
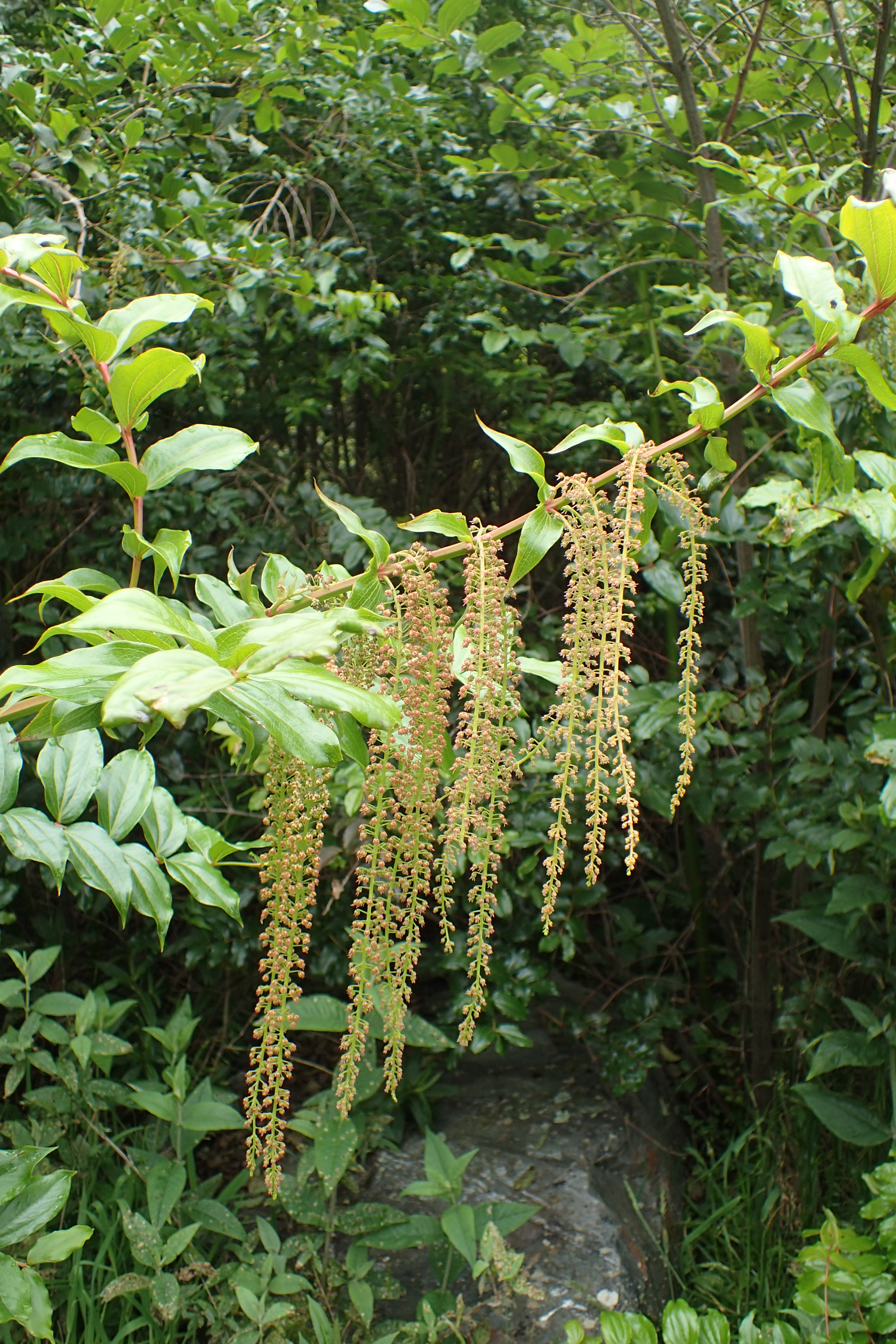
A tutu bush with shoots hanging down.

In his old age, Tapuwae wanted to avenge his grandfather Kotore and his brother-in-law Te Huki, who had been killed in raids by Te Whānau-ā-Apanui. He therefore sent his main commander, Takapuwai, with a force of 500 men to attack Te-O-Tane at Taramarama. His plan was to send whoever won against Te Whānau-ā-Apanui. Te-O-Tane led out a force of 200 men and met Takapuwai in open battle. He challenged Takapuwai to single combat and killed him. After the battle, Tapuwae invited Te-O-Tane to his pā at Hikukoekoea and asked him to avenge Kotore (who was also an ancestor of Te-O-Tane), by saying: taku kupu kia koe, ko a koutou whakanenene waiho i te kainga nei, ara, tikina te umu e tapuke mai ra hukea ("my word to you is that you let your family quarrels lie at home here. Go and uncover that oven which lives covered up yonder").

Before setting out on the expedition, Te-O-Tane and his brother Paiteihonga met at Papohue and watched the sea for a Te-O-Tane's personal sign of victory, a circle the colour of a rainbow reflected on the surface of the sea caused by a particular arrangement of the clouds. He called this Te Kahu-o-te-rangi ("the cloak of heaven") and claimed that it was his war belt. The pair passed by a tutu bush. Paiteihonga cut off seven shoots from it with a single strike of his taiaha, but Te-O-Tane bested him by cutting off eight.

Te-O-Tane brought a force of 300 men, while Tapuwae sent 900 men, under the command of Te Wainohu (a grandson of Te Huki). The whole force travelled to Motu (near modern Gisborne). There, the whole force had a feast of kurī (dog). Te Wainohu gave all the best food to his own men and all the worst food to Te-O-Tane's. Paitehonga was offended and encouraged Te-O-Tane to depart, but the latter refused.

The force continued to the territory of Te Whānau-ā-Apanui in the eastern Bay of Plenty. The first village that they encountered did not belong to the people responsible for the death of Kotore, so the war party decided not to attack it. While they were encamped outside the village, the local tohunga (priest) had a dream that one of the men in the war party would "make the mat of Apanui wet with blood." Te Wainohu thought this was himself, but the tohunga said that the man's name was Paitehonga, and, when he saw Te-O-Tane's brother, he declared him to be the man from his dream.

As the force marched towards the pā of Te Whānau-ā-Apanui, Te Wainohu's force rushed forward, while Te-O-Tane's held back. Te Wainohu attacked the pā and was quickly put to flight by the defenders. Te-O-Tane and his men pretended to join this retreat, but then suddenly turned around and attacked the pursuers, killing them all. They occupied the pā, killed everyone inside and three other pā as well. The bloodbath continued all through the night. Te-O-Tane's men grabbed everyone they encountered and killed everyone who did not say the password, tai ki tai. As a result, the battle is known as Whāwhāpō ("feeling around in the dark"). Paitehonga was killed in the battle and Te Wainohu developed a serious hatred of Te-O-Tane for having performed so much better in the battle than he had.

=== Battles at Papohue and Te Ringa Whakapiki ===
1 Papohue
2 Manukanui
3 Te Uhi

Te Wainohu had a brother, Te Kapuamātotoru. His children decided to attack Te-O-Tane at Papohue. The attackers were confidant that they would win, so when they reached the Wairoa river mouth, they began to dig pit-ovens for cooking Te-O-Tane and his people. Another chief, Tane-te-kohurangi Moewhare, was based at Manukanui (modern Wairoa) and was the brother of both Te Whewhera, the wife of Te Kapuamātotoru, and Patupuku, the wife of Te-O-Tane. Although Te-O-Tane had previously fought Moewhare at Te Whakahoki (where the Ohuia Lagoon meets the sea), and dunked him under the water, Moewhare decided to come to Te-O-Tane's aid. When Te-O-Tane saw that Moewhare was coming to help him, he rallied his men and defeated the attackers before Moewhare could join the fray. He invited Moewhare and his men to join in the victory feast.

The children of Te Whewhera fled to Hikawai, where they plotted to get revenge on Te-O-Tane and Moewhare. Te-O-Tane and his men now travelled upstream to Te Uhi, where they were treated to a feast at the pā of Hinekakahoa-o-te-rangi, granddaughter of Moewhare, and her husband Te Kāwiti, the founder of Ngāti Kurupakiaka. The children of Te Whewhera found out about this and set out to attack. Te Whewhera was furious that they had decided to do this; she went to Manukanui and warned Moewhare, saying "they will not respect my breasts now hanging, so they should fall. Do not spare them, but shut your eyes and kill them all." Moewhare went to Te Kawiti and Te-O-Tane at Te Uhi and told them to kill all the attackers.

The force that attacked Te Uhi was led by Te Wainohu, Tamaionarangi, and three sons of Te Kapuamatotoru - Te Ipu, Te Ruruku, and Raeroa. The leaders of the defenders, Te-O-Tane and Te Rimu, assembled their force on a small hill and pushed the attackers into the stream that flows into the Wairoa just west of Te Uhi. Eventually, Te-O-Tane was victorious. He made the attackers kneel in the water with their hands tied behind their backs. As a result, the stream was named Waikotuturi ("water of kneeling") and the battle was named Te Ringa Whakapiki ("the binding of hands").

Moewhare arrived at Te Uhi and discovered that Te-O-Tane had not killed the attackers. He said to Te-O-Tane, kati, kati, ka kore nei koutou e kaha ki te patu i o koutou rangatira, kati, waiho hei kai i o koutou manawa ("well, well, if you are not willing to kill your chiefs, let them live to eat your hearts") and had his slave, Mokehu whack the prisoners in the face with his penis. After the prisoners had apologised and abandoned the feud, they were allowed to return home.

=== Battle of Te Matenga-pūrangi ===
One of Te Kāwiti's men, Koroiho, was killed while foraging by the Ngāti Ruapani based at Whakapau-karakia pā in Tutuotekaha. Te Kāwiti told Te-O-Tane about this when he visited Te Uhi and Te-O-Tane offered to join him in leading a war party to get revenge. He led his forces to rendezvous with Te Kāwiti's men at Kauhouroa (near modern Scamperdown Bridge, east of Frasertown). They took one of Ngāti Ruapani's pā and killed almost everyone there. Te Kāwiti considered this sufficient revenge and returned home.

Te-O-Tane had previously been attacked at Waitahora by men of Ngāti Hinganga, who were based nearby. He decided to continue the war party and get revenge on them. He attacked Kakepo pā at Marumaru in the middle of the night. Because the inhabitants were asleep, he took it without a fight and killed nearly everyone inside. He continued to Te Maihi (near the modern Opouti bridge). They attacked this fortress from two sides simultaneously, Te-O-Tane attacking the front and his brother Te Rangiwawahia attacking the rear. When the inhabitants realised that they were trapped, they jumped into the Wairoa River and were drowned in their own pūrangi (eel traps). The battle is known as Te Matenga-pūrangi ("The slaughter in the eel traps") as a result.

=== Betrayal of Taiwhakahuka ===
After the battle of Te Matenga-pūrangi, Te-O-Tane's brother-in-law and spear-bearer, Taiwhakawhuka, took two young women prisoner. Te Rangiwawahia demanded one of the women for himself and Taiwhakawhaka refused, threatening him with his taiaha. Te-O-Tane forced him to hand one of the women over to Te Rangiwawahia. Offended by this, Taiwhakahuka agreed to help Te Wainohu kill Te-O-Tane.

When Te-O-Tane was at Waitahora and nearly all of his people were out hunting and foraging, Taiwhakahuka tied all of Te-O-Tane's weapons to the wall of his house and reported to Te Wainohu that he was defenceless. Te Wainohu led a war party to Waitahora on a night when Taiwhakahuka was on sentry-duty. He did not raise the alarm. Eight men with taiaha surrounded Te-O-Tane's house and he realised he had been betrayed. Therefore, Te-O-Tane wrapped a pākē (flax rain-cape) around his hand and stuck it out the window. They whacked it, thinking it was his head, and then he leapt out. One of the attackers drove his spear into Te-O-Tane's thigh, but he snapped it off and drove the attackers away. Then he fled across the river to his brother's village, Makeakea. The head of the attacker's spear was still lodged in his thigh; he removed it by pulling bending the top of a tree down, tying it to the spearhead, and then letting the tree spring back upright, yanking the spearhead out. The attackers thought that Te-O-Tane was mortally wounded, so they attacked Makeakea, but he beat them off twice. Te-O-Tane reminded Te Wainohu of his role at the Battle of Whāwhāpō. Then Te Wainohu sued for peace. Te-O-Tane agreed, renaming him Te Kahu-o-te-rangi after the good omen that he used to watch for from Papohue.

Taiwhakahuka fled south to the Aropaoanui River and from there to Ōtaki, where he took refuge in a pā on top of a steep hilltop. Te-O-Tane came after him with fifty men. When they attempted to assault the fortress, Taiwhakahuka rolled great boulders down at them. Therefore, Te-O-Tane decided to make the assault alone. As he climbed up, Taiwhakahuka again rolled boulders down at him, but Taiwhakahuka hid in natural depressions in the slope, allowing the boulders to bounce over the top of him. When he made it to the top, the gate was open, he charged in, and the people surrendered. They handed Taiwhakahuka over to Te-O-Tane, who killed him and ate his heart.

=== Death and burial ===
Te-O-Tane died in his old age. He was buried in a cave at Lake Ohuia.

== Family ==
Te-O-Tane married Patupuku, whose father was Te Rangituanui, son of Tapuwae, and whose mother was Ratuaiterangi, daughter of Te Hikawera. They had four children:

- Hikawera
- Tiakipa
- Tamahaere
- Te Koropi

== Commemoration ==
At the Takatimu wharenui at Waihirere marae, Te-O-Tane is depicted on the far right hand poupou.

== Bibliography ==
- Mitchell, J. H. (2014). Takitimu: A History of Ngati Kahungunu. Libro International. ISBN 978-1-877514-72-2.
