= Rākei-hikuroa =

Rangatira of Ngāti Kahungunu

Places in the life of Rākei-hikuroa
1 Pukepoto
2 Whiorau Pa on Maungapuremu
3 Māhia Peninsula
4 Tarawera

Rākei-hikuroa was a rangatira (chieftain) of Ngāti Kahungunu, who may have lived in the fifteenth century. His efforts to establish his son Tūpurupuru as upoko ariki (paramount chief) of Ngāti Kahungunu led to a conflict with his brother-in-law, Kahutapere, who expelled him from the Gisborne region, beginning a long-lasting conflict within Ngāti Kahungunu. After his expulsion, Rākei-hikuroa led his people south, beginning the Ngāti Kahungunu expansion into the Hawke’s Bay and Wairarapa regions.

== Life ==
Rākei-hikuroa was the son of Kahukura-nui, through whom he was a descendant of Tamatea Arikinui, the captain of the Tākitimu canoe and of the early explorer Toi, and of Ruatapuwahine, daughter of Ruapani, through whom he was a descendant of Pawa and Kiwa, captain and priest of the Horouta. He had one full-sister, Rongomai-tara, as well as two half-brothers, Rakaipaaka and Tamanuhiri, and a half-sister, Hinemanuwhiri. As an adult, Rākei-hikuroa was based at Pukepoto in Nihotētē, the area between Lake Repongaere and Waipaoa River, not far from Hexton. This site consisted of three hills, Kakarikitaurewa, Paekakariki and Te Upoko-o-Taraia, each with their own fortified village. An outpost village was based at modern Patutahi.

=== Murder of Tarakiuta and Tarakitai ===
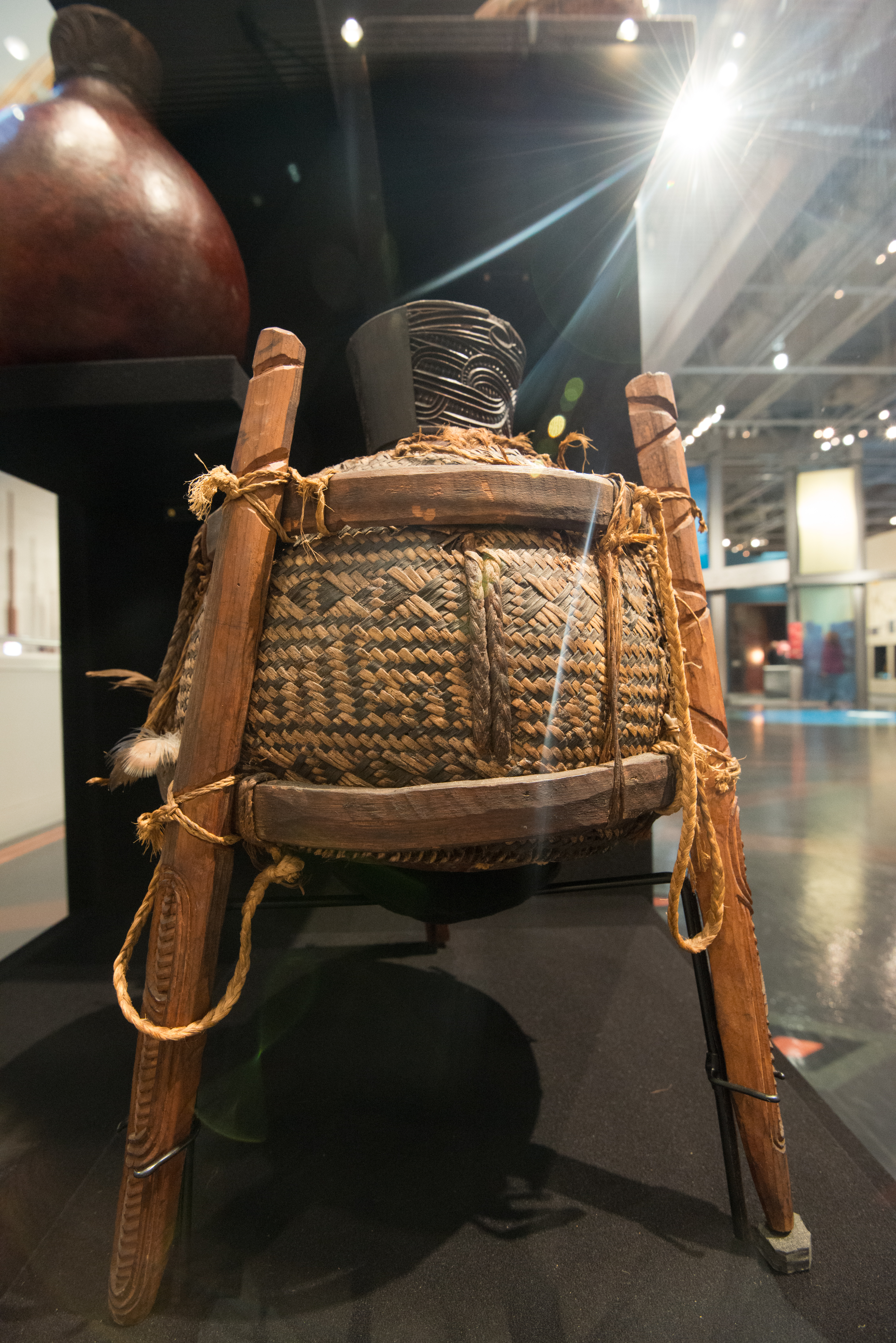
A taha huahua (calabash of preserved bird meat), Te Papa Tongarewa

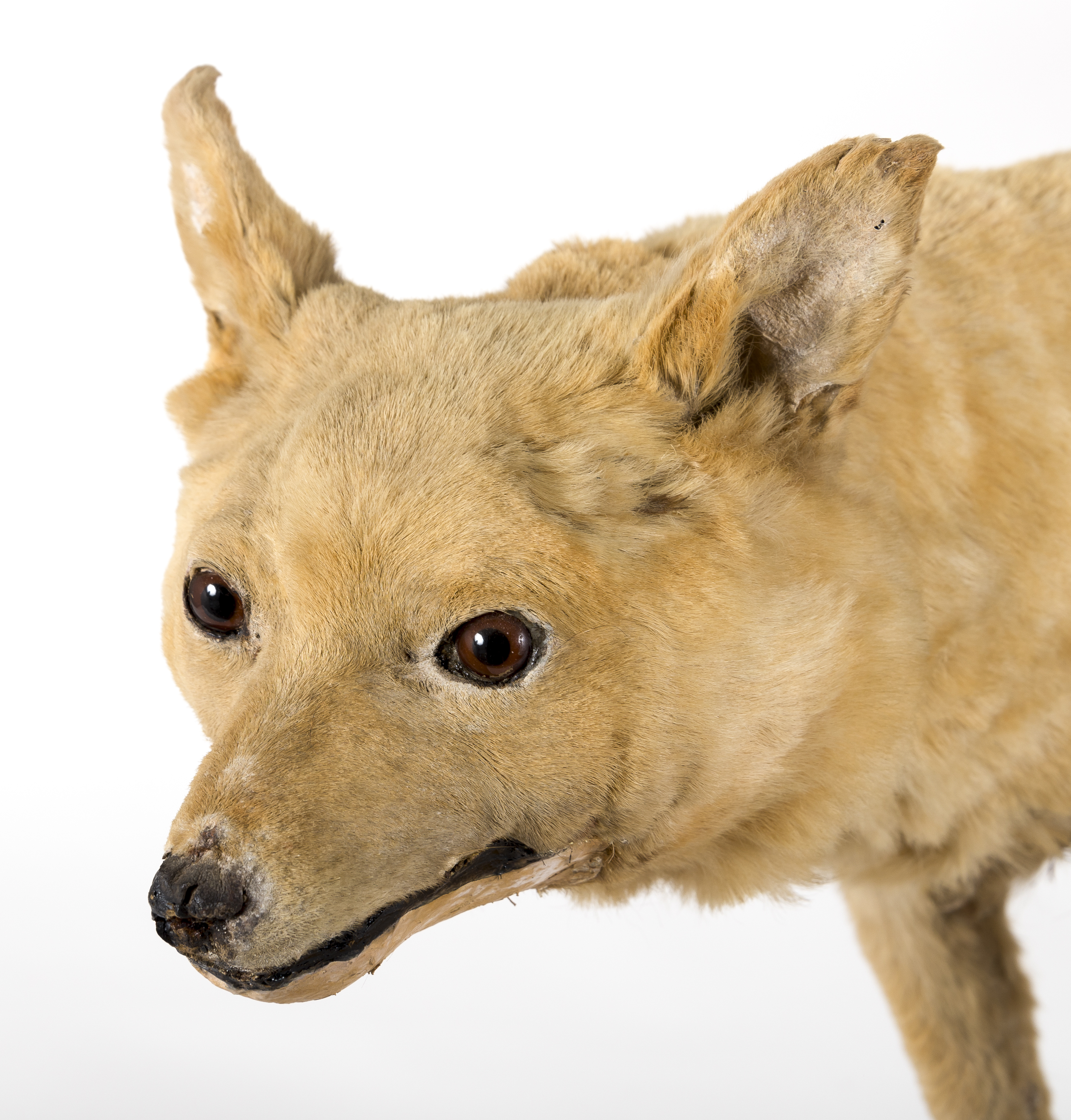
kurī (Māori dog), Otago Museum

Rākei-hikuroa had five sons, but greatly favoured Tūpurupuru. His excellence and physical prowess led him to say “Let Tūpurupuru be the star in the heavens” and he sought to make Tūpurupuru the upoko ariki (paramount chief) of Ngāti Kuhungunu. However, Kahutapere, who was Rākei-hikuroa’s cousin and the husband of Rākei-hikuroa's sister, Rongomai-tara, who was based at Whiorau Pā on Maungapuremu hill (near modern Ormond), wanted a share of the power for his twin sons, Tarakiuta and Tarakitai. Rākei-hikuroa saw this as a threat.

When a gift of huahua (preserved birds) was made to the twins and no similar gift was made to Tūpurupuru, Rākei-hikuroa considered it an insult. According to J. H. Mitchell, Tūpurupuru went to Whiorau to kill the twins. The twins were experts at ta-potaka (spinning tops), so Tūpurupuru challenged them to a contest with his own spinning top, Whero-rua, sending their tops into a kumara pit, and then killed them from behind with his taiaha spear. In another version, he killed them by collapsing a roof on the twins. Then, he went home and began making manuku tokotoko spears to use against Kahutapere's men when they came seeking revenge.

According to John Te Herekiekie Grace and Patrick Parsons, Rākei-hikuroa orchestrated the murder, sending his agent, a man named Tangihahi, to Whiorau to kill the twins. Tangihahi persuaded the twins to demonstrate their skills with their spinning tops on the clifftop at Whiorau and then pushed them over the edge. The bodies were taken back to Rākei-hikuroa’s village, cooked, and served up to Tūpurupuru, who was told that it was the meat from a kurī (Māori dog).

The twins’ mother, Rongomai-tara went to her brother Rākei-hikuroa and asked him what had happened to her children. At first he disavowed any knowledge, but later a tohunga divined their location by making two kites, representing the twins, which flew up and hovered over Pukepoto. In one version, Rākei-hikuroa sent his own kite up to bring them down, revealing his responsibility for the murder. In commemoration of this event, the two twins, Tarakiuta and Tarakitai, are depicted on a kite in Te Mana o Turanga wharenui of Whakato Marae at Manutuke.

=== Battle of Te Paepae o Rarotonga ===
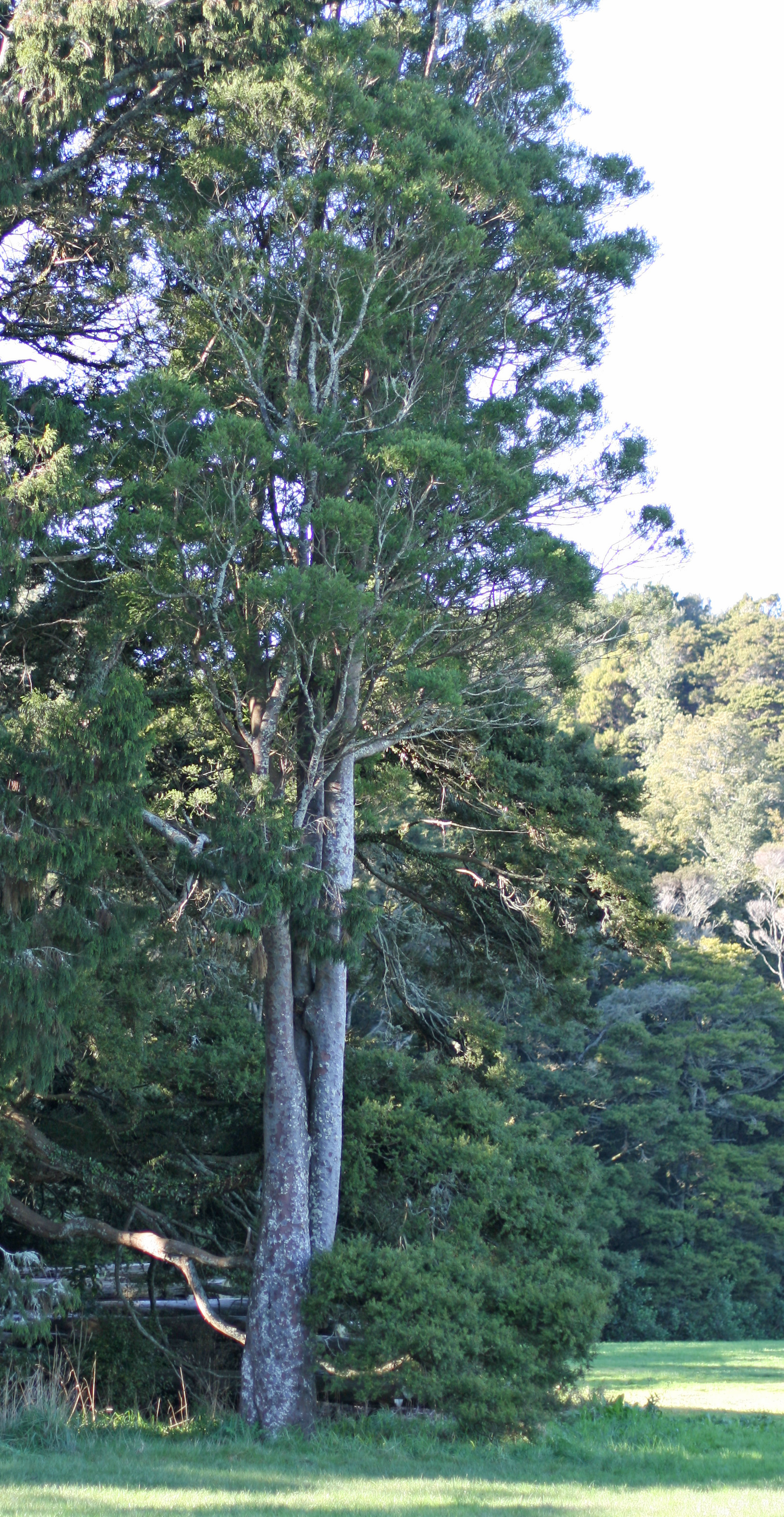
Matai tree

According to Grace, Rongomai-tara confronted her brother again and he cryptically admitted to the murder, saying waiho ra kia tu takitahi ana nga whetū o te rangi ("Let there be only one star shining in the sky). According to Te Waitohioterangi, Kahutapere confronted Rākei-hikuroa and was nearly killed. As he fled back to his village, his brother Rākei-hakeke was captured, along with his own twin sons, Matangiora and Kokakore. Although Kahutapere begged for them to be saved, they were executed.

Kahutapere raised a war party and attacked Pukepoto, in the Battle of Te Paepae o Rarotonga. According to Te Waitohioterangi, Kahutapere was aided by his cousin Te Māhaki-a-tauhei, his brother Taururangi, Māhaki's son Te Rangi-nui-a-Ihu, and Kahu-tauranga. They attacked Tūpurupuru's advance party, killing its commander Pouarau and eating his heart, as normal for the mātāika (first casualty of a battle). When Tūpurupuru received the news he was tying up his hair in preparation for the attack and the cord kept snapping, leading him to prophesy his own demise, “Pouarau in the morning and me in the afternoon.” Te Mahaki-a-tauhei’s son, Whakarau-potiki, had been away hunting when the call to arms came and had therefore been left behind, but he found the stake that had been used for cooking Pouarau’s heart (the kōhiku-manawa), tracked the war party to Pukepoto, made his way to the front line and killed Tūpurupuru with a spear strike to the throat. In recognition of this deed, Kahutapere allowed Whakarau to marry his daughters, Pare and Kura.

According to Grace, Tūpurupuru was cooked in an oven with matai wood. It is said that the sap which comes out of this wood when it is burnt is Tūpurupuru's blood. According to Mitchell, the body was hung in a kahikatea tree, swinging over a stream, and Rākei-hikuroa tried but was unable to pull it down. According to Te Waitohioterangi, his body was hung from a tree and the war party took turns throwing spears at it. Eventually, Mahaki and Rangi-nui-a-ihu stopped this desecration. Rākei-hikuroa gave Rangi-nui-a-ihu his pounamu patu (greenstone club), Ngawhakatangiura, and four cooking boulders in thanks for this.

=== Conflict with Kahuparoro ===
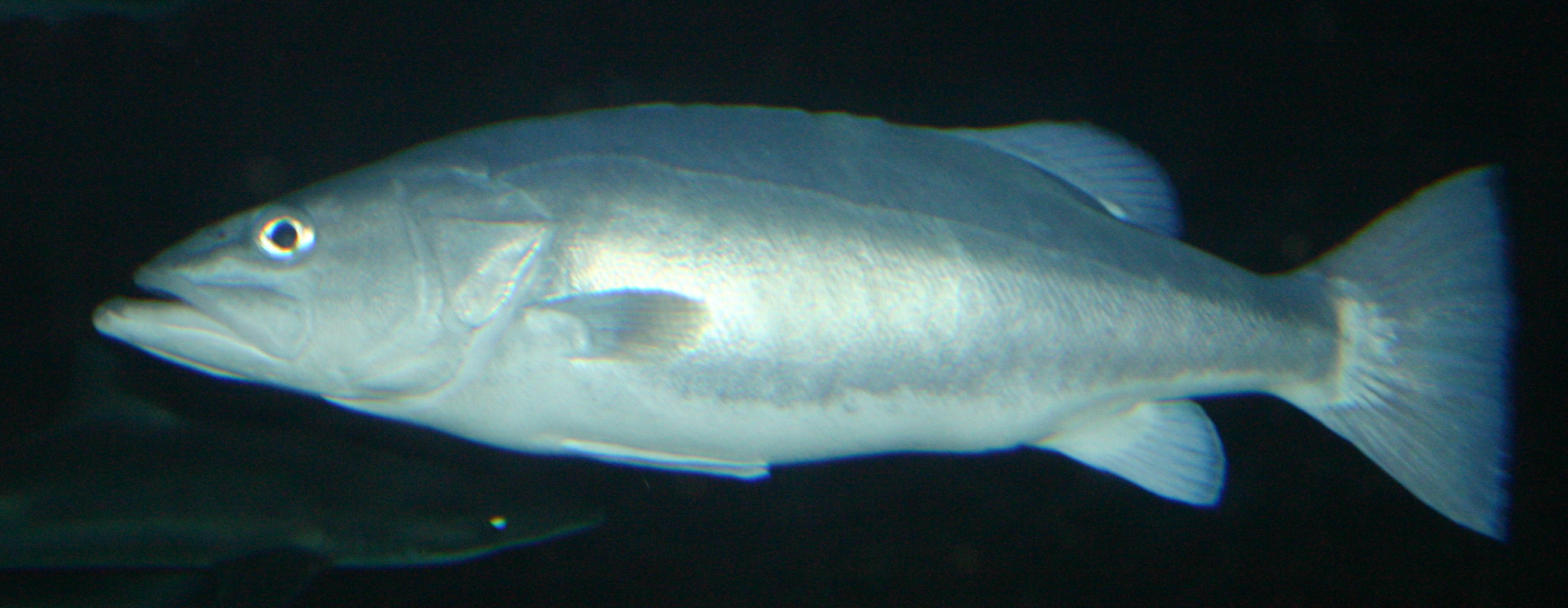
Hāpuku fish.

After the battle, Rākei-hikuroa decided that he had to leave the region and asked his brother Rakaipaaka to accompany him, but the latter refused and Rākei-hikuroa prophesied he pai ra kia kore koe e puhia e te hau ("It would be well in future had you done so, that you would not have been blown away in the storm"). Sometime later Rakaipaaka was defeated by Tu-te-kohi and forced to migrate south.

Rākei-hikuroa led around 150 of his people south to Okurarenga on the Māhia Peninsula, where they stayed with a local chieftain, Kahuparoro. When he heard about the Battle of Te Paepae o Rarotonga, Kahuparoro said that he wished to see the site of the conflict. Rākei-hikuroa gave him directions, asking only that he leave Tūpurupuru’s remains in peace. Instead, Kauparoro exhumed the remains and took them to Nukutaurua (also on the Māhia Peninsula), where he made fish hooks out of the shoulder bones.

When Kahuparoro was fishing at Matakana Rock with Rākei-hikuroa’s son Tamanuhiri, he got a hāpuku on his line and as it fought against him, he joked that it had no chance of getting away and let slip that his hook had been made from Tūpurupuru’s bones. Tamanuhiri overheard and faked an injury, by punching himself in the nose and pretending to pass out, so that they would take him quickly back to shore. There he told Rākei-hikuroa what he had heard. Rākei-hikuroa ambushed Kahuparoro and his men the next morning as they were dragging their canoe into the water for more fishing or as they were setting out together to dig for fern root, and killed nearly all of them. This was known as the Battle of Nukutaurua. The survivors fled to Ngāti Kurapoto kin at Tarawera in the Ahimanawa Range, with Tūpurupuru’s bones, some of which they made into spears for hunting birds and burying the rest in their new village, which they therefore named Tūpurupuru.

=== Later life and legacy ===
After the Battle of Nukutaurua, Rākei-hikuroa, his son Taraia, and Te Aomatarahi led his people onward to Hawke’s Bay, pursuing Rakai-weriweri, one of the men of Kahuparore, who had escaped. They first pursued him to Nuhaka, but he escaped again. Then they followed the coast, passing the mouths of the Wairoa and Mohaka Rivers until they came to the village of Pukuwheke at the mouth of the Aropaoanui River, where Rakai-weriweri had taken refuge. Taraia captured the village and killed Rakai-weriweri. This was called the Battle of Waikoukou. Then they took control of the region and launched raids into the Wairarapa.

Several generations after Rākei-hikuroa’s death, another chieftain, Kahutapere II, along with his sons Te Rangiapungangana, Te Anau, and Wharekotore, led a force to Tarawera to get revenge for the treatment of Tūpurupuru’s bones. He conquered the villages of Toropapa, Te Kupenga, Tahau, Urutomo, Matairangi, and Tūpurupuru and made the descendants of Kahuparoro flee towards Taupō. To commemorate the success, he named the captured region Ngapua a Rākei-hikuroa (the bloom of Rākei-hikuroa). Eventually he was succeeded as paramount chief by Te Hikawera, great-grandson of Rākei-hikuroa.

== Family and descendants ==
Rākei-hikuroa married Turoimata, Pāpāuma, Ruarauhanga, and Mahumokai, as well as Hine-te-raraku and Te Orāpa, daughters of his cousin Kahunoke, and had at least nineteen children. After Rākei-hikuroa's death, an enduring feud developed between the descendants of Pāpāuma (Te Hika a Pāpāuma) and the descendants of Ruarauhanga (Te Hika a Ruarauhanga).

The children of Turoimata were:

- Tuwhakawhiurangi
- Kiore

The children of Pāpāuma were:

- Hineraumoa
- Takapau
- Parea

- Wairakai

- Te Ariari, who married his cousin Te Raupare.

- Tahito
- Rurea
- Taiwha

- Takaha, who married Rakaipa and Kurapare and had two sons

- Hikawera

- Te Whatuiāpiti, ancestor of Ngāti Te Whatuiāpiti.
- Te Apunga

- Tauapare, who married Te Whatuiāpiti's son Te Hikawera (II).

- Te Matoe, father of Te Tatu, father of Kaitahi.

- Tamanuhiri, who married Uetakutahu, and had a daughter:

- Hinepare, who married her uncle Taraia.

- Ruatapu

The children of Ruarauhanga were:

- Hine-te-raraku

- Te Routangata, who married Marotauia:

- Hinemuturangi, who married her cousin Tama-te-rangi.

- Rangitawhiao, who married Ruapututu and Ruamateroa, daughters of Tawhao, and built the chief fortress of Te Hika a Ruarauhanga, Tahunamoa, at Waiohiki.

- Paheroariki
- Tuhinapo
- Tuterangiku

- Uewhereua
- Kahuwairua
- Taraia, ancestor of Ngāi Te Ūpokoiri
- Tūpurupuru, who married Hinemoa and had one son:

- Rangi-tūehu, who married Rakai-te-kura and had two daughters:

- Hineiao, ancestor of Ngāti Hineiao, who married her cousin Rangitaumaha.
- Tuaka, who married Te Angiangi and was mother of:

- Māhina-o-rangi, who married Tūrongo of Tainui and was an ancestor of Ngāti Raukawa and Ngāti Maniapoto.

- Kehu, who went to Taupo and never returned.
- Taraiwhenuakura, who died while hunting birds for Hineiao.

The children of Mahumokai were:

- Mahutapapa
- Tutehue

Children whose maternity is not specified:

- Tuhenga
- Tawhao

== Bibliography ==
- Grace, John Te Herekiekie (1959). Tuwharetoa: The history of the Maori people of the Taupo District. Auckland [N.Z.]: A.H. & A.W. Reed.
- Jones, Pei Te Hurinui; Biggs, Bruce (2004). Ngā iwi o Tainui : nga koorero tuku iho a nga tuupuna = The traditional history of the Tainui people. Auckland [N.Z.]: Auckland University Press. ISBN 1869403312.
- Mitchell, J. H. (2014). Takitimu: A History of Ngati Kahungunu. Libro International. ISBN 978-1-877514-72-2.
- Parsons, Patrick (1997). WAI 400: The Ahuriri Block: Maori Cusomary Interests (PDF).
- Te Waitohioterangi, Tanith Wirihana (2020). "Tupurupuru and the Murder of the top [spinning] twins". Nga Korero. (an account of the conflict between Rākei-hikuroa and Kahutapere transmitted from Hiraina Riria Pere, Hetekia Te Kani Pere II, and Hiraina Hinetoko).
