= Te Ruruku o te Rangi =

Māori rangatira (chieftain)

Te Ruruku o te Rangi (fl. 1750-1800) was a Māori rangatira (chieftain) of the Ngāti Kahungunu iwi. Born in the Wairoa River on the middle reaches of the Wairoa River in northern Hawke Bay, New Zealand, he was recruited as a war leader by Ngāti Tū, who gave him land in Ahuriri, where he became ancestor of the Ngāi Te Ruruku hapū.

== Life ==
Te Ruruku was the second child and eldest son of Te Kapuamātotoru and Te Whewhera. Through his father he was a direct male line descendant of Rakaipaaka, and through both parents he was descended from Kahungunu and Tamatea Arikinui, who captained the Takitimu waka from Hawaiki to New Zealand. He had four sisters - Hinemaka, Hineori, Hinetunge, and Hine-i-nohi - and four brothers - Te Ipu, Raeroa, Hinerara, and Kokotangiao. Te Ruruku grew up in his parents' pā at Whereinga and Hikawai, near modern Frasertown.

=== Battles at Papohue and Te Ringa Whakapiki ===
1 Papohue
2 Manukanui
3 Te Uhi

Te Kapuamātotoru's children decided to attack their uncle Te-O-Tane at Papohue. The attackers were confidant that they would win, so when they reached the Wairoa river mouth, they began to dig pit-ovens for cooking Te-O-Tane and his people. But Te-O-Tane rallied his men and defeated the attackers before Moewhare could join the fray. He invited Moewhare and his men to join in the victory feast.

The attackers fled to Hikawai, where they plotted to get revenge on Te-O-Tane and their uncle Moewhare, who had aided him. Te-O-Tane and his men now travelled upstream to Te Uhi, where they were treated to a feast at the pā of Hinekakahoa-o-te-rangi, granddaughter of Moewhare, and her husband Te Kāwiti, the founder of Ngāti Kurupakiaka. Te Kapuamātotoru's children found out about this and set out to attack. Their mother, Te Whewhera, was furious that they had decided to do this, because Te-O-Tane was her brother-in-law; she went to Manukanui and warned Moewhare, saying "they will not respect my breasts now hanging, so they should fall. Do not spare them, but shut your eyes and kill them all." Moewhare went to Te Kawiti and Te-O-Tane at Te Uhi and told them to kill all the attackers.

The force that attacked Te Uhi was led by Te Wainohu, Tamaionarangi, Te Ruruku, Te Ipu, and Raeroa. The leaders of the defenders, Te-O-Tane and Te Rimu, assembled their force on a small hill and pushed the attackers into the stream that flows into the Wairoa just west of Te Uhi. Eventually, Te-O-Tane was victorious. He made the attackers kneel in the water with their hands tied behind their backs. As a result, the stream was named Waikotuturi ("water of kneeling") and the battle was named Te Ringa Whakapiki ("the binding of hands").

Moewhare arrived at Te Uhi and discovered that Te-O-Tane had not killed Te Ruruku and the other attackers. He said to Te-O-Tane, kati, kati, ka kore nei koutou e kaha ki te patu i o koutou rangatira, kati, waiho hei kai i o koutou manawa ("well, well, if you are not willing to kill your chiefs, let them live to eat your hearts") and had his slave, Mokehu whack the prisoners in the face with his penis. After the prisoners had apologised and abandoned the feud, they were allowed to return home.

=== Journey to Heretaunga ===
In Heretaunga Ngāti Hineterangi made use of fishing grounds belonging to Ngāti Tū and Ngāti Moe. The chief of Ngāti Tū, Marangatūhetaua, asked Tuku, son of Hikawera to lead a campaign against them, but because he was related to Ngāti Hineterangi, he did not prosecute the war with vigour.

Therefore, Marangatūhetaua recruited Te Ruruku, who was then in Mohaka, visiting his uncle Te Kahu-o-te-rangi. He led a war party which defeated Ngāti Hineterangi. Marangatūhetaua rewarded him with land in the western Hawke's Bay, between Arapawanui and Te Whanganui-a-Orotū.

== Family ==
Te Ruruku married Ngarangikatangiiho and had children, including:

- Hineioroia (daughter), who married Te Ua Te Awha of Ngāti Parau, a descendant of Hikawera II.

- Hineiaia (daughter).
- Te Hauwaho (son).
- Oneone (son).

- Te Herepao (daughter), who married Haemania, chief of Ngāti Hinepare, another descendant of Hikawera II:

- Tanemoana (daughter).
- Paeroa (daughter), who was killed by Ngati Raukawa invaders at Tangoio during the Musket Wars.

- Te Karawa (son).
- Te Moananui (son).

- Heitawhiri (daughter).
- Te Aitu o Te Ragni, killed by Ngati Raukawa invaders at Te Iho o Te Rei during the Musket Wars.

- Te Kariwhenua (son), rangatira of Ngāi Te Ruruku, who was based at Te Kapemaihi pā in 1848 and moved to Petane pā in 1849. William Colenso met him several times. Ancestor of the Puna family.
- Te Wharerakau (son), who married Kutia, who was killed with her niece at Tangoio during the Musket Wars:

- Meke (son), rangatira of Ngati Tu at the time of the attack on Tangoio. His main base was Te Iho o Torohanga.

- Wahapango (son)
- Matewai (daughter)

== Bibliography ==
- Mitchell, J. H. (2014). Takitimu: A History of Ngati Kahungunu. Libro International. ISBN 978-1-877514-72-2.
- Parsons, Patrick (1994). WAI 201 J18: The Mohaka-Waikare Confiscated Lands - Ancestral Overview (PDF).
- Parsons, Patrick (1997). WAI 400: The Ahuriri Block: Maori Cusomary Interests (PDF).
