= Te Huki =

Te Huki was a Māori rangatira (chieftain) of the Ngāti Kahungunu iwi and Ngāti Rakaipaaka hapū from around the Mohaka in northern Hawke Bay, New Zealand. Through a set of marriages, he created a network of connections along the east coast of the North Island, known as Te Kupenga a Te Huki ("the net of Te Huki"). He probably lived in the early eighteenth century.

== Life ==
Te Huki was the son of Tureia and Hinekimihanga. Through his father, he was a direct male-line descendant of Rakaipaaka, and through both parents of Kahungunu and Tamatea Arikinui, who captained the Takitimu waka from Hawaiki to New Zealand. He had two younger sisters, Te Rauhina, who married her cousin Tapuwae, and Te Rangimokai, who married Te Hikawera.

Te Huki was originally based in the area along the coast of Hawke Bay between Waihua and Mohaka, which is known after him as Ngā Ngaru a Te Huki ("the waves of Te Huki"). Through a succession of marriages, Te Huki established a network of connections that extended along the east coast of the North Island from Tūranganui-a-Kiwa to Wairarapa, which was known as Te Kupenga a Te Huki ("the net of Te Huki"). The southern "post" of the net was his grandson Ngarangi-whakaupoko, whom he installed at Te Poroporo, near Pōrangahau; the eastern "post" was his grandson Ngā-whaka-tātare, at Whāngārā; and the centre "float" was his son Puruaute. J.H. Mitchell reports that Te Huki's three wives all remained in their areas of origin, while he travelled between them. This made him popular with his in-laws' peoples and ensured that they supported his children as leaders. Other reports say that his first wife, Te Rangitohumare, settled with him at Wairoa.

Te Huki was attacked, killed, and eaten by Te Whānau-ā-Apanui, while crossing the Te Arai River on his way to visit his third wife at Tītīrangi in Tūranganui-a-Kiwa. This murder was avenged by his cousin Te-O-Tane and his grandson Te Kahu-o-te-Rangi at the Battle of Whāwhāpō.

== Family ==
Te Huki's first marriage was to Te Rangitohumare, daughter of Te Hikawera and had three sons and a daughter:

- Puruaute (son), the centre "post" of Te Huki's net, who was settled in the Wairoa region and married Te Matakainga-i-te-tihi, the senior child of Tapuwae. They had three sons:

- Te Kapuamatotoru, father of Te Ruruku, ancestor of Ngāi te Ruruku
- Mātaitai, ancestor of Īhaka Whaanga.
- Te Kahu-o-te-Rangi, ancestor of Ngāti Pahauwera

- Mātaitai (son).
- Hineraru (daughter), who married Hōpara of Pōrangahau:

- Ngārangi-whaka-ūpoko, the southern "post" of Te Huki's net.

- Te Hauwaitanoa (son)

Te Huki's second wife was Te Rōpūhina, a chieftainess of Nūhaka:

- Te Rākatō (son), who settled on the Māhia Peninsula and was ancestor of Ngāi Te Rākatō
- Tūreia (son), who settled at Nūhaka
- Te Rehu (son), who settled at Nūhaka and was ancestor of Ngāi Te Rehu

Te Huki's third wife was Rewanga, daughter of Te Aringa-i-waho, chief of Tītīrangi:

- Te Kainui
- Te Umupapa (daughter), who married Marukawiti, son of Kanohi:

- Ngā-whaka-tātare-o-te-rangi, the eastern "post" of Te Huki's net and ancestor of Te Kani-a-Takirau.

According to J. H. Mitchell, only descendants of Te Huki and his brother-in-law Tapuwae are traditionally considered to be aristocrats among the Ngāti Kahungunu of the Wairoa area.

== Bibliography ==
- Mitchell, J. H. (2014). Takitimu: A History of Ngati Kahungunu. Libro International. ISBN 978-1-877514-72-2.
- Parsons, Patrick (1997). WAI 400: The Ahuriri Block: Maori Cusomary Interests (PDF).
- Taonui, Rāwiri. "Whakapapa – genealogy - What is whakapapa?". Te Ara - the Encyclopedia of New Zealand.
- Walker, Wananga Te Ariki (27 January 2014). "Te Kupenga-a-Te Huki – Te Huki's Net". Nga Maunga Korero.
