= Waikōau River =

Waikōau River may refer to two rivers in New Zealand:

- Waikōau River (Fiordland), a river flowing into Foveaux Strait
- Waikōau River (Hawke's Bay), a river flowing into the Aropaoanui River of Hawke's Bay
