= Te Kahu-o-te-rangi =

Māori rangatira (chieftain)

Te Kahu-o-te-rangi, originally Te Wainohu (died 1824) was a Māori rangatira (chieftain) of the Ngāti Kahungunu iwi and founder of Ngāti Pāhauwera in the Mohaka area of Hawke Bay of New Zealand. He was the leader of an expedition that successfully took revenge on Te Whānau-ā-Apanui for earlier attacks, but in this fight he was outshone by his cousin Te-O-Tane, which led to a long conflict between the two chiefs. Eventually, Te Kahu-o-te-rangi received the name Te Kahu-o-te-rangi from Te-O-Tane as a peace offering. Te Kahu-o-te-rangi also laid down boundaries for his territory, but there are differing accounts on the exact course of these borders. His descendants are named Ngāti Pāhauwera ("people of the singed beard"), because his beard was burnt when his head was being preserved after his death.

== Life ==
Te Kahu-o-te-rangi was born with the name Te Wainohu at Pohonui-o-hine pā on the western bank of the Wairoa river. His father was Puruaute of Ngāti Rakaipaaka and his mother was Te Matakainga-i-te-tihi, the queen (hei tihi) of the Ngāi Tamaterangi hapū of the Wairoa river valley. His grandfathers were Te Huki and Tapuwae. Only descendants of these two men were traditionally considered to be aristocrats among the Ngāti Kahungunu of the northern Hawke Bay area. As a descendant of both Te Kapuamātotoru was particularly well-born. Through his father, he was a direct male-line descendant of Rakaipaaka, and through both parents he was descended from Kahungunu and Tamatea Arikinui, who captained the Takitimu waka from Hawaiki to New Zealand. He had one older brother, Te Kapuamātotoru, and one younger brother, Mātaitai.

=== Battle of Whāwhāpō ===
Over several generations, Te Whānau-ā-Apanui launched raids into the Wairoa area, killing Te Wainohu's ancestor, Kotore and then his grandfather, Te Huki. In order to get revenge, Te Wainohu's other grandfather, Tapuwae, organised a mighty war party of 900 men and placed Te Wainohu in command. To this force was added another 300 men, led by Te Wainohu's cousin, Te-O-Tane. The whole force travelled to Motu (near modern Gisborne). There, the whole force had a feast of kurī (dog). Te Wainohu gave all the best food to his own men and all the worst food to Te-O-Tane's. Paitehonga was offended and encouraged Te-O-Tane to depart, but the latter refused.

The force continued to the territory of Te Whānau-ā-Apanui in the eastern Bay of Plenty. The first village that they encountered did not belong to the people responsible for the death of Kotore, so the war party decided not to attack it. While they were encamped outside the village, the local tohunga (priest) had a dream that one of the men in the war party would "make the mat of Apanui wet with blood." Te Wainohu thought this was himself, but the tohunga said that the man's name was Paitehonga, and, when he saw Te-O-Tane's brother, he declared him to be the man from his dream.

As the force marched towards the pā of Te Whānau-ā-Apanui, Te Wainohu's force rushed forward, while Te-O-Tane's held back. Te Wainohu attacked the pā and was quickly put to flight by the defenders. Te-O-Tane and his men pretended to join this retreat, but then suddenly turned around and attacked the pursuers, killing them all. They occupied the pā, killed everyone inside and three other pā as well. The bloodbath continued all through the night. Te-O-Tane's men grabbed everyone they encountered and killed everyone who did not say the password, tai ki tai. As a result, the battle is known as Whāwhāpō ("feeling around in the dark"). Paitehonga was killed in the battle and Te Wainohu developed a serious hatred of Te-O-Tane for having performed so much better in the battle than he had.

=== Battles at Papohue and Te Ringa Whakapiki ===
1 Papohue
2 Manukanui
3 Te Uhi

Te Wainohu's nephews decided to attack Te-O-Tane at Papohue, but were defeated When they learnt that Te-O-Tane and his men were having a feast at the pā of Hinekakahoa-o-te-rangi and Te Kāwiti, the founder of Ngāti Kurupakiaka, they decided to attack. Their mother, Te Whewhera was furious that they had decided to do this, since Te-O-Tane was her brother-in-law; she went to Manukanui and warned her brother Moewhare, saying "they will not respect my breasts now hanging, so they should fall. Do not spare them, but shut your eyes and kill them all." Moewhare went to Te Kawiti and Te-O-Tane at Te Uhi and told them to kill all the attackers.

The force that attacked Te Uhi was led by Te Wainohu, along with three of his nephews - Te Ipu, Te Ruruku, and Raeroa - and Tamaionarangi. The leaders of the defenders, Te-O-Tane and Te Rimu, assembled their force on a small hill and pushed the attackers into the stream that flows into the Wairoa just west of Te Uhi. Eventually, Te-O-Tane was victorious. He made the attackers kneel in the water with their hands tied behind their backs. As a result, the stream was named Waikotuturi ("water of kneeling") and the battle was named Te Ringa Whakapiki ("the binding of hands").

Moewhare arrived at Te Uhi and discovered that Te-O-Tane had not killed the attackers. He said to Te-O-Tane, kati, kati, ka kore nei koutou e kaha ki te patu i o koutou rangatira, kati, waiho hei kai i o koutou manawa ("well, well, if you are not willing to kill your chiefs, let them live to eat your hearts") and had his slave, Mokehu whack the prisoners in the face with his penis. After the prisoners had apologised and abandoned the feud, they were allowed to return home.

=== Final conflict with Te-O-Tane ===
After the battle of Te Matenga-pūrangi, Te-O-Tane's brother-in-law and spear-bearer, Taiwhakawhuka, took two young women prisoner. Te Rangiwawahia demanded one of the women for himself and Taiwhakawhaka refused, threatening him with his taiaha. Te-O-Tane forced him to hand one of the women over to Te Rangiwawahia. Offended by this, Taiwhakahuka agreed to help Te Wainohu kill Te-O-Tane.

When Te-O-Tane was at Waitahora and nearly all of his people were out hunting and foraging, Taiwhakahuka tied all of Te-O-Tane's weapons to the wall of his house and reported to Te Wainohu that he was defenceless. Te Wainohu led a war party to Waitahora on a night when Taiwhakahuka was on sentry-duty. He did not raise the alarm. Eight men with taiaha surrounded Te-O-Tane's house, but he escaped and fled across the river to his brother's village, Makeakea. The attackers thought that Te-O-Tane was mortally wounded, so they attacked Makeakea, but he beat them off twice. Te-O-Tane reminded Te Wainohu of his role at the Battle of Whāwhāpō and Te Wainohu sued for peace. Te-O-Tane agreed, giving Te Wainohu a new name, Te Kahu-o-te-rangi ("the cloak of heaven"). This referred to a circle the colour of a rainbow reflected on the surface of the sea, that Te-O-Tane used to watch for from Papohue and that he considered his personal omen of victory.

=== Ngāti Pāhauwera ===
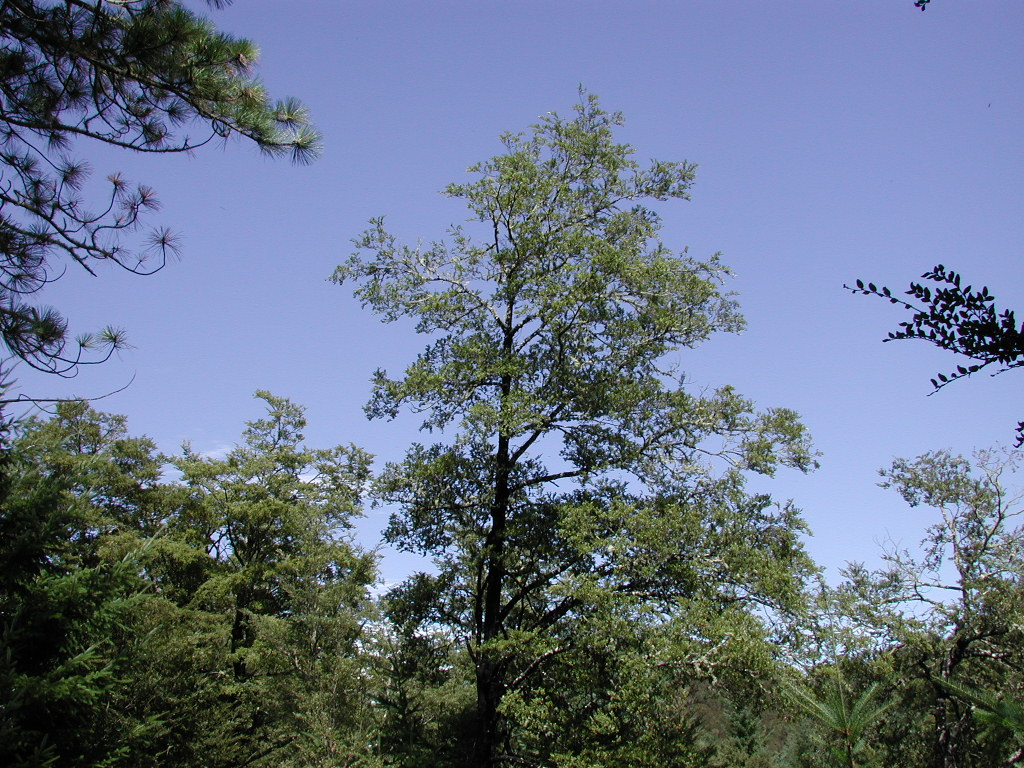
tawai tree.

The boundaries of the territory under Te Kahu-o-te-Rangi's control became important in disputes about land ownership before the Maori Land Court in the late nineteenth and early twentieth centuries.

According to a Ngāti Pāhauwera account given by Wepiha Te Wainohu in 1879, Te Kahu-o-te-rangi decided to lay down his boundary, starting on the coast at Pukekaraka, heading up to Puketito, on to the Waiau River. There he encountered Te Kapua, a rangatira from Urewera, who said "this is as far as you go." Te Kahu-o-te-rangi accepted this and continued on to Te Haroto, on to Puketitiri and then down the Waihinganga River to the ocean. As he walked from the Waiau River, Te Kahu-o-te-rangi marked all the tawai trees all the way along the boundary with his axe. But in a court hearing about Mohaka in 1896, Arapata Hapuku said that the boundary Te Kahu-o-te-rangi laid down was different: Mangapukatea to Ohinepaka (Te Pou a Waho) to Huiarau to Tataraakina to Titiokura to Te Waiohinganga, where he established Maraitai as a boundary post at Ngetengeterau or on the island of Urewiri. Other accounts place the southern border at the Waikare River (now called Waikari River). Researchers for the Waitangi Tribunal concluded that Te Kahu-o-te-rangi had not claimed control of territory, but only mana over the people within this area and that the attacks by Te Heuheu Mananui after his death caused his descendants to lose much of this mana. This conclusion was disputed by some submissions to the tribunal.

In 1819 Te Kahu-o-te-rangi killed Te Ohomaori of Ngati Raukawa. This was one of the contributing factors to an 1820 invasion of Heretaunga by Tuwharetoa, Ngati Raukawa, and Waikato during the Musket Wars, which culminated in a decisive victory at Iho o Te Rei.

When Te Kahu-o-te-rangi died in 1824, his beard caught alight while his head was being preserved using a fire. As a result, his descendants are known as Ngāti Pāhauwera, "the people of the singed beard". He was buried at Te Heru o Tureia.

== Bibliography ==
- Mitchell, J. H. (2014). Takitimu: A History of Ngati Kahungunu. Libro International. ISBN 978-1-877514-72-2.
- Waitangi Tribunal (1992). WAI 119: The Mohaka River report, 1992 (PDF). Brooker and Friend. ISBN 0864721102.
- Waitangi Tribunal (1995). WAI 55: Te Whanganui-A-Orotu claim (PDF). GP Publications. ISBN 978-1-86956-193-2.
- Parsons, Patrick (1997). WAI 400: The Ahuriri Block: Maori Cusomary Interests (PDF).
- Waitangi Tribunal (2004). The Mohaka Ki Ahuriri Report: The claims and the inquiry. Legislation Direct. ISBN 978-1-86956-273-1.
