= Taraia =

Ngāti Kahungunu chieftain

Taraia was a rangatira (chieftain) of Ngāti Kahungunu and ancestor of the Ngāi Te Ūpokoiri hapū. He may have lived in the early eighteenth century. After his family were driven out of the East Cape region, he and his brothers led them south into Hawke's Bay, where he brought the Heretaunga Plains under Ngāti Kahungunu control, through the conquest of Pukuwheke, Heipipi, and Ōtātara. From here Ngāti Kahungunu eventually spread south all the way to Wellington.

== Life ==
Taraia was the son of Rākei-hikuroa, through whom he was a descendant of Tamatea Arikinui, the captain of the Tākitimu canoe and of the early explorer Toi, His mother was Ruarauhanga. He had five full brothers, one full sister, and fourteen half siblings. He grew up at Pukepoto in Nihotētē, the area between Lake Repongaere and Waipaoa River, not far from Hexton.

Rākei-hikuroa or his son Tūpurupuru killed the twin sons of Kahutapere and were defeated by Kahutapere and Te Mahaki-a-tauhei at the Battle of Te Paepae o Rarotonga. After this, the family migrated south to Okurarenga on the Māhia Peninsula, where they stayed with a local chieftain, Kahuparoro. However, they discovered that he had made Tūpurupuru's bones into fish hooks, so they ambushed him and his men and killed nearly all of them. This was known as the Battle of Nukutaurua.

From there, Taraia and his brothers went to Hawke’s Bay, pursuing Rakai-weriweri aka Rakaimoari, one of the men of Kahuparore, who had escaped and was said to have taken part of Tūpurupuru's remains with him. They first pursued him to Nuhaka, but he escaped again. Then they followed the coast. At the mouth of the Wairoa, the local people refused to ferry Taraia across the river, so he had Hine-kura (his wife or his daughter) given a full body tattoo, lifted her up, and had his men perform haka around her. The curious locals brought their canoes up close to see what was happening and then Taraia attacked them, seizing their canoes and crossing the river. This was called the Battle of Te Eketia.

Taraia now set off after Rakai-weriweri by sea, with a force that included his wife Hine-pare, his son Rangitaumaha, Tupurupuru's son Rangituehu, his general Te Ao Matarahi, as well as the brothers Tawhao, Ruatekuri, and Rahiri from Ngai Tamawahine. Meanwhile, Rakai-hikuroa, his brother Tikorua and the latter's son Tangiahi set off by land to Mohaka.

=== Battle of Waikoukou ===
Taraia now came to the village of Pukuwheke or Te Puku o te wheki at the mouth of the Aropaoanui River, where Rakai-weriweri had taken refuge. They landed on the opposite shore from Pukuwheke and Taraia threw a rock across the river, hitting Rakai-weriweri on the head and knocking off his koukou (top-knot with feathers in it). Then Taraia led the canoes over the river to attack. They were driven back and Taraia's wife, Hinepare, was left behind on a rock. She shouted out, ākuanei te hanga kine a tēnei wahine waiho ai hei matakitakitanga mate kanohi tangata ke ("the evil part of this woman is about to be a spectacle for strange men!") and smashed a calabash of water on the rock. Taraia and his men mistook the smashing of the calabash for the smashing of Hinepare's skull. He, Tawhao, Te Ao Matarahi, and Te Rangi-tuehu charged back into battle, killed Rakai-weriweri, and conquered Pukuwheke. This was called the Battle of Waikoukou.

=== Conquest of Heipipi ===
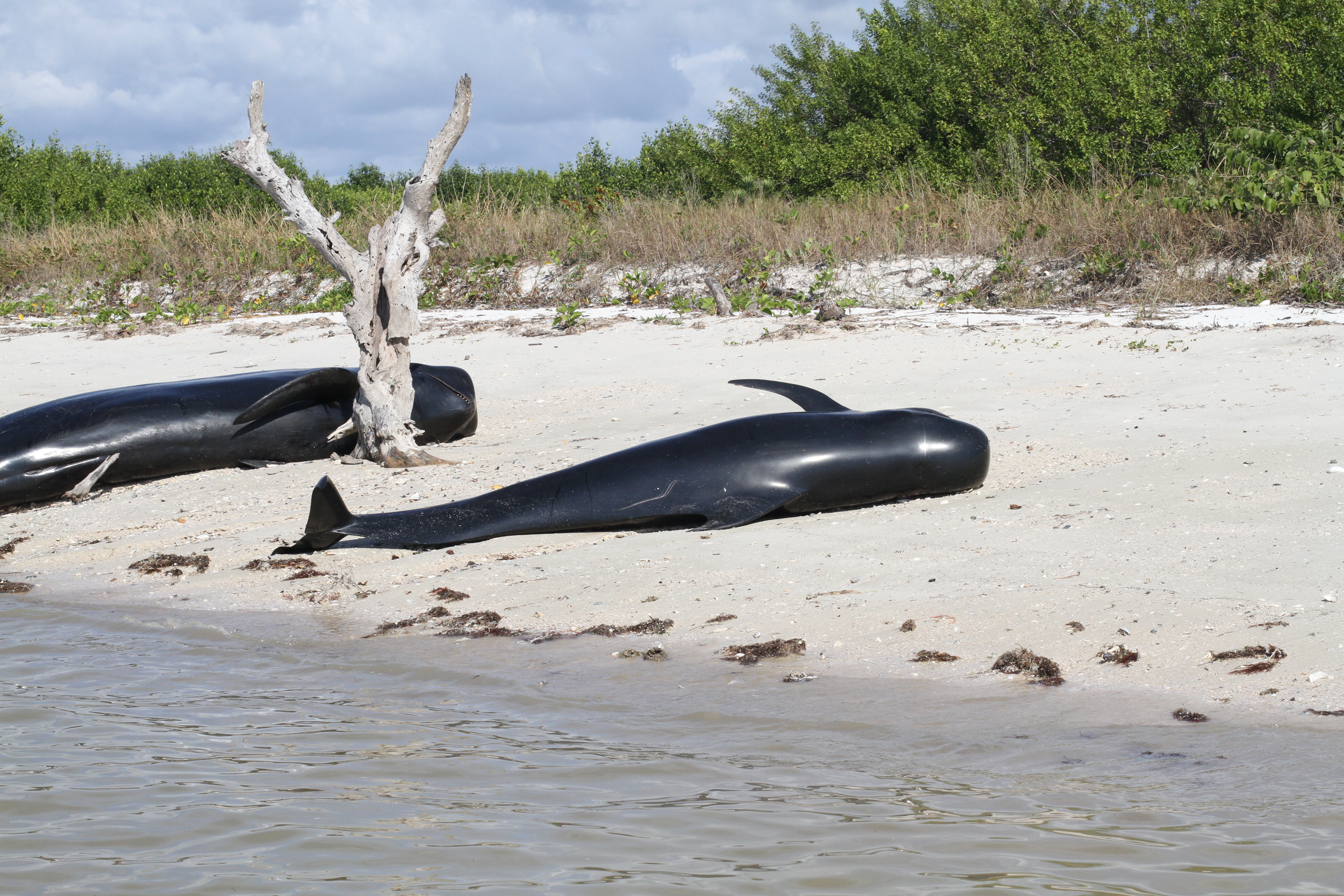
Upokohue (long-finned pilot whales), beached in Florida.

In the battle, they took one Whanganui-a-rotū prisoner. He was the namesake for the surrounding area, the Whanganui-a-rotū lagoon and told them that it was an area rich in pipi and mussels. Tawhao immediately staked a claim to the area, which became known as Te Mara a Tawhao. Whanganui-a-rotū told Taraia about the Tukituki and Ngaruroro Rivers to the south, which had fertile floodplains and plenty of kahawai. As Taraia set out for this land, he claimed it by throwing a calabash into the sea, which washed up on the beach at the place named Te Ipu-a-Taraia ("the bowl of Taraia").

To take control of the area, Taraia had to seize a fortified village called Heipipi (just south of the Esk River), which was occupied by Te Tini o Maruiwi and protected by the tohunga Tunui. The invading force found Tunui's daughter Hinekatorangi out at the shore doing laundry and killed her. Then they set to attacking Heipipi. Before dawn, Taraia and his men lay down on the shore, each one under a black pākē (flax cape). When the people of Heipipi saw them, they thought that they were a pod of upokohue (long-finned pilot whales) that had been stranded by the tide and they ran out to harvest them. Taraia and his men leapt out from under their mats and attacked the unarmed Maruiwi. Meanwhile, Te Ao Matarahi attacked Heipipi from behind, defeating the few people who had remained behind. J. G. Wilson reports that after Taraia's initial attack, Tunui cast a spell, releasing the captured people of Heipipi, then came down and made peace.

=== Conquest of Ōtātara ===
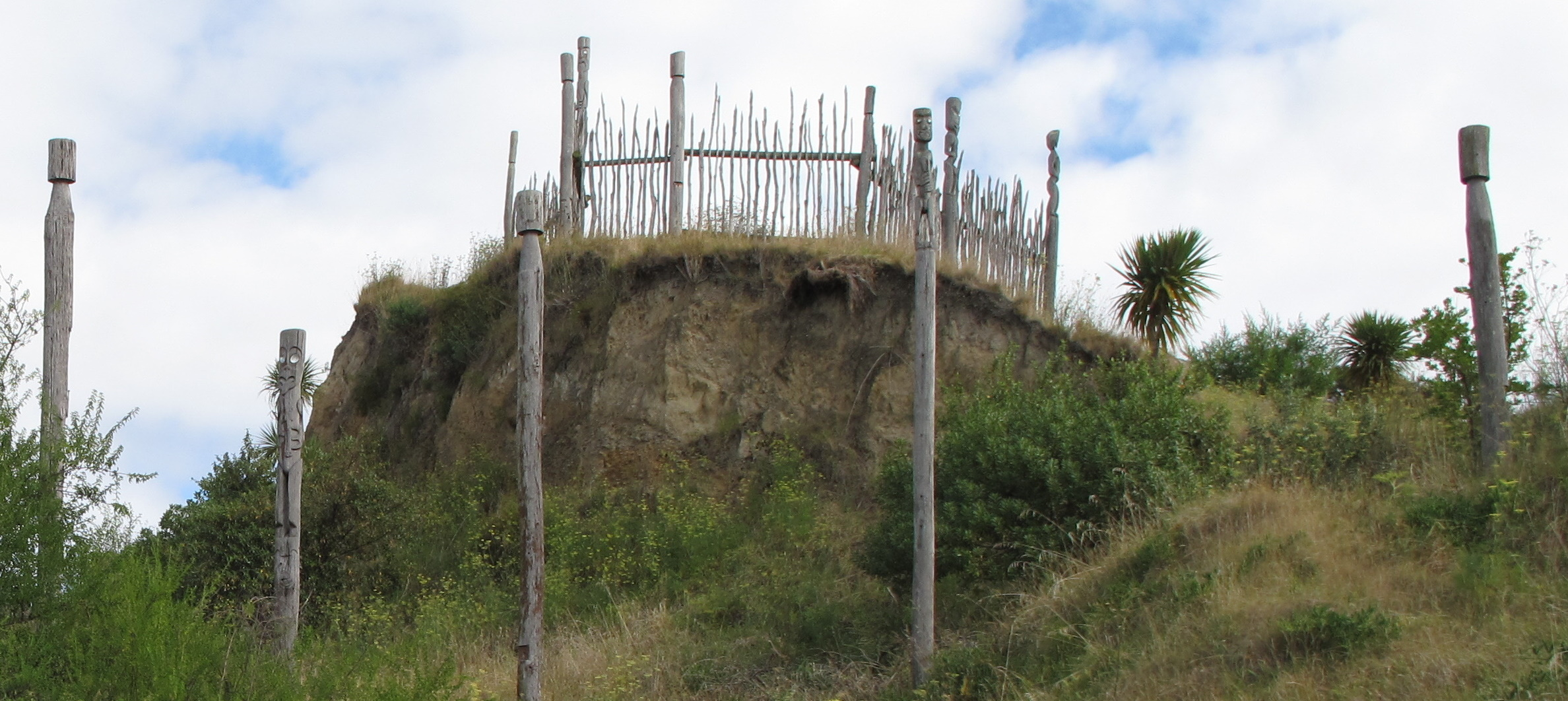
Ōtātara pa, Taradale.

The people of Heipipi told Taraia that the fertile territory to the south was controlled by a fortress at Ōtātara (Taradale) on the Tūtaekurī River. Ōtātara was held by Tū-rauha of Ngāti Awa held it. After Tunui gave them a feast of paua at Puaro a Taraia, they planned their attack.

Ōtātara was extremely well-defended, but the defenders had become complacent. Taraia hid half his force along the northern approach to the fortress and the other half in caves above the river. At dawn, the men in the caves launched an attack. The defenders charged down to meet the attackers, at which point the men hidden to the north of the fortress attacked and took Ōtātara. With this conquest, Taraia had brought the Heretaunga Plains under Ngāti Kahungunu control.

=== Settlement ===
During the attack on Otatara, Te Ao Mararahi had taken one Totara prisoner. When they returned to Wairoa to fetch the rest of their people and bring them to Heretaunga, Taraia and Te Ao Matarahi used Totara as a guide. But Te Ao Matarahi had a feast of Kurī without inviting Totara, so he abandoned him in favour of Taraia. As their canoes came to Hukarere, Totara said "Go straight for Matariki!" (i.e. the Pleiades). Taraia thus turned in to the Ngaruroro River, while Te Ao Matarahi's people mistakenly continued to the Tukituki River. Taraia declared the area Te Ipu o Taraia and thus the Ngaruroro became his territory.

Taraia now divided the land between his relatives. Kahutapere II, one of his commanders, got the land north of the Esk River. Taraia took the area between the Mohaka and the Ngaruroro as the personal demesne of himself and his full siblings, known as Te Hika a Ruarauhanga. He established a base for himself at Tahunamoa at Waiohiki, opposite Ōtātara. Taraia gave the land between the Ngaruroro and Tukituki Rivers to Te Hika a Pāpāuma, the children of Rākei-hikuroa by his first wife, Pāpāuma. Te Ao Matarahi took the area from the Tukituki River to Te Matau-a-Māui. Te Hika a Ruarauhanga's main centre was Tahunamoa at Waihiki. Te Hika a Pāpāuma's was Te Kauhanga near Haumoana. In subsequent centuries Te Hika a Ruarauhanga and Te Hika a Pāpāuma became fierce rivals.

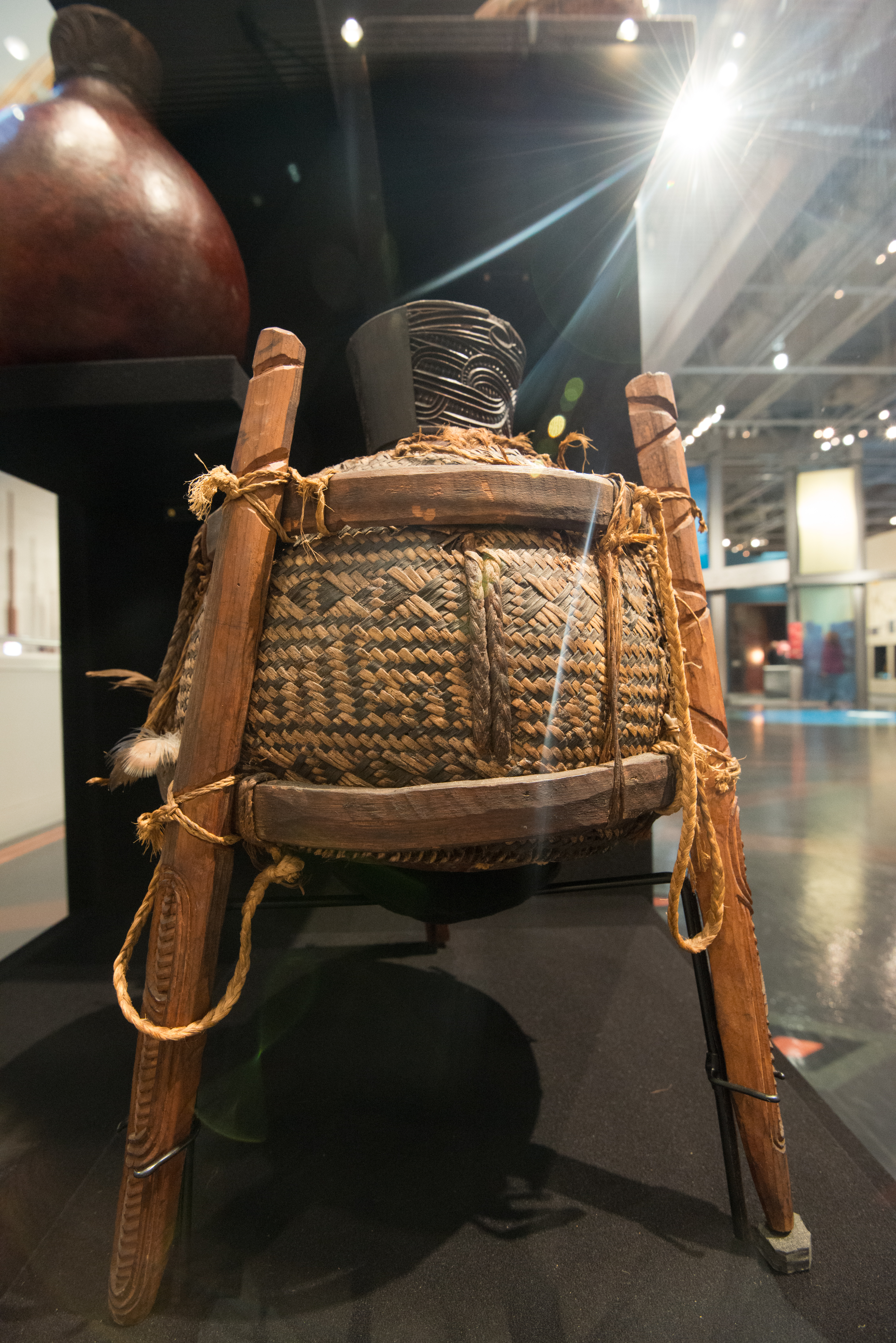
A taha huahua (calabash of preserved bird meat), Te Papa Tongarewa.

After the defeat, Tū-rauha had fled into the interior. Taraia took pity on him and his followers and made a peace agreement, under which Taraia gave his nephew Te Rangi-tuehu to Tū-rauha to become his people's new rangatira. This agreement was sealed by making Te Rangi-tuehu the foster-son of Tū-rakura aka Rakeitekura, who was Tū-rauha's daughter. They subsequently married and their daughter, Hine-i-ao subsequently married Taraia's son Te Rangitaumaha. Taraia and Rangituehu subsequently quarrelled. Rangituehu said that his territory was poor. When he sent a messenger to Taraia asking for huahua (preserved birds), Taraia sent him away empty handed, saying "When [Rangituehu's] father was alive, he was called a man, a chief, but now that he is dead, he is a nobody." At the mouth of the Ngaruroro river, he hit Taraia in the face with a kahawai fish.

Tū-rauha's son Tumahuki and his people, Ngāti Mahu long mourned the loss of their land and mana as a result of Taraia's invasion. One of their traditional laments includes the lines:

E tama e tangi nei, he tangi kai pea
Kaore nei e tama he kainga i a taua
...
Ka tau mai Taraia nga ngutu awa kahawai
Kai Ngaruroro
Ka whati mai o tipuna ki runga te tahuna
Tapapa noa ai

Translation:

My son who is crying, are you crying for food?
There is no land my son that is ours
...
When Taraia came
To the kahawai river mouths at Ngaruroro
Your ancestors were driven away
To the banks and there squatted without right

=== Conflict with Te Hika a Pāpāuma ===
According to Meihana Takihi, Taraia built a great wharenui named Te Raroakiaki. In order to solemnise it, he planned for his daughter Te Raupare to be thrown into the main post hole when it was erected in the night. Te Raupare's mother, Hine-pare, asked Taraia's half-brother Tuwhakawhiurangi to switch the child for a stone. When the time came in the service for Te Raupare to be thrown into the posthole, Tuwhakawhiurangi threw in a stone and hid Te Raupare under his cloak. Tuwhakawhiurangi expected that he would get to marry Te Raupare once she grew up, but she ran off with Te Ariari of Te Hika a Pāpāuma.

The two of them hid in a bush called Pokairikiriki and planned to run away to Tūranganui-a-Kiwa. Te Raupare wanted to take some of her family's feathers with her, so she snuck back into the house. Hine-pare caught her, thinking she was a thief, and Taraia found out that she was planning to run off with Te Ariari. Taraia declared her to be Tuwhakawhiurangi's wife. Tuwhakawhiurangi led a war party against Te Ariari; Te Ariari fled to Te Kauhanga and led a war party of Te Hika a Pāpāuma to attack Taraia at Tahunamoa. They destroyed Te Raroakiaki and threw the stone atua into the posthole. Then they withdrew to Te Totara, between the Turamoe and Mangaroa swamps.

Tuwhakawhiurangi marshalled a new war party. Taraia sent his illegitimate son Te Huikai to get his war cloak from Rakei-hikaroa, who also gave him a weapon. When he returned the war party approached Te Totara in the night. They failed to surprise them, so they moved on to Waikoukou, which they took. Takaha, chief at Te Kauhanga, led his men out. The two war parties met on the Pekapeka ridge near Pakipaki and fought a battle called Te Arai a Turanga. Te Hika a Papauma lost. Huikai killed Takaha. Te Ariari was killed. A stone on the hill called Te Ahi Manawa marked the spot where Te Hika a Pāpāuma's hearts were eaten.

Takaha's nephew, Tumapuhia, learnt of the defeat and spent three years raising a war party. Then he led it up from the Wairarapa to the Ngaruroro River, where they pulled the lid off the hole in which Taraia had stored offerings of shark and stingrays to the gods. Taraia was at Pakowhai. Together with Hine-pare and his brother Uewherua, he set out for Tahunamoa in order to confront Tumapuhia. Taraia had thought that he would be safe because Hine-pare came from Te Hika a Pāpāuma, but Tumapuhia killed him and Uewherua, sparing only Hine-pare herself.

Taraia's children came from Kohukete, met their mother and attacked Tumapuhia, but they were defeated. After Tumapuhia had returned to the Wairarapa, Tuwhakawhiurangi enlisted the help of Pokia and Tahina of Ngāti Rakaipaaka and together they defeated Te Hika a Pāpāuma. One of the only survivors was Te Whatuiapiti, who would carry on the conflict in the next generation.

== Family ==
Taraia married his niece Hinepare, daughter of his half-brother Tamanuhiri:

- Te Rangitaumaha, who married his cousin Hine-i-ao and had four daughters and four sons:

- Te Huhuti (daughter), who married Te Whatuiāpiti and was ancestor of the Ngāti Te Whatuiāpiti hapū.
- Ruatiti (daughter)
- Manuitiatoi (daughter)
- Parengenge (daughter)
- Taraia (son)
- Hinehore (son)
- Hikateko (son), who married Huakirangi and was ancestor of Ngāti Hinepare
- Kaiaotea (son)

- Te Raupare, who was the cause of a war between Te Ariari, Taraia, and Tuwhakawhiurangi.

He also married Hinemoa, widow of Tū-purpuru:

- Karaka

He also married Hinekura:

- Te Rangikohea

- Te Ao, ancestor of Ngai Te Ao

He also had an illegitimate son:

- Te Huikai (son)

== Bibliography ==
- Grace, John Te Herekiekie (1959). Tuwharetoa: The history of the Maori people of the Taupo District. Auckland [N.Z.]: A.H. & A.W. Reed.
- Hill, Richard S. (1998). WAI 436: Ngai Tane, Ngati Pahauwera and the Crown: A Report for the Waitangi Tribunal (PDF).
- Jones, Pei Te Hurinui; Biggs, Bruce (2004). Ngā iwi o Tainui : nga koorero tuku iho a nga tuupuna = The traditional history of the Tainui people. Auckland [N.Z.]: Auckland University Press. ISBN 1869403312.
- Mitchell, J. H. (2014). Takitimu: A History of Ngati Kahungunu. Libro International. ISBN 978-1-877514-72-2.
- Parsons, Patrick (1997). WAI 400: The Ahuriri Block: Maori Cusomary Interests (PDF).
