= War of Te Kupenga =

Māori conflict in New Zealand during the 1820s

| Date | early 1820s |
| Location | Central North Island, New Zealand |
| Result | Ngāti Tūwharetoa victory Rise of Mananui Te Heuheu Tūkino II |

Belligerents
| Ngāti Te Whatuiāpiti and Ngāti Hinepare | Ngāti Tūwharetoa |

Commanders and leaders
| Haemania; Pakapaka; Tareahi; Te Matatohikura; Te Wharetoetoe | Mananui Te Heuheu Tūkino II |

The War of Te Kupenga was a conflict in early 1820s New Zealand in which the Ngāti Te Whatuiāpiti and Ngāti Hinepare hapū of Ngāti Kahungunu fought against Ngāti Tūwharetoa

The war arose out a marriage dispute within Ngāti Te Whatuiāpiti. A number of their chiefs responded to this by leading an attack on the east coast of Lake Taupō, in which they attacked a hapū of Tūwharetoa with only a tangential connection to the dispute. Ngāti Tūwharetoa responded with an attack on the heartland of Ngāti Te Whatuiāpiti in the Ahimanawa Range, led by the young Mananui Te Heuheu Tūkino II. The war ended when the rest of Ngāti Kahungunu chose not to seek revenge for this attack. Alongside battles with Ngāti Maru, the war of Te Kupenga played an important role in Te Heuheu's rise to become paramount chief of Ngāti Tūwharetoa, a position still held by his family today.

== Background ==
Places in the war
1 Tarawera
2 Te Haroto
3 Motutere
4 Te Hatepe
5 Waimarino
6 Te Rapa
7 Te Toropapa
8 Tahau

Ngāti Tūwharetoa had established themselves around Lake Taupō in the sixteenth century. In the early nineteenth century, the iwi was only loosely bound together, with two main centres of gravity – Ngāti Te Rangiita on the southeast coast of the lake, with its main centre at Motutere, and Ngāti Turumākina at the mouth of the Tongariro River at the south end of the lake. There was a tradition of a paramount chief with some authority over the whole tribe in matters of war, but this position was really a first among equals and, after the death of Herea around 1820, the position had been left vacant.

Ngāti Te Whatuiāpiti was a hapū of Ngāti Kahungunu, who had established themselves in the area around Tarawera and Te Harota in the Ahimanawa Range under Te Hikawera in the late seventeenth century. There were two rangatira in the hapū, Pakapaka and Werewere or Te Pakinga, who belonged to different branches of the descendants of Te Hikawera. Because of their closeness to one another and in order to reunify the branches, they agreed that Pakapaka's son Te Aria would marry Werewere's daughter, Te Uira. However, while Werewere and Te Uira were visiting Taupō, Te Uira fell in love with Tumu, a rangatira of Ngāti Te Rangiita and married him instead.

== Course of the war ==
=== Attack on Ngāti Uemarorangi ===
Te Aria and his people were furious. Pakapaka gathered a war party to get revenge, along with Haemania, Matatohikura, and Tareahi. However, instead of attacking Ngāti Te Rangiita, they attacked Ngāti Uemarorangi and killed their main rangatira, Kikitara. They advanced on Motutere, the main fortress of Ngāti Te Rangiita, but decided that its fortifications were too strong for them and departed for home in two groups.

=== Murder of Taupō and flight of Kahu ===
The force travelled back to Ahimanawa in two groups: a forward guard of Ngāti Te Whatuiapiti and the main force, composed of Ngāti Hinepare and the captured war prisoners., which was commanded by Te Matatohikura. When the advance force reached Te Hatepe, they killed a local man called Taupō. He was related to Ngāti Hinepare – two of his sons were actually in the war party. When the main body learnt about the murder, Te Matatohikura executed the killers.

In the meanwhile, however, Taupō's daughter, Kahu, had escaped and set out to inform her relative, Mananui Te Heuheu Tūkino II about the murder and to get him to take revenge. When she approached Waimarino pā, she sang the following song, which is preserved by Hoata Te Hata and John Te Herekiekie Grace, and forms part of a larger song preserved in Āpirana Ngata’s Nga Moteatea:

Whakaarahia mai te marama i te pae
Kihau ra taua i roko kakahi ake
Ka taurua taua e.
Me kowai hoki tot aua tangata
Mana taua e tiki mai?
E wewete taku mate
Ka ea ki te aoturoa i?

— Kahu
Translation:

The Moon is rising over the horizon.
We are not able to raise the weapons of war,
And we have waited long.
Who indeed is our man who will help us?
Who will release me from my affliction
And avenge me in this world of light?

— Grace 1959, p. 253

The younger brother of Kikitara was present at Waimarino and heard this. He agreed to go on to Te Heuheu’s village at Te Rapa and seek his support in avenging both the murder of Taupō and the death of Kikitara.

=== Invasion of the Ahimanawa Range ===
As a result of Kahu’s appeal, Te Heuheu II gathered a force from the whole of Ngāti Tūwharetoa and set out, reaching the homeland of Ngāti Te Whatuiapiti in the Ahimanawa Range in six days. They attacked and destroyed the villages of Te Toropapa and Tahau the day after their arrival. The day after that they surrounded Te Kupenga, capturing it after five days’ siege. The important Ngāti Te Whatuiapiti rangatira Te Wharetoetoe was killed.

== Aftermath ==
As a result of the war, Ngāti Te Whatuiapiti were driven across the Mohaka River, which became the new border between Ngāti Tūwaretoa and Ngāti Kahungunu. Te Hueheu set up border posts on the Titiokura saddle, to mark the boundary, and hung Te Wharetoetoe's head on the path from the saddle to Taupō, naming the location Te Whakairinga-o-te-upoko o Wharetoetoe.

== Bibliography ==
- Te Hata, Hoeta; Fletcher, H. J. (1918). "Ngati-Tuhare-toa occupation of Taupo-nui-a-tia". Journal of the Polynesian Society. 27: 38–46.
- Grace, John Te Herekiekie (1959). Tuwharetoa: The history of the Maori people of the Taupo District. Auckland [N.Z.]: A.H. & A.W. Reed.
- Waitangi Tribunal (2013). Te Kāhui Maunga: The National Park District Inquiry Report (Wai 1130) (PDF). Vol. 1. Lower Hutt [N. Z.]: Legislation Direct. ISBN 9781869563059.
