= Te Kapuamātotoru =

Places in the life of Te Kapuamātotoru
1 Pohonui o hine
2 Wairoro
3 Whereinga
4 Hikawai

Te Kapuamātotoru was a Māori rangatira (chieftain) of the Ngāti Kahungunu iwi and ancestor of the Ngāi Te Kapuamātotoru hapū based on the middle reaches of the Wairoa River in northern Hawke Bay, New Zealand. He was active in the eighteenth century. Through his marriage to Te Whewhera, he established several local lines of chiefs that remained important in the region into modern times.

== Life ==
Te Kapuamātotoru's father was Puruaute of Ngāti Rakaipaaka. His mother was Te Matakainga-i-te-tihi, the queen (hei tihi) of the Ngāi Tamaterangi hapū of the Wairoa river valley. His grandfathers were Te Huki and Tapuwae. Only descendants of these two men were traditionally considered to be aristocrats among the Ngāti Kahungunu of the northern Hawke Bay area. As a descendant of both Te Kapuamātotoru was particularly well-born. Through his father, he was a direct male-line descendant of Rakaipaaka, and through both parents he was descended from Kahungunu and Tamatea Arikinui, who captained the Takitimu waka from Hawaiki to New Zealand. He was born at Pohonui-o-hine pā on the western bank of the Wairoa river. He had two younger full brothers, Te Kahu-o-te-rangi, ancestor of Ngāti Pāhauwera, and Mātaitai.

When Te Kapuamātotoru reached adulthood, a chief of Ngāti Rakaipaaka called Manawa took him to his pā, Wairoro, located on the Tahaenui River. There he married a commoner lady, called Te Aramoana, and they had a child. At this, Manawa said E Tama, tau wahine e moe ai koe ko te ruruwai na ("Son, what a rubbish woman you have married!") and said that he should have married his well-born cousin Te Whewhera, a granddaughter of Tapuwae, who had recently married Te Kakari and had a child herself. Te Kapuamātotoru followed this advance and married Te Whewhera. His child by Te Aramoana and her child by Te Kakari were killed using dark magic "so as to leave no prior issue to this union, thus commencing with the marriage a clean line of descent." Te Kapuamātotoru and Te Whewhera then settled at Whereinga and Hikawai, near modern Frasertown. In expectation of many noble offspring from the new marriage, these pā were dubbed Te Pareke-reketanga a nga Rangatira ("Seed-bed of chiefs").

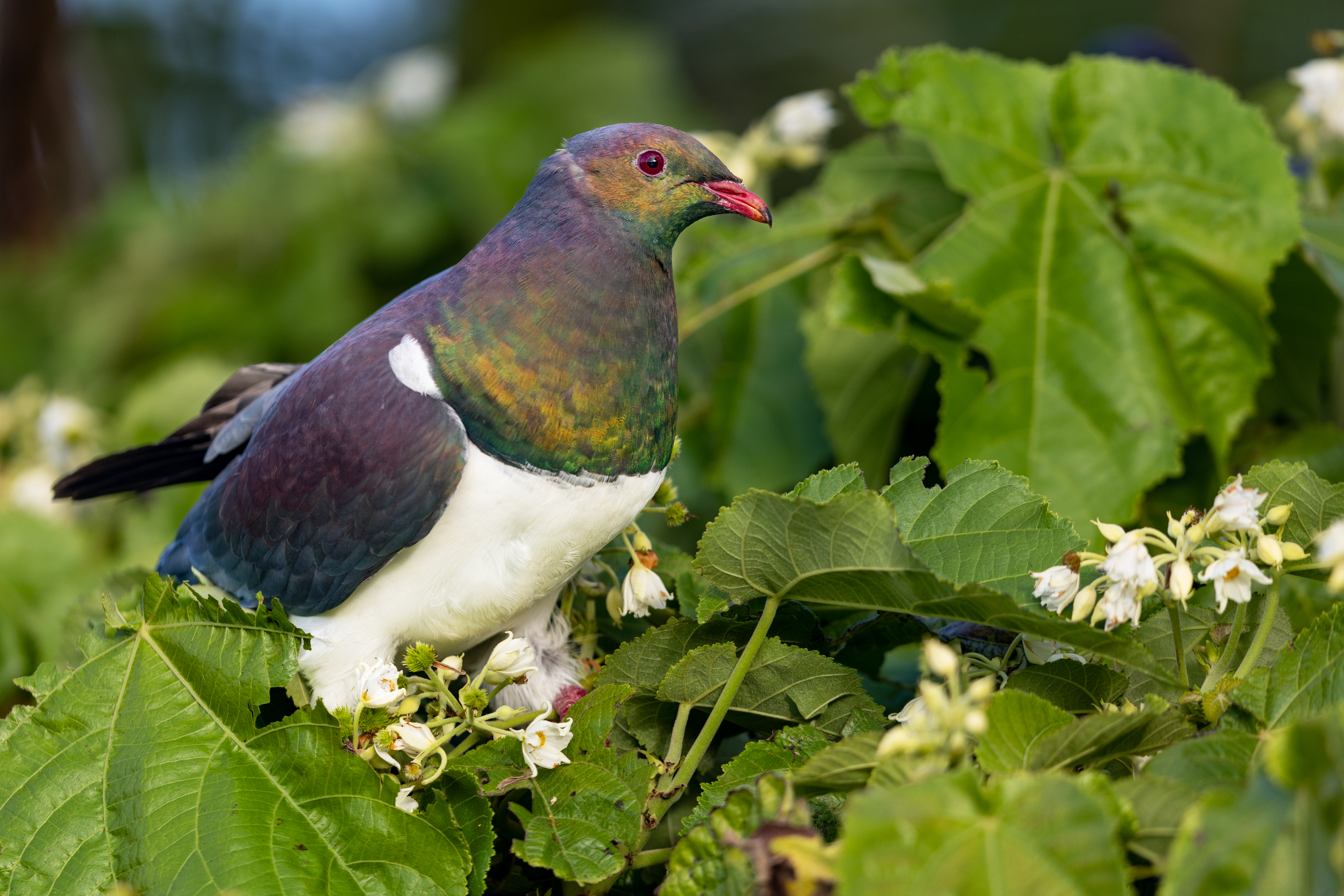
Kererū roosting in a tree.

Te Kapuamātotoru opened up reserved hunting and fishing areas and settled people on them in exchange for bringing tributes of food, "to make Te Whewhera's milk flow"(Māori: hei wai u mo Te Whewhera). These included hunting grounds for birds at Whakapunake. According to Ngāti Kahungunu, Pakitua, ancestor of Ngāti Pakitua was settled at Wairau-kereku and Lake Waikaremoana to hunt kererū, while Takupumaro and Te Whakaangiangi were settled at Lake Ohuia and Lake Wairau to catch eels. Subsequently, Pakitua's grandson Tamahore began to claim greater authority over the land at Waikaremoana and stopped sending food, so Te Kapumatotoru had him killed with magic. This led to a battle between Tuhoe and Ngati Hore. These events formed the basis of a successful appeal before a parliamentary commission by Te Kapuamātotoru's descendants to be included among the owners of the Waikaremoana block in 1907.

== Family ==
Te Kapuamātotoru and Te Whewhera had eight children, who were settled as paramount chiefs in various locations across the region, where their descendants maintained interests in the areas as of 1946. These settlements were achieved through arranged marriages which renewed the network formed by Te Huki in the previous two generations. These children were:

- Hine-maka (daughter), who settled in Heretaunga.
- Te Ruruku o te Rangi (son), ancestor of Ngāi Te Ruruku.
- Te Ipu (son), who settled at Whakaki.
- Raeroa (son), who settled at Paeroa.
- Hineori (daughter), who settled in the Upper Wairoa river valley.
- Hinerara (son), who settled at Kihitu.
- Kokotangiao (son), who settled at Ruataniwha.
- Hine-i-nohi (daughter), who settled at Waihirere.

== Bibliography ==
- Mitchell, J. H. (2014). Takitimu: A History of Ngati Kahungunu. Libro International. ISBN 978-1-877514-72-2.
- Parsons, Patrick (1997). WAI 400: The Ahuriri Block: Maori Cusomary Interests (PDF).
- Ballara, Angela (1998). Iwi: The Dynamics of Māori Tribal Organisation from C.1769 to C.1945. Victoria University Press. ISBN 978-0-86473-328-3.
