= Waikōau River (Fiordland) =

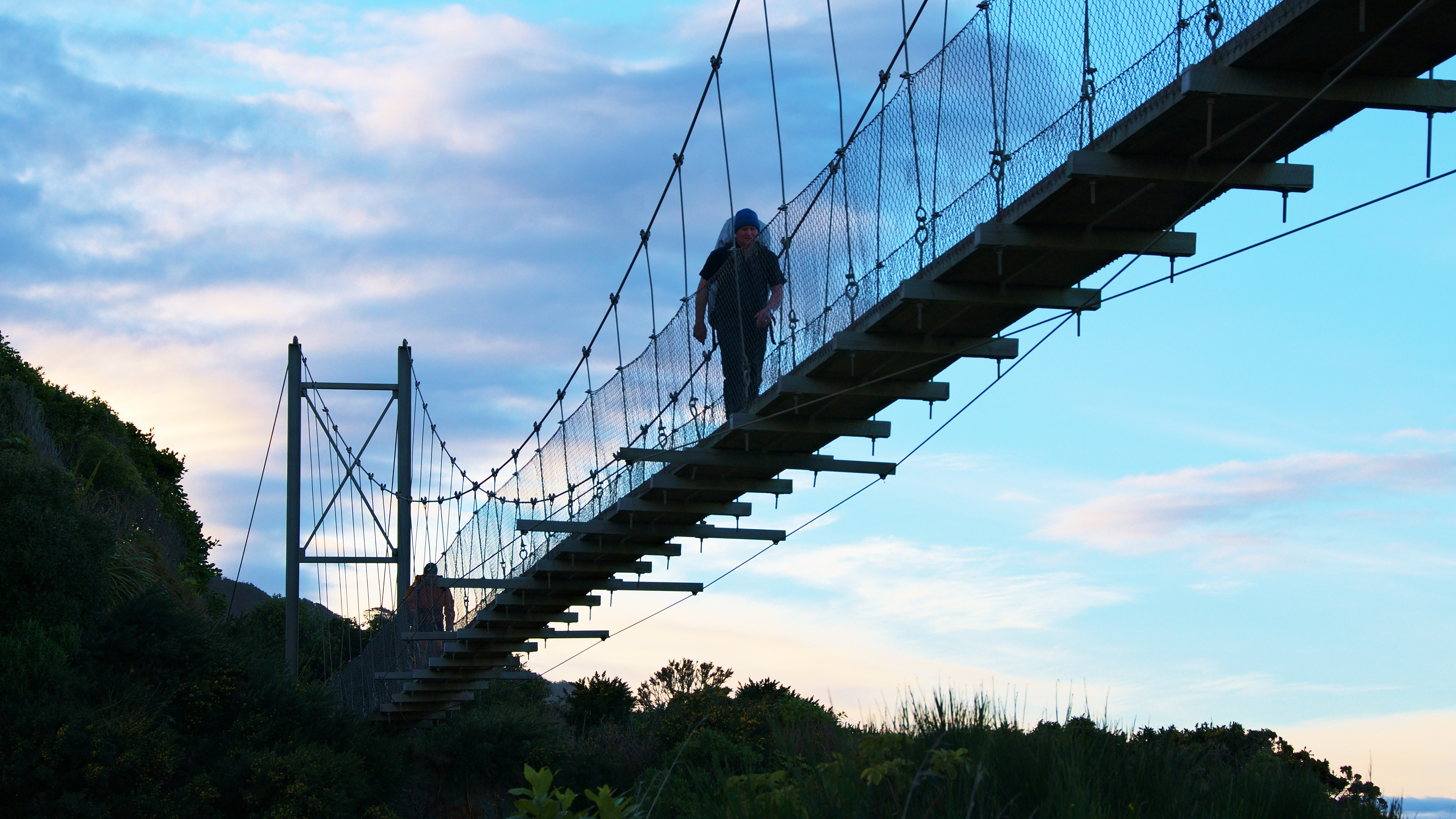
- Swing bridge over Waikōau River, Tuatapere Hump Ridge Track
- Route of Waikōau River
- Mouth of Waikōau River Waikōau River (Fiordland) (South Island) Waikōau River (Fiordland) (New Zealand)

Location
- Country: New Zealand
- Region: Southland
- District: Southland

Physical characteristics
- Source
  - coordinates: 46°05′08″S 167°19′04″E
- Mouth
  - location: Te Waewae Bay
  - coordinates: 46°08′59″S 167°26′42″E
  - elevation: 0 metres (0 ft)

Basin features
- Progression: Waikōau River → Te Waewae Bay → Foveaux Strait

The Waikōau River is a river in southern Fiordland, New Zealand. Since 21 June 2019 the official name has been Waikōau River. Waikōau River North Branch has been the official name of a tributary, which joins the river about a kilometre from the sea, since 19 December 2019. Rising north of the Hump Ridge, it flows south-eastward into Te Waewae Bay.

The New Zealand Ministry for Culture and Heritage gives a translation of "waters of the shag" for Waikōau.

There is also a Waikoau River in Hawke's Bay, which flows into the Aropaoanui River.

== See also ==
- List of rivers of New Zealand
