= Waikōau River (Hawke's Bay) =

River in New Zealand

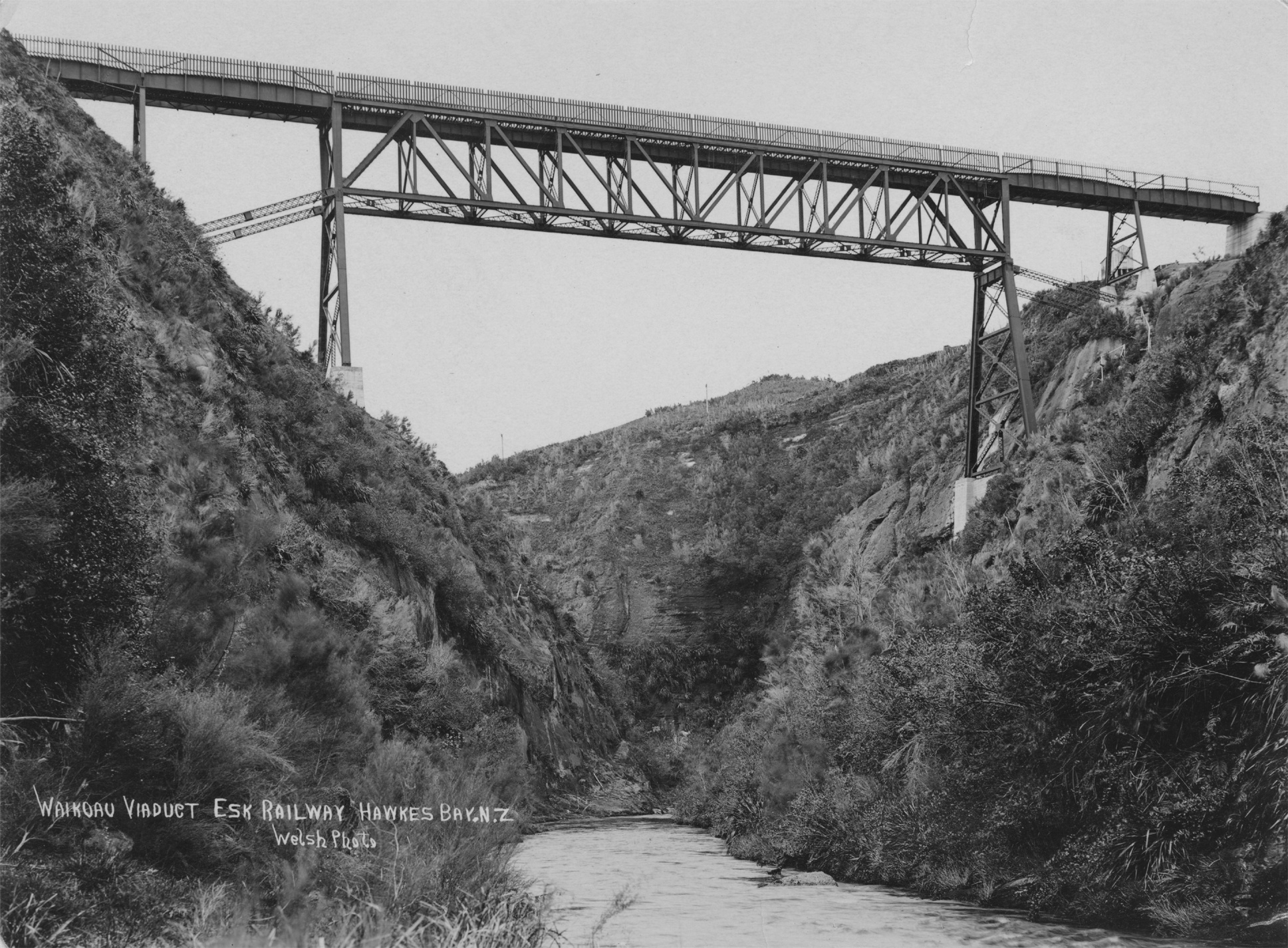
- The Waikoau Viaduct photographed in 1928
- Route of the Waikōau River
- Mouth of the Waikōau River Waikōau River (Hawke's Bay) (North Island)
- Native name: Waikōau (Māori)

Location
- Country: New Zealand
- Island: North Island
- Region: Hawke's Bay
- District: Hastings

Physical characteristics
- Source: Confluence of the Waikōau Stream and Mangaroa Stream
  - coordinates: 39.16573°S 176.81693°E
- Mouth: Aropaoanui River
  - coordinates: 39°15′51″S 176°54′14″E

Basin features
- Progression: Waikōau River → Aropaoanui River → Hawke Bay → Pacific Ocean
- Tributaries
  - left: Mahiaruhe Stream, Tararere Stream
- Bridges: Waikoau Viaduct, Waikōau Gorge Bridge, Waikōau Bridge

The Waikōau River is a river of the Hawke's Bay Region of New Zealand's North Island. It flows south south-east from the confluence of the Waikōau Stream and Mangaroa Stream near Blue Lake. When it meets the Mairau Stream, the waterway forms the Aropaoanui River.

== Geography ==
The Waikōau Stream and Mangaroa Stream originate from the Maungaharuru Range. Lake Tūtira and Lake Waikōpiro flow into Sandy Creek, a tributary of the Mahiaruhe Stream which flows into the river. Traditionally, the Mahiaruhe Stream was considered two sections by Ngāti Kahungunu: Tūtira Stream, the outflow of Lake Tūtira, and south of the ford of Maheawha, known as the Maheawha Stream. Lake Orakai, to the southwest of Lake Tūtira, flows into the Waikōau River. Much of the river flows through farmlands, scrub and forestry, with some sections being deeply carved gorges flowing through limestone. The river flows underneath State Highway 2.

== Recreation ==
The river is used as a seasonal trout fishery.

== History ==
The river has traditional significance for Maungaharuru Tangitū-associated hapū of Ngāti Kahungunu. The Waikoau Viaduct, a railway viaduct part of the Palmerston North–Gisborne Line, was constructed in 1928.

== See also ==
- List of rivers of New Zealand
