= Te Hikawera =

Places in the life of Te Hikawera
1 Rotoatara
2 Oueroa
3 Manahuna
4 Otatara
5 Kaimata
6 Tarawera
7 Te Purotu
8 Tataraakina
9 Pākira o Hikawera
10 Waitara
11 Bridge Pa

Te Hikawera was a rangatira (chieftain) of the Ngāti Te Whatuiāpiti hapū of Ngāti Kahungunu, around the late seventeenth century. He maintained pā sites at Oueroa, Manahuna, and Kaimata, from which he exercised authority over the whole of Heretaunga. Later he also gained control of the area of Tarawera in the Ahimanawa Range He is responsible for the names of several geographic features in the Hawke’s Bay region and is the ancestor of Ngāti Pārau, formerly known as Ngāti Hikawera.

== Life ==
Te Hikawera was the son of Te Whatuiāpiti and Te Huhuti. His father was the founding ancestor of Ngāti Te Whatuiāpiti. Through both parents, he was a descendant of Rākei-hikuroa and ultimately of Kahungunu; Tamatea, who captained the Tākitimu canoe; and the early explorer Toi, but his mother and father belonged to different branches of the iwi, who had long been at variance. He had two older brothers, Rangiwawahia and Te Wawahanga; one younger brother, Keke; and a younger sister, Mihikitekapua. Hikawera grew up at Rotoatara (about four kilometres east of Pukehou) in the Heretaunga region (Hawke’s Bay).

=== Inheriting Oueroa ===
Since his older brother died young, Te Hikawera inherited the land around Oueroa from his maternal grandfather Te Rangitaumaha and settled at a village in the area called Otatara, sharing the land with Te Rangitaumaha's sons, Hikateko, Hinehore, and Taraia. In this role, he had mana over the hapū of Ngati Hinehore, Ngāti Hineiao, Ngāti Hikateko, Ngāti Mahu, Ngāti Kuke, Ngāti Tu, and Ngāti Hinepare. He also inherited Manahuna from his mother and occupied Otatara and Kaimata.

At this time, the major chief of Ngāti Kahungunu, Kahutapere II, led an invasion of the region around Tarawera to recover the bones of Tupurupuru of Ngāti Kahungunu, which they had taken several generations earlier. Te Hikawera was a descendant of Tupurupuru through his grandmother and a prominent chief himself. Therefore, when Kahutapere II grew old, he married his granddaughters Te Uira and Te Atawhāki to Te Hikawera.

=== Journey to Tarawera ===
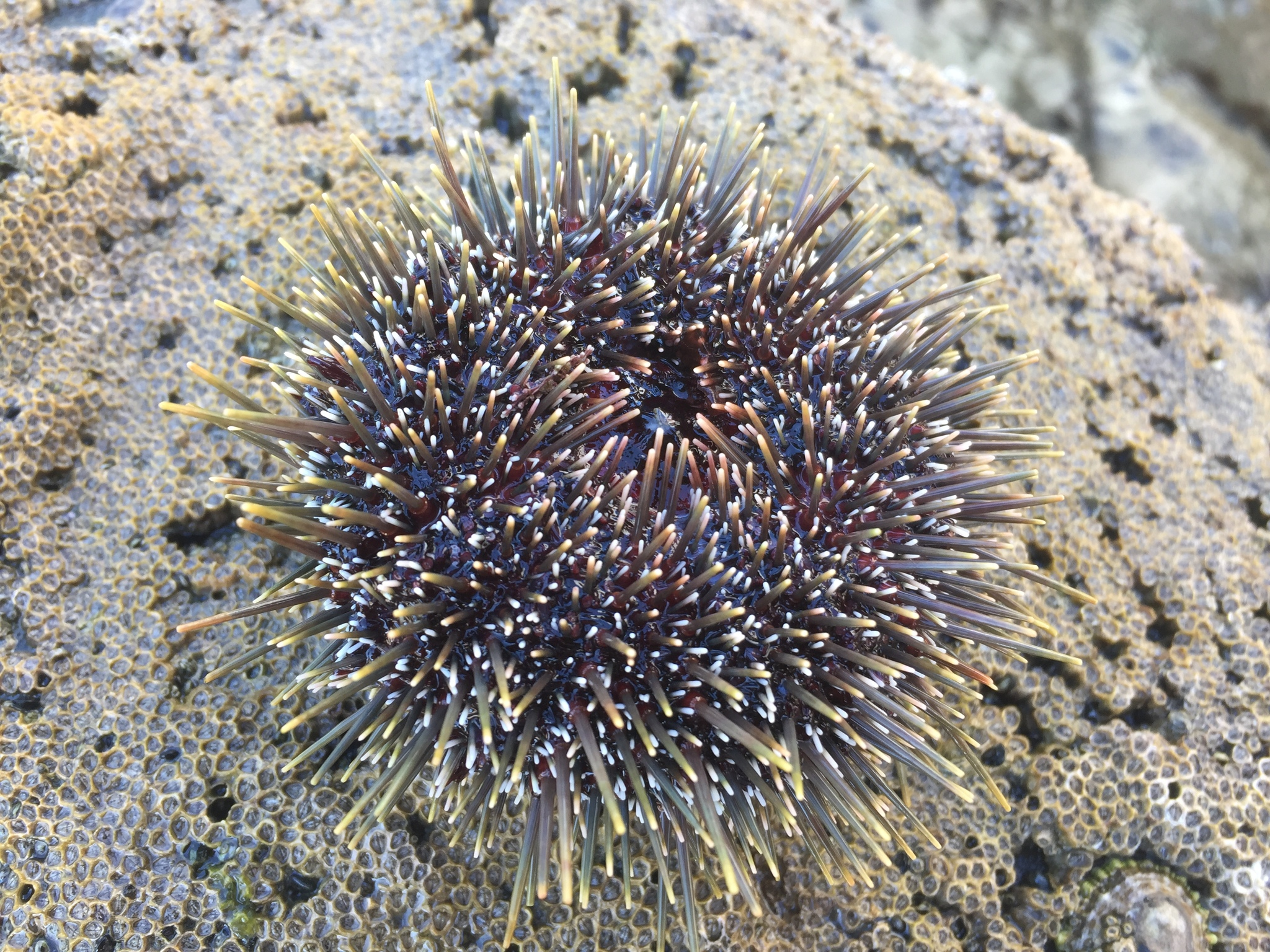
Tatara kina (sea urchin)

After the marriage, Kahutapere sent Te Hikawera and Te Uira to Tarawera to oversee the people that he had settled there. On his arrival, a chieftain of Ngāti Manawa, Tangiharuru, came to see Te Hikawera at a spot on the Mohaka River. He was impressed by Te Uira’s beauty and said “Te Purotu o te wahine!” (What a beautiful wife you have!”), so the place of their meeting came to be known as Te Purotu. As the two chiefs travelled together over the Ahimanawa Range, Tangiharuru said, “Hikawera, why did you bring your beautiful wife to this ugly country which is like the spikes of the tatara kina (sea urchin) of Heretaunga?” As a result, Te Hikawera named the nearby mountain Tataraakina. Having visited Tarawera, Tangiharuru accompanied Te Hikawera home as far as the Waipunga River, where Hikawera took off his bird-feather hat because of the heat and Tangiharuru said “What a nice bald (pākira) head you have!” Te Hikawera found this funny and named the spot Pākira o Hikawera.

Te Hikawera continued on alone to his father’s village, Rotoatara. Te Whatuiāpiti told one of his men, Te Tomo, to get fish and eels ready for a feast in honour of Te Hikawera’s return, but Te Tomo ate the food himself, so Te Whatuiāpiti killed Te Tomo and served him as the feast instead. When Te Hikawera left, he took Te Tomo’s bones with him and made them into spear points, washing them in the Mohaka River at a place that was therefore named Waitara (‘water of spear-points’). Then he made his base at Te Purotu.

From Te Purotu, Te Hikawera went to Tarawera to hunt birds in the winter. At the end of the season, he built a storage hut for his spears and left them in it. However, when he returned the next year, the hut had been burnt down. According to Ngāti Kahungunu, this is how the place came to be called Tarawera (‘burnt spears’).

=== Naming the Tūtaekurī River ===
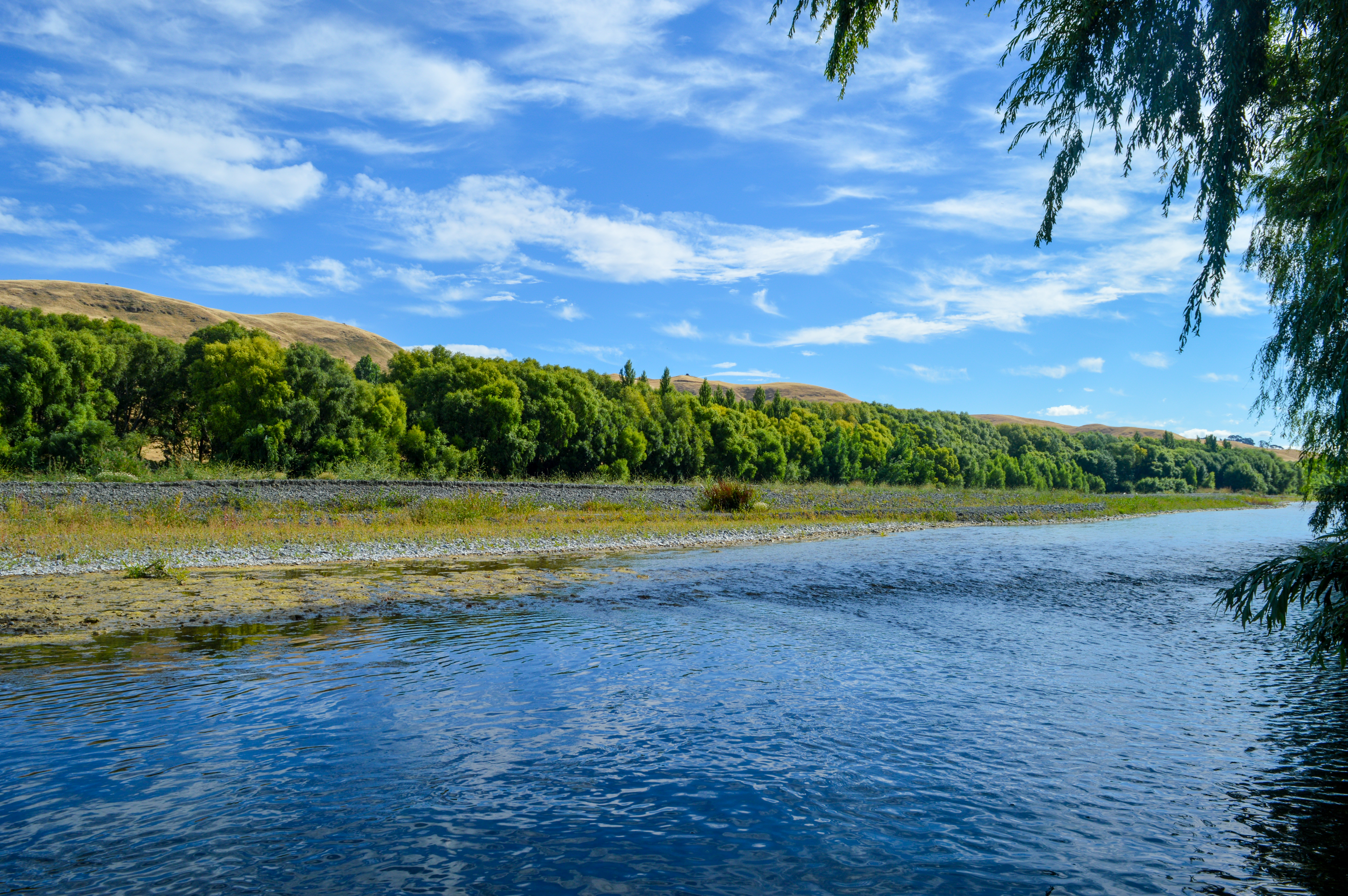
The Tūtaekurī at Puketapu.

Hikawera's cousin, Kaitahi came from Purangahau to Oeroa with people from Ngāti Kahungunu. Hikawera found the travellers en route, eating kōuka (shoots of the Tī kōuka), so he invited them to Te Umukuri and feasted them on eels, freshwater mussels, and kurī (dogs). The innards of the dogs were disposed of in the traditional manner in the nearby river, which therefore gained the name Tūtaekurī River ('dog-excrement'). In thanks for his hospitality, the guests gave Hikawera Te Rangimokai as a wife.

=== Marriage of Whakapakaru ===
Hikawera's uncle, Hikateko, also came with his family to visit Hikawera. During their stay, Hikawera's second daughter, Whakapakaru fell in love with Hikateko's son Ruruarau. Hikateko tried to keep the two apart, because he feared to let his son marry the daughter of a chief who outranked him. As a result of their separation, Whakapakarau became sick and so Hikawera went to Hikateko, who protested that he his son was not sufficiently high-ranking to marry Whakapakarau. Hikawera responded, "Sit down and shut up or I will roast you. Do you want my daughter to die while your son lives?" and Hikateko felt obliged to accept the match. In another version, the marriage was a means for Hikawera to stake a claim to Hikateko's lands and this was the reason for Hikateko's reluctance. He followed this up by marrying his son, Te Kereru to Hikateko's daughters, unifying their lines.

== Family and legacy ==
After Te Hikawera arrived at Oueroa, he married Te Uira i waho and Te Atawhāki, the granddaughters of Kahutapere II. Te Uira i waho was his principal wife and together they had five daughters and three sons:

- Te Rangitohumare (daughter), who married Te Huki and had a son
- Whaka-pakaru (daughter), who married Ruru-a-rau, son of Hikateko, and had six children:

- Tuku (son).
- Te Umu-tao-whare, whose descendants were: Te Wai-awanga – Pakapaka – Te Aria, who was engaged to his cousin Te Uira.
- Taura (daughter), whose descendants were: Te-hiki-ora – Te Pakinga – Te Uira, who was engaged to her cousin Te Aria, but instead married Tumu of Ngāti Rangiita in Ngāti Tūwharetoa, sparking the War of Te Kupenga in the early 1820s.
- Te Wheao
- Kaitoi
- Moko

- Tuku a Te Rangi (son), one of the ancestors of Ngāti Parau. He married Hine-te-wai and had two daughters and a son:

- Numia i te rangi and Hinehare, who both married Manawaakawa, a descendant of Te Hikawera's older brother, Te Wawahanga, and had children:

- Te Operoa
- Tarewai

- Tokopounamu (son)

- Tutura-o-te-rangi
- Rangikamangungu

- Kata (son)
- Hinehou (daughter), who married Pahu
- Kaipawe (daughter), who married kiore
- Hinetara (daughter)
- Tamakitahanga (son), who had two sons, with descendants:

- Te Rakato - Te Waiatanga - Pukupango - Kopapari
- Tihinga - Tiakimanga - Heke - Tiramate - Paora Rerepu, principal chief of Ngāti Pahauwera and one of the signatories on the sale of the Ahuriri Block in 1851 (which became Napier)

Hikawera later married Tauapare, the daughter of Te Apunga (a younger brother of his paternal grandfather), and had two daughters:

- Hinewhare
- Paina

Finally, Hikawera married Te Rangimokai, daughter of Tureia and sister of Te Huki, with whom he had three sons and a daughter:

- Ikaharaki (son)
- Ratuaiterangi (daughter)
- Pake (son)
- Te Kereru (son), one of the ancestors of Ngāti Pārau. He married Taotahi and Te Iwikohurehure, daughters of Hikateko.

The Hikawera II wharenui at Mangaroa Marae in Bridge Pa is named after Te Hikawera. It is used by the Ngāti Pōporo and Ngāti Rahunga hapū of Ngāti Kahungunu.

== Bibliography ==
- Te Hata, Hoeta; Fletcher, H. J. (1918). "Ngati-Tuhare-toa occupation of Taupo-nui-a-tia". Journal of the Polynesian Society. 27: 38–46.
- Grace, John Te Herekiekie (1959). Tuwharetoa: The history of the Maori people of the Taupo District. Auckland [N.Z.]: A.H. & A.W. Reed.
- Parsons, Patrick (1997). WAI 400: The Ahuriri Block: Maori Cusomary Interests (PDF).
- Reed, A. W. (2016). Māori Place Names : Their Origins and Meanings (Fourth ed.). Auckland. ISBN 9780947506520.
- Ballara, Angela (2011). "Te Pareihe". teara.govt.nz.
