= Rakaipaaka =

Maori chieftain

Places in the conflict with Tutekohi and migration of Rakaipaaka and Hinemanuhiri
1 Waerengaahika
2 Tūranga
3 Kaitaratahi ridge
4 Te Mania in Marumaru
5 Māhia Peninsula
6 Nūhaka
7 Moumoukai

Rakaipaaka was a Māori rangatira (chieftain) of the Ngāti Kahungunu iwi and ancestor of the hapū of Ngāti Rakaipaaka. He grew up in the area of modern Gisborne, but was defeated in battle by Tu-te-kohi and resettled at Moumoukai on the Nūhaka River in northern Hawke's Bay, where his descendants still live today. In his later life, he supported his nephew Tama-te-rangi in a conflict with Ngāi Tauira.

== Life ==
Rakaipaaka was the son of Kahukuranui and Tū-teihonga. Through his father he was a direct descendant of Tamatea Arikinui, captain of the Tākitimu canoe. He was born at Waerengaahika (modern Hexton, near Gisborne). He had one full sister, Hinemanuhiri, two paternal half-brothers, Rākei-hikuroa and Tamanuhiri, one paternal half-sister, Rongomai-tara, and one maternal half-sister, Tu Rumakina. As an adult, Rakaipaaka lived at Waerengaahika with the family of Hinemanuhiri and controlled the area west of modern Gisborne as far as the Te Ārai River.

When Rākei-hikuroa was defeated by Kahutapere and Te Māhaki-a-tauhei, he decided that he had to leave the region and asked Rakaipaaka to accompany him, but the latter refused and Rākei-hikuroa prophesied he pai ra kia kore koe e puhia e te hau ("It would be well in future had you done so, that you would not have been blown away in the storm"). Sometime later Rakaipaaka was defeated by Tu-te-kohi and forced to migrate south.

=== Conflict with Tu-te-kohi ===
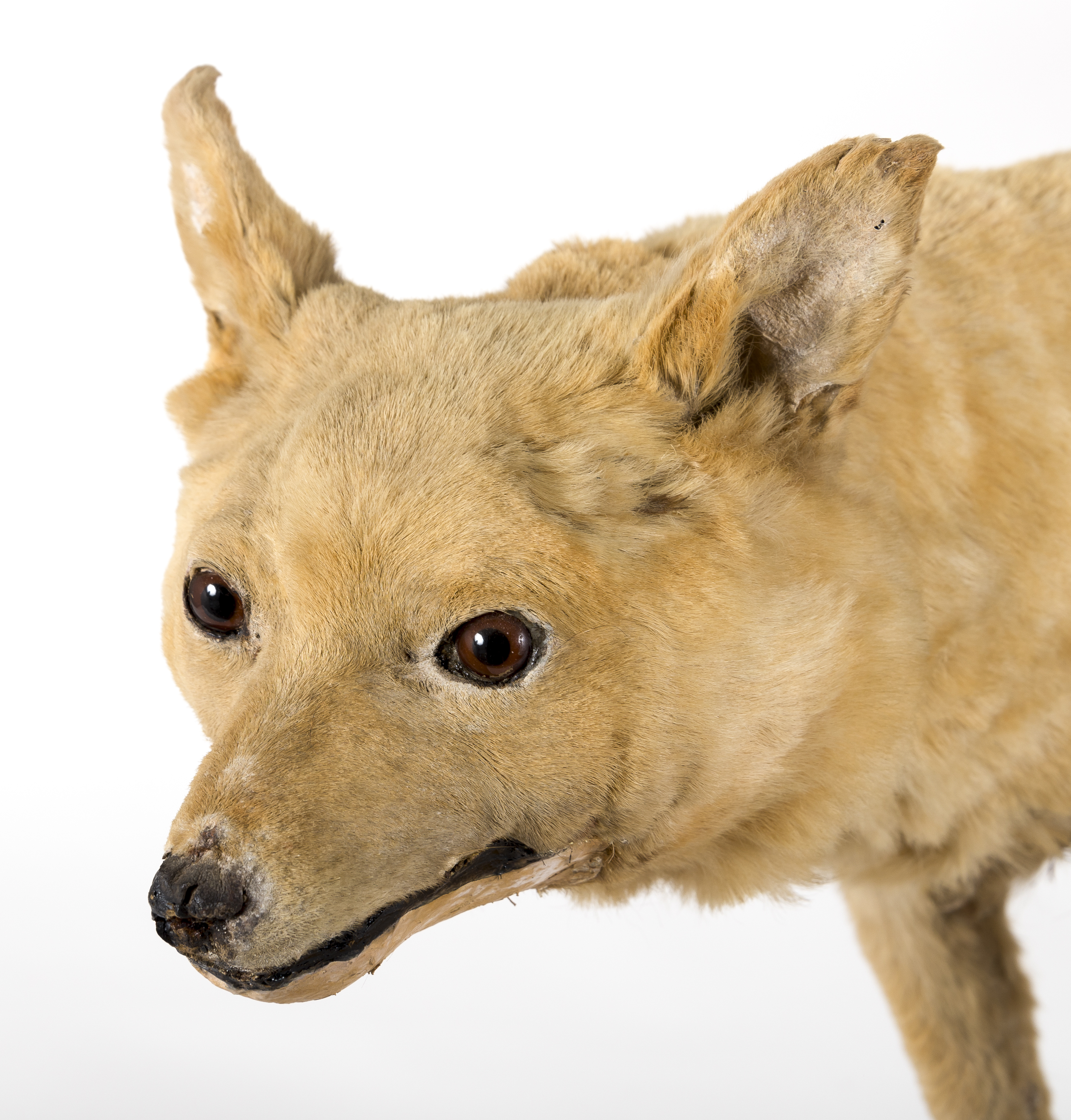
Kurī (Māori dog), Otago Museum

Tu-te-kohi, the rangatira based at Tūranga (modern Gisborne), invited Rakaipaaka to visit him, but offered poor hospitality, giving all the best food to his kurī (dog), called Kauere-huanui, which he allowed to run around all over the eating area. Rakaipaaka restrained his anger and went home, but one of his followers, Whakaruru-a-nuku snuck back into the village, killed the dog, and ate it. Desiring revenge, Tu-te-kohi raised a force together with Māhaki, whose wife had slept with another one of Rakaipaaka's followers, and the twins Rongomai-mihiao and Rongomai-wehea of Uawa (Tolaga Bay). Rongomai-mihiao and Rongomai-wehea attacked Waerengaahika and drew Rakaipaaka into a pursuit. When they reached Kaitaratahi ridge, Tu-te-kohi and Mahaki ambushed Rakaipaaka and his men from behind. Surrounded, they took heavy losses, but some of them escaped back to Waerengaahika. Tu-te-kohi then attacked Waerengaahika, defeated them again and drove them to Taumata-o-te-kai, at which point Mahaki brokered a peace agreement for his cousin. Under the terms of this agreement Rakaipaaka had to go into exile.

Hinemanuhiri and her family travelled southwest and settled at Te Mania in Marumaru (north of Wairoa). Rakaipaaka went directly south to the Mahia Peninsula, the homeland of his grandmother Rongomaiwahine. From there, he went west to Nūhaka, and then up the Nūhaka River to mount Moumoukai, where he settled. This remains the rohe of Ngāti Rakaipaaka to this day.

=== Conflict with Ngāi Tauira ===
Places in the conflict with Ngāi Tauira
1 Te Poti
2 Waharera
3 Waiau River
4 Taupara flats

Rakaipaaka's nephew Tama-te-rangi decided to go to war with his neighbours Ngāi Tauira because of an insult that his son had received from their rangatira, Mutu, and he sent his sons Rakai-hakeke and Tama-te-hua to Rakaipaaka with a calabash of huahua (cooked birds, preserved in their own fat) to seek his assistance. Rakaipaaka accepted the calabash, symbolising his agreement to help, and gave part of it to his son Kaukohea and his follower Kahutauranga, symbolising his request for them to come as well. His war party met up with that of Tama-te-rangi at Te Poti (near Wairoa), where they held a hui (discussion), until Rakaipaaka's teenage son, Urewera, shouted "Are we here for the black or the red?!" (to talk like a black tūī bird or to fight like red warriors), which became a proverbial saying. Rakaipaaka gave Urewera his patu (club) and the forces set out.

The force went up the east side of the Wairoa River, forded it at Waharera, came down the west side of the river and were crossing the Waiau River when Ngāi Tauira attacked. They defeated Ngāi Tauira and chased them to Kokopu, where Kaukohea and Kahutauranga joined them. The combined force continued to pursue Ngāi Tauira, finally defeating them on the Taupara flats at Awamate, near Aranui. In total, Ngāi Tauira lost 4,000 men in the attack and they were nearly wiped out.

Tama-te-rangi now led a war party against Tu-te-kohi to get revenge for his earlier conflict with Rakai-paaka, and was successful, but was himself killed in revenge for this attack shortly thereafter.

== Family ==
Rakaipaaka married Tu-rumakina, who had the same name as his half-sister, but was a descendant of Kahungunu through another line, and had ten children:

- Rakairaumoa
- Kaukohea, who married Mawate:

- Tutekanao, who married Tamateahirau, a descendant of Rākei-hikuroa:

- Tureia, who married Hinekimihanga, a descendant of Kahungunu:

- Te Huki

- Kaunohanga
- Kurahikakawa, ancestor of Ngāti Kura
- Mamangu

- Whakapirikura
- Mataiauahi
- Pokia
- Urewera
- Mahakipare
- Marotauia
- Puke
- Rawaru

== Commemoration ==
The bridge over the Nuhaka River on State Highway 2 is named Rakaipaka Bridge, in honour of Rakaipaaka.

== Bibliography ==
- Mitchell, J. H. (2014). Takitimu: A History of Ngati Kahungunu. Libro International. ISBN 978-1-877514-72-2.
- Parsons, Patrick (1997). WAI 400: The Ahuriri Block: Maori Customary Interests (PDF).
