= Ahimanawa Range =

Hill range in New Zealand

- Location within New Zealand

Highest point
- Peak: Tunurangi
- Elevation: 1,251 m (4,104 ft)
- Coordinates: 39.06°S 176.517°E

Geography
- Country: New Zealand

The Ahimanawa Range is a range of rugged hills in the northern Hawke's Bay region of the eastern North Island of New Zealand. It is located between Napier and Taupō.
