= Aropaoanui River =

River in Hawke's Bay Region, New Zealand

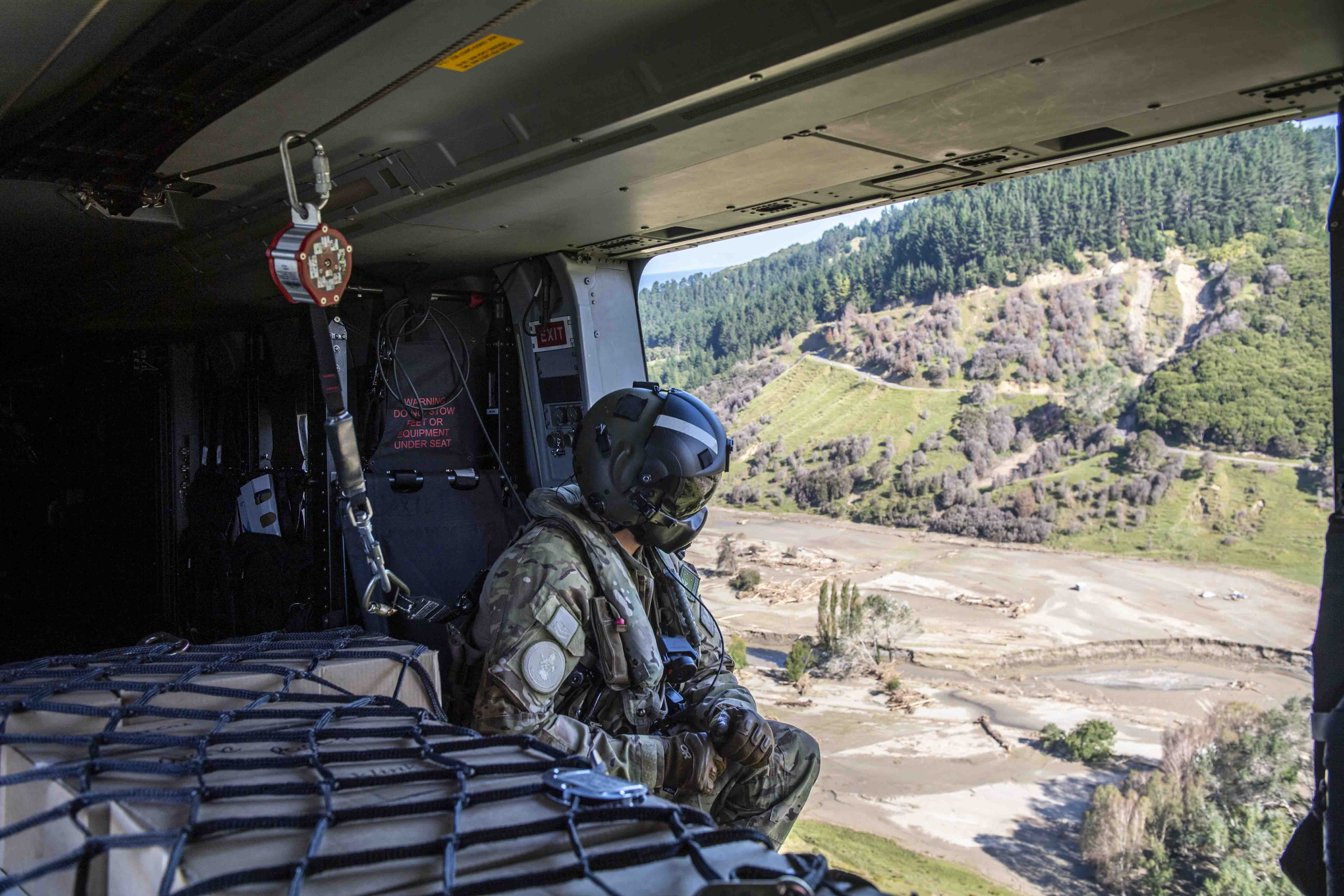
- RNZAF NH90 transporting supplies to a remote Aropaoanui community
- Route of the Aropaoanui River
- Mouth of the Aropaoanui River Aropaoanui River (North Island)
- Native name: Aropaoanui, Arapawanui (Māori)

Location
- Country: New Zealand
- Island: North Island
- Region: Hawke's Bay
- District: Hastings

Physical characteristics
- Source: Confluence of the Waikōau River and Mairau Stream
  - location: Tangoio Forest
  - coordinates: 39.26407°S 176.90402°E
- Mouth: Hawke Bay
  - coordinates: 39°16′42″S 176°59′56″E

Basin features
- Progression: Aropaoanui River → Hawke Bay → Pacific Ocean

The Aropaoanui River, also known as the Arapawanui River, runs through northern Hawke's Bay Region in the eastern North Island of New Zealand.

== Etymology ==
The Māori name Aropaoanui comes from a site within the Aropaoanui Valley, and can be translated as "thoroughly bashed kidneys", referring to a historical story prior to the migration of Taraia of Ngāti Kahungunu to the area, in which a chief noticing that a slain enemy's paoa (kidneys) were moving, attacked them, worried that this may have been caused by witchcraft. The river is also known as Arapawanui by Maungaharuru Tangitū, literally meaning the "way of the big canyon".

== Geography ==
The river forms at the confluence of the Waikōau River and Mairau Stream, and the river system ultimately rises from streams on the Maungaharuru Range. The river flows through a steep-sided valley past the Tangoio Forest, reaching its narrow floodplain just 3 kilometres (1.9 mi) from the coast. Some small farms dot the upper part of the floodplain, accessed by a metal road which meets the Napier–Wairoa highway. The river empties into Hawke Bay, the waters joining the Pacific Ocean, just north of the small settlements of Tangoio and Waipātiki Beach, some 25 kilometres (16 mi) north of Napier.

== Ecology ==
The Aropaoanui has been described as one of the cleanest rivers in New Zealand by the Department of Conservation (only phosphorus levels are in the category of worst 25% of rivers and the river has longfin and shortfin eels, koura, inanga, torrent fish, blue gill bully, common bully, redfin bully, banded kōkopu and pātiki), and is fished for many species including trout and whitebait.

== History ==
The river has traditional significance for Maungaharuru Tangitū-associated hapū of Ngāti Kahungunu, with major kāinga (villages) of Maungaharuru Tangitū being found here, and the river mouth being an important fishery and gathering area for seafood. The river is mentioned in stories of the migratory waka Tākitimu, as a place where the tohunga Ruawharo placed the body of his son, after he had been turned to stone. The northern ridge above the river was the location of a traditional trail between the Aropaoanui settlements and those at Lake Tūtira.

Floods in 1938 swept away the bridge on the Napier-Wairoa section of State Highway 2. The area around the river was also badly affected by floods in 2022.

== See also ==
- List of rivers of New Zealand
