= Tamatea Arikinui =

Māori chieftain

Tamatea Arikinui or Tamatea Mai-Tawhiti was a Māori ariki (chieftain), who captained the Tākitimu canoe on its journey from Hawaiki to New Zealand, where he settled at Tauranga and became the ancestor of the Ngāti Kahungunu iwi. J. H. Mitchell places Tamatea in the mid-fourteenth century. In Ngāti Kahungunu tradition, he is distinguished from his grandson Tamatea Urehaea who undertook extensive explorations of New Zealand. Northland and Tauranga traditions say that they were the same person.

== Life ==
Tamatea's journey, according to J. H. Mitchell
1 Awanui
2 North Cape
3 Te Manga-Tawa, Tauranga

Tamatea was born and raised in Hawaiki, the legendary homeland of the Māori before they came to New Zealand. J. H. Mitchell's history of Ngāti Kahungunu provides no information on his ancestry or early life. In Hawaiki, Tamatea became an Arikinui ("great chieftain"), who led the tribes of Ngāti Hukumoana, Ngāti Hakuturi, and Ngāti Tutakahinahina, which lived in the villages of Whāngārā, Pakarae, and Rehuroa.

=== Journey to New Zealand ===
When the explorer Hoaki returned to Hawaiki with the news that New Zealand was sparsely populated, Tamatea was inspired to build a canoe, the Tākitimu, and lead a migration to New Zealand. It was first roughly shaped at Titirangi hill and then taken to Tamatea's house at Whāngārā, where the carving was completed in an extremely sacred enclosure which was off limits to women and commoners. Tamatea and the tohunga Ruawharo consecrated the Tākitimu by singing a karakia which J. H. Mitchell records and pouring a calabash of water over the bow. Then they launched the canoe into the Pikopiki-i-whiti lagoon. After this, it was taken in the night to Te-whetu-Matarau and the tohunga Ruawharo cast various protective spells for the boat, one of which J. H. Mitchell records.

The Tākitimu was too sacred for women, commoners, children, or cooked food to be allowed onto it. Tamatea Arikinui took up the role of captain, sitting at the stern and holding the ceremonial paddles Rapanga-i-te-atinuku and Rapanga-i-te-ati-rangi. The ship travelled to Rarotonga and from there made the journey from Rarotonga to New Zealand in only eleven days. A shortage of food forced the crew to pray to Tangaroa and Tāne, who provided them with raw fish and birds to eat.

The Tākitimu arrived at Awanui at the base of the Aupōuri Peninsula in Northland. Some members of the crew settled in this location, but Tamatea led most of the crew continued around North Cape, and along the east coast of the North Island until they reached Tauranga. Here Tamatea left the Tākitimu, entrusting the command to Tahu, whom he instructed to find a source of pounamu or greenstone (nephrite jade).

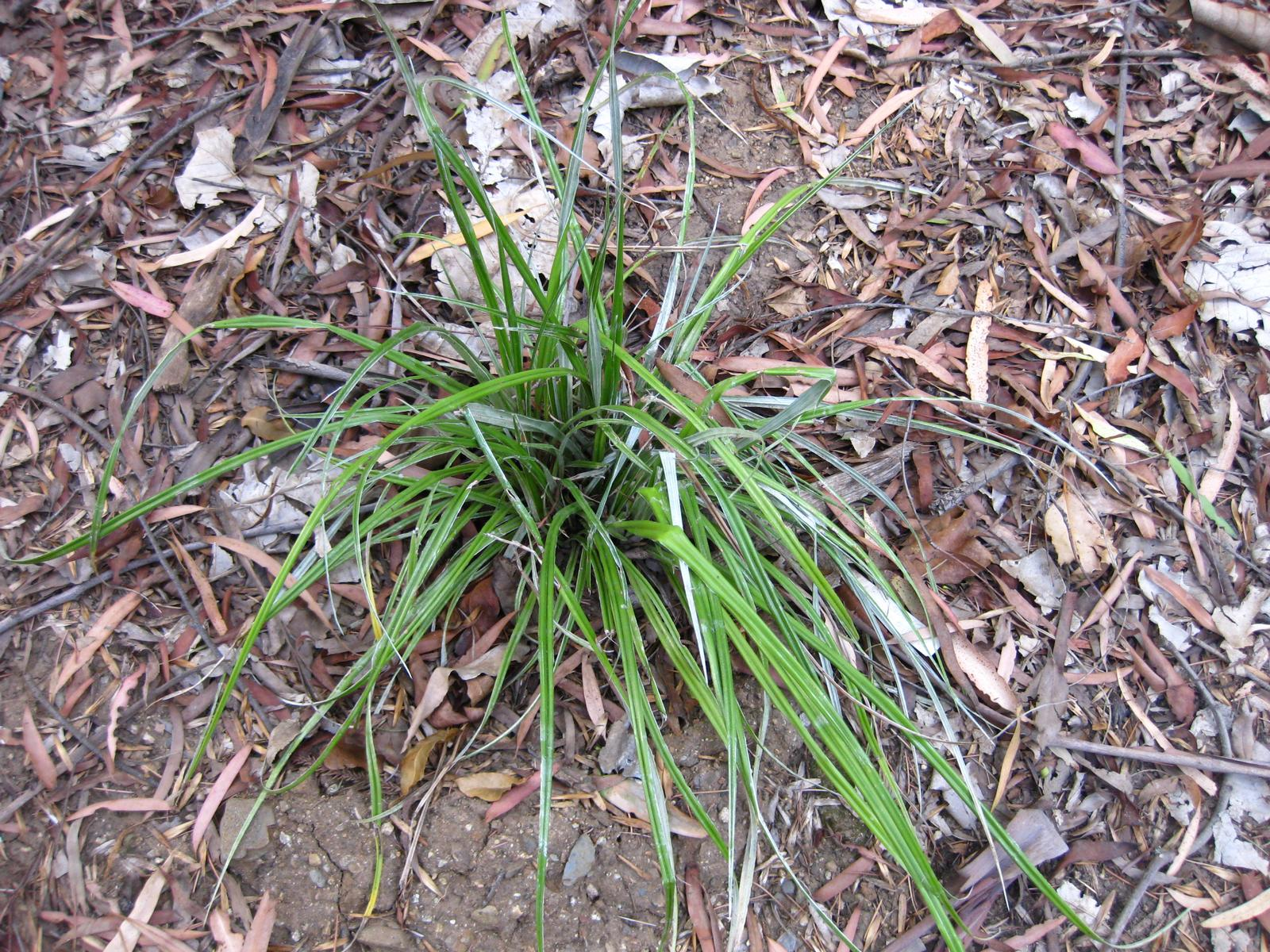
A wharawhara plant

Tamatea settled at Kawhai-nui, now Tauranga. Here he planted a sacred flax plant called Wharawhara-nui, built a pa called Te Manga-Tawa, and married a local lady. The local people gave him the name Tamatea mai-tawhiti ("Tamatea from a distance") and honoured him. J. H. Mitchell thinks that he found himself "aimless" and without opportunities for further deeds. He died shortly after the birth of his son.

== Family ==
Tamatea married Toto, a descendant of Toi-te-huatahi. They had a son, Rongokako, father of Tamatea Urehaea, father of Kahungunu, the eponymous ancestor of Ngāti Kahungunu, and a daughter, Rongorongo, who married Turi, captain of the Aotea.

== Bibliography ==
- Mitchell, J. H. (2014). Takitimu: A History of Ngati Kahungunu. Libro International. ISBN 978-1-877514-72-2.
- Steedman, J. A. W. (1984). Ngā Ohaaki o ngā Whānau o Tauranga Moana: Māori History and Genealogy of the Bay of Plenty.
- Taonui, Rāwiri (2005). "Canoe traditions". Te Ara - the Encyclopedia of New Zealand.
