= Te Huhuti =

Places in the life of Te Huhuti
1 Oueroa
2 Parehemanihi
3 Lake Rotoatara

Te Huhuti was a Māori chieftainess of Ngāti Kahungunu from the Hawke’s Bay region of New Zealand and an ancestor of the Ngāti Te Whatuiāpiti hapū. She probably lived in the late 17th century.

Te Huhuti’s family, Te Hika a Ruarauhanga, was locked in a multi-generational feud with her cousins Te Hika a Pāpāuma. However, Te Huhuti fell in love with Te Whatuiāpiti the leading rangatira of Te Hika a Pāpāuma, snuck away from her home, and swam across Lake Rotoatara in order to marry him. This brought the feud between the two lines to an end and is considered to be one of the great traditional Māori love stories.

== Life ==
Te Huhuti was the daughter of Te Rangitaumaha and Hineiao. Through both her parents, she was a descendant of Rākei-hikuroa by his wife Ruarauhanga; Kahungunu; Tamatea, the captain of the Tākitimu canoe; and the early explorer Toi. She had three sisters – Ruatiti, Manuitiatoi, and Parengenge – and four brothers – Taraia, Hinehore, Hikateko, and Kaiaotea. After Rākei-hikuroa's death, an enduring feud developed between the descendants of Ruarauhanga (Te Hika a Ruarauhanga) and the descendants of one of his other wives, Pāpāuma (Te Hika a Pāpāuma).

=== Te Whatuiāpiti’s attack ===
Te Huhuti’s father, Te Rangitaumaha split his time between Oueroa and Parehemanihi, near Ōmahu. He took a number of members of Te Hika a Pāpāuma prisoner at Parehemanihi and planned to eat them. In revenge, Te Whatuiāpiti, the leading rangatira of Te Hika a Pāpāuma attacked Parehemanihi and fought with great prowess. Te Huhuti was watching the battle from the ramparts and was instantly taken with him. When Te Whatuiāpiti caught sight of her, he was struck by her beauty in turn, so he immediately ended the battle and made peace, even though he had been on the verge of victory. He was invited into the village for dinner and there he secretly slept with Te Huhuti and told her to come to him at Rotoatara.

=== Te Huhuti’s journey ===
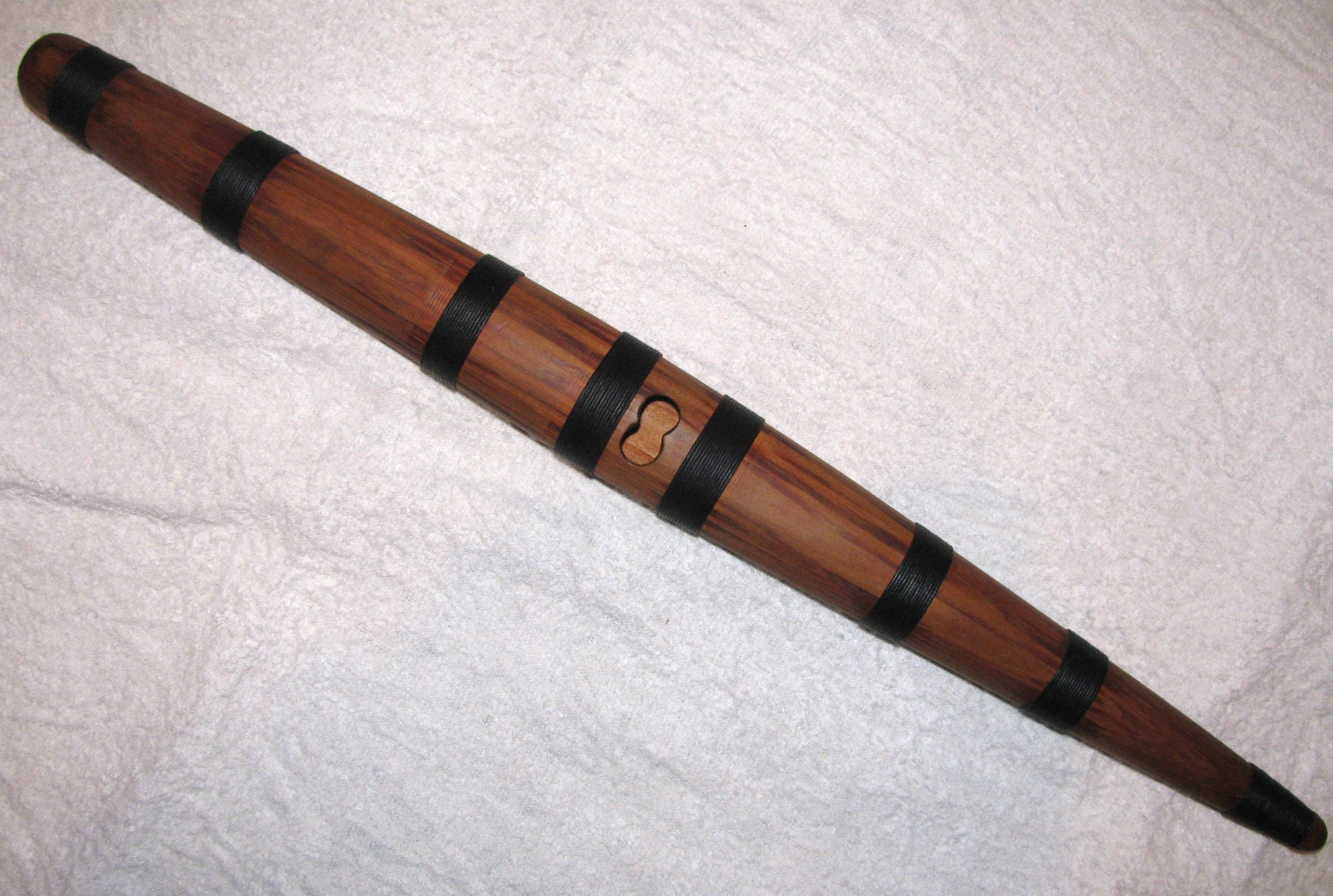
A pūtōrino flute.

There are a number of accounts of Te Huhuti’s journey to Lake Rotoatara. All accounts agree that Te Huhuti arrived at the lake late in the evening and found that there was no way to get to the island where Te Whatuiāpiti’s village was located, that Te Huhuti therefore swam naked across the lake, and managed to rendezvous with Te Whatuiāpiti, but they differ on the details.

According to one account, Te Huhuti swam across to the island, where she hid in the rushes hoping for Te Whatuiāpiti to come down to the shore. When one of Te Whatuiāpiti’s slaves came down to get water, she smashed his calabash. He fetched another and she smashed that too, so the slave told Te Whatuiāpiti, who realised that the mysterious woman was Te Huhuti. He brought her into his house and the two were married. In the morning, Te Whatuiāpiti announced the marriage by climbing up on top of his house and shouting out “Who was able to overcome Rotoatara but Te Huhuti?”

In another version, Huhuti swam across the lake in the dark, guided by a love song played by Te Whatuiāpiti on his pūtōrino flute, called Te Aometikirangi, and she then went straight to his house.

Most versions of the story say that Te Whatuiāpiti’s mother, Hinetemoa, found out about the wedding the morning after and was furious, because her relatives had been killed by Te Rangitaumaha. In one version, she came running into the house after hearing the news, waving a pounamu axe, intending to murder Te Huhuti. In the oldest published version of the story, however, Te Huhuti meets Hinetemoa at the shore and persuades her to take her to Te Whatuiāpiti.

All versions agree the Hinetemoa said, “Sitting there like a statue (teko)! Sitting there naked/like an idiot/like an eel changing its skin (hore)! I have a mind to strike you down (taraitia) with my greenstone axe!” But then she said, “My anger is over. I am very sad and in pain of heart over this marriage. But now we will make peace.” The marriage ended the feud between Te Hika a Pāpāuma and Te Hika a Ruarauhanga.

The story is considered one of the great Māori romances and has been compared to the more famous tale of Hinemoa and Tūtānekai. It is commemorated by a traditional song of Ngāti Te Whatuiāpiti, which is recorded by John Te Herekiekie Grace:

E noho e tama i roto i to pa i Te Rotoatara,
Hangaia to whare ko Pakewairangi.
E piki e tama ki runga ki to pa,
Whakatangi ai i to pu
Ko Te Aometikirangi ra te pūtōrino e tama,
Ka puta ai koe ki te whaiao ki te aomarama!

— Grace 1959, p. 285
Translation:

Remain, sir, in your fort at Te Rotoatara
And build the house Pakewairangi.
Ascend, sir, to the watchtower of the fort
And play your love song again.
Te Aometikirangi is your flute, sir,
It will lead you into the world of light!

=== Te Rangitaumaha’s gift ===
When Te Huhuti gave birth to her first child, her father Te Rangitaumaha came to Rotoatara in order to perform the tohi baptismal ritual and named the child Wawahanga. He brought a gift of shellfish and eels from Lake Oingo and Lake Runanga, but Te Huhuti was dismayed at the small size of the gift, so Te Rangitaumaha gifted Te Huhuti her “elders and brothers” as servants of Wawahanga. Sources differ as to whether this meant her elder brothers, Hinehore, Hikateko, and Taraia (the Ngāti Hineiao hapū) or the Ngāpuhi, Ngāti Ngāwera, Ngāti Te Ao hapū. Different sources strongly disagree about whether Te Rangitaumaha also gifted large areas of land in the Heretaunga region to Wawahanga. These questions were material to a hearing of the Māori Land Court on claims to the region around Ōmahu in 1889.

== Family ==
Te Huhuti had three sons and a daughter with Te Whatuiāpiti:

- Te Wawahanga, who married Te Aopatuwhare, but became sick and died while she was pregnant:

- Te Rangikawhiua

- Te Hikawera
- Mihikitekapua (daughter)
- Keke

== Sources ==
The story of Te Huhuti’s journey was first recorded in George Grey’s Polynesian Mythology of 1854. H. J. Fletcher published another version in 1926, which he received from Hoeta Te Hata of Ngāti Tūwharetoa, a descendant of Te Whatuiāpiti and Te Huhuti. A similar version is given by John Te Herekiekie Grace. Ngāti Kahungunu traditions are briefly summarised by Patrick Parsons in a 1997 report to the Waitangi Tribunal on Māori traditional claims to the Ahuriri area. Parsons also reports the story about Wawahanga’s baptism, drawing on nineteenth century testimony delivered before the Māori Land Court.

== Bibliography ==
- Grey, George (1854). Polynesia Mythology & Ancient Traditional History of the New Zealanders.
- Te Hata, Hoeta; Fletcher, H. J. (1926). "The Story of Te Huhuti of Te Roto-a-tara". Journal of the Polynesian Society. 35: 31–35.
- Grace, John Te Herekiekie (1959). Tuwharetoa: The history of the Maori people of the Taupo District. Auckland [N.Z.]: A.H. & A.W. Reed.
- Parsons, Patrick (1997). WAI 400: The Ahuriri Block: Maori Cusomary Interests (PDF).
