= Tamatea Urehaea =

15th century Māori explorer

Tamatea's circumnavigation of New Zealand
1 Whangaroa and Tauranga Bay
2 Te Whanganui-a-Tara
3 Murihiku
4 Te Waewae Bay
5 Kaiapoi
6 Cape Farewell
7 Whanganui
8 Port Waikato
9 Kaipara Harbour
10 Hokianga
11 Kaitaia
12 Mangatawa
13 Tapu-te-ranga island
14 Pohokura
15 Moawhango River
16 Huka Falls

Tamatea Urehaea (also known as Tamatea Pōkai-whenua and Tamatea Pōkai-moana) was a Māori ariki (chieftain) of the Tākitimu tribal confederation and ancestor of the Ngāti Kahungunu iwi (tribe), who probably lived in the fifteenth century. He is famous as an explorer who circumnavigated both islands of New Zealand. After he was expelled from his base at Kaitaia, he settled in Hawke's Bay, but continued to explore the North Island.

In Ngāti Kahungunu tradition, he is distinguished from his grandfather Tamatea Arikinui who captained the Tākitimu canoe on its journey from Hawaiki to New Zealand. Northland and Tauranga traditions say that they were the same person.

== Life ==
Tamatea's father was Rongokako, himself the son of Tamatea Arikinui who captained the Tākitimu canoe on its journey from Hawaiki to New Zealand. His mother was Muriwhenua. In some versions, he is said to have been born in Hawaiki. He received his second name, Urehaea ("cut penis"), because he was circumcised.

=== Circumnavigation of New Zealand ===
When Tamatea came of age, he engaged the craftsman Kauri to build a canoe for him at Whangaroa, which he named Tākitimu after his grandfather's vessel. He gathered a crew of seventy men and set off to circumnavigate New Zealand. For most of this circumnavigation, Tamatea alternated between paddling in the canoe and walking on the shore, while his companions sailed the canoe. He set out from Tauranga Bay, just east of Whangaroa. From there, he travelled down the east coast to Te Whanganui a Tara (Wellington Harbour), where he crossed Raukawa (Cook Strait) and travelled down the east coast of the South Island until he reached Murihiku, turned west, and travelled up the west coast to Cape Farewell. From there he sailed straight across the sea to Whanganui. Then he travelled north past Port Waikato. According to Northland traditions, he explored Kaipara and Hokianga harbours. Travelling around North Cape, he returned to Tauranga Bay. For these feats, he received the name Pōkai-moana ("explorer of the seas"). Henry Matthew Stowell (Hare Hongi) calls him "the most famous navigator of purely Maori history" after Tamarereti.

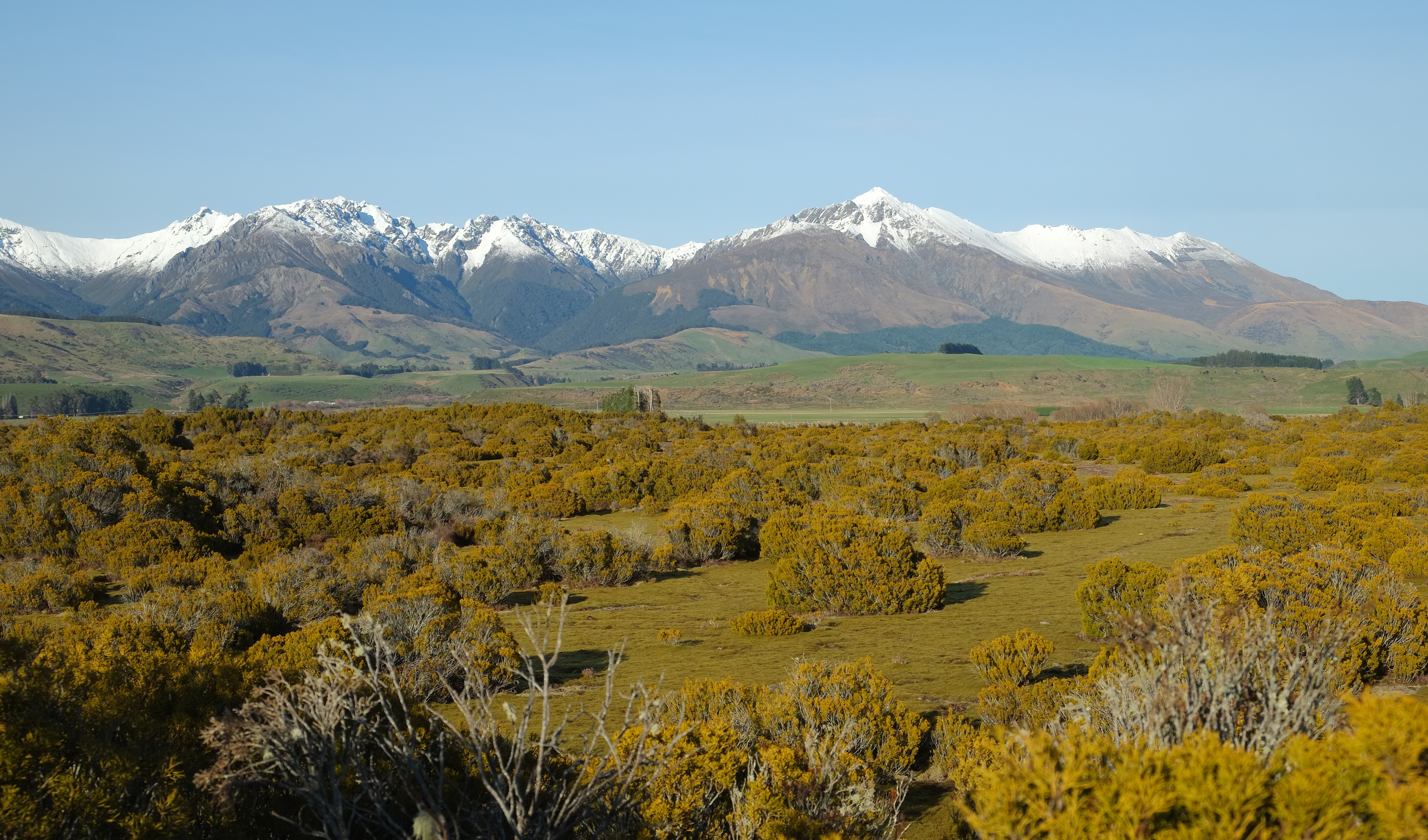
Takitimu Mountains from north (Wilderness Scientific Reserve)

In a South Island Māori account, Tamatea was shipwrecked at Te Waewae Bay as he rounded Murihiku and his canoe became the Takitimu Mountains. He then walked north to Kaiapoi, where he called out to Mount Tongariro for help. A vast fire came down from the mountain along the Whanganui River and over the Cook Strait, boiling away the water, so that Tamatea could walk all the way back to the central North Island. Tamatea took the fire with him and left it at various locations along the east coast of the South Island. In another version, he built a new canoe and sailed to Whanganui in it.

=== Expulsion from the North ===
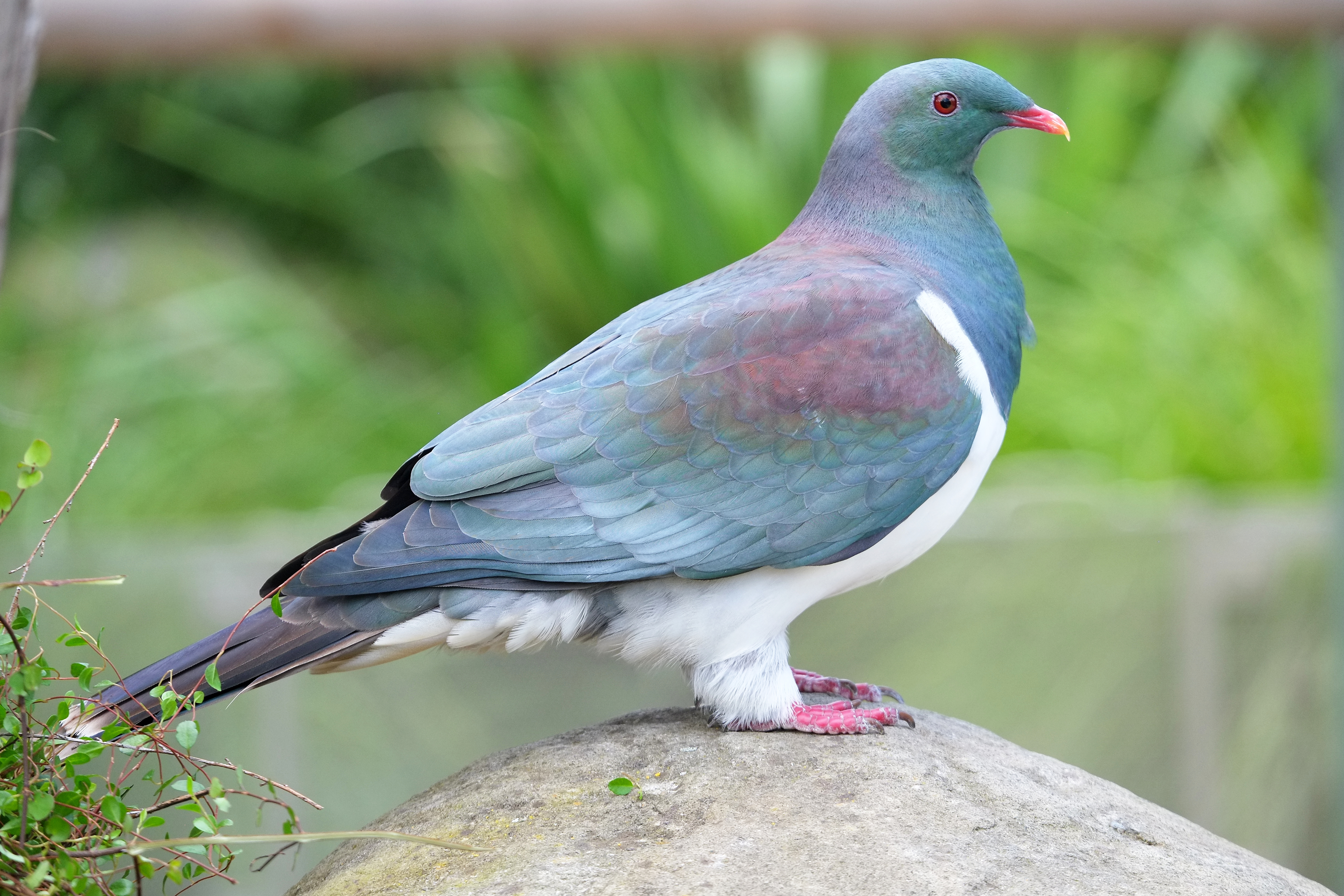
Kererū standing on a rock.

After the circumnavigation, Tamatea went to the nearby Rangaunu Harbour and married the three daughters of Ira and Tekeru-wahine: Te Onoono-i-waho, Iwipupu, and Te Moana-i-kauia. Tamatea established a settlement called Tinotino at Ōrongotea, where he and his men hunted kererū in such great numbers that the location was renamed Kaitaia, which means "food in abundance." When his son Kahungunu was born, he buried the child's umbilical cord nearby with three whatu-kura (sacred stones), so that it would be an iho-whenua, a link which would bind the land to him. These actions angered the local people, who banded together under Ruakerepeti to drive him out of the region. They built fortresses at Whangape, Rangaunu, Herekino, Ahipara, Hukatere, and Rangiaohia, hemming Tamatea in. Tamatea responded by digging a great trench, intended either to flood the Kaitaia area with seawater or with water from the Kaitaia stream, thereby making the land useless to anyone. However, the tools kept breaking and he had to give up the task. Traces of his efforts were still pointed out as of 1944. Two traditional sayings are associated with this canal: Māori: E Kauri E! Kua whati nga toki! ("Oh Kauri! These adzes are broken!") and Māori: Waiho ra kia whati ana, e whati ana ki mahi rau a tama a Tawake ("Let them break. They are broken in the many tasks of the son of Tawake.").

=== Migration to the East Coast and inland exploration ===
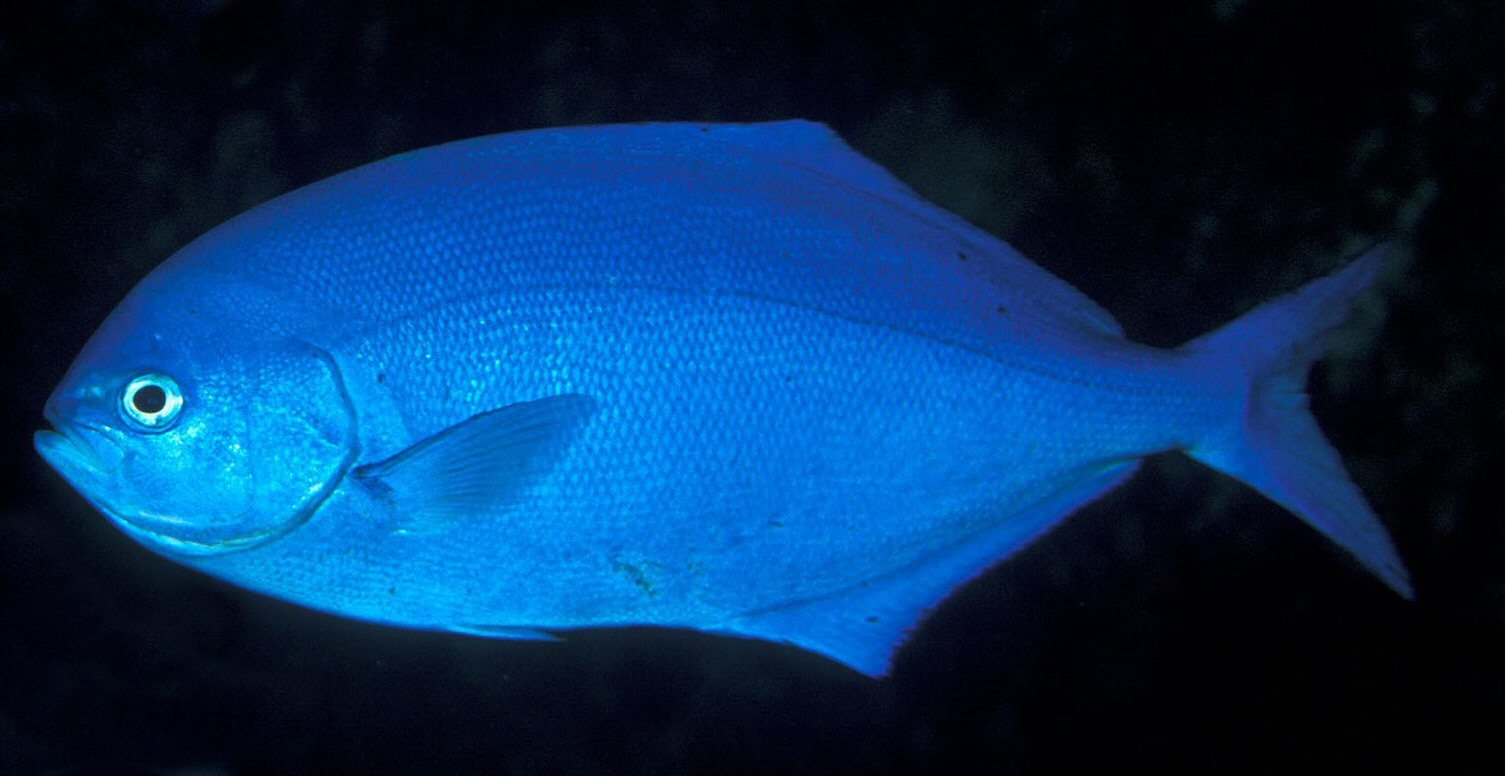
Maomao fish.

Departing from Kaitaia, Tamatea travelled to Te Aurere in Mangōnui harbour. The local people exhorted him to settle there, but he refused, saying Māori: He rangai maomao ka taka ki tua o Nukutaurua e kore a muri e hokia ("a shoal of maomao fish that passes beyond Nukutaurua never returns"), which has become proverbial. Nukutauria is a rock at the mouth of Mangōnui harbour. Instead, he settled at his grandfather's old settlement of Maungatawa at Kawhai-nui. Eventually, he departed, leaving the settlement to his son Ranginui.

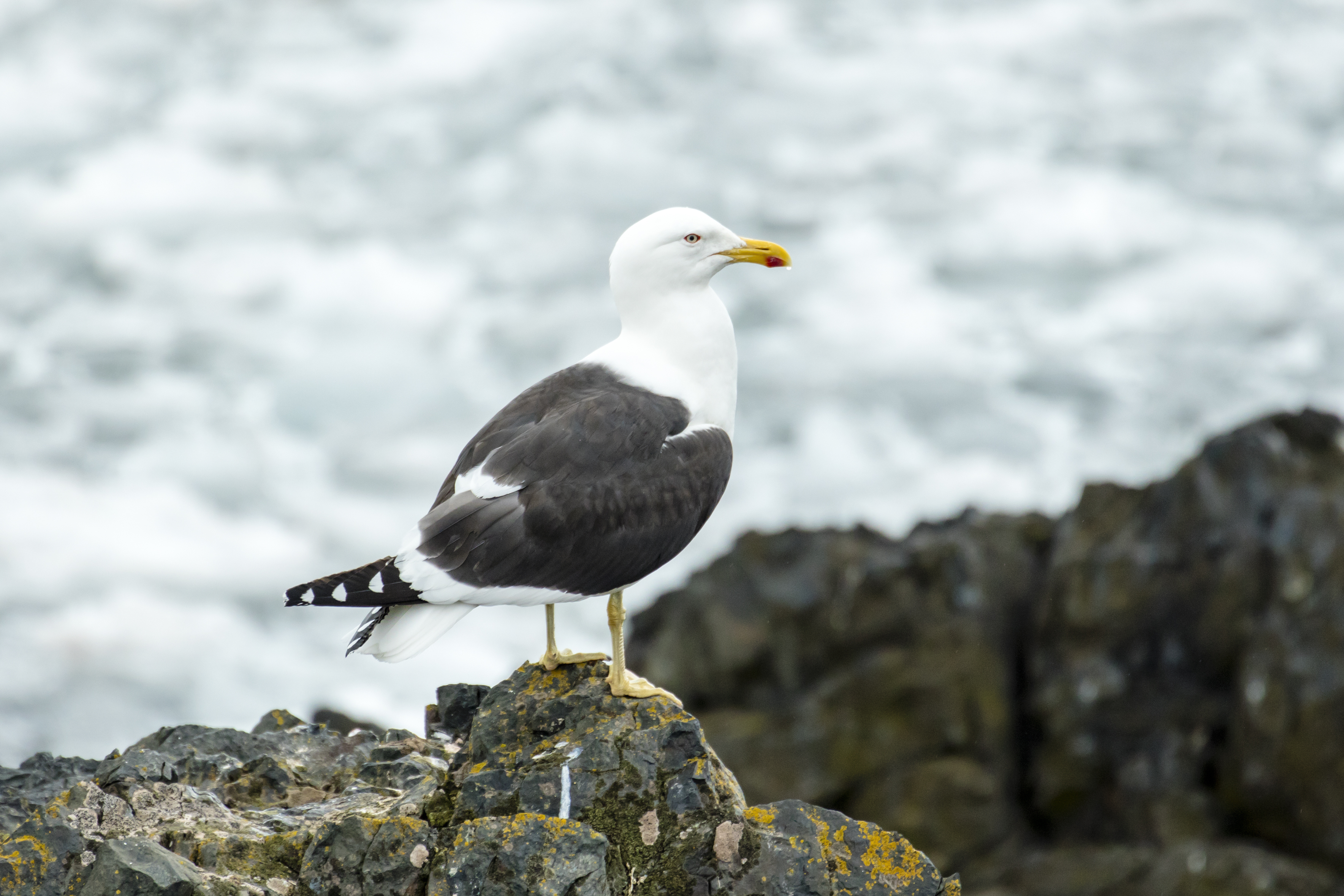
Karoro (kelp gull).

From here, he travelled to Ōpōtiki. He remained there until he heard that his son Kahungunu had married Rongomai-wāhine at Māhia Peninsula and that she was pregnant. He gathered presents and set out to bless the newborn. He travelled up the Waioeka River, where his pet karoro (kelp gull) turned to stone. The stone bird remained a local landmark as of 1944. When Tamatea came to Moumoukai, a village near Mōrere, he received the news that Rongomai-wāhine had given birth to a girl, who was the child of her previous husband, not Kahungunu. Tamatea threw the presents away in anger and went to Tapu-te-ranga island in Whanganui-a-rotu lagoon (now Napier). The girl was named Hine-Rauiri ("castaway girl") as a result.

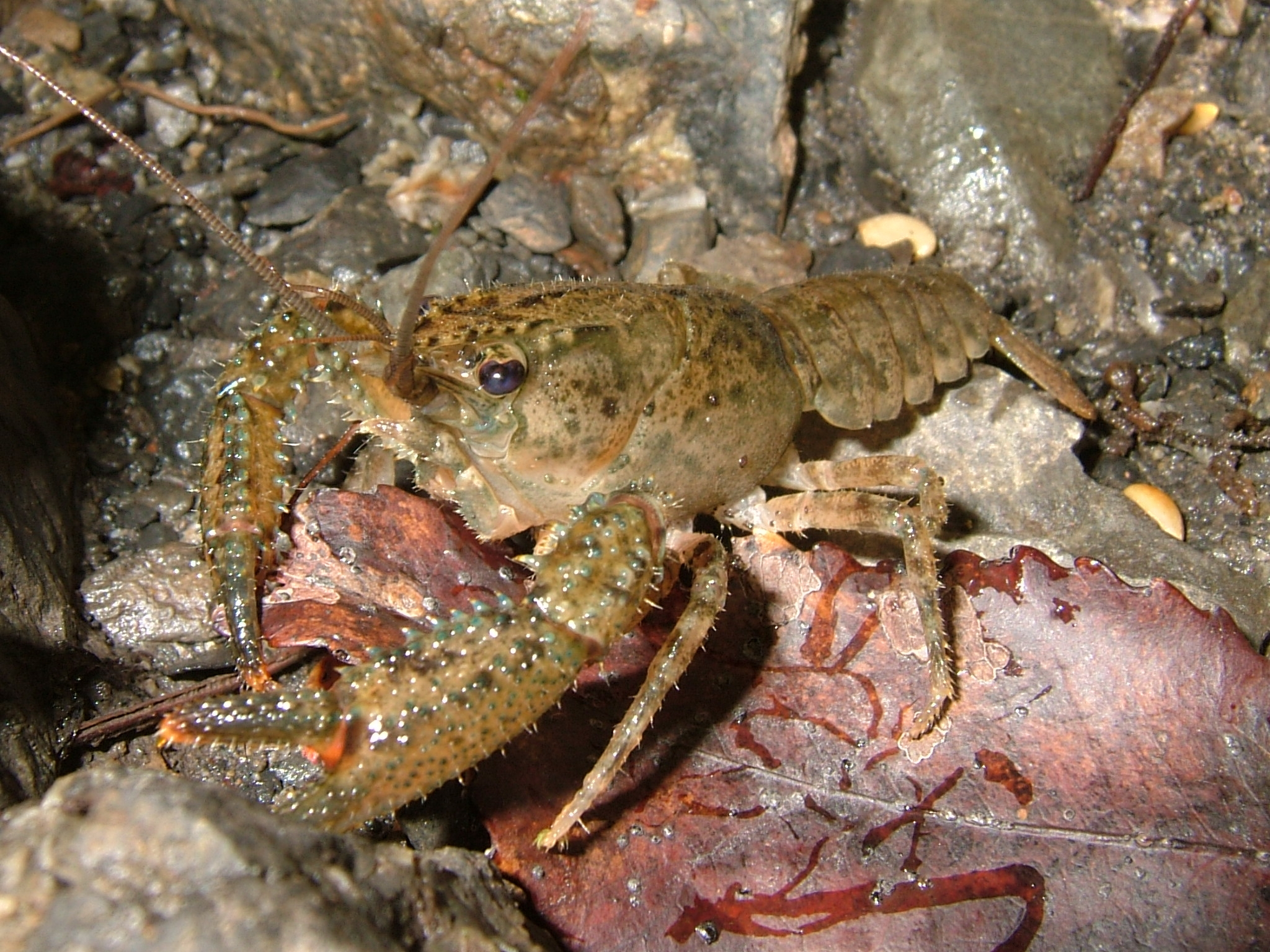
Kōura (freshwater crayfish)

Exploring inland, he identified the route through the Ahimanawa and Huiarau Ranges, going up the Otamatea River, which was named after him. Travelling up the Mangakopikopiko River, he nearly starved at Pohokura in the Ruahine Range, but continued all the way overland to Lake Taupō. On another trip, he went up the Ngaruroro River over the Ruahine Range to Waiouru and Taihape. When he reached the Moawhango River, he filled it with kōura (freshwater crayfish). For this second journey, he received the name Pōkai-whenua ("explorer of the land").

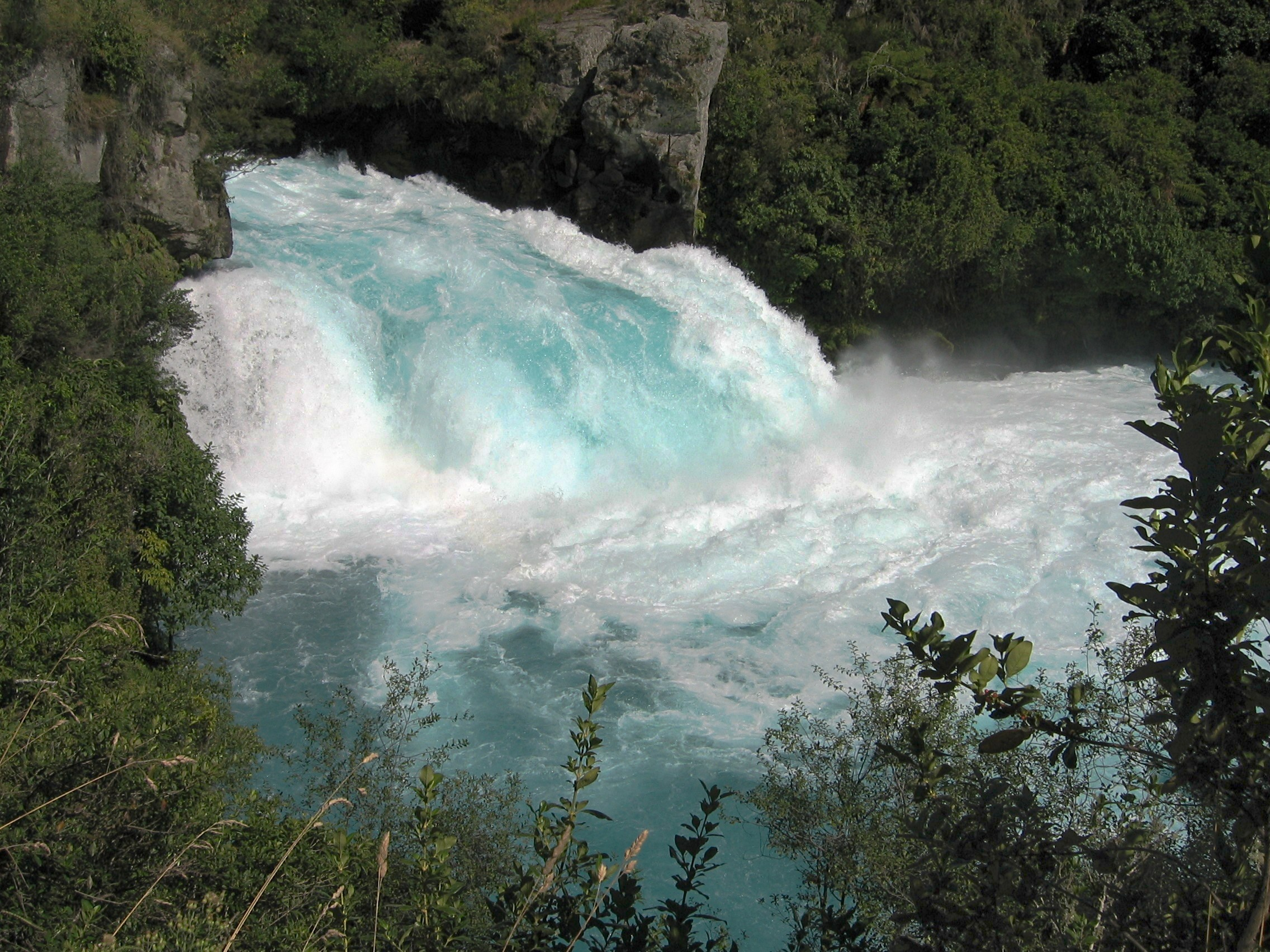
Huka Falls.

From Moawhango, Tamatea set out on a final exploratory journey through the North Island, heading up the Whanganui River and then going overland to Lake Taupō. The Tama Lakes between the Volcanic Plateau and Lake Taupō were named after him Nga Puna a Tamatea ("The Water-springs of Tamatea"). From Taupō he sailed into the Waikato River and was killed by the rough water at Huka Falls or the Aratiatia Rapids. Another version says that he survived going over the falls and walked back to Tauranga.

=== Family ===
Tamatea married three daughters of Ira and Tekerau-wahine, a descendant of Paikea, at Rangaunu and had children with all of them.

By Te Onoono-i-waho, he had one son:

- Te Whaene:

- Rongoiri

- Ruariki

- Pou-wharekura, who married her elderly great grand-uncle Kahungunu.

By Iwipupu, he had one son:

- Kahungunu, ancestor of Ngāti Kahungunu.
- Iranui, ancestor of Te Whānau-ā-Apanui and Te Aitanga-a-Hauiti.

By Te Moana-i-kauia, he had a daughter and a son:

- Haumanga, who married Tunanui Haruatai and settled with him at Ōpōtiki, where she had two sons:,

- Tūtāmure, by her husband
- Tamataipūnoa, by a slave of her husband, Ahukawa. He married Tauhei-kurī, daughter of Kahungunu, and had two sons:

- Tawhiwhi, who married Te Ahiwhakamauroa and died young.

- Hine-pua, who married Tama-konohi:

- Karakia-rau:

- Hikairo, ancestor of Ngāti Hikairo.

- Māhaki, ancestor of Te Aitanga-a-Māhaki.

- Ranginui, ancestor of Ngāti Ranginui.

In addition, he was the father of:

- Tamakopiri, ancestor of Ngāti Tama of Ngāti Tūwharetoa.
- Te-Papa-whaka-iri, father of Moe-puia, father of Whana-a-rangi, father of Apakura, who married Whatihua of Tainui and became the ancestor of Ngāti Apakura.

=== Sources ===
The story of Tamatea is recounted by J. H. Mitchell in Takitimu. He draws the story of the initial circumnavigation from Henry Matthew Stowell (Hare Hongi) of Ngāpuhi. The account of Tamatea's death on the upper Waikato River is given by Thomas Lambert.

== Commemoration ==
Among the numerous places named after Tamatea are the Otamatea River, the Tama Lakes, the Napier suburb of Tamatea, and Taumatawhakatangihangakoauauotamateaturipukakapikimaungahoronukupokaiwhenuakitanatahu, one of the candidates for the longest place name in the world, which recalls an occasion when he played the flute for his lover.

Tamatea is recalled in a number of structures around New Zealand. The meeting house of Ngāti Kahungunu ki Wairarapa at Pouākani Marae in Mangakino is called Tamatea Pokai Whenua after him. The meeting house of the Ngāti Ranginui hapū of Ngāi Tamarawaho at Huria Marae in Judea is also called Tamatea Pokaiwhenua.

== Bibliography ==
- Cowan, James (1935). Hero Stories of New Zealand. Harry H. Tombs.
- Foster, Bernard John (1966). "Tamatea-Pokai-Whenua". An Encyclopaedia of New Zealand.
- Grace, John Te Herekiekie (1959). Tuwharetoa: The history of the Maori people of the Taupo District. Auckland [N.Z.]: A.H. & A.W. Reed.
- Jones, Pei Te Hurinui; Biggs, Bruce (2004). Ngā iwi o Tainui: nga koorero tuku iho a nga tuupuna = The traditional history of the Tainui people. Auckland [N.Z.]: Auckland University Press. ISBN 1-86940-331-2.
- Lambert, Thomas (1925). The story of old Wairoa and the East Coast district, North Island, New Zealand, or, Past, present, and future: a record of over fifty years progress. Dunedin: Coulls Somerville Wilkie.
- Mitchell, J. H. (2014). Takitimu: A History of Ngati Kahungunu. Libro International. ISBN 978-1-877514-72-2.
- Taonui, Rāwiri (2005). "Canoe traditions". Te Ara - the Encyclopedia of New Zealand.
- Taonui, Rāwiri (2007). "'Ngā waewae tapu – Māori exploration - The East Coast". Te Ara - the Encyclopedia of New Zealand.
