= Pourangahua =

New Zealand Māori chief (rangatira)

Pourangahua was a Māori rangatira (chieftain) of the Ngāti Kahungunu iwi and Ngāti Hingānga hapū, based at Papuni in the Ruakituri valley north of Hawke Bay of New Zealand. He probably lived in the mid-eighteenth century. In legend, he was involved in the creation of Lake Papuni. The area remains in the possession of his descendants today.

== Life ==
Pourangahua was the son of Ngoingoi and Te Arero. Through Ngoingoi, he was a descendant of Hingānga, ancestor of Ngāti Hingānga, and thus of Ruapani, Kahukuranui, and Kahungunu. Through Te Arero, he was descended from Marupapanui. He belonged to Ngāti Hingānga and Ngāti Te Wahanga or Ngāti Wawahanga. He had pa (fortified villages) at Puke-tapu and Te Arero. The area was located on one of the main routes from the Urewera ranges occupied by Tuhoe and the coastal Hawke Bay areas occupied by Ngāti Kahungunu. Although Tuhoe and Kahungunu were hostile to one another, Pourangahua maintained good relations with both as a taha rua ("friend to both sides").

=== Lake Papuni ===
According to legend, the hill Orakai-Whaia on the west side of the Ruakituri River fell in love with the hill Tauranga-a-Tara on the east side of the river and invited her to marry him; she agreed and moved over to join Orakai-Whaia. This blocked the river and caused the land behind the hills to flood, creating Lake Papuni. Pourangahua rowed over in his canoe and performed magic spells which forced the two hills apart, creating the lake's outlet. J. H. Mitchell suggested that this story preserves memory of an earthquake that caused a landslip to block the river. In another story, the lake was instead created by the taniwha Ruamano. Lake Pupuni remained there until 1856, when the digging of a channel accidentally burst the weir at the end of the lake.

== Family and commemoration ==
Pourangahua married Hine-whe and had two children, including Hikawai, who married Mihikitekapua from the Tamakaimoana of Tuhoe. They had five sons, including Mahia Te Koari, whose death in battle in 1819 sparked an invasion of Te Papuni by Tuhoe. Mahia was father of Wi Tipuna, father of Ihaka, father of Hawea Tipuna, who died in 1941. Te Papuni was awarded to Pourangahua's descendants by the Maori Land Court. Ngāti Hingānga is also known as Te Aitanga o Pourangahua ("the progeny of Pourangahua") in his honour.

The wharenui of Erepēti marae, which is located in Ruakituri and belongs to Ngāti Hingānga, is named Pourangahua after this ancestor. At the Takatimu wharenui at Waihirere marae, Te-O-Tane is depicted on one of the poupou.

== Bibliography ==
- Mitchell, J. H. (2014). Takitimu: A History of Ngati Kahungunu. Libro International. ISBN 978-1-877514-72-2.
- Waitangi Tribunal (2017). Te Urewera I (WAI 894) (PDF). Legislation Direct. ISBN 978-1-86956-325-7.
