= Te Whatuiāpiti =

Places in the life of Te Whatuiāpiti
1 Te Kauhanga
2 Wainui
3 Marotiri on the Te Aho-ā-Māui
4 Kaikoura near Ōtāne
5 Pakipaki
6 Waimārama
7 Pōhatunui-ā-Toru in the Ruahine Range (rough location)
8 Tawhitinui, Lake Oingo
9 Rotoatara
10 Oueroa
11 Te Iho o Te Rei island & Keketerau
12 Mataruahou (Napier Hill)
13 Parehemanihi, near Ōmahu

Te Whatuiāpiti was a Māori rangatira (chieftain) of Ngāti Kahungunu from the Hawke’s Bay region of New Zealand and the ancestor of the Ngāti Te Whatuiāpiti hapū. He probably lived in the late 17th century.

As a member of Te Hika a Pāpāuma, Te Whatuiāpiti was locked in a multi-generational feud with his cousins in Te Hika a Ruarauhanga. As a result, in his youth he was driven out of the Hawke’s Bay region, finding sanctuary in the Wairarapa. Later, he returned and, after a conflict with a rival chief named Pokia, he established himself at Te Kauhanga (modern Haumoana) and on Lake Rotoatara (near Te Aute). After further conflict, he fell in love with Te Huhuti, daughter of Te Rangitaumaha of Te Hika a Ruarauhanga, who married him and ended the feud between the two families. Their courtship is considered to be one of the great romances of Māori tradition.

== Life ==
Te Whatuiāpiti was the son of Te Hikawera (I) and Hinetemoa. Through his father, he was a descendant of Rākei-hikuroa by his wife Pāpāuma; Kahungunu; Tamatea Arikinui, the captain of the Tākitimu canoe; and the early explorer Toi. Hinetemoa was a granddaughter of Ngarengare, the ancestor of Ngāti Ngarengare, a hapū of Ngāti Kahungunu based in Wairoa District, who had fled south and married Te Hikawera after her people suffered a devastating defeat at the hands of Tama-te-rangi and Rakaipaaka. He had one younger brother, Te Apunga, whose daughter, Tauapare, later married Te Whatuiāpiti’s son Te Hikawera. After Rākei-hikuroa's death, an enduring feud developed between the descendants of Pāpāuma (Te Hika a Pāpāuma) and the descendants of one of his other wives, Ruarauhanga (Te Hika a Ruarauhanga).

Te Whatuiāpiti had red hair, and is said to have been one of the most handsome chiefs of his time.

=== Expulsion and return to Heretaunga ===
Te Whatuiāpiti grew up at Te Kauhanga, at the mouth of the Ngaruroro River in the Heretaunga Plains, in the Hawke’s Bay region. But when he was still a young man, Tū-whakawhiu-rangi and Ngāti Rakaipaaka attacked Te Kauhanga on behalf of Te Hika a Ruarauhanga. He fled with some elders to his cousin Tumapuhia in the Wairarapa, abandoning his pregnant wife, Te Kuramahinono. She was saved by Tahinga, one of the attackers. When she subsequently gave birth to a boy, Rangiwawahia, she pretended that he was a girl, to prevent her captors from eating him.

In Wairarapa, Te Whatuiāpiti developed his military skills by leading attacks on Waingawa (near Masterton) and Ōtaki (on the Kapiti coast). He then began to set himself up for a reconquest of Heretaunga. First, he attacked Wainui, fought the Rangitāne, and made peace with them. This allowed him to establish a base of operations at Marotiri on the nearby Te Aho a Māui peninsula. From there, he led a number of raids into his old territory. He defeated and killed Tupokonui and Tupaka at Kaikoura near Ōtāne, he killed Muheke at Pakipaki, and he defeated Ngāti Kahungunu at Waimārama in the battle of Waipuka.

=== Conflict with Pokia ===
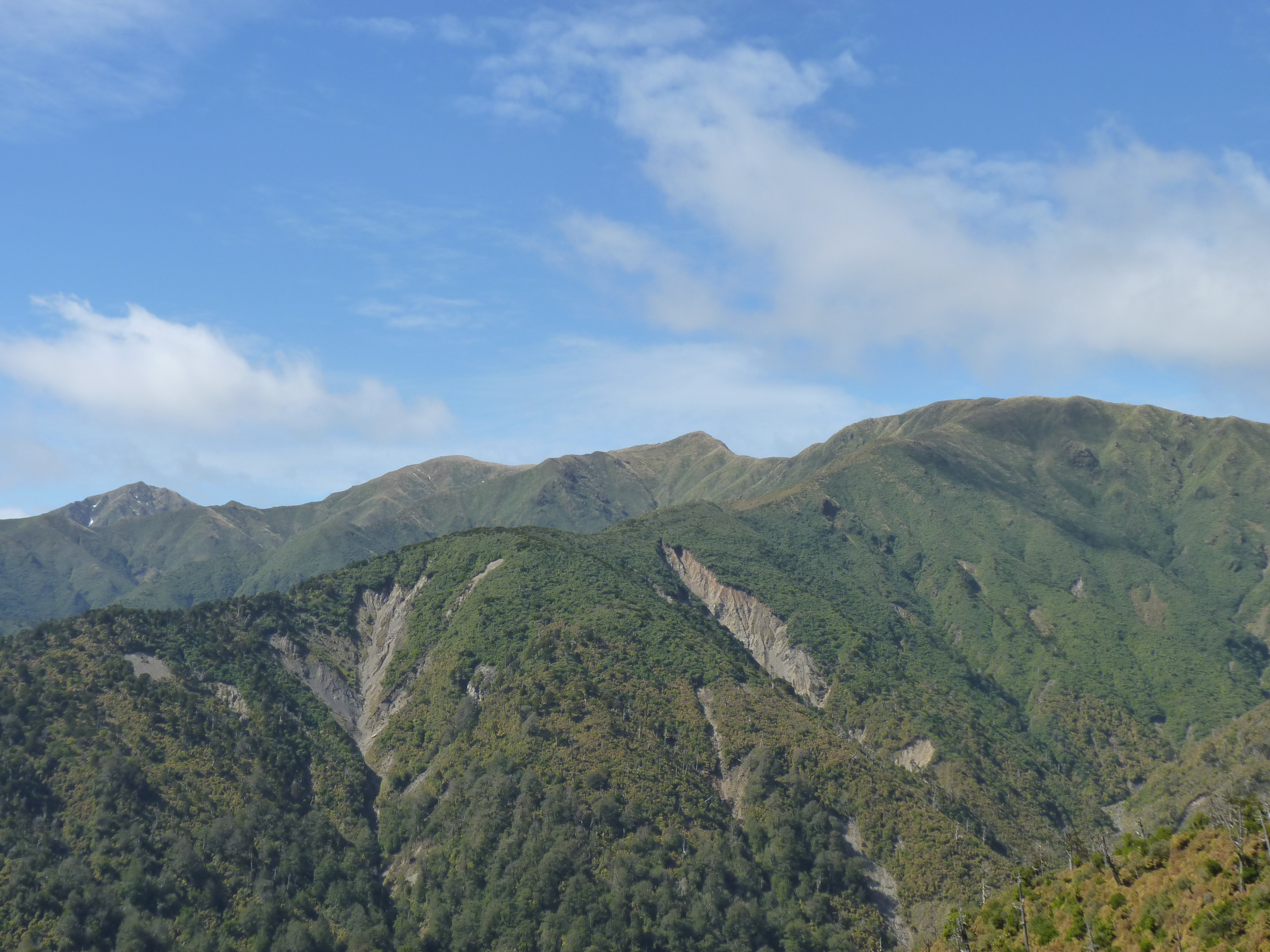
Ruahine Range

A Ngāti Kahungunu chieftain called Pokia attacked Marotiri in order to stop the raids, but he was defeated, so he sent Hine Te Aorangi to make peace and offer to let Te Whatuiāpiti return to his ancestral lands. Te Whatuiāpiti responded by settling at Pohatunui a Toru in the Ruahine Range and sent a message to Pokia promising him a gift of forty women. Pokia built a house called Mata Kakahi for these women at Tawhitinui, Lake Oingo. When Te Whatuiāpiti sent his uncle Te Aokamiti with the women, Pokia killed them all and led an invasion of the Ruahine range in order to kill Te Whatuiāpiti. He wounded Te Whatuiāpiti and killed his cousin Tumapuhia. Te Whatuiāpiti fled to Pohatunui a Toru, a fortress on top of a rock pinnacle in the Ruahine range, where Pokia was unable to reach him.

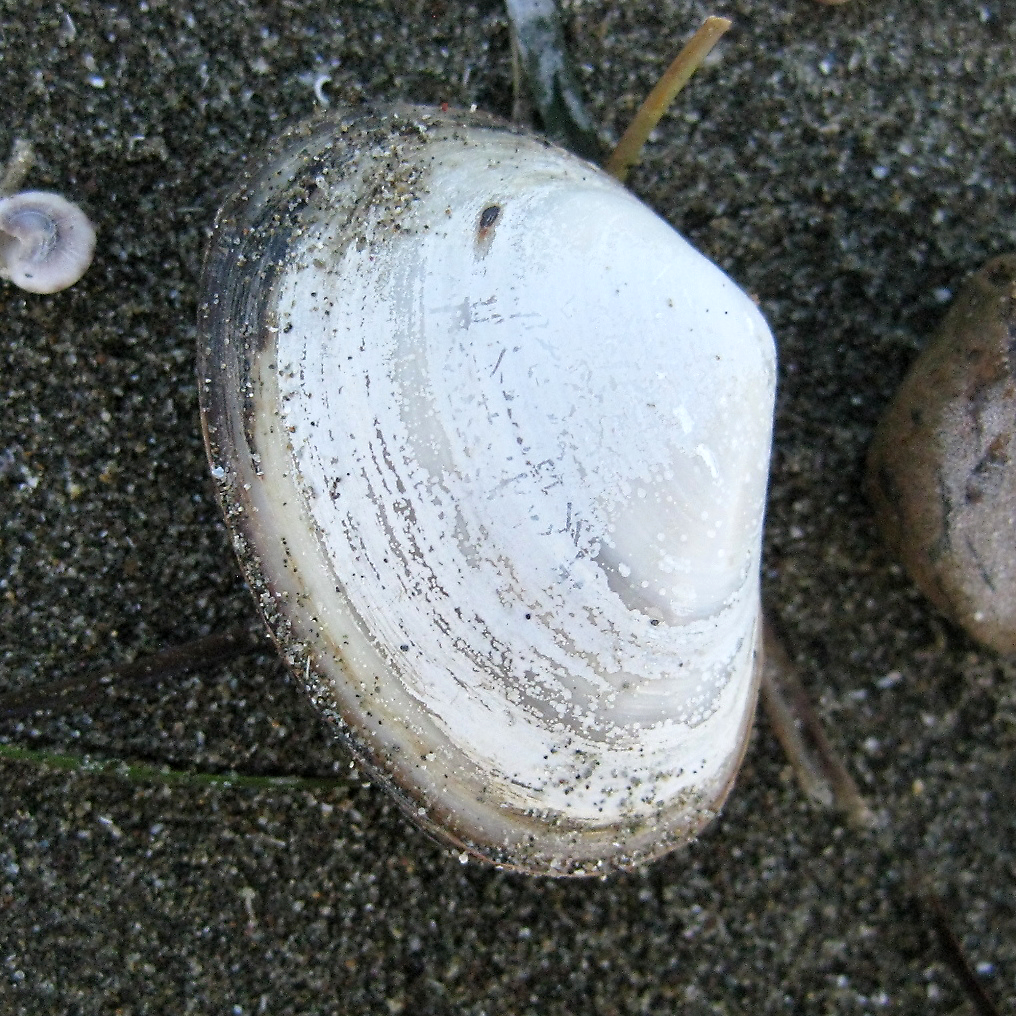
Pipi.

Te Whatuiāpiti now planned to attack Pokia and Tahinga, at their village, Takutai o te Rangi. His father, Hikawera, persuaded Te Rangiwhakaewa of Rangitane to join this campaign. They found out that Pokia’s people were accustomed to go out to Otatara to dig fern root and gather pipi. Te Whatuiāpiti’s men hid themselves in the bush surrounding Takutai o Te Rangi and Otara. After picking off the men heading out of the fortress one-by-one, Takutai o Te Rangi was nearly empty and the war party quickly took it. At the same time, other contingents attacked the men digging fern roots at Otatara, in the battle of Aro Aro Tahuri, and the women and children collecting pipi in the battle of Te Roropipi. Pokia, Tahinga, and Te Rangitaumaha of Te Hika a Ruarauhanga escaped.

After the battle, Te Whatuiāpiti finally reoccupied his original home, Te Kauhanga, splitting his time between there and his mother’s village at Rotoatara. Tahinga settled on Te Iho o Te Rei island in the Te Whanganui-a-Orotū harbour (the old inner harbour at Napier, which was destroyed during the 1931 Hawke's Bay earthquake), and Te Rangitaumaha settled at Oueroa.

=== Battle of Te Upokopoito ===
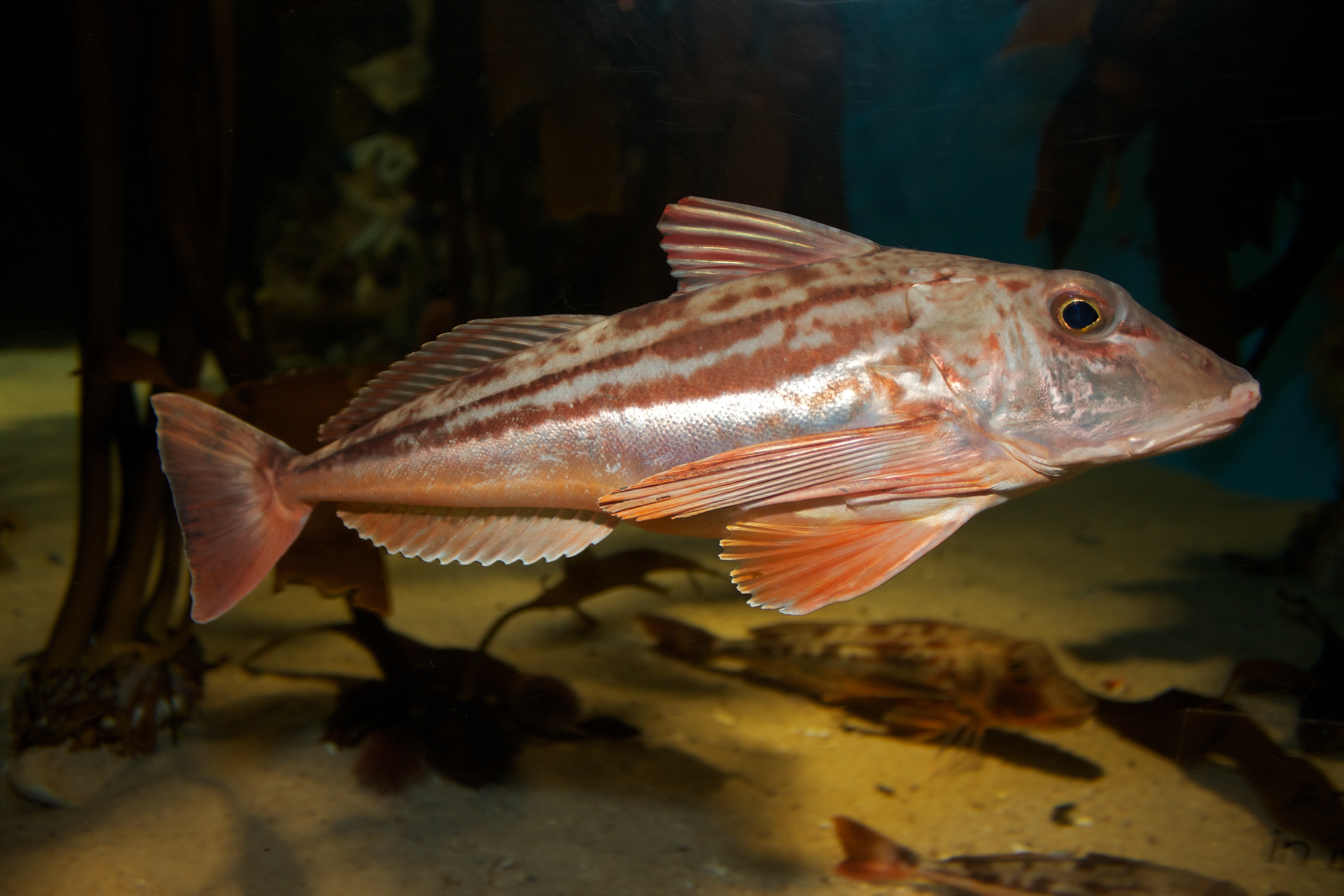
Kumukumu (red gurnard)

Te Whatuiāpiti heard that he had been called a kumukumu (red gurnard), on account of his red hair. Te Whatuiāpiti considered this a curse and led a war party to attack the fortress at Te Iho o Te Rei. A force came out from the island in canoes, led by Tahinga, Ika i Te Atu, Te Mata, and Rangitahia. They met Te Whatuiāpiti at Keteketerau (the entrance to the old inner harbour at Napier), so he retreated to Mataruahou (then an island, now Napier Hill).

Te Whatuiāpiti appealed to the tohunga, Pakaotori to rescue them. He pulled off his clothes and jumped into the water at Upokopoito, holding Te Whatuiāpiti’s atua, Parukakariki. This caused a windstorm to appear which sank the enemy ships. Te Whatuiāpiti’s men captured the survivors as they came ashore and killed them, including Te Maha and Te Ika i Te Atu. Tahinga was allowed to live, because he had earlier saved Te Whatuiāpiti’s wife. After this victory, Te Whatuiāpiti’s control of Heretaunga was confirmed and peace was made.

=== Attack on Parehemanihi ===
Te Rangitaumaha of Te Hika a Ruarauhanga invited Te Whatuiāpiti to a feast at his village, Parehemanihi, near Ōmahu. Suspecting a trap, Te Whatuiāpiti sent a group of women with an old man. Te Rangitaumaha was offended, imprisoning the party and planned to cook them. However, a relative of Te Whatuiāpiti in the village snuck into the prison, gave the old man a whale bone mere, and took a message from him to Te Whatuiāpiti, who began forming a war party to rescue the captives.

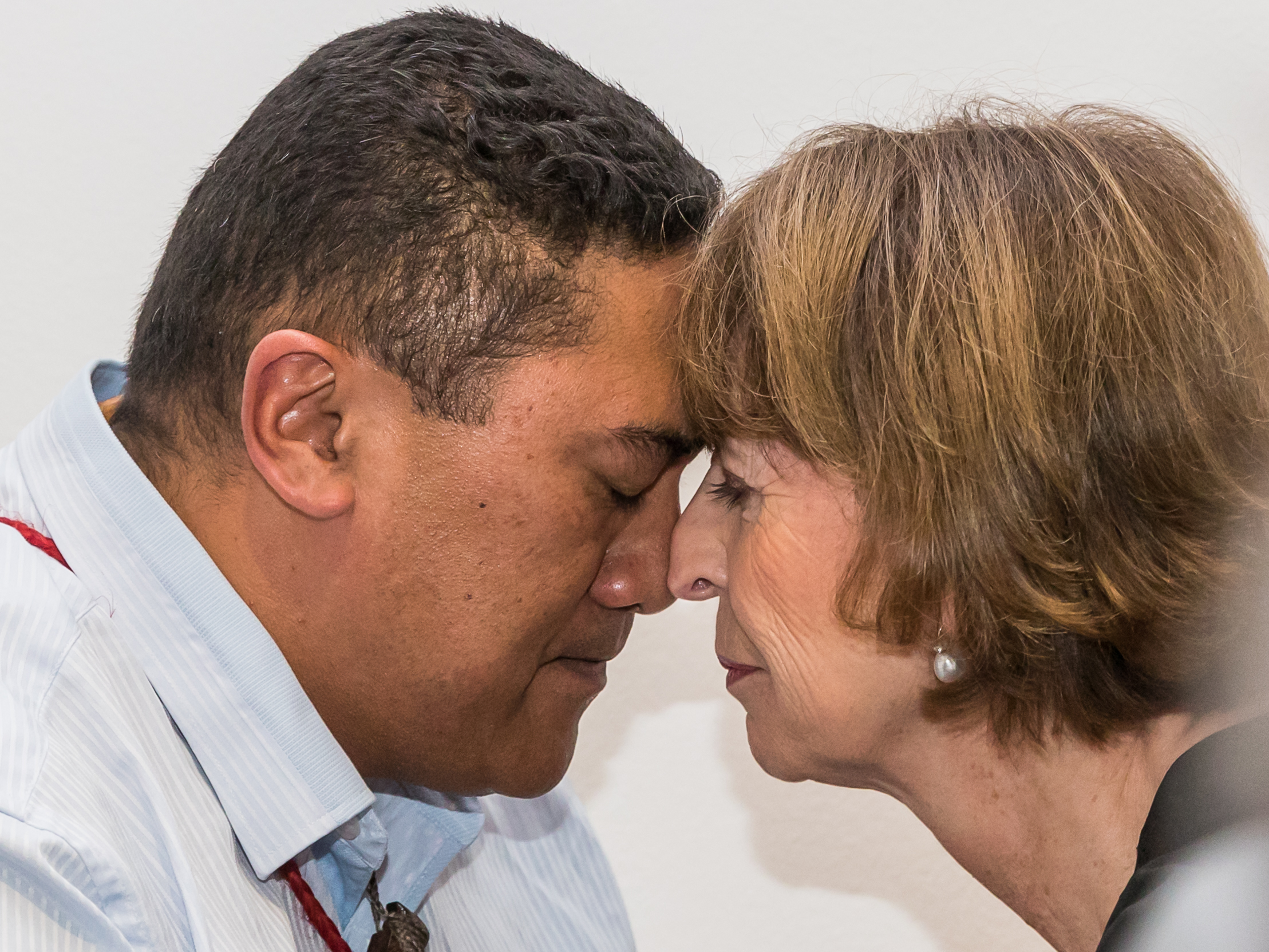
Two people performing the hongi.

Te Whatuiāpiti sent an envoy to Irakumia at Tāmaki-nui-a-Rua, whom he had defeated and made peace with the previous year, to ask him to come and help. When the envoy arrived, he was imprisoned, but he said to Irakumia that he had “come from Te Whatuiāpiti’s nose,” a reference to the hongi, or touching of noses, with which Te Whatuiāpiti and Irakumia had sealed their peace. Then Irakumia agreed to aid the war party.

Te Whatuiāpiti attacked Parehemanihi and fought with great prowess. Te Rangitaumaha’s daughter Te Huhuti was watching the battle from the ramparts and was instantly taken with him. When Te Whatuiāpiti caught sight of her, he was struck by her beauty, and immediately ended the battle and made peace, even though he had been winning. He was invited into the village for dinner and there he secretly slept with Te Huhuti and told her to come to him at Rotoatara.

=== Journey of Te Huhuti ===
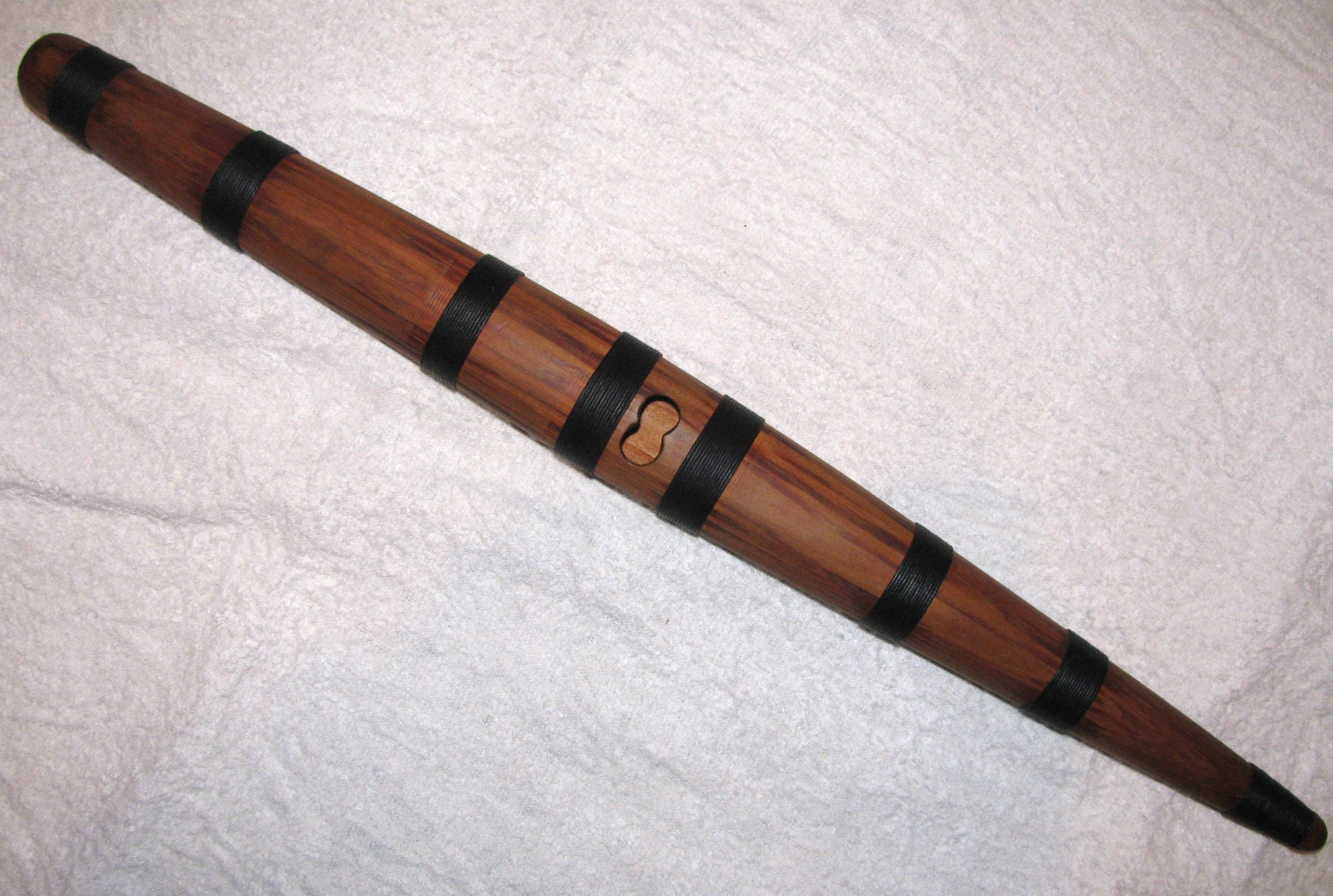
A pūtōrino flute.

Te Huhuti snuck out of her village and travelled to Lake Rotoatara, but she arrived there late in the evening and found that there was no way to get to the island where the village was located. So, Te Huhuti swam across the lake, guided in one version by a love song that Te Whatuiāpiti played on his pūtōrino flute, which was called Te Aometikirangi. Initially, Te Whatuiāpiti’s mother, Hinetemoa, bitterly opposed his marriage to Te Huhuti, but she then gave way. The marriage ended the feud between Te Hika a Pāpāuma and Te Hika a Ruarauhanga. The story is considered one of the great Māori romances and has been compared to the more famous tale of Hinemoa and Tūtānekai. It is commemorated by a traditional song of Ngāti Te Whatuiāpiti, which is recorded by John Te Herekiekie Grace:

E noho e tama i roto i to pa i Te Rotoatara,
Hangaia to whare ko Pakewairangi.
E piki e tama ki runga ki to pa,
Whakatangi ai i to pu
Ko Te Aometikirangi ra te pūtōrino e tama,
Ka puta ai koe ki te whaiao ki te aomarama!

—Grace 1959, p. 285

Remain, sir, in your fort at Te Rotoatara
And build the house Pakewairangi.
Ascend, sir, to the watchtower of the fort
And play your love song again.
Te Aometikirangi is your flute, sir,
It will lead you into the world of light!

=== Te Rangitaumaha’s gift ===
When Te Huhuti gave birth to her first child, Te Wawahanga, her father Te Rangitaumaha came to Rotoatara in order to perform the tohi baptismal ritual and named the child Wawahanga. He brought a gift of shellfish and eels from Lake Oingo and Lake Runanga, but Te Huhuti was dismayed at the small size of the gift compared to that which she had received from Te Whatuiāpiti, so Te Rangitaumaha gifted Te Huhuti her “elders and brothers” as servants of Wawahanga. Sources differ as to whether this meant her elder brothers, Hinehore, Hikateko, and Taraia (the Ngāti Hineiao hapū) or the Ngāpuhi, Ngāti Ngāwera, Ngāti Te Ao hapū. Different sources also strongly disagree about whether Te Rangitaumaha also gifted large areas of land in the Heretaunga region to Wawahanga. These questions were material to a hearing of the Māori Land Court on claims to the region around Ōmahu in 1889.

When Te Wawahanga was grown up, he married Te Aopatuwhare, but he became sick and died while she was pregnant. Te Whatuiāpiti asked his son for instructions, expecting him to pass his wife to his younger brother, Te Hikawera, Te Wawahanga insisted that she should pass to Te Whatuiāpiti himself. Te Rangitaumaha’s lands were nevertheless ultimately inherited by Te Hikawera.

=== Te Tomo and Waitara ===
In his old age, Te Whatuiāpiti's son Te Hikawera went to Tarawera in the Ahimanawa Range to take possession of the area. When he returned to Te Whatuiāpiti at Lake Rotoatara, Te Whatuiāpiti told one of his men, Te Tomo, to get fish and eels ready for a feast in honour of Te Hikawera’s return, but Te Tomo ate the food himself, so Te Whatuiāpiti killed Te Tomo and served him as the feast instead. Te Hikawera took Te Tomo’s bones with him when he left and made them into spear points, washing them in the Mohaka River at a place that was therefore named Waitara (‘water of spear-points’). Then he made his base at Te Purotu.

== Family ==
Te Whatuiāpiti first married Te Kuramahinono and had one son:

- Rangiwawahia

Te Whatuiāpiti later married Hinepehinga, who was given to him by her father Kotore of Wairoa as a peace offering, but she avoided sleeping with him because she was in love with another, so he allowed her to leave.

Te Whatuiāpiti and Te Huhuti had three sons and a daughter:

- Te Wawahanga, who married Te Aopatuwhare:

- Te Rangikawhiua

- Manawaakawa, who married Numia i te rangi and Hinehare, daughters of his grand-uncle, Te Hikawera:

- Te Rangikoianake, ancestor of Ngāi Te Rangikoianake
- Te Operoa
- Tarewai

- Te Hikawera, ancestor of Ngāti Pārau.
- Mihikitekapua (daughter)
- Keke

Te Whatuiāpiti married his son’s widow, Te Aopatuwhare, and they had a son and a daughter:

- Whatumariari
- Hinemihi

== Sources ==
The story of Te Whatuiāpiti’s reconquest of Heretaunga was reported by Hamana Tiakiwai to the Native Land Court at hearings in 1886 and 1889. Tiakiwai also recounted the gift of Te Rangitaumaha in 1889, but his version was challenged at the hearing by Meihana Takihi and Paora Kaiwhata.

The story of Te Huhuti is first recorded in George Grey’s Polynesian Mythology of 1854. H. J. Fletcher published another version in 1926, which he received from Hoeta Te Hata of Ngāti Tūwharetoa, a descendant of Te Whatuiāpiti and Te Huhuti. A similar version is given by John Te Herekiekie Grace.

== Bibliography ==
- Grace, John Te Herekiekie (1959). Tuwharetoa: The History of the Maori People of the Taupo District. Auckland [N.Z.]: A.H. & A.W. Reed.
- Grey, George (1854). Polynesia Mythology & Ancient Traditional History of the New Zealanders.
- Parsons, Patrick (1997). WAI 400: The Ahuriri Block: Maori Customary Interests (PDF).
- Te Hata, Hoeta; Fletcher, H. J. (1918). "Ngati-Tuhare-toa occupation of Taupo-nui-a-tia". Journal of the Polynesian Society. 27: 38–46.
- Te Hata, Hoeta; Fletcher, H. J. (1926). "The Story of Te Huhuti of Te Roto-a-tara". Journal of the Polynesian Society. 35: 31–35.
