= Rongomaiwahine =

Rongomaiwahine was a Māori chieftainess and chief ancestress of the Ngāti Rongomaiwahine, Ngāti Kahungunu, and Te Aitanga-a-Māhaki iwi. She lived on the Māhia Peninsula, probably in the late fifteenth century.

== Life ==
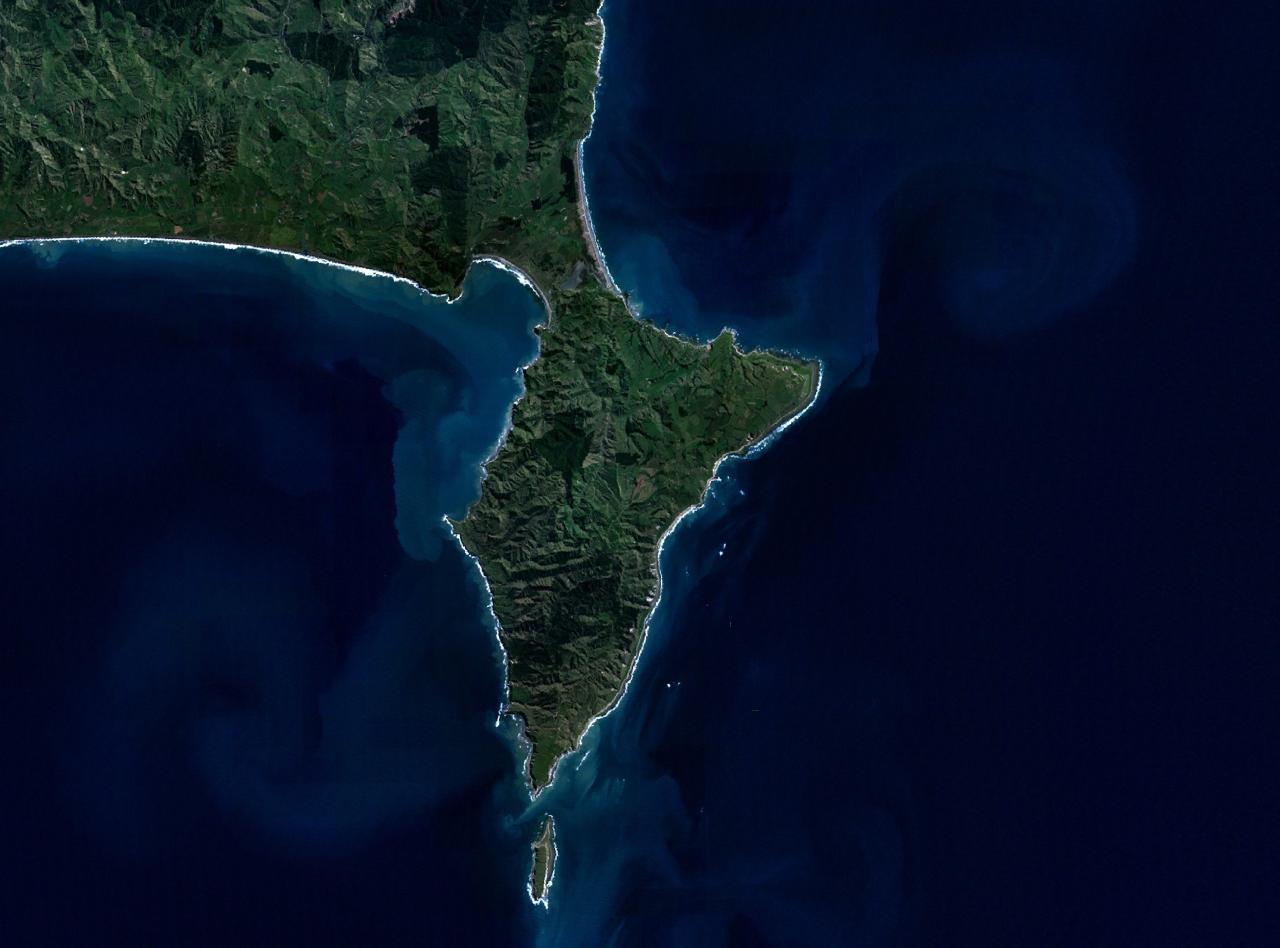
Satellite image of Māhia Peninsula, where Rongomaiwahine lived.

Rongomaiwahine was the daughter of Rapanui and grew up at Te Awapata on Māhia. Her ancestry is uncertain. Mitchell mentions "claims" that she was descended from Ruawharo, the tohunga (priest) of the Tākitimu canoe, and Popoto, one of the captains of the Kurahaupō canoe, which had made landfall at Te Awapata.

Kahungunu had entered the East Cape region after departing from the Bay of Plenty due to an argument with his brother. He married several women of the region, including Hine-puariari, who said kāore hoki tērā te hanga o tāku tane, kāore e rūpeke mai ana, takoto noa mai te nuinga i waho ("the remarkable thing is that my husband's thing wouldn't fit! Most of it had to stay out!"). When she heard this, Rongomaiwahine declared Nā te mea anō rā he kōpua pāpaku, mehemea e taka mai ana ki te kōpua hōhonu a Rapa e tuhera atu nei, pokopoko ana ia ki roto ("that's because it is a shallow pool; if it had fallen into the deep pool of Rapa [i.e. her father] now opening towards him, it would have been lost out of sight"). Kahungunu heard this as a challenge and travelled to Māhia, determined to marry Rongomai-wahine. In the meanwhile, however, she had married a local wood-carver, Tama-taku-tai.

On arrival, Kahungunu demonstrated his prowess by leading an expedition to gather aruhe (fern root) in the hills. Once they had gathered a large amount, he tied it together in a huge bundle, using vines (a.k.a. turihanga) and carried the whole huge bundle by himself to the top of the cliffs above the village, and let it roll down the cliff "like a landslide," filling the whole village with aruhe. Next, he led an expedition to the sea to collect pāua (abalonie shellfish). He dove down underwater with a kāwhiu basket on the end of a rope, filling it repeatedly, while the other members of the expedition hauled it up, emptied it, and threw it back to him. Finally, he simply stuck the pāua to his body, and surfaced covered in the shellfish. At the feast, Kahungunu ate all of the roe of the pāua himself. This made him very flatulent; in the middle of the night he got up, went over to where Rongomai-wahine and Tama-taku-tai were sleeping and farted all over them. Rongomai-wahine woke up, blamed the smell on Tama-taku-tai and left him.

The next day, Kahungunu found Tama-taku-tai at the beach, practicing whakaheke ngaru (riding the breaking waves in his canoe, somewhat like surfing). He convinced Tama-taku-tai to let him join him in the canoe and intentionally capsized the boat, drowning Tama-taku-tai. Kahungunu went with Rongomai-wahine to a stream and asked her to wash his hair. When she tied his topknot (koukou) with local flax, it broke, so he gave her flax from his tātua pūpara (war belt), with which she was able to tie up his hair. He said, "here is the binding broad-leaved flax of Tamatea that was left at Tauranga," thereby revealing his identity. After this, they married.

Rongomai-wahine became pregnant and gave birth to a daughter. Kahungunu's father, Tamatea, set out from Ōpōtiki with gifts for the child, but heard that the girl was actually the child of Tama-taku-tai, so he threw away the gifts and turned around. As a result, the girl was named Hine-rauiri ("castaway girl"). Subsequently, Kahungunu and Rongomai-wahine had five children, three sons and two daughters.

== Family ==
By Tama-taku-tai, Rongomai-wahine had two daughters, the ancestors of Ngāti Rongomaiwahine:

- Rapuaiterangi
- Hine-rauiri, born after her father's death:

- Te Ahiwhakamauroa, who married her cousin Tawhiwhi:

- Hine-pua, who married Tama-konohi:

- Karakia-rau:

- Hikairo, ancestor of Ngāti Hikairo.

By Kahungunu, she had five children:

- Kahukuranui (son)
- Rongomai-papa (daughter), who married her own maternal grandfather, Ruapani and had a daughter:

- Ruarauhanga, who married Rākei-hikuroa and was the ancestor of the Te Hika a Ruarauhanga division of Ngāti Kahungunu.

- Tamatea-kota (son), who married Rongo-kauae, daughter of Rongo-whakaata:

- Kahatapere, whose twin sons Tarakiuta and Tarakitai were murdered by Rākei-hikuroa or Tūpurupuru.

- Mahakinui (son), who married Tawake-Whakato and had no issue.
- Tauhei-kurī (daughter), who married Kahungunu's nephew Tama-taipunoa and had two sons:

- Tawhiwhi, who married Te Ahiwhakamauroa (see above).
- Māhaki, ancestor of Te Aitanga-a-Māhaki.

== Commemoration ==
In 1894 the Anglican Church held a series of rallies to build Māori enthusiasm for the church and encourage the construction of new church buildings. At these rallies each group would carry a flag and sing songs honouring their most prestigious ancestor. The section of Ngāti Kahungunu based at Māhia, led by Eraiha Maru carried the flag of Rongmoaiwahine and their flag was always allowed to fly in the highest position. J. H. Mitchell records two of the songs sung on these occasions, which include the line, "I have four permanent sources of mana in the world: Jehovah, Christ, the Holy Ghost, and Rongomaiwahine."

Rongomai-wahine is carved on the pare (door lintel) of the Takitimu wharenui at Waihīrere marae, built at Wairoa in 1926. This location is traditionally reserved for the woman considered to be the mother of the tribe connected to the marae. She is similarly honoured on the pare of Kahungunu wharenui at Kahungunu Marae, built at Nūhaka in 1949.

=== Sources ===
J. H. Mitchell and Thomas Lambert, Old Wairoa recount the story of Rongomai-wahine, largely based on an account recorded by Percy Smith, who heard it from Pango of Te Arawa.

== Bibliography ==
- Mitchell, J. H. (2014). Takitimu: A History of Ngati Kahungunu. Libro International. ISBN 978-1-877514-72-2.
- Parsons, Patrick (1997). WAI 400: The Ahuriri Block: Maori Cusomary Interests (PDF).
