= Kahukuranui =

Legendary Maori chieftain

Places in the life of Kahukuranui
1 Nukutaura, Māhia Peninsula
2 Ōtātara (Taradale)
3 Te Pōrangahau

Kahukuranui was a Māori ariki (chieftain) of the Ngāti Kahungunu iwi and ancestor of the Ngāti Kahukuranui hapū of Te Aitanga-a-Hauiti. He led an expedition to Te Pōrangahau in order to avenge Tūpouriao and marry his widow Tū-teihonga. He may have lived in the fifteenth or sixteenth centuries.

== Life ==
Kahukuranui was the son of Kahungunu and Rongomaiwahine. He was born at Nukutaurua on Mahia Peninsula and was the only one of their children to receive a whare-kōhanga ("nest house"), a building specially erected for the mother to give birth in. Through his father, he was a direct descendant of Tamatea Arikinui, captain of the Tākitimu canoe. Through his mother, he was probably descended from Ruawharo, the tohunga (priest) of the Tākitimu, and Popoto, one of the captains of the Kurahaupō canoe. Mitchell characterises him as a man of peace, like his father, who secured his position through marriages, notably with Ruatapu-wahine, an adoptive daughter of his maternal grandfather.

=== Battle of Kai-whakareireia ===
Kahukuranui's brother Tuaiti had married Moetai daughter of Moeahu and settled at Rurutawhao at Aranui (near Frasertown). Tuaiti murdered his brother-in-law Te Rironga, so Moeahu and his son-in-law Rongo-whakaata killed Tuaiti. The elderly Kahungunu went to Wairoa and got the rangatira Wekanui to lead a war party to get revenge on Rongo-whakaata. Kahukuranui also joined the campaign. At the Battle of Kai-whakareireia, Wekanui was victorious and captured a noblewoman named Pou-wharekura (a great-grand-niece of Kahungunu). Wekanui and Kahukuranui both claimed Pou-wharekura. To avoid a conflict, Kahungunu married her himself.

=== Courting Tū-teihonga ===
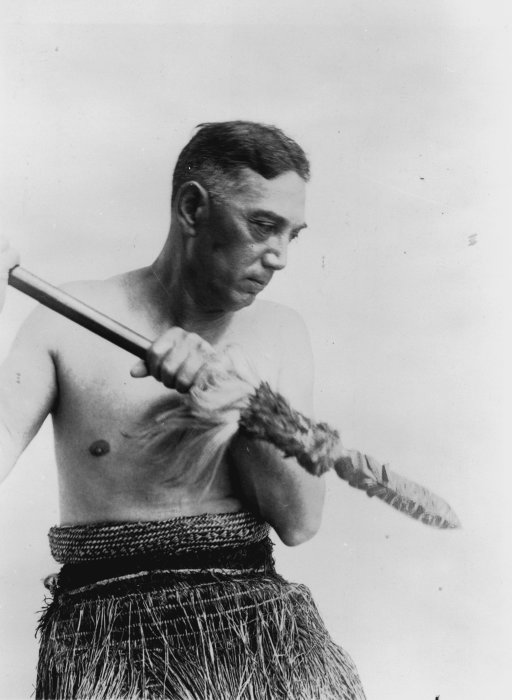
Portrait of Te Rangi Hīroa (Peter Henry Buck) dressed in Maori costume and holding a taiaha 1930s.

Kahukuranui heard that Tūpouriao of Ōtātara (near Taradale) had been killed in battle with Te Pōrangahau and resolved to marry Tūpouriao's beautiful widow Tū-teihonga. He arrived at Ōtātara at night and Tū-teihonga would not see him, so he stood outside where she was sleeping and said ure whakapā-ko-ko ("penis touches it") and she said Ko wai tēnei e whakapā-ko-ko mai nei? ("Who's that there saying 'touches it'?"). Kahukuranui announced himself and his wish to marry her, but she said that she would not remarry until Tūpouriao had been avenged.

Therefore, Kahukuranui set out for Te Pōrangahau's settlement, also called Te Pōrangahau (south of Waipukurau) with a war party of 250 men. Tū-te-ihonga said that Te Pōrangahau would be identifiable as a man in a cloak of kākā feathers, wielding a taiaha-kura. Te Pōrangahau appeared and single-handedly drove back the attackers, until he reached Kahukuranui, who took him captive and brought him back to Ōtātara, where Tū-te-ihonga killed him. She then married Kahukuranui.

== Family ==
Kahukuranui married Ruatapuwahine, Their children were:

- Rākei-hikuroa (son), ancestor of the Ngāti Kahungunu hapu in Heretaunga
- Rongomai-tara (daughter), who married her cousin Kahutapere (son of Tamatea-kota and grandson of Kahungunu), and later Tautuhika.

- Tara-ki-uta and Tara-ki-tai (twin sons of Kahutapere, murdered by Rākei-hikuroa or his son Tupurupuru.
- Te Aonui (son of Tautuhika), married Paikuha:

- Hine-tapuarau, first wife of Māhaki
- Hine-te-kawa (daughter):

- Hine-te-ata (daughter), who married her cousin Makoro.
- Rongo-tawhao (son)

- Rongomai-awhea, wife of her cousin Tamanuhiri, one of the sons of Rākei-hikuroa

He also married Tū-te-ihonga. Their children were the ancestors of the main line of Ngāti Kahungunu:

- Hinemanuhiri (daughter), who married Pukaru, the son of Ruapani (her maternal grandfather and paternal great grandfather), with whom she had five children:

- Tama-te-rangi (son), ancestor of Ngāi Tamaterangi
- Makoro (son), who married Hine-te-ata

- Kotore

- Hingānga (son):

- Tikitiki

- Kauaetere

- Ngoingoi, who married Te Arero, descendant of Maru-papa-nui of Tuhoe:

- Pourangahua, ancestor of Ngāti Hingānga / Te Aitanga o Pourangahua

- Pupuni (son)
- Pare-ora (daughter)

- Rakaipaaka (son), ancestor of Ngāti Rakaipaaka

Finally, he married Hinekumu and had one child:

- Tamanuhiri.

Another child was:

- Maru-te-reinga

- Tamatea-Tokinui

- Maruāhaira, the ancestor of Ngāti Whakahemo.

== Commemoration ==
The Ngāti Kahukuranui hapū of Te Aitanga-a-Hauiti is named after Kahukuranui.

At Omāhu marae, which is linked to Ngāti Kahungunu, the wharenui is named Kahukuranui and the whare kai (dining hall) is named after his first wife Ruatapuwahine. At Kahungunu Marae at Nūhaka, which is linked to Ngāti Rakaipaaka, Kahukuranui was depicted on one of the original poupou (carved wall panels) of the wharenui, when it was opened in 1947. Later, his name was also given to the tiki carved on the koruru (gable) of the wharenui. This location that is traditionally reserved for the chief ancestor honoured by the marae.

== Bibliography ==
- Mitchell, J. H. (2014). Takitimu: A History of Ngati Kahungunu. Libro International. ISBN 978-1-877514-72-2.
- Parsons, Patrick (1997). WAI 400: The Ahuriri Block: Maori Cusomary Interests (PDF).
- Stafford, Don (1967). Te Arawa: A History of the Arawa People. Reed. ISBN 9780947506100.
- Te Waitohioterangi, Tanith Wirihana (2020). "Tupurupuru and the Murder of the top [spinning] twins". Nga Korero. (an account of the conflict between Rākei-hikuroa and Kahutapere transmitted from Hiraina Riria Pere, Hetekia Te Kani Pere II, and Hiraina Hinetoko).
