= Runanga =

Runanga may refer to:

- Rūnanga, a traditional Māori assembly or tribal gathering
- Rūnanga, the governing council or administrative group of a Māori Hapū or Iwi
- Rūnanga, a Māori translation of board of directors or council
- Runanga, New Zealand, a small town on the West Coast of New Zealand's South Island
- Runanga (crater)
- Runanga Lake, in the Hawke's Bay Region of New Zealand's North Island
