= Tama-i-uia =

Tama-i-uia was a rangatira of the Te Whānau a Taupara hapū of the Te Aitanga-a-Māhaki iwi of the East Cape of New Zealand. He is said to have fixed the western and eastern borders of Te Aitanga-a-Māhaki at Puhinui and Hinatore respectively. He might have lived in the sixteenth century.

== Life ==
Places in the life of Tama-i-uia
1 Puhinui, Tahora
2 Hinatore, Tolaga Bay

Tama-i-uia's father Whakauika was the son of Taupara, the founding ancestor of Te Whānau a Taupara, and a direct descendant of Māhaki, the founding ancestor of Te Aitanga-a-Māhaki. His mother, Tonoa-Ki-Aua, was the daughter of Hine-te-Ariki, a descendant of Uri-Taniwha, supernatural creatures that lived in deep still areas of rivers.

After the marriage, Tonoa-Ki-Aua became pregnant and the local people gathered for the birth, but were deeply disappointed when the child turned out to be a girl. They named the child Pikihoro ("climbing over slips"), in reference to the difficult slips that they had climbed over in order to gather. Tono-Ki-Aua again became pregnant and the people gathered again, bringing woven mats as gifts, but again the child was a girl and they complained. They named the child Hini-uru ("lady of gathering"), in reference to their gathering. Tono-Ki-Aua consulted the Uri-Taniwha on how to give birth to a male child and was instructed to totally avoid crossing, washing in, or drinking from rivers for the duration of her pregnancy. She obeyed these instructions and gave birth to a male child, who the people named Tama-i-uia ("The sought after boy"), because they had sought after him for so long.

=== Establishing Puhinui and Hinatore ===
As an adult, Tama-i-uia became a skilled warrior and commander, facing the Whakatōhea to his north, Ngāti Porou to the east, the Rongowhakaata to the south, and Tūhoe to the south. Tama-i-uia established the borders of Te Aitanga-a-Māhaki's territory (rohe), declaring a rock called Puhinui, near Te Tahora on the Waikohu River to be the western border and establishing a pā called Hinatore at Hauarau near Tolaga Bay as the eastern border.

While Tama-i-uia was away, Te Huiwhenua of Ngāti Porou attacked Hinatore and abducted his children. When he learned of this, Tama-i-uia retaliated, attacking a pā of Ngāti Porou in the night. At dawn, he went out before the pā alone and performed a magical war dance called the Tutu Taua, but part way through he stopped suddenly and fell to the ground. His troops ran over to him and found that Te Huiwhenua had let down ropes from the top of the walls and returned Tama-i-uia's children to him. The two sides made a peace which endured thereafter.

== Family ==
Tama-i-uia married five wives: Utatu, Wharitenga, Te Manawa, Wai-o-Rehua, Hine-i-Taitanui.

== Commemoration ==
The waiata sung at Tama-i-uia's death by Rangiuia of Uawa is preserved by J. H. Mitchell. Tama-i-uia is depicted with his wife Utatu and their son Te Rapinga on a poupou carving in the whare whakairo of the Mangatu Blocks office of Te Aitanga-a-Māhaki.

== Bibliography ==
- Mitchell, J. H. (2014). Takitimu: A History of Ngati Kahungunu. Libro International. ISBN 978-1-877514-72-2.
