= Kahungunu =

Māori chieftain

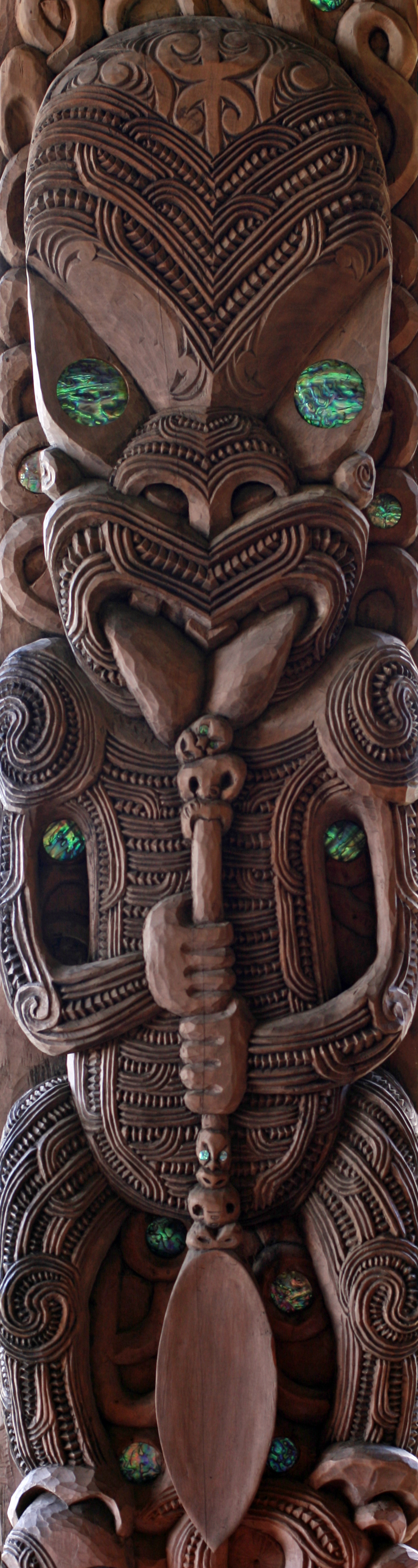
Kahungunu depicted with the canoe paddle of a navigator with pounamu decoration in a carving at the canoe house at Waitangi Treaty Grounds, Waitangi.

Kahungunu was a Māori ariki (chieftain) of the Tākitimu tribal confederation and ancestor of the Ngāti Kahungunu and Te Aitanga-a-Māhaki iwi. He probably lived in the late fifteenth century. Although born in Kaitaia, he was raised in Tauranga, leaving for the east coast after he quarrelled with his older brother. There he married a number of women and had numerous offspring. Tradition particularly dwells on his courtship of Rongomai-wahine, which culminated in the murder of her husband Tama-taku-tai. Afterwards, he settled at Maunga-a-kāhia on Māhia Peninsula. In his old age, he negotiated a peace when Maunga-a-kāhia was attacked by his nephew Tūtāmure and he summoned the war party which avenged his son at the Battle of Kai-whakareireia.

== Life ==
Kahungunu's father was the explorer Tamatea Urehaea, through whom he was descended from Tamatea Arikinui, who captained the Tākitimu canoe. His mother was Iwipupu, one of three daughters of Ira and Tokerau-wahine whom Tamatea married, through whom he was descended from Paikea. He was born while Tamatea was settled at Kaitaia in Northland. After his birth, Tamatea buried Kahungunu's umbilical cord nearby with three whatu-kura (sacred stones), so that it would be an iho-whenua, a link which would bind the land to him. These actions angered the local people, who banded together and drove Tamatea out of the region. Tamatea relocated to his ancestral home village of Mangatawa in Tauranga, where Kahungunu grew up.

Kahungunu was a particularly large man, but also committed to the arts of peace, rarely engaging in warfare. Hare Hongi reports a traditional saying about him: Ko Kahungunu he tangata ahuwhenua; mōhio ki te haere i ngā mahi o uta, me o te tai ("Kahungunu is an industrious man, who knows how to manage works, both on land and at sea") and notes his expertise at village-planning, farming, bird hunting, wood carving, tattooing, flax-weaving, canoe-making, navigation, fishing, and collection of shellfish.

=== Quarrel with Te Whaene ===
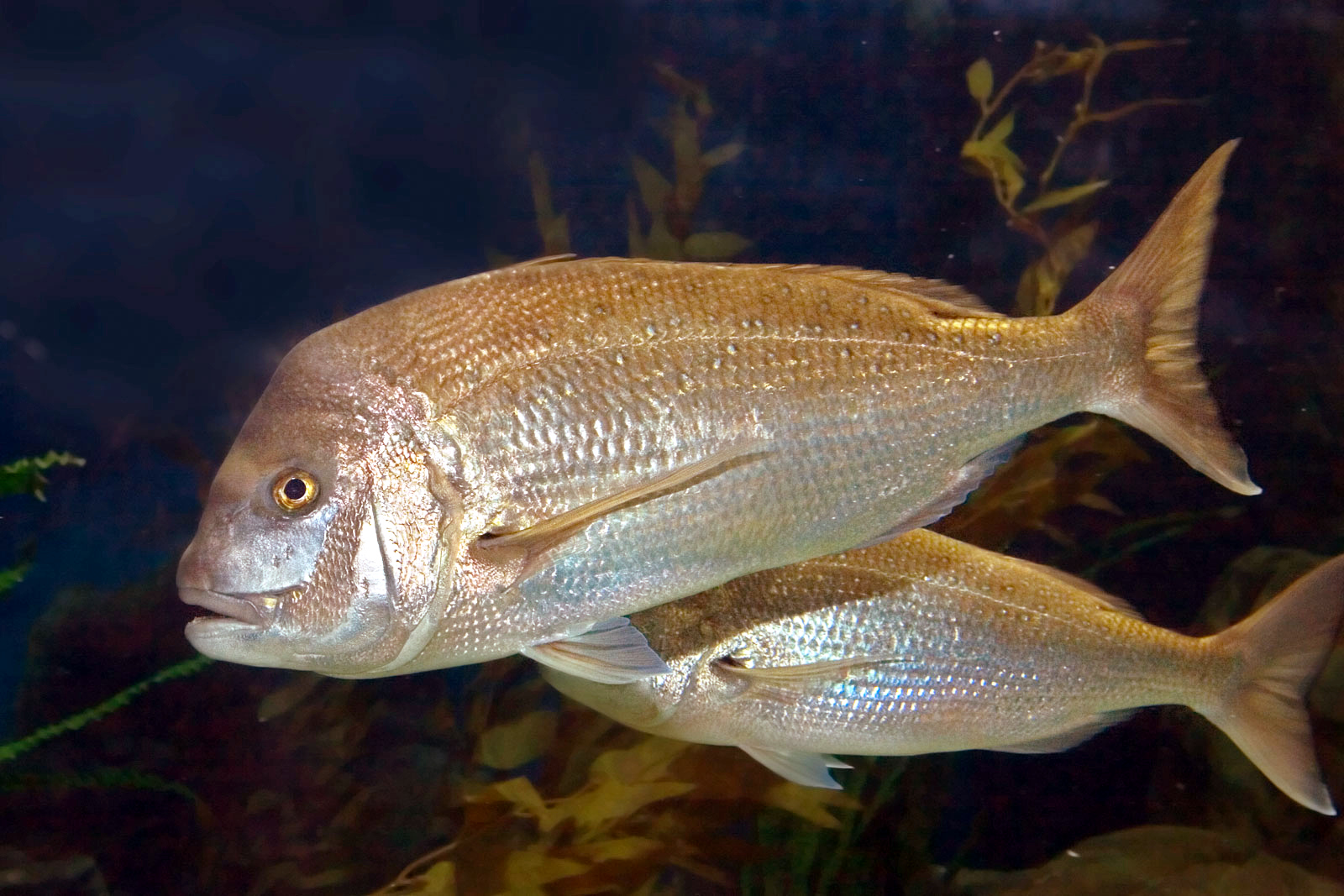
Tāmure fish (snapper).

At Otira near Tauranga, Kahungunu and his older brother Te Whaene went fishing. After the net had been pulled up, Kahungunu grabbed a fish for himself without first making an offering to the sea-god Tangaroa. Te Whaene angrily threw a tāmure fish (snapper) at Kahungunu, injuring his hand. Kahungunu therefore travelled to his sister Haumanga and her husband Tunanui Haruatai at Ōpōtiki and asked for men so that he could lead a war party (taua) against Te Whaene and get revenge. Tunanui agreed, but Kahungunu led the war party to Lake Rotorua instead of Tauranga. There he defeated the local Māori in the Battle of Te Awhenga and then returned to Ōpōtiki. Shortly after this, his sister gave birth to a son, whom Kahungunu named Tūtāmure ("snapper wound") in commemoration of his quarrel with Te Whaene.

=== Marriages on East Cape ===
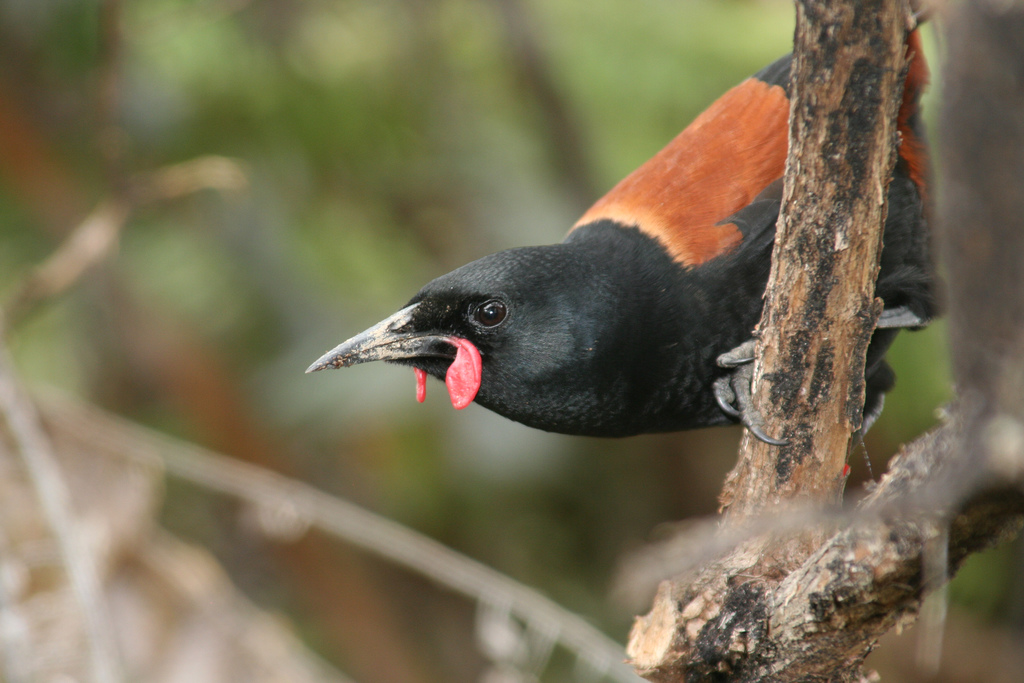
Tieke bird (saddleback).

Kahungunu travelled on to East Cape, where he came to the village of Popoia on the Waipaoa River, home of Ruapani (a descendant of Paoa and Kiwa). Kahungunu settled at Popoia and married Ruapani's daughter Ruaretai. When she was pregnant, she asked him for some birds to eat. He found a nest of tieke chicks and cooked them for her. As a result, when their daughter was born, she was named Ruahereheretieke.

After this, Kahungunu travelled to Whareongaonga Bay (near Young Nick's Head), where he fell in love with Hine-puariari, daughter of Panui, and married her. He also married her sister Kahukura-waiaraia and had two children with each of them.

=== Courting Rongomai-wahine and murder of Tama-taku-tai ===
Rongomai-wahine was a very noble lady living at Tawapata on Māhia Peninsula, the daughter of Rapa. When Rongomai-wahine heard a comment that Hine-puariari had made after marrying Kahungunu: kāore hoki tērā te hanga o tāku tane, kāore e rūpeke mai ana, takoto noa mai te nuinga i waho ("the remarkable thing is that my husband's thing wouldn't fit! Most of it had to stay out!"), she said Nā te mea anō rā he kōpua pāpaku, mehemea e taka mai ana ki te kōpua hōhonu a Rapa e tuhera atu nei, pokopoko ana ia ki roto ("that's because it is a shallow pool; if it had fallen into the deep pool of Rapa now opening towards him, it would have been lost out of sight"). Kahungunu heard this as a challenge and travelled to Mahia, determined to marry her. In the meanwhile, however, Rongomai-wahine had married a local wood-carver, Tama-taku-tai.

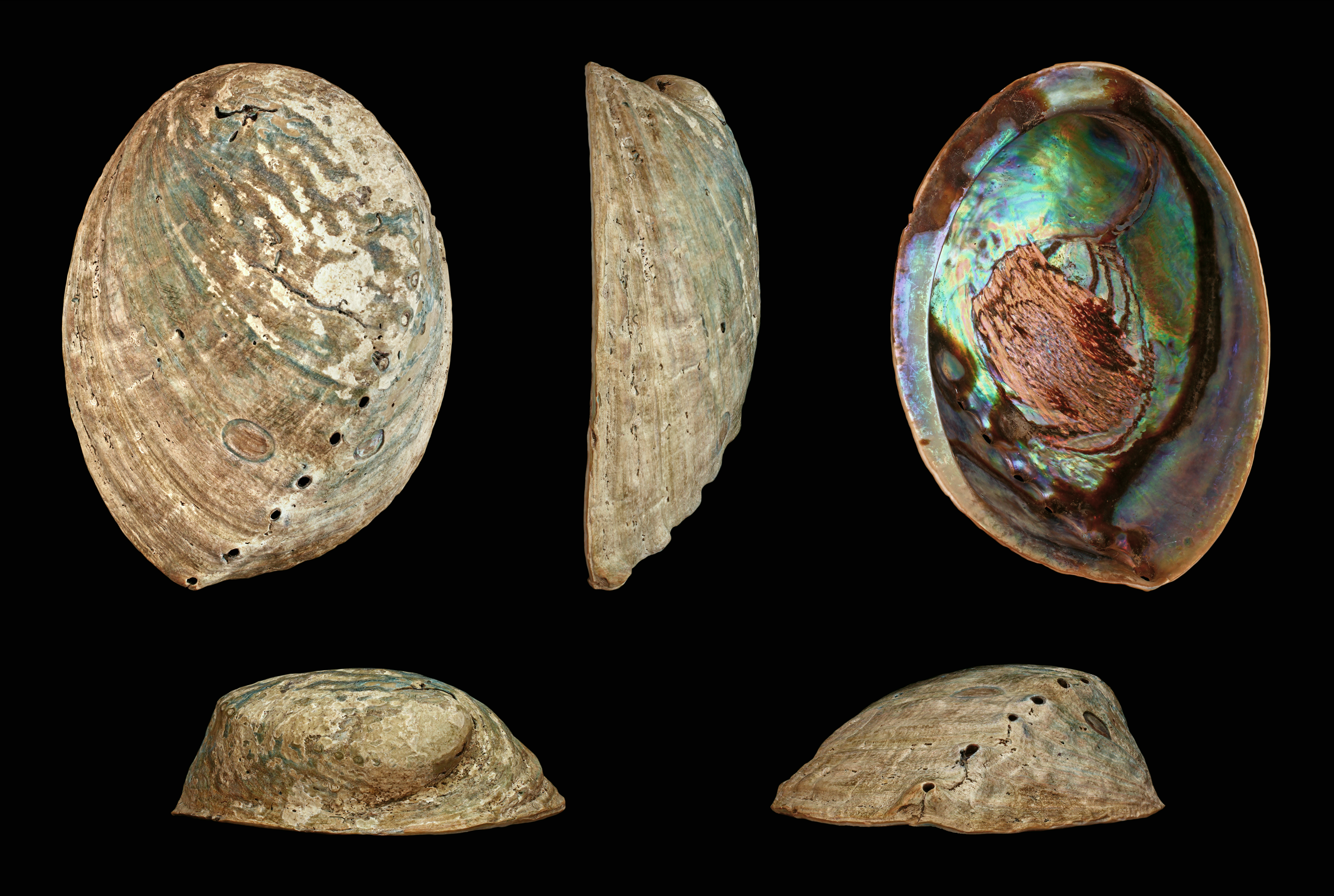
Pāua (Haliotis iris).

On arrival, Kahungunu demonstrated his prowess by leading an expedition to gather aruhe (fern root) in the hills. Once they had gathered a large amount, he tied it together in a huge bundle, using vines (aka turihanga) and carried the whole huge bundle by himself to the top of the cliffs above the village, and let it roll down the cliff "like a landslide," filling the whole village with aruhe. Next, he led an expedition to the sea to collect pāua (abalonie shellfish). He dove down underwater with a kāwhiu basket on the end of a rope, filling it repeatedly, while the other members of the expedition hauled it up, emptied it, and threw it back to him. Finally, he simply stuck the pāua to his body, and surfaced covered in the shellfish. At the feast, Kahungunu ate all of the roe of the pāua himself. This made him very flatulent; in the middle of the night he got up, went over to where Rongomai-wahine and Tama-taku-tai were sleeping and farted all over them. Rongomai-wahine woke up, blamed the smell on Tama-taku-tai and left him.

The next day, Kahungunu found Tama-taku-tai at the beach, practicing whakaheke ngaru (riding the breaking waves in his canoe, somewhat like surfing). He convinced Tama-taku-tai to let him join him in the canoe and intentionally capsized the boat, drowning Tama-taku-tai. Kahungunu went with Rongomai-wahine to a stream and asked her to wash his hair. When she tied his topknot (koukou) with local flax, it broke, so he gave her flax from his tātua pūpara (war belt), with which she was able to tie up his hair. He said, "here is the binding broad-leaved flax of Tamatea that was left at Tauranga," thereby revealing who he was. After this, they married.

Rongomai-wahine became pregnant and gave birth to a daughter. Kahungunu's father, Tamatea, set out from Ōpōtiki with gifts for the child, but heard that the girl was actually the child of Tama-taku-tai, so he threw away the gifts and turned around. As a result, the girl was named Hine-rauiri ("castaway girl"). Subsequently, Kahungunu and Rongomai-wahine had five children, three sons and two daughters.

=== Siege of Maunga-a-kāhia ===
Kahungunu settled at Maunga-a-kāhia on Māhia Peninsula, where remains of the huge earthwork fortifications are still visible. Around 1475, when Kahungunu was an old man, his nephews Tūtāmure and Tamataipūnoa led a force of five hundred men to attack Maunga-a-kāhia. During the assault, Kahungunu sent his daughter Tauhei-kurī out to find out how the fighting was going. She saw a man break his wooden mere (club) on the palisades and declare that "if only my weapon had been made of whalebone, it would have defeated Maunga-a-kāhia," at which another man gave him a whalebone mere. Tauhei-kurī interpreted this as an omen that defeat was imminent. Kahungunu sent her down to the frontlines again to find out who was leading the attack. When Kahungunu learnt that it was Tūtāmure, he called a ceasefire and sent Tauhei-kurī to marry him, in order to forge a peace. She agreed and went down to the camp, but when she was taken before Tūtāmure and Tamataipūnoa, she did not know which of them was which. Since Tamataipūnoa was more handsome, she sat before him repeatedly. Tūtāmure looked at his reflection in a pond, said "Oh! I am very ugly!" and allowed her to marry Tamataipūnoa, by whom she became the ancestor of the Te Aitanga-a-Māhaki iwi. The pond is known as Te Wai-whakaata o Tūtāmure (Tūtāmure's mirror). Kahungunu also gifted Tūtāmure a stone mere called Titingāpua.

=== Battle of Kai-whakareireia ===
Kahungunu's son Tuaiti had married Moetai daughter of Moeahu and settled at Rurutawhao at Aranui (near Frasertown). Tuaiti murdered his brother-in-law Te Rironga, so Moeahu and his son-in-law Rongo-whakaata attacked Rurutawhao and killed Tuaiti. The elderly Kahungunu went to Wairoa and got Wekanui to lead a war party to get revenge on Rongo-whakaata. At the Battle of Kai-whakareireia, Wekanui was victorious and captured a noblewoman named Pou-wharekura (a great-grand-niece of Kahungunu). Wekanui and Kahungunu's son, Kahukura-nui, both claimed Pou-wharekura. To avoid a conflict, Kahungunu married her himself. They had one daughter together.

== Family ==
Kahungunu had at least ten children by five women.

By his first wife Hinetapu he had 3 children:

- Tamateaiti
- Haruatai
- Poupoto

By Ruaretai, daughter of Ruapani he had one daughter:

- Ruahereheretieke

By Hine-puariari he had two children:

- Te Powhiri
- Another child, whose name is not recorded.

By Kahukura-waiaraia, daughter of Panui and Tokerau-tawhiri, who was a descendant of Hoturoa, captain of the Tainui and Ruawharo, priest of the Tākitimu, he had two sons:

- Tuaiti, who married Moetai daughter of Moeahu.

- Tutakawaewae, who married Houa:

- Hine-rangi, who married her cousin Tama-te-rangi.

- Potirohia

By Rongomaiwahine:

- Kahukuranui (son)
- Rongomai-papa (daughter), who married Ruapani and had a daughter:

- Ruarauhanga, who married Rākei-hikuroa and was the ancestor of the Te Hika a Ruarauhanga division of Ngāti Kahungunu.
Later, she remarried to Tuhourangi, son of Rangitihi of Te Arawa, and had a daughter:
- Maruhangaroa, who married Rakeiao (also a son of Rangitihi) and had two sons:

- Puhiawe
- Murimano

- Tamatea-kota (son), who married Rongo-kauae, daughter of Rongo-whakaata:

- Kahutapere, whose twin sons Tarakiuta and Tarakitai were murdered by Rākei-hikuroa or Tūpurupuru.
- Rākei-hakeke (son)

- Matangiora and Kokakore (twins)

- Rongomaikainoa, parent of Tahito Tarere, parent of Rakaipa, who married Takaha and was the mother of Hikawera I, father of Te Whatuiāpiti.

- Mahakinui (son), who married Tawake-Whakato and had no issue.
- Tauhei-kurī (daughter), who married Kahungunu's nephew Tama-taipunoa and had two sons:

- Tawhiwhi, who married Te Ahiwhakamauroa (granddaughter of Rongomaiwahine by her first husband).

- Hine-pua, who married Tama-konohi:

- Karakia-rau:

- Hikairo, ancestor of Ngāti Hikairo.

- Māhaki, ancestor of Te Aitanga-a-Māhaki.

By Pou-whare-kura, his great-grandniece, he had one daughter:

- Ruatapui, who married Ruatapunui:

- Kahuturi, who married Tupoho:

- Tu-rumakina (daughter), who married Rakaipaaka

Ancestors of Kahungunu

8. Tamatea Arikinui
4. Rongokako
9. Toto
2. Tamatea Pokai Whenua
10. Po Hurihanga
5. Muriwhenua
11. Maieke
1. Kahungunu
12. Iraatahu
6. Iraroa
13. Matiheraki
3. Iwipupu
14. Ueroa
7.Tokerau-wahine
15. Takotowaimua

== Commemoration ==
The marae and wharenui of Ngāti Rakaipaaka at Nūhaka are both named Kahungunu in honour of this ancestor. Kahungunu is the tiki carved on the koruru (gable) of the Takitimu wharenui at Waihīrere marae built at Wairoa in 1926. This location that is traditionally reserved for the chief ancestor honoured by the marae.

=== Sources ===
J. H. Mitchell notes that there are many different stories about Kahungunu's life. The version recorded by him and Thomas Lambert, Old Wairoa is largely based on an account from Pango-te-whare-auahi of Te Arawa, recorded by Percy Smith. Wananga Te Ariki also records the story of the Siege of Maunga-a-kāhia.

== Bibliography ==
- Pango-te-whare-auahi (1905). "Te Hekenga a Kagu-hunu / The Migration of Kahu-hunu". The Journal of the Polynesian Society. 14 (2(54)). Translated by Smith, Percy: 67–95. ISSN 0032-4000. JSTOR 20700750.
- Mitchell, J. H. (2014). Takitimu: A History of Ngati Kahungunu. Libro International. ISBN 978-1-877514-72-2.
- Parsons, Patrick (1997). WAI 400: The Ahuriri Block: Maori Cusomary Interests (PDF).
- Stafford, D.M. (1967). Te Arawa: A History of the Arawa People. Rotorua, New Zealand: A.H. & A.W. Reed.
- Walker, Wananga Te Ariki (27 January 2014). "The Siege of Maunga-a-kāhia". Nga Maunga Korero.
