= Tama Lakes =

Lakes in New Zealand

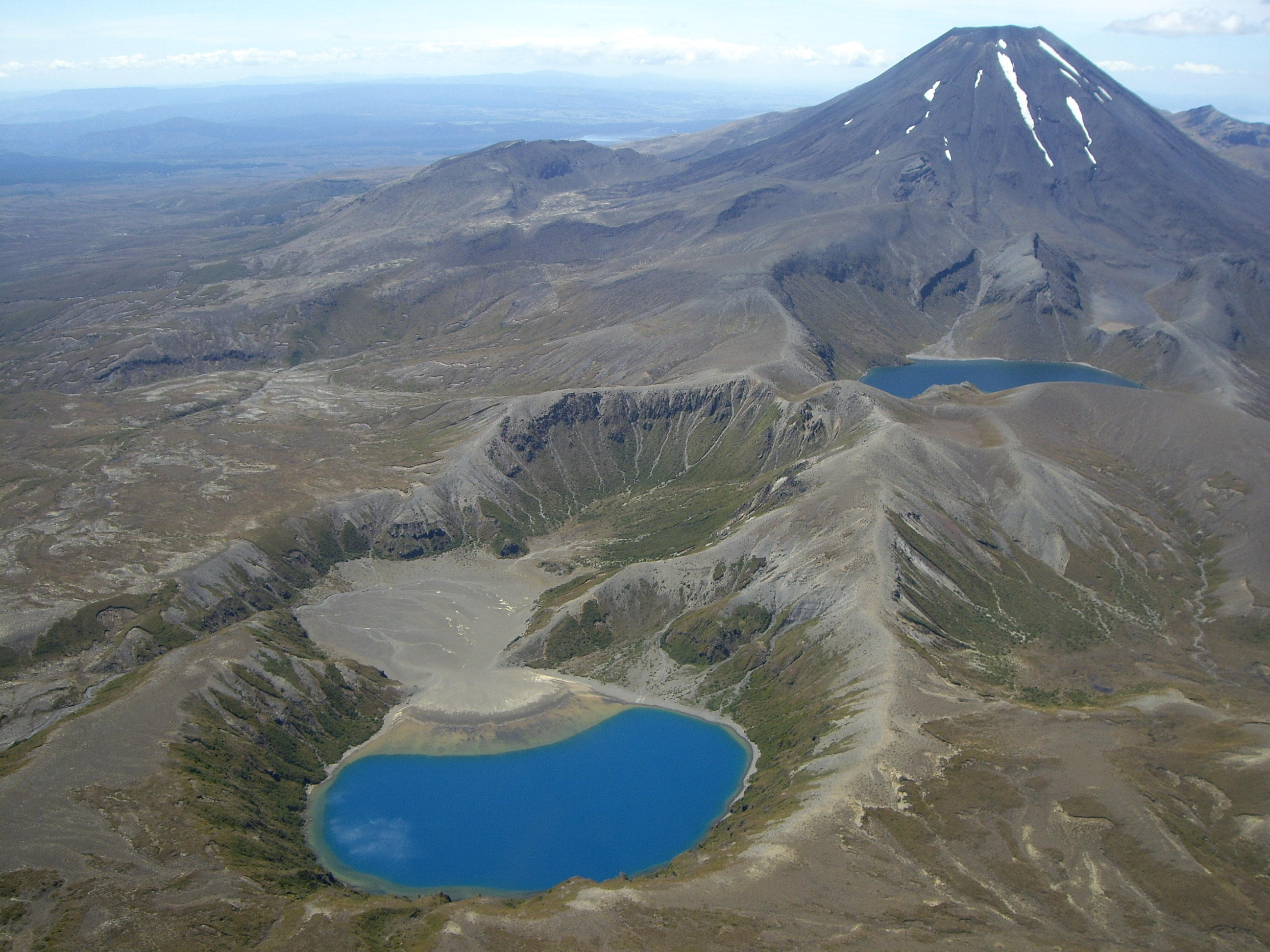
- Tama lakes between Mount Tongariro and Mount Ruapehu.
- Interactive map of Tama Lakes
- Coordinates: 39°12′S 175°37′E
- Surface elevation: 1,314 m (4,311 ft) (Upper Tama Lake)
- Map that shows Tama Lakes, outlined in red and relationship to the active Waihi fault zone also in red. Also shown are other Tongariro vents and cones or craters active in the last 15,000 years ( pale orange) with the Mount Ngauruhoe cone to north-west of the lakes. Vent areas are outlined in yellow. Other lakes in vents are outlined in blue. Clicking on the map enlarges it, and enables panning and mouseover of feature's name/wikilink and ages before present for wider volcanic context.

The Tama Lakes (Māori: Ngā puna a Tama) are two crater lakes in New Zealand's Tongariro National Park. They fill two (Upper and Lower Tama) of a series of explosion craters on the Tama Saddle between Mount Ruapehu and Mount Ngaruahoe (a main Mount Tongariro vent). Geologically the deep magma source and depth of basement are not usual for vents in the area.

== Hydrology ==
The lakes are assumed to have subsurface drainage towards the springs that source the Waihohonu Stream that flows into the Tongariro River as there are no outlet streams and even inlet streams are transient.

== Geology ==
In the region of the southern Tama Lakes of the southern Taupō Rift, the tens to hundreds of metre thick Tertiary greywacke basement is shallowest at approximately sea level, being somewhat higher under the volcanoes of Mount Ruapehu and Tongariro.

Lava exists nearby that has been dated to 275,000 years ago, the oldest that contributed to the present Mount Tongariro massive. The Waihi fault is believed to have facilitated dyke intrusions in the area.

The youngest tephra from the Tama Lakes vents is dated to about 11,000 years ago. This is the Wharepu tephra layer in the Mangamate tepra formation and started as phreatomagmatic eruptions but ended in a 0.16 ± 0.04 km^{3} (0.0384 ± 0.0096 cu mi) pyroclastic flow up to 7.5 km (4.7 mi) to the south-east of the lakes. This youngest eruption happened after 11,200 years and before 10,900 years before 1950, and produced a tephra volume of at least 0.63 km^{3} (0.15 cu mi). This eruption came by fast ascent from a deep magma reservoir at between 28 and 35 km (17 and 22 mi) depth unlike the much shallower depth of recent Mount Ngaruahoe eruptions.

The Tama lakes vents had often previously erupted at very similar times to other Tongariro vents during this very active period for them about 11,000 years ago. The Oturere member of the Mangamate formation was erupted over less than a month with the largest eruption being at the Tongagiro Half Cone vent, but at least three other tephra falls came from Tama Lakes area. At least one of the earlier Tama Lakes eruption columns collapsed generating another pyroclastic flow to the south-east of the lakes that was 0.03 ± 0.0075 km^{3} (0.0072 ± 0.0018 cu mi) in volume. The last eruption from a Tama Lakes area vent in this sequence was after the Half Cone vent was no loner active. Later after further activity at Half cone alone (Waihohonu member of the Mangamate formation) there was again paired activity with this vent by Tama lake area vent(s) over at least 2 months with evidence of explosive magma–groundwater interaction.

== See also ==
- List of volcanoes in New Zealand
