= Hine-te-Ariki =

Hine-te-Ariki was an ancestor of the Te Whānau a Taupara hapū of Te Aitanga-a-Māhaki iwi of the East Cape of New Zealand. She might have lived in the early sixteenth century.

== Life ==
Hine-te-Ariki was the daughter of Whana-Tuku-Rangi, through whom she was descended from Uri-Taniwha, supernatural creatures that lived in deep still areas of rivers. She married Tumokonui. With Tumokonui she had three pairs of twins, each of which carried off by spirits soon after she gave birth to them. Eventually she asked her father for advice and he revealed that the spirits were the Uri-Taniwha, who were offended by the fact that Tumokonui was not of chiefly descent. He told her that when she gave birth to her next child, the spirits would come in the form of mist and that she should cover the baby with her body until the mist dissipated. When she gave birth to her next child, a daughter, she did this and the child survived, receiving the name Tonoa-Ki-Aua, which means "I seek advice from someone." In adulthood, Tonoa-Ki-Aua married Whakauika, son of Taupara, and faced similar troubles conceiving a male child, because of her descent from the Uri-Taniwha, but eventually gave birth to Tama-i-uia.

After Tumokonui's death, Hine-te-Ariki disappeared into the Waikohu River, where she is said to have appeared to many of her descendants.

== Bibliography ==
- Mitchell, J. H. (2014). Takitimu: A History of Ngati Kahungunu. Libro International. ISBN 978-1-877514-72-2.
