= Māhaki =

Māori rangatira (chieftain)

Places in the life of Te Māhaki-a-tauhei
1 Pakarae
2 Pāwerawera
3 Pukepoto
4 Tūranga
5 Waerengaahika
6 Kaitaratahi ridge

Māhaki (fl. 1470s) was a Māori rangatira (chieftain) in the area north of modern Gisborne on the East Cape of New Zealand and the ancestor of the Te Aitanga-a-Māhaki iwi. He may have lived in the late fifteenth and early sixteenth centuries.

== Life ==
Māhaki was the son of Tamataipūnoa and Tauhei-kurī. Tamataipūnoa was a direct descendant of Toroa, captain of the Mātaatua canoe, while Tauhei-kurī was descended from Kahungunu and Tamatea Arikinui, captain of the Tākitimu, and Paikea. Around 1475, Tamataipūnoa accompanied his half-brother Tūtāmure on a raid to attack Maunga-a-kāhia, where Tauhei-kurī lived with her elderly father, Kahungunu. The latter brokered a peace which was to be sealed by the marriage of Tauhei-kurī and Tūtāmure. But when Tauhei-kurī was brought before Tūtāmure and Tamataipūnoa, she did not know which of them was which. Since Tamataipūnoa was more handsome, she sat before him repeatedly. Tūtāmure looked at his reflection in a pond, said "Oh! I am very ugly!" and allowed her to marry Tamataipūnoa. The pond is known as Te Wai-whakaata o Tūtāmure (Tūtāmure's mirror). Māhaki eventually named one of his sons Whakarauora-tanga-a-Tūtāmure ("Lives spared by Tūtāmure") in memory of this truce. Māhaki had an older brother, Tawhiwhi, and a younger one, Kahukuraiti. Tawhiwhi was killed and eaten when he was quite young.

Māhaki fell in love with and married his cousin Hinetapuarau, a great-granddaughter of Kahungunu. She had already been engaged to Hingānga, a descendant of Ruapani and Kahungunu, so the pair fled to Pakarae, where they were protected by Tamateakuku. Later they established their own pā (fortified village) called Pāwerawera at Waikohu (north of modern Gisborne).

=== Battle of Te Paepae o Rarotonga ===
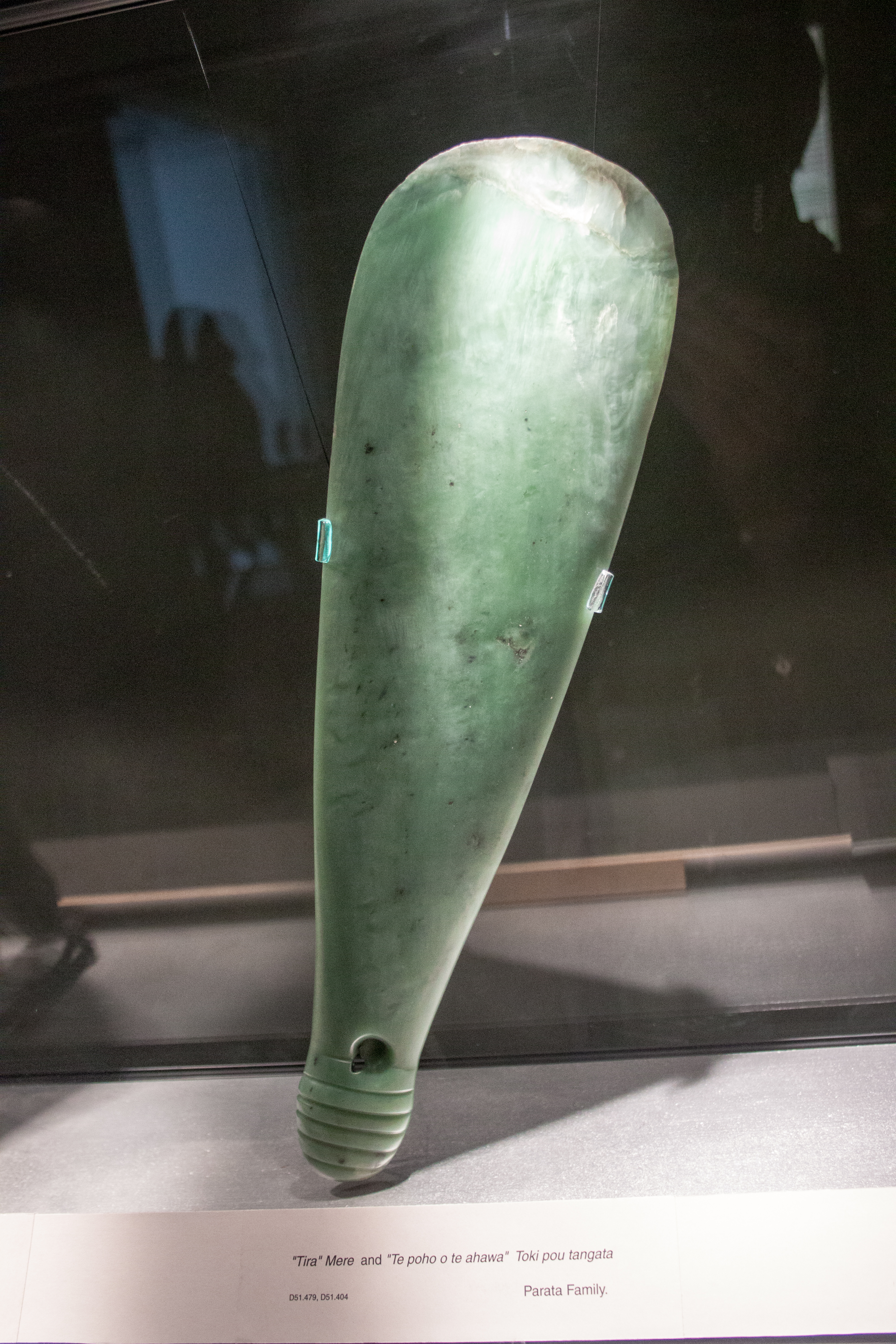
A pounamu patu (greenstone club), Otago Museum.

Māhaki's cousin Rākei-hikuroa sought to make his son Tūpurupuru the preeminent chieftain of the area. To achieve that, he or Tūpurupuru murdered the twin sons of Kahutapere, another cousin of Māhaki. Māhaki came to the aid of the latter, with his son Ranginui-a-Ihu. They attacked Tūpurupuru's advance party, killing its commander Pouarau and eating his heart, as normal for the mātāika (first casualty of a battle). Māhaki's youngest son, Whakarau, had been away hunting when the call to arms came and had therefore been left behind, but he found the stake that had been used for cooking Pouarau's heart (the kōhiku-manawa), tracked the war party to Pukepoto, made his way to the front line and killed Tūpurupuru with a spear strike to the throat, ending the conflict. After Whakarau had struck Tūpurupuru, Ranginui-a-Ihu attempted to strike Tūpurupuru, but Whakarau pushed him away with his taiaha, saying waiho te ika o te matau a te potiki a Hine-tapuarau kia kahakihaki ana ("leave alone the staggering fish on the hook of the last son of Hine-tapuarau"). Whakarau's descendants are called Ngā Pōtiki after this saying. In recognition of this deed, Kahutapere allowed Whakarau to marry his daughters, Pare and Kura.

Tūpurupuru's body was hung in a kahikatea tree, swinging over a stream, and Rākei-hikuroa tried but was unable to pull it down. The victors took turns throwing spears at it. Eventually, Māhaki and Ranginui-a-ihu stopped this desecration. Rākei-hikuroa gave Ranginui-a-ihu his pounamu patu (greenstone club), Ngawhakatangiura, and four cooking boulders in thanks for this.

After this Rākei-hikuroa and his people left the region. Māhaki received their land west of the Waipaoa River, which had previously been the demesne of Tūpurupuru and gave it to his sons Ranginui-a-Ihu and Whakarau.

=== Conflict with Rakaipaaka ===
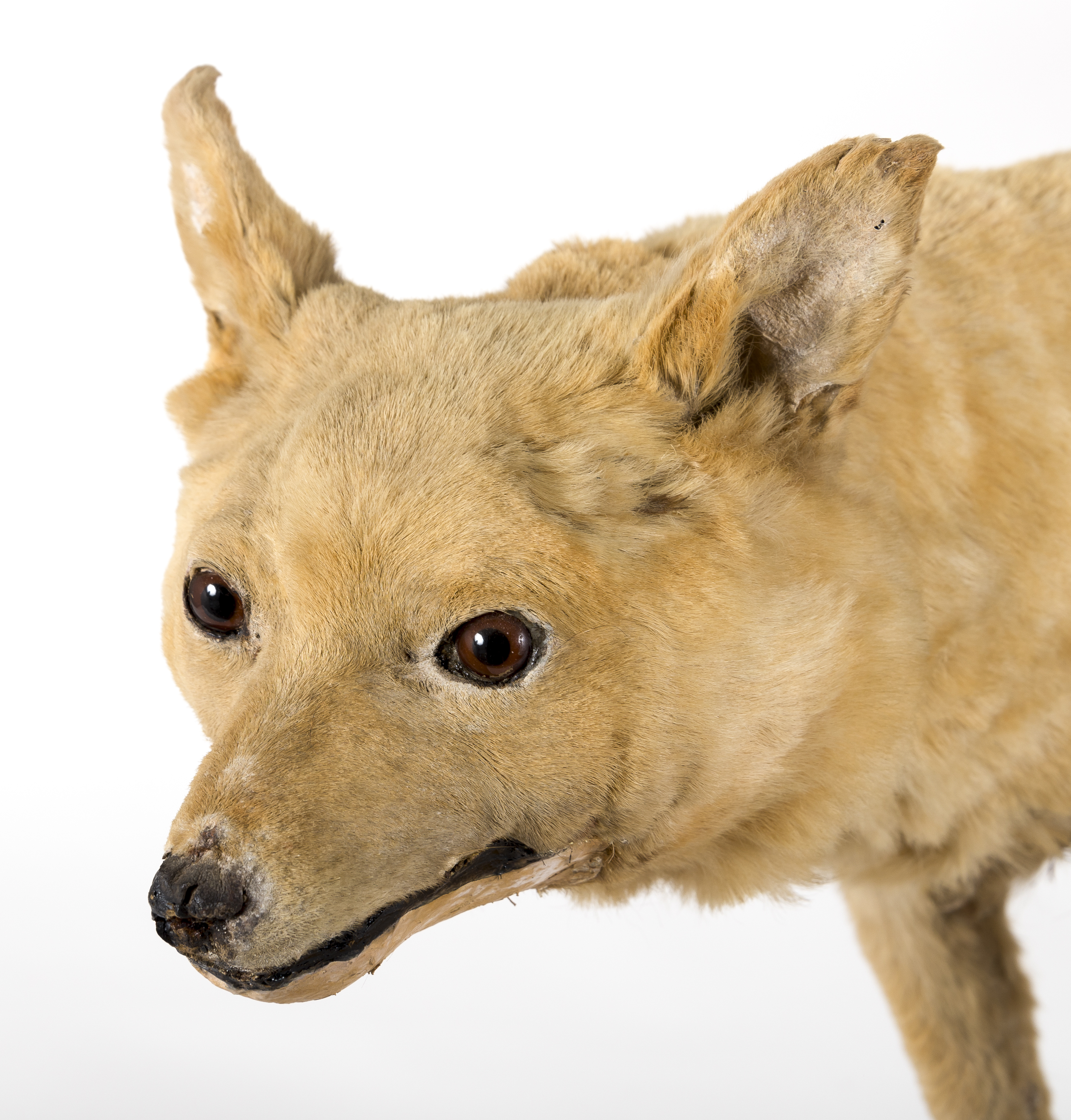
Kurī (Māori dog), Otago Museum

The east side of the river was held by Rākei-hikuroa's siblings, Rakaipaaka and Hinemanuhiri. One of Rakaipaaka's followers, Tupuho, slept with Māhaki's wife, Hinetapuarau. Later another follower killed and ate Kauere-huanui the kurī (dog) of Tu-te-kohi, the rangatira based at Tūranga (modern Gisborne). Desiring revenge, Tu-te-kohi convinced Māhaki to join him an attack on Rakaipaaka, along with the twins Rongomai-mihiao and Rongomai-wehea of Uawa (Tolaga Bay). Rongomai-mihiao and Rongomai-wehea attacked Rakaipaaka's village, Waerengaahika and drew him into a pursuit. When they reached Kaitaratahi ridge, Tu-te-kohi and Māhaki ambushed Rakaipaaka and his men from behind. Surrounded, they took heavy losses, but some of them escaped back to Waerengaahika. Tu-te-kohi then attacked Waerengaahika, defeated them again and drove them to Taumata-o-te-kai, at which point Māhaki brokered a peace agreement, according to which Rakaipaaka and Hinemanuhiri had to go into exile. Māhaki received their land on the east side of the Waipaoa River, thus gaining control of all the land that had once belonged to the great chief Ruapani.

== Family ==
Māhaki and Hinetapuarau had five children:

- Rakai-te-awe (daughter)
- Ihu or Ranginui-a-Ihu (son), married Te Nonoikura

- Whakauaki (son)
- Taupara (son), married Puha-i-terangi and became ancestor of Te Whanau a Taupara

- Whakauika (son), married Tonoa-Ki-Aua, daughter of Hine-te-Ariki:

- Pikihoro (daughter)
- Hine-uru (daughter)
- Tama-i-uia (son)

- Kaikoreaunei (son), married Whareana and Te Haaki and became ancestor of Te Whanau a Kai.
- Tauwheoro (daughter), married Iwipuru and became ancestor of Te Whanau a Iwi

- Hikarongo (son), married Tukorako and became ancestor of Ngāti Hikarongo
- Rakaiaotea (daughter)
- Whakarau-ora-tanga-a-Tūtāmure (son or grandson), ancestor of Ngā Pōtiki

== Commemoration ==
Māhaki is the ancestor and namesake of the Te Aitanga-a-Māhaki iwi, which remains settled in the East Cape area. One of the pou (posts) in the Whare Whakairo of the Māngatu Blocks corporation depicts Māhaki with his son Hikarongo. Other pou depict Ranginui-a-Ihu and Whakarau. At Parihimanihi, the wharenui (meeting house) is named Te Poho o Mahaki and the wharekai (dining hall) Te Kura o Mahaki in Māhaki's honour.

== Bibliography ==
- Mitchell, J. H. (2014). Takitimu: A History of Ngati Kahungunu. Libro International. ISBN 978-1-877514-72-2.
- Parsons, Patrick (1997). WAI 400: The Ahuriri Block: Maori Cusomary Interests (PDF).
- Te Waitohioterangi, Tanith Wirihana (2020). "Tupurupuru and the Murder of the top [spinning] twins". Nga Korero. (an account of the conflict between Rākei-hikuroa and Kahutapere transmitted from Hiraina Riria Pere, Hetekia Te Kani Pere II, and Hiraina Hinetoko).
- Mangatu. "The Carvings". Mangatu Blocks Incorporation.
