= Ōingo Lake =

Lake in New Zealand

- Location within North Island
- Location: Hastings, North Island
- Coordinates: 39.5625°S 176.7493°E
- Basin countries: New Zealand
- Max. length: 2.14 km (1.33 mi)
- Max. width: 540 m (1,770 ft)
- Surface area: 0.81 km (0.50 mi)
- Max. depth: 5 m (16 ft)
- Shore length^{1}: 5.6 km (3.5 mi)
- ^{1} Shore length is not a well-defined measure.

Ōingo Lake is one of several small lakes (the other including Runanga Lake and Potaka Lake) located northwest to the city of Hastings in the Hawke's Bay Region of the eastern North Island of New Zealand.
