= Poupou =

Wall carving in a Māori wharenui

A poupou is a wall panel located underneath the verandah of a Māori wharenui (meeting house). It is generally built to represent the spiritual connection between the iwi and their ancestors, and thus each poupou is carved with emblems of the tohunga whakairo's (carver's) particular lineage. Poupou may also be decorated with representations of the tribe's ancestral history, legends, and migration stories to New Zealand. As such, each wharenui, and by extension the poupou, is thus treated with the utmost respect, as if it were an ancestor.

== Tohunga whakairo (carver) ==
For Māori the ability to carve wooden crafts is both a spiritual and intellectual endeavour.

The tohunga whakairo had to be well versed in his tribal lineage and history to carve something that was commemorative of his ancestors. At the same time particularly amongst the traditionalists, he had to be cognizant of the proper protocols. For example, in traditional times, the tohunga whakairo never blew the shavings of his work or the ancestors would curse the piece. In other instances, if he allowed women or food near his work the mana (spiritual power) would be destroyed.

In the contemporary period Māori carvers have struggled to maintain the same traditional protocol in a state that has become increasingly Westernised. As a result, today, many Māori have made an attempt to resurge traditional patterns and carvings within mainstream art through programs like the Māori Arts and Crafts Institute. They have made it their mission to preserve traditional toi whakairo, and have opened various programs and classes to pass their traditions to younger generations.

== Styles ==
According to Sidney Mead’s The Art of Carving, there are three classical styles typically used in Māori carvings:

=== Taranaki ===
- Vigorous serpentine figures
- Pointed heads
- Rigged bodies
- Small mouths

=== North Auckland ===
- Simplicity
- Clean lines
- Round heads
- Use of unaunahi (half moon)
- Claw like fingers

=== Hauraki ===
- Emphasis on human figure
- Rigged body
- Use of many figures of differing sizes-largest in the centre

== The poupou at the Royal Ontario Museum ==
The poupou at the Royal Ontario Museum was made in the nineteenth century. It was built in the style of the Te Āti Awa people of the North Island of New Zealand. It has a dark brown complexion rather than the traditional black, white and red pigments.

It is currently being displayed in the Oceania exhibit on the third floor of the Royal Ontario Museum. It is housed amongst various other Polynesian, Micronesian, and Australian indigenous artefacts like tapa or siapo cloths and Polynesian weaponry.
