= Thomas Lambert (horticulturist) =

New Zealand doctor, horticulturist, journalist

Thomas Lambert (3 December 1854 – 17 April 1944) was a New Zealand medical doctor, horticulturist, journalist and writer. He was born in Oughterard, County Galway in Ireland on 3 December 1854.

== Background ==
Lambert was born in Oughterard, County Galway, to schoolmaster William Lambert, and former schoolteacher, Mary Jane Bingham. He was their eldest child. His father was a graduate of Trinity College, Dublin, and taught his son the classics. He studied medical training at St. Vincent's Hospital, Dublin, for eighteen months as a surgeon, becoming skilled at obstetrics, dressing wounds, and setting bones. During his time at St. Vincent's he published articles in the London Medical Press and Circular.

== Emigration to New Zealand ==
Before he could complete his training, Lambert's family moved to New Zealand, arriving on 4 October 1875 at Spit, Wairoa, where William Lambert was appointed the first Anglican clergyman. Mary Jane Lambert was forced to make home in a two-room whare with a dirt floor, where she previously had a large house with four indoor servants.

The Lamberts founded a tree nursery and Wairoa's first chemist shop. Thomas became the de facto medical practitioner, treating both Māori and Pākehā. In 1876, he became the local correspondent for a number of newspapers based in Hawke's Bay. In time he was appointed as editor of the Wairoa Free Press, Wairoa Guardian and East Coast Mail and Wairoa Gazette, served on several local committees, and was a regular activist for the Presbyterian church and the temperance movement. He also found time to judge at horticultural shows.

Thomas Lambert married Jessie Shears in Napier on 7 April 1886, with whom he had nine children (two were to die in infancy).

== Wairoa railway and other interests ==
From 1896, Lambert agitated for a rail link connecting Wairoa to the rest of the east coast. Travel was otherwise difficult and the future of the town was at stake. However, the railway was not completed until 1939.

Lambert became so interested in the history of the Māori of Wairoa that he became a fluent speaker, a trusted interpreter, and explorer of the district. The Māori called him Tame Ramepata. In 1925, he published The story of old Wairoa and the East Coast district, of some eight hundred pages. This was followed with Pioneering reminiscences of old Wairoa in 1936.

== Later life ==
William Lambert died in 1907, leaving Thomas the sole support of his mother and sisters, as well as having to provide for his own large family. He built a handsome house and remained in Wairoa, declining offers of employment elsewhere. In his 60 years of journalism and editing Lambert regularly attended Wairoa County Council meetings. He was widely respected for his astute and fair reporting for local and national newspapers, his enthusiastic advocacy of any projects likely to boost the town or the district, and his fairness, humour and friendliness. He retired in 1938 at the age of 84, but continued writing and gardening until his death, aged 89, on 17 April 1944 at Wairoa. He was survived by his wife, Jessie, and six daughters.
