= Rūnanga Lake =

Lake on the North Island of New Zealand

- Location within North Island
- Location: Hawke's Bay, North Island
- Coordinates: 39.5786°S 176.7053°E
- Basin countries: New Zealand
- Max. length: 3.27 km (2.03 mi)
- Max. width: 620 m (2,030 ft)
- Surface area: 1.06 km (0.66 mi)
- Shore length^{1}: 9.30 km (5.78 mi)
- Surface elevation: 30 m (98 ft)
- Islands: 1
- ^{1} Shore length is not a well-defined measure.

Rūnanga Lake is one of several small lakes (the others including Ōingo Lake and Potaka Lake) located to the northwest of the city of Hastings in the Hawke's Bay Region of the eastern North Island of New Zealand. Water from the lake flows into the Ngaruroro River.
