= Ngaherehere =

Māori rangatira (c. eighteenth century)

Ngaherehere was a Māori rangatira in the upper Wairoa River valley in the Hawke's Bay region of New Zealand. He probably lived around the eighteenth century.

== Life ==
In his account of the history of Ngāti Kahungunu, J. H. Mitchell expresses uncertainty about Ngaherehere's origins, but says that he came from Mahia peninsula or Whakaki. His parents were Kopura, through whom he was descended from Kahungunu, and Tahu-raumea, through whom he was descended from Tahu Pōtiki.

=== Arrival in Wairoa ===
Ngaherehere came into the Wairoa river valley and settled at Matiti (across the river from Ruataniwha pā). Tapuwae Poharutanga o Tukutuku of Ngāi Tamaterangi, who was the main chief in the area, led a force to chase him off. Ngaherehere relocated upriver to Awamate; this time, Tapuwae came out and lit a fire nearby. This signified that Awamate belonged to him and Ngaherehere therefore moved on again, until him came to Marumaru, where he established a pā called Te Rapu ("seeking a place") and a plantation garden called Tahapaua.

=== Battle of Wharekopae ===
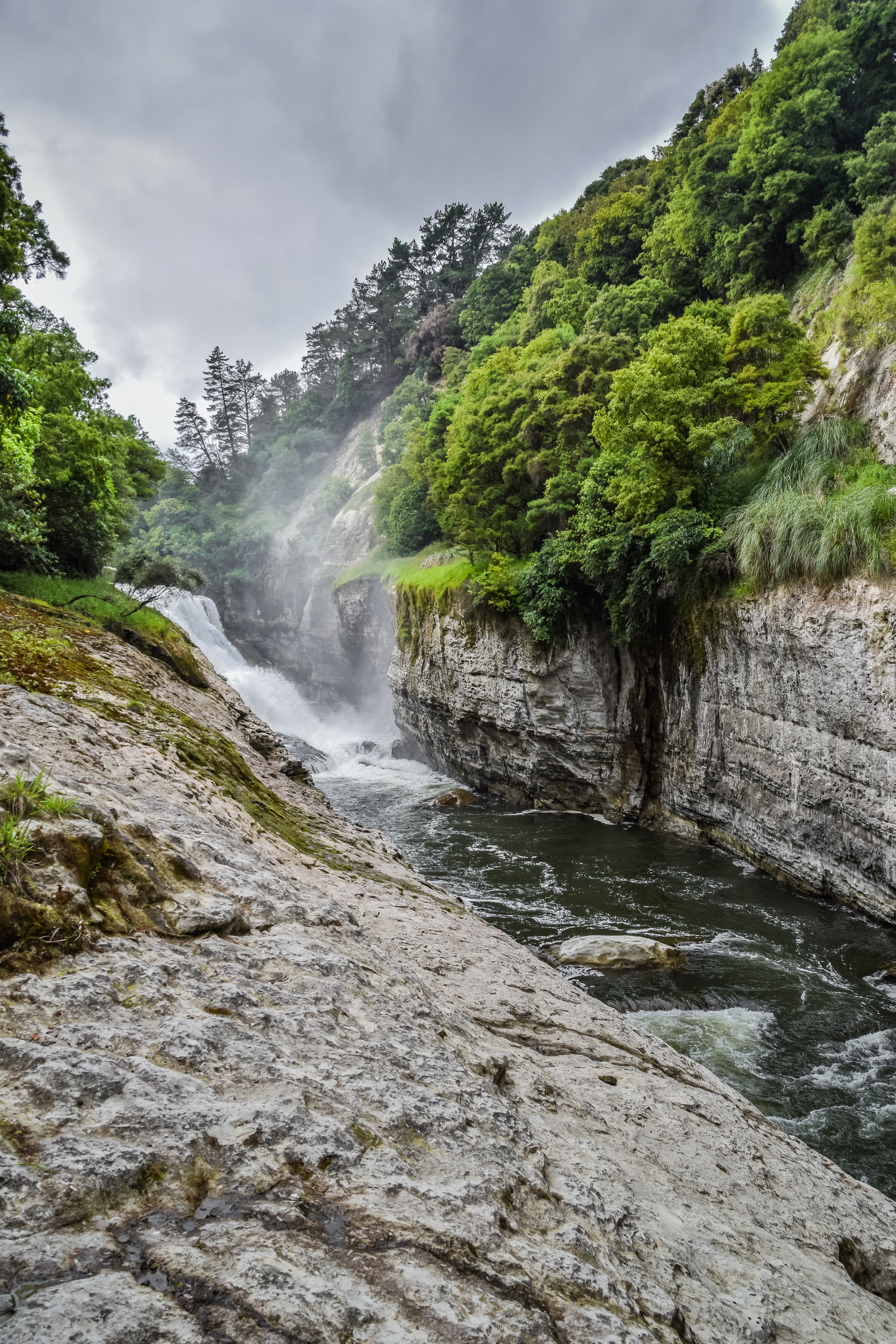
Te Reinga Falls.

Wharekopae was a pā upriver from Te Rapu, above Te Reinga Falls, where the Ruakituri and Hangaroa Rivers come together to form the Wairoa. It had two leading chiefs, Tutaki and Puraho, who each controlled one end of the settlement. They quarrelled over an eel pond and Tutaki was killed.

Tutaki's son, Tamaroki, secretly sought vengeance for his father's death. He went downriver to seek a powerful ally to help him, passing Ngaherehere's pā without stopping because he considered him too weak. However, his intended ally, Te Whakahu, refused to intervene in an argument that had nothing to do with him. Returning in failure, Tamaroki stopped at Te Rapu and asked Ngaherehere for help. His response, ha! haere ake nei, hoki mai nei, a, peka mai nei ("What! going past; returning, and then calling here!") is proverbial. But Ngaherehere agreed to help because Tamaroki had gifted him food several times before this.

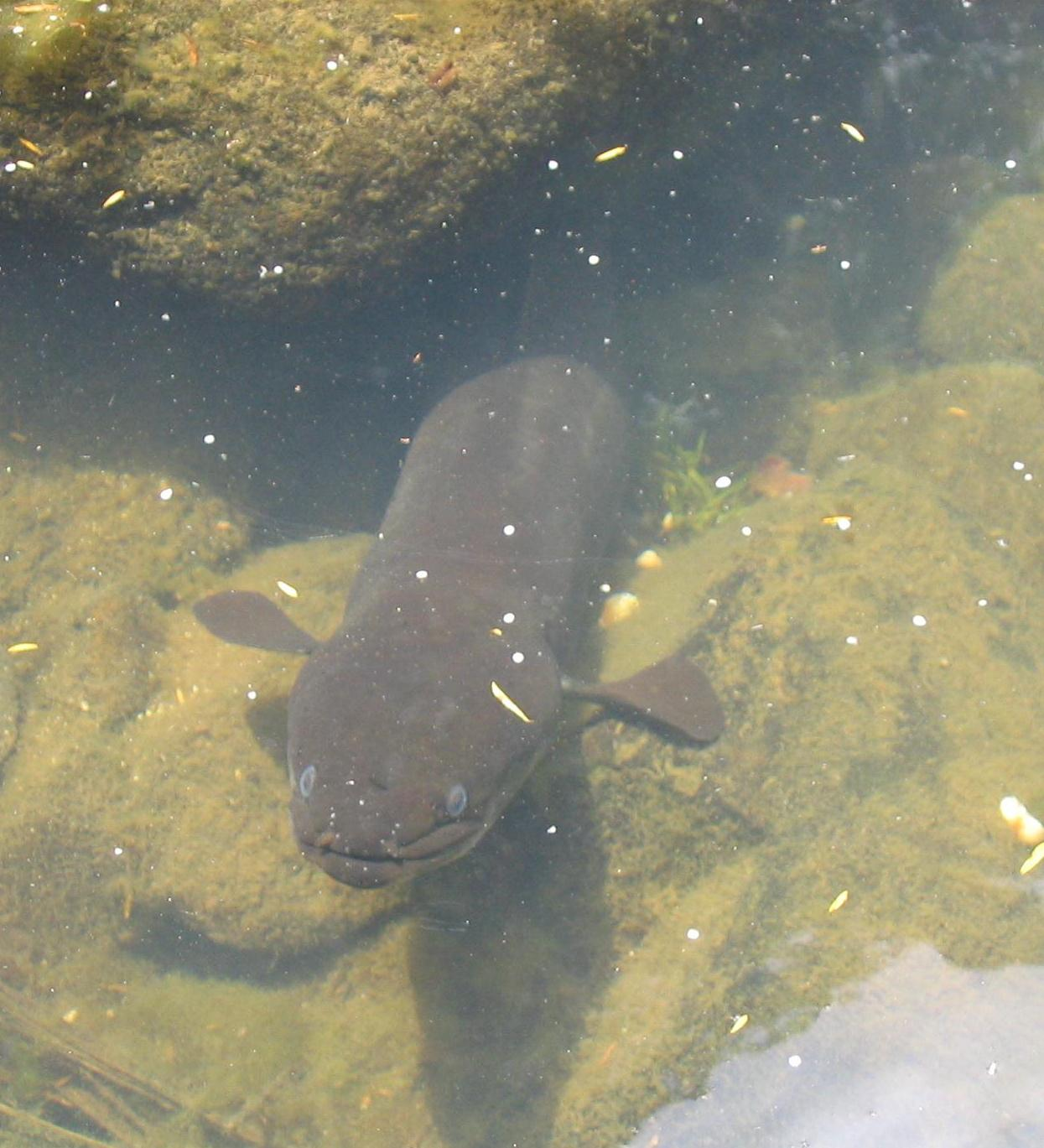
A New Zealand longfin eel (tuna).

Tamaroki convinced all the inhabitants of Wharekopae to undertake a nighttime expedition to capture New Zealand longfin eel (tuna), splitting Puraho's people into two groups that headed up the Ruakituri and Hangaroa rivers, while his people headed downriver. He set up great fires so that when Puraho's people returned they would feast and fall asleep.

Ngaherehere assigned a neighbouring chief, Whetete, to protect his fields from pūkeko and rendezvoused with Tamaroki in the night. Ngaherehere made the proverbial remark ka moe te mata hii tuna, ka ara te mata hii taua ("the eyes of the eel hunters are closed; the eyes of the man hunters are open"). Shortly before dawn, he launched his attack, capturing the pā and slaughtering almost all of Puraho's people. Puraho himself escaped with a small coterie, fleeing towards the Te Arai River. Ngaherehere pursued, and captured a woman, Hopu-ara, on a hill near Tiniroto, whom he spared and married.

After this battle, Wharekopae and Tamaroki's people came under Ngaherehere's authority. They launched several raids against Puraho's people at Te Arai.

== Family ==
Ngaherehere married Rurea before he came to Wairoa and had six sons with her, including:

- Wai-o-tuawatea
- Torere
- Parua
- Pakura

Ngaherehere married a lady whom he captured at the Battle of Wharekopae, whom he dubbed Hopu-ara ("caught on the tracks").

As a third wife, Ngaherehere married Tiringa.

Finally, he married Hine-te-urunga. Their descendants are Ngai Te Aweawe.

== Bibliography ==
- Mitchell, J. H. (2014). Takitimu: A History of Ngati Kahungunu. Libro International. ISBN 978-1-877514-72-2.
