= State Highway 38 (New Zealand) =

Road in New Zealand

State Highway 38

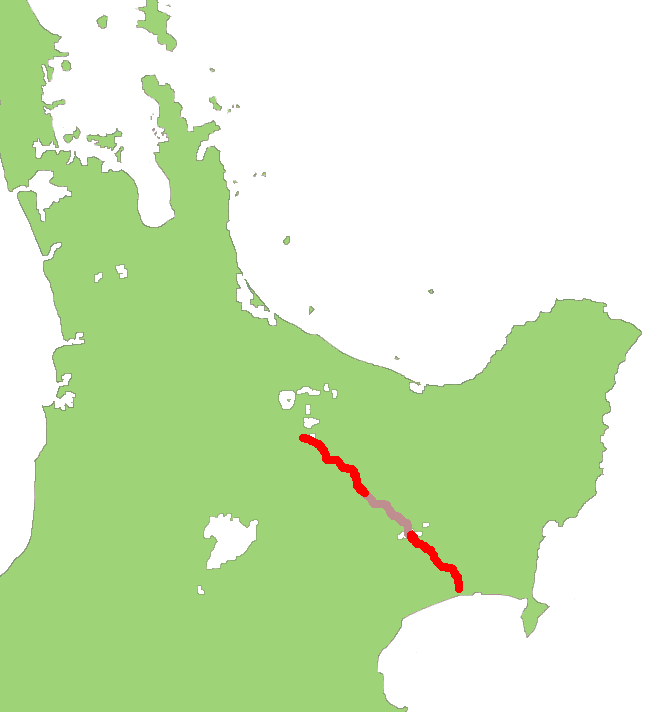

Route information
- Maintained by NZ Transport Agency Waka Kotahi
- Length: 120.3 km (74.8 mi)

Waiotapu—Murupara section
- Length: 36.4 km (22.6 mi)
- West end: SH 5 at Waiotapu
- East end: Rangitaiki River at Murupara

Āniwaniwa—Wairoa section
- Length: 63.9 km (39.7 mi)
- North end: Āniwaniwa Stream at Āniwaniwa
- South end: SH 2 (Bridge Street) at Wairoa

Location
- Country: New Zealand

Highway system
- New Zealand state highways; Motorways and expressways; List
← SH 37	→ SH 39

State Highway 38 (SH 38) is a road in the North Island of New Zealand that starts from SH 5 near Waiotapu, and ends at Wairoa, where it connects to SH 2. It is the shortest connection from the central North Island (Rotorua) to the East Coast (Gisborne), but it is not often used as such. Large parts of the road are narrow and winding, and about 74 kilometres (46 mi) of the road is unsealed. Travel on this highway takes roughly four hours.

Part of this unsealed section (between Te Whaiti and Aniwaniwa) is not designated a state highway and instead holds the names Ruatahuna Road and Waikaremoana Road. The administration of this middle section of highway is split between Whakatane District and Wairoa District Councils. NZTA still maintains control over the road and, in 2017, was working on a business case for tar sealing.

Circa 1990, the length of SH 38 was 198 km from Wairoa to Waiotapu before the middle section designation was revoked. Due to its narrow and twisty nature, trucks are not permitted to tow heavy trailers on the unsealed section of the route.

== Route ==
Starting at the intersection with SH 5, one drives through the Kaingaroa Forest and after 38 km the small town of Murupara is passed; at this point, the road temporarily loses its state highway status. At km 44, at Te Whaiti, a road branches to Minginui, leading into Whirinaki Te Pua-a-Tāne Conservation Park. The highway travels south-east for a further 20 km past the settlement of Ruatāhuna, and passes entirely through forested mountains. The next 74 km are unsealed and climb through Te Urewera, following small streams to reach the shores of Lake Waikaremoana. At km 134, at Aniwaniwa, is a visitor centre operated by the Department of Conservation where several different walks start, including a short stroll to the Āniwaniwa Falls. At the southern end of the lake, at Onepoto, is a motorcamp. Further south, along the Waikaretaheke River, the three power stations of the Waikaremoana Power Scheme can be seen.

From Aniwaniwa the road regains its state highway status and enters the valley of the Waiau River, where the seal restarts. At km 185, at the village of Frasertown, where the Waiau River joins the Wairoa River, the Tiniroto Road branches off to Gisborne (another 97 km). At km 195, at Wairoa, the road finally terminates on SH 2 at the intersection of Mahia Avenue and Bridge Street.

== Opposition to sealing ==
In 2019, the New Zealand Government intended to seal 10 km of this road, having developed a Provincial Growth Fund to do so. However, the iwi Ngāi Tūhoe opposed the proposal, saying that the project, which would extend into their territory, would damage the environment. Tūhoe were already concerned about environmental impacts to the region due to the rise in tourism. In response, the Minister for Regional Economic Development Shane Jones described Tūhoe as having "hillbilly thinking".

== Major intersections ==
Territorial authority	Location	km	mi	Exit	Name	Destinations	Notes
Rotorua Lakes	Waimangu					SH 5 north – Rotorua; SH 5 south – Taupō	SH 38 begins
Rotorua Lakes	Rerewhakaaitu					Rerewhakaaitu Road – Rerewhakaaitu	
Rotorua Lakes	Kaingaroa Forest					Dun Road – Kaingaroa Village	
Whakatane	Murupara					Kopuriki Road – Whakātane	
Whakatane	Murupara					Pine Drive – Town Centre	
Whakatane	Murupara					Ngatimanawa Road	SH 38 stops
Wairoa	Āniwaniwa					Aniwaniwa Road	SH 38 resumes
Wairoa	Tuai					Tuai Main Road – Tuai Hydro	
Wairoa	Frasertown					Tiniroto Road – Te Reinga, Tiniroto	Formerly SH 36
Wairoa	Wairoa					SH 2 north – Mahia, Gisborne; SH 2 south – Napier, Wairoa	SH 38 ends
