= Tapuwae Poharutanga o Tukutuku =

Māori upoko ariki (head chieftain)

Tapuwae Poharutanga o Tukutuku was a Māori upoko ariki (head chieftain) of the Ngāti Kahungunu iwi and Ngāi Tamaterangi hapū in the Wairoa area of Hawke Bay of New Zealand. He developed a fierce rivalry with his brother, Te Maaha, and as a result, their father, Te Okuratawhiti, split the Wairoa River valley between them, giving Tapuwae the eastern bank. The brothers are said to continue their rivalry as a pair of taniwha at the river's mouth. Tapuwae established eight pā (fortified villages) along the river, which he split between his two wives, Te Rauhina and Ruataumata. Later, he led a war party to Tologa Bay to get revenge for the murder of his great-grandfather Tama-te-rangi. Mostly, however, he was a man of peace. In his later life, he exercised great forbearance when his position was challenged by two tohunga Manawa and Kowhaki and treated the visiting chief Taharakau in a generous and friendly manner.

== Life ==
Tapuwae was born in the pā of Te Whatakoau at Taumata o Hinepehinga, near Whakamahi, to Te Okuratawhiti and Hinepehinga. Through both of his parents, he was a descendant of Ruapani and Kahungunu, and thence from Pawa and Kiwa who captained the Horouta waka and Tamatea Arikinui, who captained the Takitimu. His mother, Hinepehinga had originally been married to Te Okuratawhiti's brother Tukutuku, but he was killed by Parua in the swamp at Te Poti on the east side of the Wairoa River mouth, while he was trying to avenge the murder of his grandfather Tama-te-rangi. The name Tapuwae Poharutanga o Tukutuku, which means "the bogged feet of Tukutuku" referred to this event. Tapuwae had an older half-sister, Hine-awhi, and a younger full brother, Te Maaha. Tapuwae's maternal grandfather, Kotore had also been killed in battle, by Apanui, founder of Te Whānau-ā-Apanui.

=== Rivalry with Te Maaha ===
From childhood, Tapuwae and Te Maaha were bitter rivals. One day they went to Whakamahia beach to practice building a fortress out of sand. They quarrelled over which of them should design it, so turned it into a competition to see who could build their sand castle most quickly. Te Māha finished first and Tapuwae angrily smashed his sand castle. The two fought and it became clear that they would not be able to coexist.

Therefore, when they grew up, Te Okuratawhiti took the two of them to the village of Rangihoua, on the west side of the Wairoa River mouth and divided the river valley between them, ordering Te Māha to cross over to the eastern bank and Tapuwae to stay on the western bank, and telling each of them to "never show your shadow" on the other side. The east bank of the river was thereafter known as Te ari a Te Maaha and the west bank as Te ari a Tapuwae. The descendants of the brothers were rivals for several generations. The shifting of the western and eastern sandbars at the Wairoa river mouth is said to be caused by Tapuwae and Ta Maaha continuing their rivalry as taniwha inhabiting opposite sides of the river.

=== Pā of Tapuwae ===
The pā of Tapuwae
1 Rangihoua
2 Motu o te Rauhina
3 Kaimango
4 Manukanui
5 Pohonui o hine
6 Pohoriaka
7 Hikukoekoea
8 Omaruhakeke

After this division of territory, Tapuwae took two wives: Te Rauhina and Ruataumata. Te Rauhina was known as Te Wahine korero āio a Tapuwae ("the peace-talking wife of Tapuwae), because she always supported a peaceful course of action and ensured the protection of any supplicants who arrived in her villages. By contrast, Te Ruataumata was called Te Wahine kai-tangata a Tapuwae ("the man-eating wife of Tapuwae") because she engaged in cannibalism Tapuwae maintained eight pā along the Wairoa for his family. The southern four belonged Te Rauhina and her children and the northern four for Ruataumata and hers:

1. Rangihoua, later known as Pilot Hill, located at the river mouth. As of 1947, part of this pā had been destroyed by the sea, but some remains were still visible.
2. Motu o te Rauhina, an island ca. 1.2 km upriver from the mouth, which was a centre for fishing. It has washed away, but as of 1947, remains were visible underwater.
3. Kaimango, located at the bend of the river, later known as Spooners point, which was site of Wairoa's first courthouse, hotel, and general store.
4. Manukanui, subsequently the site of the Wairoa post office (destroyed in the 1931 Hawke's Bay earthquake), which was named Tapuwae in honour of this history.
5. Pohonui o hine, later moved to the east bank of the river and renamed as Whereinga by Te Kapuamatatoru.
6. Pohoriaka, located at Hikawai, just south of Te Mira (the first flour mill built on the Wairoa River).
7. Hikukoekoea, where the Kauhouroa stream flows into the Wairoa.
8. Omaruhakeke, near Marumaru, where Tapuwae and Te Ruataumata's grandfather Kotore had been killed.

=== Avenging Tama-te-rangi ===
Tapuwae decided to get revenge on the descendants of Parua, who were living at Tologa Bay, for the deaths of his great-grandfather Tama-te-rangi and his uncle Tukutuku. As an ally he recruited one Te Whakahu. Tapuwae's war party travelled past Tiniroto and met up with Te Whakahu's forces at Waerenga o kuri, near the Te Ārai River. When he met Te Whakahu, he was surprised by his ugliness and said inā tonu te āhua o te tangata hei tuku i a tatau ki te pō ("what a strange kind of man to lead us to destruction!"). Te Whakahu did not react, but when they reached a fork in the path, which led to two different settlements held by Parua's descendants, Te Whakahu chose the opposite one from Tapuwae, saying haere koe te atahua, waiho ake te tangata weriweri kia haere ki te pō ("go, you handsome man, and leave this ugly man to go to destruction"). The place is named Te Kaikape ("the separation") in memory of this event.

The two forces therefore attacked both fortresses simultaneously. Te Whakahu took the one he attacked very quickly, but Tapuwae met strong resistance at Ohaoko and was almost defeated, when Te Whakahu and his force arrived and took the fortress. Two important local chiefs were killed. Tapuwae declared this sufficient vengeance and returned home.

=== Arrival of Ngaherehere ===
At some point, Ngaherehere came into the Wairoa river valley and settled at Matiti (across the river from Ruataniwha pā). Tapuwae led a force to chase him off. Ngaherehere relocated upriver to Awamate; this time, Tapuwae came out and lit a fire nearby. This signified that Awamate belonged to him and Ngaherehere therefore moved on again, until him came to Marumaru, where he established a pā called Te Rapu ("seeking a place").

=== Challenge of Manawa and Kowhaki ===
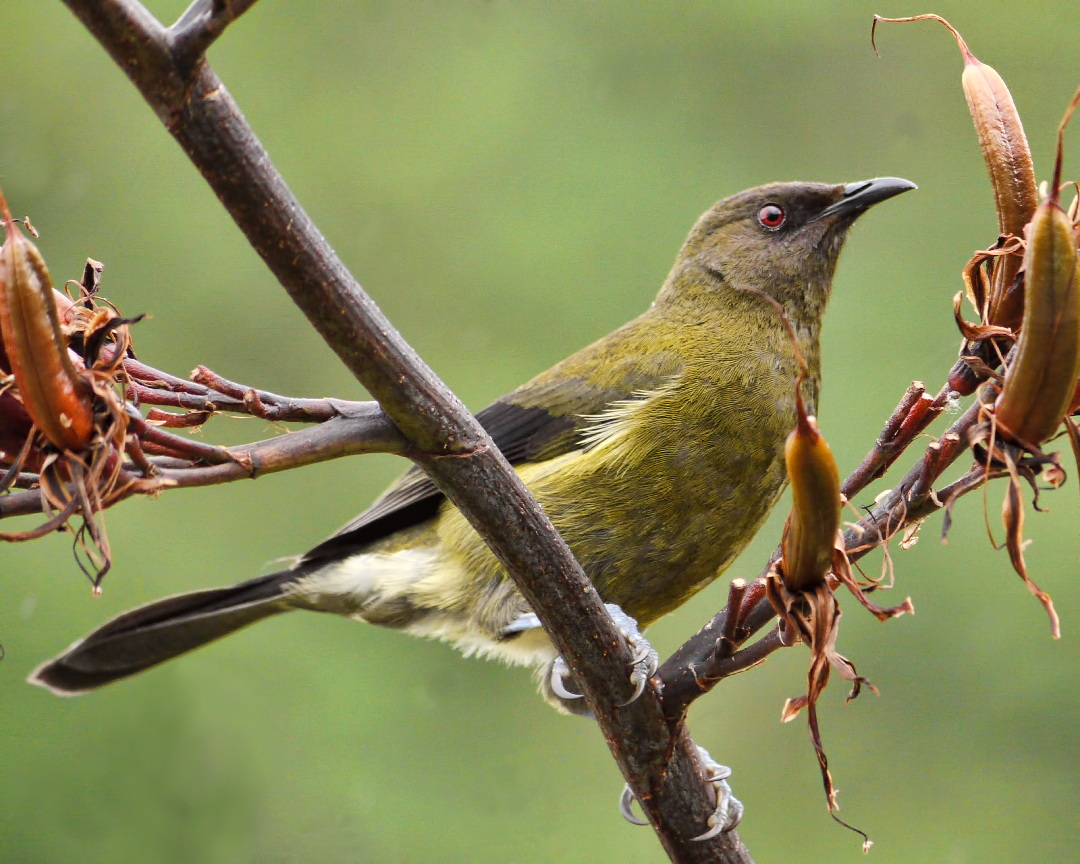
A bellbird (kōpara).

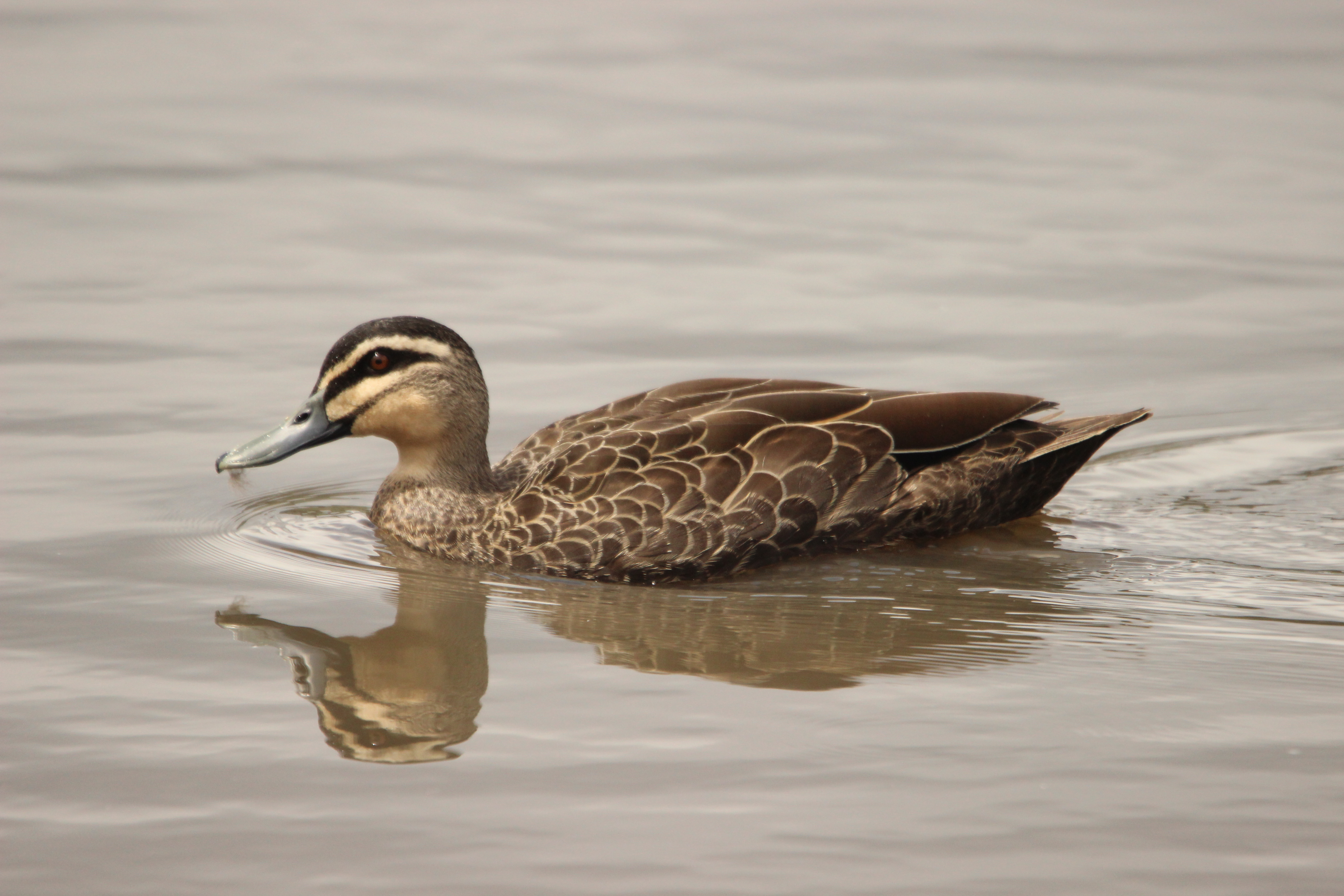
A grey duck (pārera).

One of Tapuwae's grandsons was adopted by Manawa and Kowhaki, two elderly tohunga who lived at Ohinepakā, west of Wairoa (where State Highway 2 now enters the Wairoa river valley). They named the grandson Te Atua-noho-riu ("the god living in the valley") and planned for him to overthrow Tapuwae and become leader of the local region. They made a boast about their adopted son:

Iti te kōpara kai—tarerere ana i te puhi o te kahika, a iti te matakahi pangaia atu ki roto ki te totara pakaru rikiriki

Translation:

The bellbird may be small, but it will swing at the top of the kahikatea tree; the wedge may be small, but it will split the log into pieces

—Mitchell 2014, pp. 124 & 242

This has become a famous proverb for people seeking to gain leadership and was quoted to soldiers by Henare Wepiha Te Wainohu at Gallipoli during the First World War. Although people suggested that Tapuwae should take action against the tohunga, he refused, saying, "leave them be; just cough at them."

When Te Atua-noho-riu had grown older, Manawa and Kowhaki stole Tapuwae's heru (comb), put it in the cooking fire and served Te Atua-noho-riu food that had been cooked over it. This was a serious attack, intended to destroy Tapuwae's tapu and again the people called on him to take violent revenge, but Tapuwae said, kati noa me a pārera noa atu ("no, just drive them off like grey ducks"). When they heard this, Manawa and Kowhaki fled south to Heretaunga. At Mohaka, they were served dinner, but Te Atua-noho-riu took food for himself before everyone else, a shocking breach of protocol, which Kohaki took as a sign that they should return and seek to seize power for Te Atua-noho-riu. They went first to Poututu, where they recruited Manawa's allies Whakamae and Kaike, then proceeded to Whakamahi (just west of the Wairoa River mouth). Manawa gave this land to Te Atua-noho-riu and married him to Tapuwae's daughter Kai-momona. After this, Manawa and Kowhaki withdrew eastward and established a fortress called Wairoro at Te Kokohu on the Tahaenui River.

=== Visit of Taharakau ===
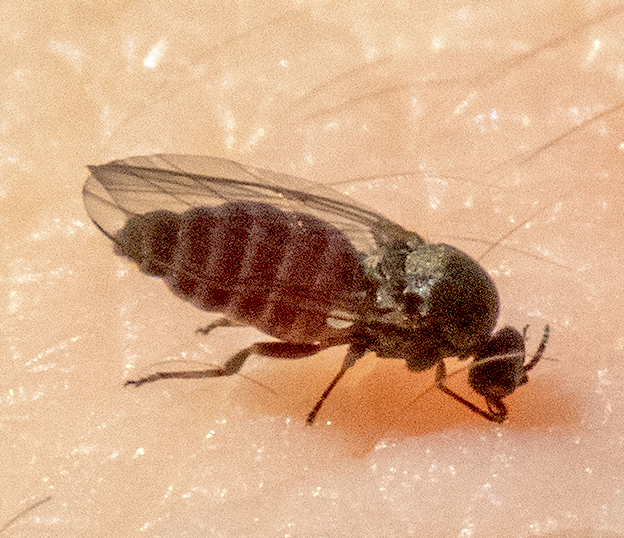
sandfly (namu) feeding on human blood.

Rongomaitahuna and Tumokonui, two brothers from Manutūkē in Tūranganui-a-kiwa, attacked Tapuwae's territory on a raid and were killed at Parawera. Although the bodies were his property as prizes of war, Tapuwae generously returned the brothers' bodies to their father, Taharakau. He travelled to Wairoa with Te Angiangi of Ngāti Kahungunu, arriving at Hikukoekoea, where they were met by Tapuwae's wife Te Rauaumata, who planned to have the visitors cooked and eaten. Tapuwae prevented this and brought them to Kaimango, where his other wife Te Rauhina was in residence. The two chiefs held a discussion, which produced important proverbs. When Tapuwae asked what the true sign of a rangatira (chief) is, Taharakau said:

He whare tu ki te paenga he kai na te ahi, a he whare maihi i tu ki roto ki te pa tuwatawata a Kahukura a Rongomai he tohu no te tangata rangatira

Translation:

A house standing in a solitary part is the food of fire; an adorned house standing within a stockade pā of Kahukura a Rongomai is the mark of chieftainship.

—Mitchell 2014, p. 126

This demonstrated that Taharakau had come in peace. Tapuwae then asked what the main food was at Tūranganui-a-kiwa and Taharakau said: He ahi kōaka ki te awatea, a he ai ki te pō ("cabbage tree leaves in the day, sex at night"), a modest response. Taharakau asked the same question about Wairoa and Tapuwae responded with even more modesty: He rā ki te awatea, he namu ki te pō ("sunshine in the day, sandflies at night").

=== Old age and death ===
In his old age, Tapuwae still wished to avenge the death of his mother's father Kotore at the hands of Apanui. He therefore sent his main commander, Takapuwai to attack the fortress of his nephew, Te-O-Tane at Taramarama. When Te-O-Tane was victorious, Tapuwae invited him to Hikukoekoea and recruited him to get revenge on Apanui's descendants. Tapuwae's forces, led by Te Wainohu, who was later renamed Te Kahu-o-te-rangi, joined up with those of Te-O-Tane and marched to Te Kaha in the eastern Bay of Plenty. There, they utterly defeated Te Whānau-ā-Apanui at the Battle of Whawhapō.

Tapuwae died peacefully in old age and was interred at the prestigious burial ground called Tahuna mai Hawaiki, to the west of the Wairoa River mouth, where Ruawharo, the tohunga on the Takitimu waka had left some sand from Hawaiki.

== Family ==
Tapuwae first married Te Rauhina Te Wahine korero āio, daughter of Tureia and sister of Te Huki and had three sons:

- Te Rangituanui, who married Ratuaiterangi, daughter of Te Hikawera and had one son and two daughters:

- Tane-te-kohurangi Moewhare (son)
- Te Whewhera, who married her cousin Te Kapuamatotoru
- Patupuku, who married her cousin Te-O-Tane.

- Hikatu
- Whenua

He also married Ruataumata Te Wahine kai-tangata, who was the daughter of Tamahikawai, son of Kotore. She was his cousin, since Kotore was also the father of Tapuwae's mother. They had eight children:

- Te Matakainga-i-te-tihi (daughter), whose name means "a face to be gazed at as the highest pinnacle." Tapuwae named her the leader of his children at birth and gave her the title of hei tihi ("as the top-knot"). She married Puruate, son of Te Huki and had three sons:

- Te Kapuamatotoru
- Mataitai, ancestor of Īhaka Whaanga.
- Te Kahu-o-te-rangi, ancestor of Ngāti Pahauwera

- Te Wainau (son)
- Kai-momona (daughter), who married Te Atua-noho-riu.
- Hikawai (son)
- Matawhaiti (son)
- Toione (son), who married Te Patu-whakarawe:

- Punehu:

- Kopua, great-grandfather of James Carroll (1857-1926, MP for Eastern Maori)
- Te Kaingaahuhu

- Ngarangi Mataeo

- Whiu-ite-taepa (daughter)
- Kaaka-ite-taepa

According to J. H. Mitchell, only descendants of Tapuwae and his cousin Te Huki are traditionally considered to be aristocrats among the Ngāti Kahungunu of the Wairoa area.

== Bibliography ==
- Mitchell, J. H. (2014). Takitimu: A History of Ngati Kahungunu. Libro International. ISBN 978-1-877514-72-2.
