= Tama-te-rangi =

Tama-te-rangi was a Māori rangatira (chieftain) of the Ngāti Kahungunu iwi and ancestor of the Ngāi Tamaterangi. He was based at Marumaru on the Wairoa River in northern Hawke's Bay, New Zealand. He fought and defeated the neighbouring tribe of Ngāi Tauira with the support of his uncle Rakaipaaka and killed Tu-te-tohi at Pakarae in revenge for his tribe's expulsion from the East Cape area, but was killed in revenge by Parua.

== Life ==
Tama-te-rangi's mother was Hinemanuhiri, through whom he was a direct descendant of Tamatea Arikinui, captain of the Tākitimu canoe. His father was Pukaru, who was the son of Ruapani, the paramount chief of the Tūranganui-a-Kiwa area. He was born at Waerengaahika (modern Hexton, near Gisborne), where his parents had settled alongside his maternal uncle Rakaipaaka. He was the eldest of five siblings, known as Te Tokorima a Hine-manuhiri ("the five of Hine-manuhiri"). His younger brothers were Makoro, Hingaanga, and Pupuni, and his younger sister was Pare-ora. As a young man, he probably participated in Rakaipaaka's ill-fated attack on the chief Tu-te-tohi, which led to the tribe's defeat and exile. Hinemanuhiri and her family travelled southwest and settled at Te Mania in Marumaru (north of Wairoa), while Rakaipaaka settled at Moumoukai on the Nūhaka River.

=== Conflict with Ngāi Tauira ===
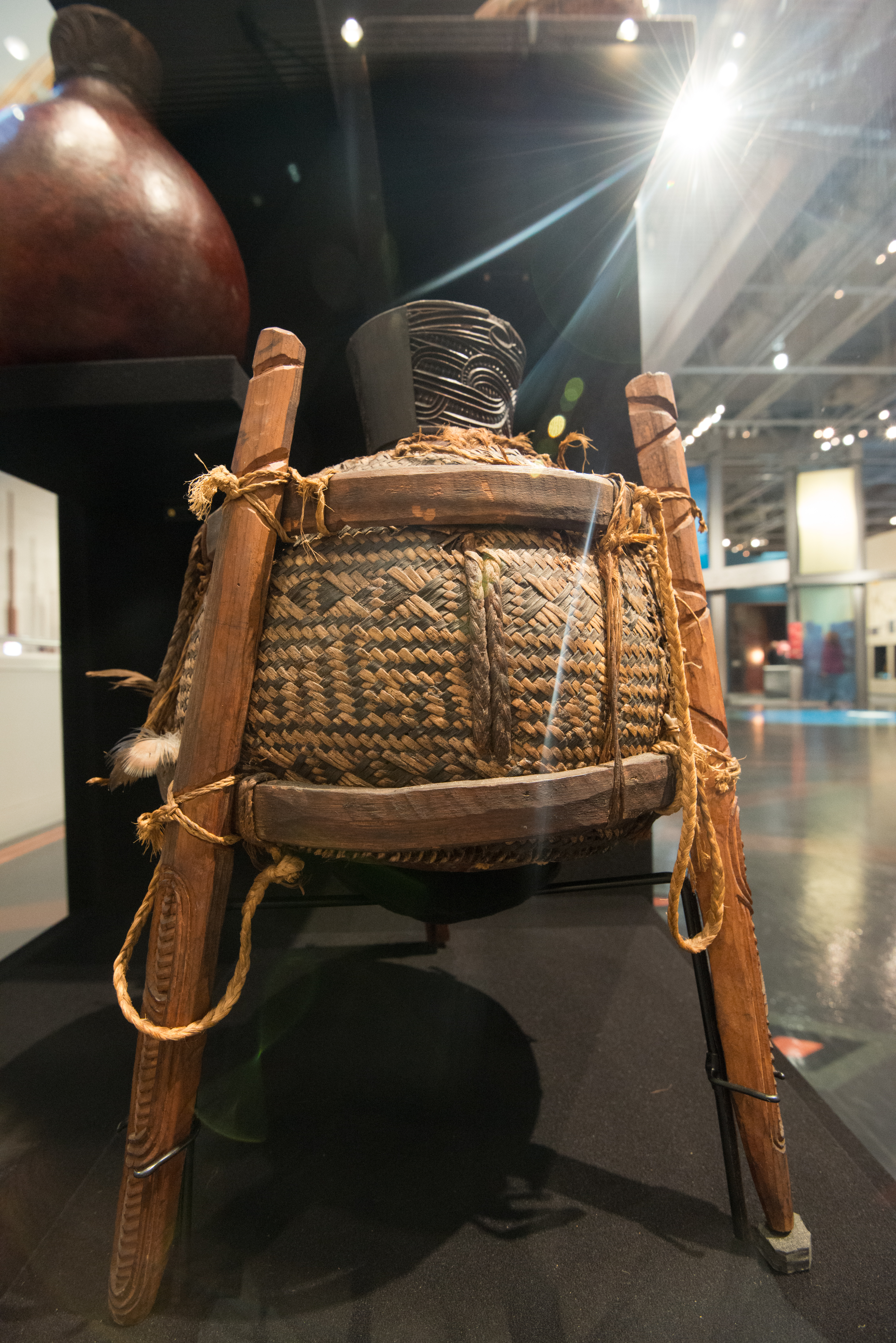
A taha huahua (calabash of preserved bird meat), Te Papa Tongarewa.

Places in the conflict with Ngāi Tauira
1 Te Poti
2 Waharera
3 Waiau River
4 Taupara flats

Mutu son of Tauira, the rangatira of Ngāi Tauira, found Tama-te-rangi's son Rakai-hakeke sleeping with his daughter Hine-kura in his village of Tonga-kaka. He bared his teeth at Rakai-hakeke, indicating that he planned to eat Rakai-hakeke, who fled to his father. Tama-te-rangi was so offended that he decided to go to war. He sent his sons Rakai-hakeke and Tama-te-hua to his uncle Rakaipaaka with a calabash of huahua (cooked birds, preserved in their own fat) to seek his assistance. Rakaipaaka accepted the calabash, symbolising his agreement to help, and gave part of it to his own son Kaukohea and his follower Kahutauranga, symbolising his request for them to come as well. The war parties of Tama-te-rangi and Rakai-paaka met up at Te Poti (near Wairoa), where they held a hui (discussion), until Rakaipaaka's teenage son, Urewera, shouted "Are we here for the black or the red?!" (to talk like a black tūī bird or to fight like red warriors), which became a proverbial saying. Rakaipaaka gave Urewera his patu (club) and the forces set out.

The force went up the east side of the Wairoa River, forded it at Waharera, came down the west side of the river and were crossing the Waiau River when Ngāi Tauira attacked. They defeated Ngāi Tauira and chased them to Kokopu, where Kaukohea and Kahutauranga joined them. The combined force continued to pursue Ngāi Tauira, finally defeating them on the Taupara flats at Awamate, near Aranui. In total, Ngāi Tauira lost 4,000 men in the attack and they were nearly wiped out. After this, Tama-te-rangi and his siblings had total control over the Wairoa River valley.

=== Conflict with Tu-te-kohi and death ===
Tama-te-rangi now led a war party against Tu-te-kohi to get revenge for his family's earlier defeat and expulsion from the Tūranga region. The force gathered at Te Mania in Marumaru, but when they were about to depart, Tama-te-rangi would not come out to perform the tohi ritual, without which the war party could not set out. His younger brother Makoro went in and said E, ta e tu ra ki te tohi i a tatau ("Sir, do get up and perform the tohi ritual over us") and Tama-te-rangi said He ao te rangi ka uhia a ma te huruhuru te manu ka rere ai ("it requires clouds to clothe heaven and feathers to make birds fly"), meaning that he did not have proper clothes. So, Makoro gave Tama-te-rangi his cloak and his wife Hine-muturangi as a provider. The episode has become proverbial and in the East Coast, Māori who cannot afford proper clothes for a public function might say "I am a descendant of Hine-rangi" (i.e. Tama-te-rangi's first wife), while those who can afford it easily might say, "I am a descendant of Hine-muturangi."

The force set out and attacked Tu-te-kohi at Pakarae, near Tolaga Bay. They killed him and one of his female relatives, Hine-nui, but Hine-nui's son, Parua, escaped in a canoe. Tama-te-rangi called on him to come back to the shore. Parua asked after his mother and, when he heard that she was dead, he said: kati ra i mahara hoki ahau ma hau e whaka-ora to taua kui, i a koe ke hoki te u ora ko te u pirau i au, noreira haer e hoki waiho au mate hau o te whakarua e kawa atu ("Then let the deed be done. It was my belief that you would have been the one to save our mother, since you had the sound teat while I had only the defective one. Therefore, go home and let the soft east wind bring me there"). Parua gathered a war party, attacked Tama-te rangi at Ma-kakahi (on the Wairoa River) and killed him. Parua was injured in that attack and was carried home on a stretcher. Tukutuku, Tama-te-rangi's grandson by Rakai-hakeke, attacked them, but Parua's men defended him and killed Tukutuku. Tama-te-rangi was eventually avenged by his great grandson, Tapuwae Poharutanga o Tukutuku.

== Family ==
Tama-te-rangi first married Hine-rangi, a descendant of Kahungunu, and had one child:

- Te Pupuinuku, who married Tu-waikura and had three children:

- Hine-manuhiri, who married her cousin Kotore
- Moe-roto, who also married Kotore
- Kopura, who married Tahu-raunoa and had one son:

- Ngā-herehere, ancestor of the Ngāti Ngāherehere hapū of Ngāpuhi.

Tama-te-rangi subsequently married Hine-mutu-rangi, a descendant of Rākei-hikuroa:

- Rakai-hakeke (son), who married Hine-kura:

- Tukutuku (son), who married Hine-pehinga, daughter of Hine-manuhiri and Kotore:

- Hine-awhi (daughter)

- Te O-kura-tawhiti (son), who married his brother's widow Hine-pehinga:

- Tapuwae Poharutanga o Tukutuku (son)
- Te Māha, who married Te-ahiahi-o-tau, Te Arawhiti, and Kanaia, and had six children:

- Te Kuku
- Te-O-Tane
- Te Rangiwawahia
- Kohuwai
- Kamihi
- Paitehonga

- Tama-te-hua, ancestor of Te Māha's second wife, Te Arawhiti.

== Commemoration ==
The Tama-te-rangi Bridge over the Wairoa River on State Highway 38 near Frasertown is named after him.

== Bibliography ==
- Mitchell, J. H. (2014). Takitimu: A History of Ngati Kahungunu. Libro International. ISBN 978-1-877514-72-2.
