= Manganuiohou River =

- Route of the Manganuiohou River
- Mouth of the Manganuiohou River Manganuiohou River (North Island)

Location
- Country: New Zealand

Physical characteristics
- Source: Pukekohu Range
  - coordinates: 38°45′42″S 177°10′38″E
- Mouth
  - location: Waiau River
  - coordinates: 38°54′10″S 177°26′20″E
- Length: 19 km (12 mi)

Basin features
- Progression: Manganuiohou River → Waiau River → Wairoa River → Hawke Bay → Pacific Ocean
- Tributaries
  - left: Te Māhanga Stream, Motumota Stream
- Waterfalls: Te Rerehautai Falls

The Manganuiohou River is a river of the northeast of New Zealand's North Island. It flows southwards from its source in Te Urewera National Park immediately to the northwest of Lake Waikaremoana, and joins with the Waiau River at the park's southwestern boundary.

== See also ==
- List of rivers of New Zealand
