= Mangapōike River =

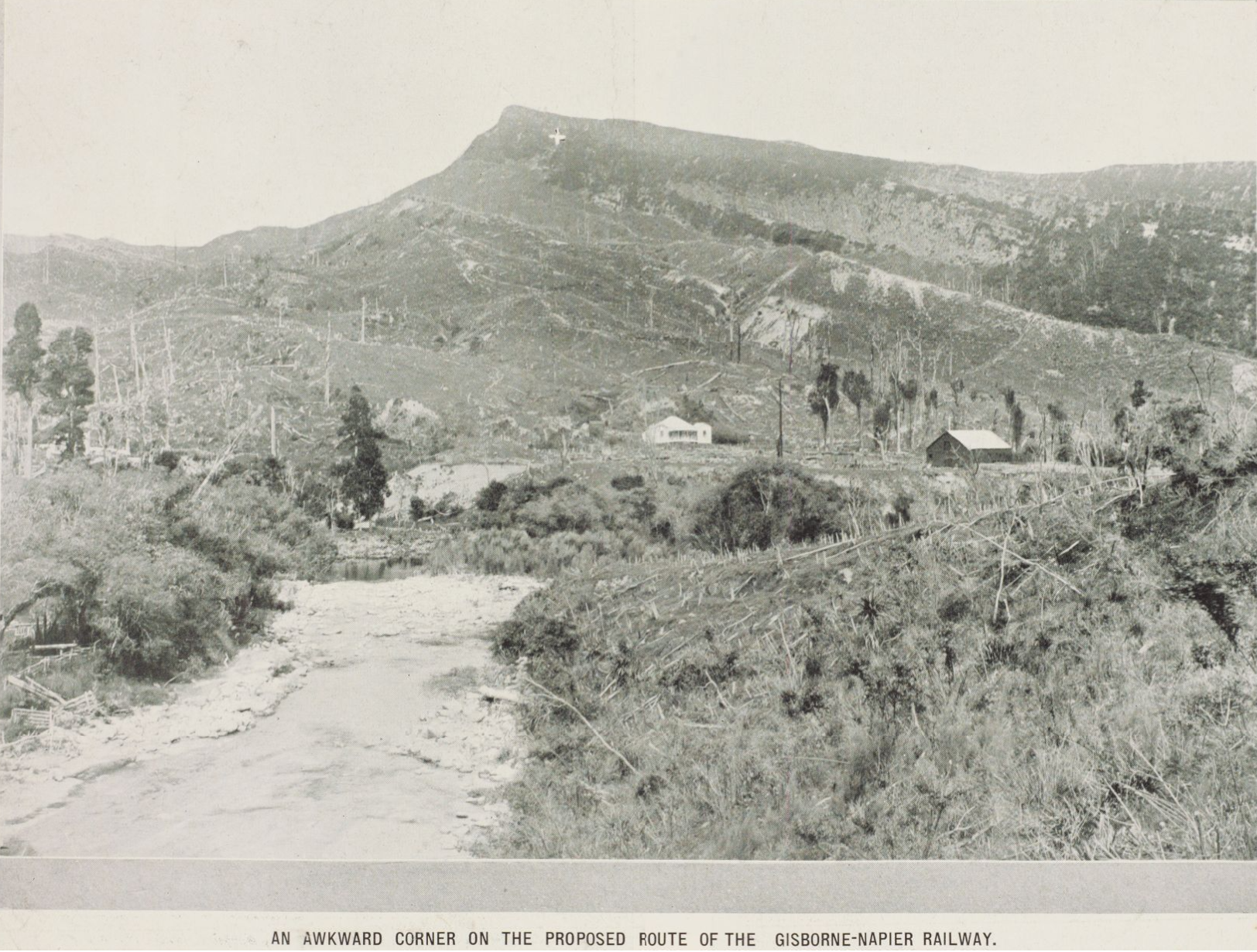
- Mangapōike River in 1911
- Route of the Mangapōike River
- Mouth of the Mangapōike River Mangapōike River (North Island)
- Native name: Mangapōike (Māori)

Location
- Country: New Zealand
- Island: North Island
- Region: Gisborne, Wairoa (Hawke's Bay)

Physical characteristics
- Source: Clapcott Dam
  - coordinates: 38.86308°S 177.77665°E
- Mouth: Wairoa River
  - coordinates: 38°53′26″S 177°29′32″E
  - elevation: 20 m (66 ft)
- Length: 42 km (26 mi)

Basin features
- Progression: Mangapōike River → Wairoa River → Hawke Bay → Pacific Ocean
- Tributaries
  - left: Tukemōkihi Stream, Mākāretu Stream, Mangaone Stream
  - right: Mangarangiora Stream, Mangaputaputa Stream
- Bridges: Opoiti Bridge

The Mangapōike River is a river beginning in the Gisborne District of New Zealand's North Island. It flows generally southwest from sources south of Waingake from the Mangapōike valley water reservoirs, reaching the Wairoa River in Hawke's Bay 10 kilometres (6 mi) northeast of Frasertown. Mangapōike River was Gazetted as an official name on 28 November 2022.

== Geography ==
Whakapunake at 962 m (3,156 ft) is the highest point in the catchment, with the Mangarangiora Stream draining its eastern slopes into the Mangapōike. Whakapunake is traditionally where Māui snagged his fish hook. It is the northern boundary of Ngāti Kahungunu's rohe. A 200 ft (61 m) transmitter mast was built at the south end of Whakapunake in 1969. It is now operated by Kordia. In the river's main catchment, 740 m (2,430 ft) Pūkaroronui is the highest point.

The main geological influence on the river is that it drains from the Mangaone Anticline to the Wairoa Syncline. Below Tukemokihi the river runs through Cenozoic limestones. From Tukemokihi, upstream, the rocks are Miocene mudstones and sandstones.

Lake Te Horonui formed after 25 February 2018, when about 200 m (660 ft) of a sandstone hill slipped and dammed the river. The trigger for the landslide is unknown as there were no significant rainfall events or earthshaking events in the year prior to the Mangapoike Rockfall occurring.The landslide was probably due to the river cutting into the foot of the dip slope, where water trapped in the sandstone by an impermeable mudstone may have lubricated the bedding plane. After over 144 mm (5.7 in) of rain fell on 9–10 March, the 50 m (160 ft) deep lake grew from 9 ha (22 acres) to 30 ha (74 acres) and soon to 33 ha (82 acres). The bridge to Mangapōike Station might have flooded if a channel hadn't been blasted on 28 March and 9 April, allowing water into another new lake, Tukemokihi, and lowering Lake Te Horonui back to 30 ha (74 acres). Part of the detached slide block remained as a mass of around 8.5 million tonnes. The new lake is being used by grebes. The name Lake Mangapōike was also considered, but The Minister for Land Information, Damien O’Connor, agreed to the new name, which refers to the landslide.. The lake was not named formally initially as it was regarded as being likely ephemeral. That looks likely to be the case as subsequent storms have resulted in the lake being infilled by sediment. It is likely that the temporary lake will be completely infilled within the next 10 years.

There are three gravel roads in the valley, but they have no direct link to each other. From the tar-sealed Tiniroto Road, Kotare Road runs a few kilometres east. It ends at a gorge (named by one study as Haupatanga), which is over 100 m (330 ft) deep and largely inaccessible. Mangapōike Road runs through the Makaretu Stream valley to join the Mangapōike valley and then along the south bank of the river to Tukemokihi. The upper catchment is partly accessed by Paparatu Road.

== History ==
A preliminary survey for the Napier-Gisborne railway in 1905 favoured using the valley, with a tunnel linking it to Te Ārai valley. It was rejected in 1912, in favour of Hangaroa, Waikura and Ngātapa, as they served an area thought to have more economic potential.

There were two small schools in the valley. Paparatu School was on Paparatu Road. It was built in 1938, had 14 on its roll in 1947 and closed between 1978 and 1986. Tukemokihi School was open by 1931. It closed at the end of 2006 and was given back to its previous landowners in 2012.

Paparatu was the scene of an ambush on Te Kooti in 1868, after his escape from Rēkohu.

Gisborne's water supply comes partly from reservoirs at the head of the valley. Water was first piped from the Mangapōike valley in 1917. In October 1942 ratepayers approved a £45,000 loan for a 246 million gallon 246,000,000 imp gal (1,120,000 m^{3}) reservoir, designed by G. F. Clapcott, the borough engineer, with a 3.25 mi (5.23 km) pipeline and an 80 ft (24 m) tunnel to Te Ārai valley. The arch dam is 50 ft (15 m), or 40 ft (12 m) high, covers 58 acres (23 ha) and filled in May 1948. A new pipeline and a 330 ft (100 m) tunnel now connects the 1948 Clapcott Dam, the 1972 Sang Dam (347,568 m^{3} (76,454,000 imp gal)) and the HC Williams Dam, built in 1974 (1,833,491 m^{3} (403,312,000 imp gal)). In 2023 Cyclone Gabrielle damaged 9 of the 21water pipe bridges in the network and left two of reservoirs with cloudy water. Sang has an earth dam.

The cyclone also left forestry slash backed up for more than 50 m (160 ft) at the bridge where the Mangapōike joins the Wairoa. Te Puna Bridge, near Tukemokihi, had a pier damaged.

== See also ==
- List of rivers of New Zealand
