= Moerangi Stream =

River in New Zealand

- Route of the Moerangi Stream
- Mouth of the Moerangi Stream Moerangi Stream (North Island)
- Native name: Moerangi (Māori)

Location
- Country: New Zealand
- Island: North Island
- Region: Hawke's Bay
- District: Wairoa

Physical characteristics
- Source: Moerangi
  - coordinates: 38.7245°S 176.723°E
- Mouth: Wairoa Stream
  - coordinates: 38°45′04″S 176°47′22″E

Basin features
- Progression: Moerangi Stream → Wairoa Stream → Waiau River → Wairoa River → Hawke Bay → Pacific Ocean

The Moerangi Stream or Moerangi River is a small river located in New Zealand's Whirinaki Te Pua-a-Tāne Conservation Park. It is one of the upper tributaries of the Waiau River, Hawke's Bay. This river is mostly used by trampers (hikers), fishermen, and hunters.

The Moerangi Stream can only be accessed by foot or helicopter. There are 2 primary routes on foot. The first, Okahu Road to Rogers Hut, takes about 3 hours. The other, from Whirinaki Car Park to Moerangi Hut, takes 4 hours. This route is more difficult and has more challenging terrain compared to the first.

There is a tramping track that follows the river for most of its length. The track runs from Rogers Hut at the downstream end of the river up to Moerangi Hut in the upper part of the river.

The river is the spawning tributary of the Waiau River and has a population of rainbow trout. Trout in this river typically fall into the 3-6 pound bracket. There is fishing opportunities all the way from Rogers up to Moerangi Hut. Past Moerangi Hut. The river decreases in size, but in autumn, the fish move into the headwaters to spawn.

The track that follows the river provides access to some remote hunting grounds. Red deer are the most common game found in the area along with a few wild pigs.
