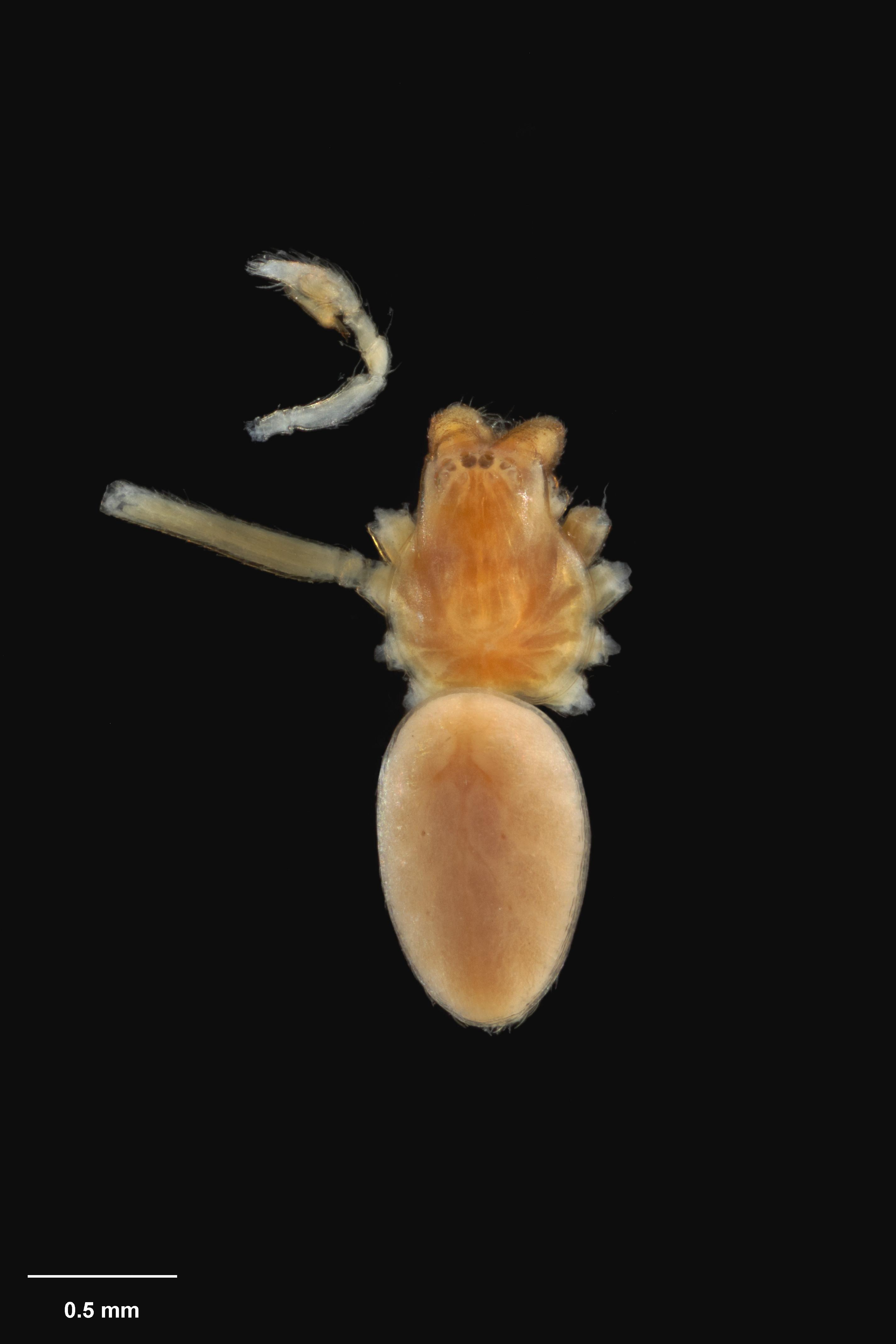

Conservation status
- Data Deficit (NZ TCS)

Scientific classification
- Kingdom: Animalia
- Phylum: Arthropoda
- Subphylum: Chelicerata
- Class: Arachnida
- Order: Araneae
- Infraorder: Araneomorphae
- Family: Dictynidae
- Genus: Viridictyna
- Species: V. picata

Binomial name
- Viridictyna picata Forster, 1970

= Viridictyna picata =

Species of spider

Viridictyna picata is a species of Dictynidae spider that is endemic to New Zealand.

== Taxonomy ==
This species was described in 1970 by Ray Forster from male and female specimens collected around Lake Waikaremoana. The holotype is stored in Te Papa Museum under registration number AS.000084.

== Description ==
The male is recorded at 1.53mm in length whereas the female is 2.28mm. In life, this species is green in colour.

== Distribution ==
This species is only known from near Lake Waikaremoana in New Zealand.

== Conservation status ==
Under the New Zealand Threat Classification System, this species is listed as "Data Deficient" with the qualifiers of "Data Poor: Size" and "Data Poor: Trend".
