= Kotore =

Kotore was a Māori rangatira (chieftain) of the Ngāti Kahungunu iwi in the Wairoa area of Hawke Bay of New Zealand. He is said to have been the first to give his iwi the name Ngāti Kahungunu.

== Life ==
Kotore was the son of Makoro and Hine-te-ata. Through his father, he was a descendant of Ruapani and Kahungunu, and thence from Pawa and Kiwa who captained the Horouta waka and Tamatea Arikinui, who captained the Takitimu. Kotore made his base at Omaruhakeke on the Wairoa River.

Kotore offered his daughter Hinepehinga in marriage to his distant cousin Te Whatuiāpiti, the dominant chieftain in the Heretaunga region, as a peace offering, but she avoided sleeping with him because she was in love with another man, so he abandoned the marriage without ill will and returned to Heretaunga without her.

Omaruhakeke was attacked by Apanui, the founder of Te Whānau-ā-Apanui. Kotore was defeated and mortally wounded. Shortly before he was killed he was brought into the presence of Apanui and said in dismay, E hoa, ko te weriweri ai ka takoto ai au ki roto ki to puku ("My friend, you're an ugly man, for me to end up in your stomach!"). When Apanui asked who was better looking than him, Kotore pointed to his two sons, who had been captured and were about to be executed and said Ara, kia pera me nga tukemata-nui o Kahungunu e arahina mai ra ("Over there - be like the great eyebrows of Kahungunu which are being led towards us"). Ngā Tukemata-nui o Kahungunu (the eyebrows of Kahungunu) became the name for Kotore's descendants, who had previously been known as Ngāti Tokirima a Hinemanuhiri. The name was later shortened to Ngāti Kahungunu and applied also to other descendants of Kahungunu. The death of Kotore and his sons was finally avenged by his great-grandson Te-O-Tane at the Battle of Whawhapō.

== Family ==
Kotore married Moe-roto and Hine-manuhiri, who were both daughters of Tū-waikura and Te Pupuinuku. They were cousins of Kotore, because Te Pupuinuku was the daughter of Kotore's uncle Tama-te-rangi. He had two sons and one daughter:

- Umurau, who died with his father at Omaruhakeke
- Tamahikawai, who died with his father at Omaruhakeke

- Ruataumata, who married her cousin Tapuwae, was the daughter of one of these sons.

- Hinepehinga, who married Tukutuku and Te Okuratawhiti and had a daughter and two sons:

- Hineawhi (daughter)
- Tapuwae Poharutanga o Tukutuku, who received the west bank of the Wairoa River.
- Te Maaha, who received the east bank of the Wairoa River, married Te-ahiahi-o-tau, Te Arawhiti, and Kanaia, and had six children:

- Te Kuku
- Te-O-Tane
- Te Rangiwawahia
- Kohuwai
- Kamihi
- Paitehonga

== Bibliography ==
- Mitchell, J. H. (2014). Takitimu: A History of Ngati Kahungunu. Libro International. ISBN 978-1-877514-72-2.
- Parsons, Patrick (1997). WAI 400: The Ahuriri Block: Maori Customary Interests (PDF).
