= Ruakituri =

- Interactive map of Ruakituri
- Coordinates: 38.827°S 177.520°E
- Country: New Zealand
- Region: Hawke's Bay
- Territorial authority: Wairoa District
- Electorates: Napier; Ikaroa-Rāwhiti (Māori)

Government
  - Territorial authority: Wairoa District Council
  - Mayor of Wairoa: Craig Little
  - Napier MP: Katie Nimon
  - Ikaroa-Rāwhiti MP: Cushla Tangaere-Manuel

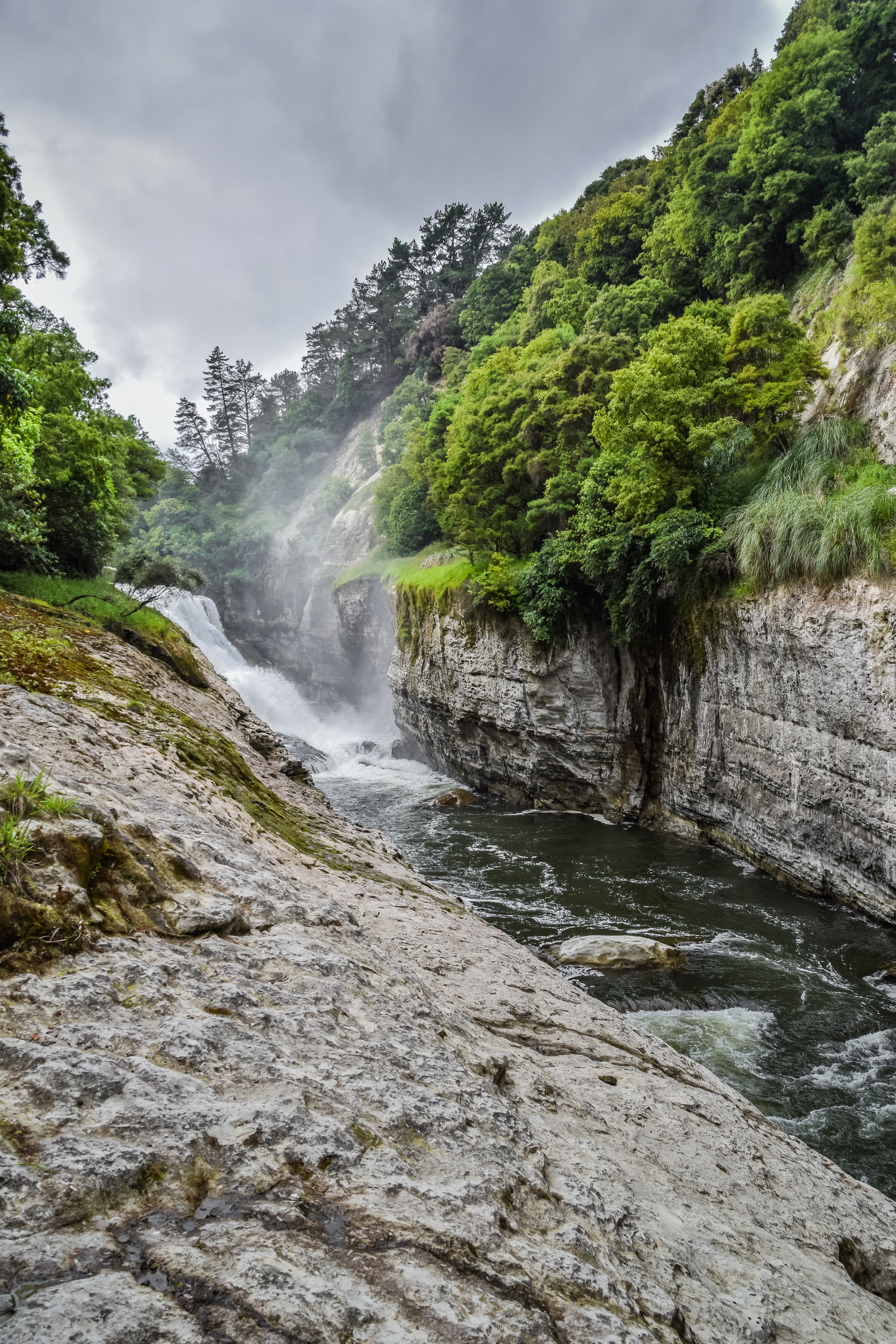
Te Reinga Falls.

Ruakituri is a rural area in the northern Hawke's Bay region of New Zealand's eastern North Island, located north of Wairoa and west of Gisborne.

The community is centred around the Ruakituri River, which merges with the Hangaroa River to form the Wairoa River. The largest settlement is Te Reinga, at the junction of the two rivers, about 25 kilometres (16 mi) north of Wairoa. This settlement is named after the Te Reinga falls, which are just below the junction.

The upper part of the area used to be a lake, called Pupuni. According to legend, the hill Orakai-Whaia on the west side of the Ruakituri River fell in lover with the hill Tauranga-a-Tara on the east side of the river and invited her to marry him; she agreed and moved over to join Orakai-Whaia. This blocked the river and caused the land behind the hills to flood, creating Lake Papuni. Pourangahua rowed over in his canoe and performed magic spells which forced the two hills apart, allowing the river to flow once more. J. H. Mitchell suggested that this story preserves memory of an earthquake that caused a landslip to block the river. In another story, the lake was instead created by the taniwha Ruamano, which swam up the Ruakituri River from the ocean, seeking Lake Waikaremoana, but became lost and settled down in the area, causing the lake to form. Eventually, Ruamano decided to return to the ocean, creating the outlet of the lake as he burst out. Lake Pupuni remained there until 1856, when the digging of a channel accidentally burst the weir at the end of the lake.

In the eighteenth century, there was a pā called Wharekopae at Te Reinga, inhabited by Tutaki and Puraho. When Tutaki was murdered by Puraho, Ngaherehere helped Tutaki's son Tamaroki get revenge and then established himself as the dominant rangatira in the area.

There are two marae (local Māori meeting grounds) in the area. Erepēti marae is affiliated with the iwi (tribe) of Ngāti Kahungunu and its hapū (sub-tribe) of Ngāti Hingānga / Te Aitanga o Pourangahua, and includes the wharenui (meeting house) of Pourangahua. Te Reinga Marae is a meeting ground for the iwi Ngāti Kahungunu and its hapū Ngāti Hinehika and Ngāti Kōhatu, and includes the wharenui of Tuarenga.

== Demographics ==
Ruakituri is within the same statistical area as Ohuka, and demographics are covered in that article.

== Education ==
Ruakituri School is a Year 1-8 co-educational state primary school. It is a decile 7 school with a roll of 9 as of July 2026. It opened in 1919 as Waikatea School, and renamed to Ruakituri School in 1969.
