= Tūtaekurī River (disambiguation) =

The Tūtaekurī River is in the central part of Hawke's Bay, New Zealand, flowing between Napier and Hastings.

Tūtaekurī River may also refer to:

- Tūtaekurī River (Wairoa District), northern Hawke's Bay, New Zealand
- Tūtaekurī River (West Coast), South Island, New Zealand
