= Hangaroa =

Hangaroa may refer to:

- Hangaroa River in Gisborne District, New Zealand
  - The Hangaroa statistical area which includes Tiniroto
- Hanga Roa in Easter Island
