= Tutaekuri =

Tutaekuri or Tūtaekurī may refer to the following:

== Rivers in New Zealand ==
- Tūtaekurī River, Hawke's Bay, flowing from near Taihape to Clive
- Tutaekuri River (Wairoa District), Hawke's Bay, flowing into the Waiau River
- Tūtaekurī River (West Coast), flowing from the Hope Pass to the Ahaura River

== Plants ==
- A potato cultivar
- Anthosachne kingiana, a type of grass, whose Māori name is tūtae kurī
