= Mangaaruhe River =

- Route of the Mangaaruhe River
- Mouth of the Mangaaruhe River Mangaaruhe River (North Island)

Location
- Country: New Zealand

Physical characteristics
- Source: Ngāmoko Range
  - coordinates: 38°45′42″S 177°10′38″E
- Mouth
  - location: Wairoa River
  - coordinates: 38°54′10″S 177°26′20″E
- Length: 31 km (19 mi)

Basin features
- Progression: Mangaaruhe River → Wairoa River → Hawke Bay → Pacific Ocean
- Tributaries
  - left: Poinga Stream, Mangatawhiti Stream, Wairenga Stream
  - right: Pātatanga Stream, Oruatipoki Stream, Mangapōuri Stream, Mangakapua Stream

The Mangaaruhe River is a river of the Hawke's Bay Region of New Zealand's North Island. It flows southeast from the Ngamoko Range southwest of Lake Waikaremoana, flowing into the Wairoa River eight kilometres north of Frasertown.

== See also ==
- List of rivers of New Zealand
