= Viridictyna australis =

Conservation status
- Not Threatened (NZ TCS)

Scientific classification
- Kingdom: Animalia
- Phylum: Arthropoda
- Subphylum: Chelicerata
- Class: Arachnida
- Order: Araneae
- Infraorder: Araneomorphae
- Family: Dictynidae
- Genus: Viridictyna
- Species: V. australis

Binomial name
- Viridictyna australis Forster, 1970

Species of spider

Viridictyna australis is a species of Dictynidae spider that is endemic to New Zealand.

== Taxonomy ==
This species was described in 1970 by Ray Forster from male and female specimens collected on Stewart Island. The holotype is stored in Otago Museum.

== Description ==
The male is recorded at 1.62mm in length whereas the female is 2.93mm. The body is coloured green.

== Distribution ==
This species is only known from Stewart Island and Southland, New Zealand.

== Conservation status ==
Under the New Zealand Threat Classification System, this species is listed as "Not Threatened".
