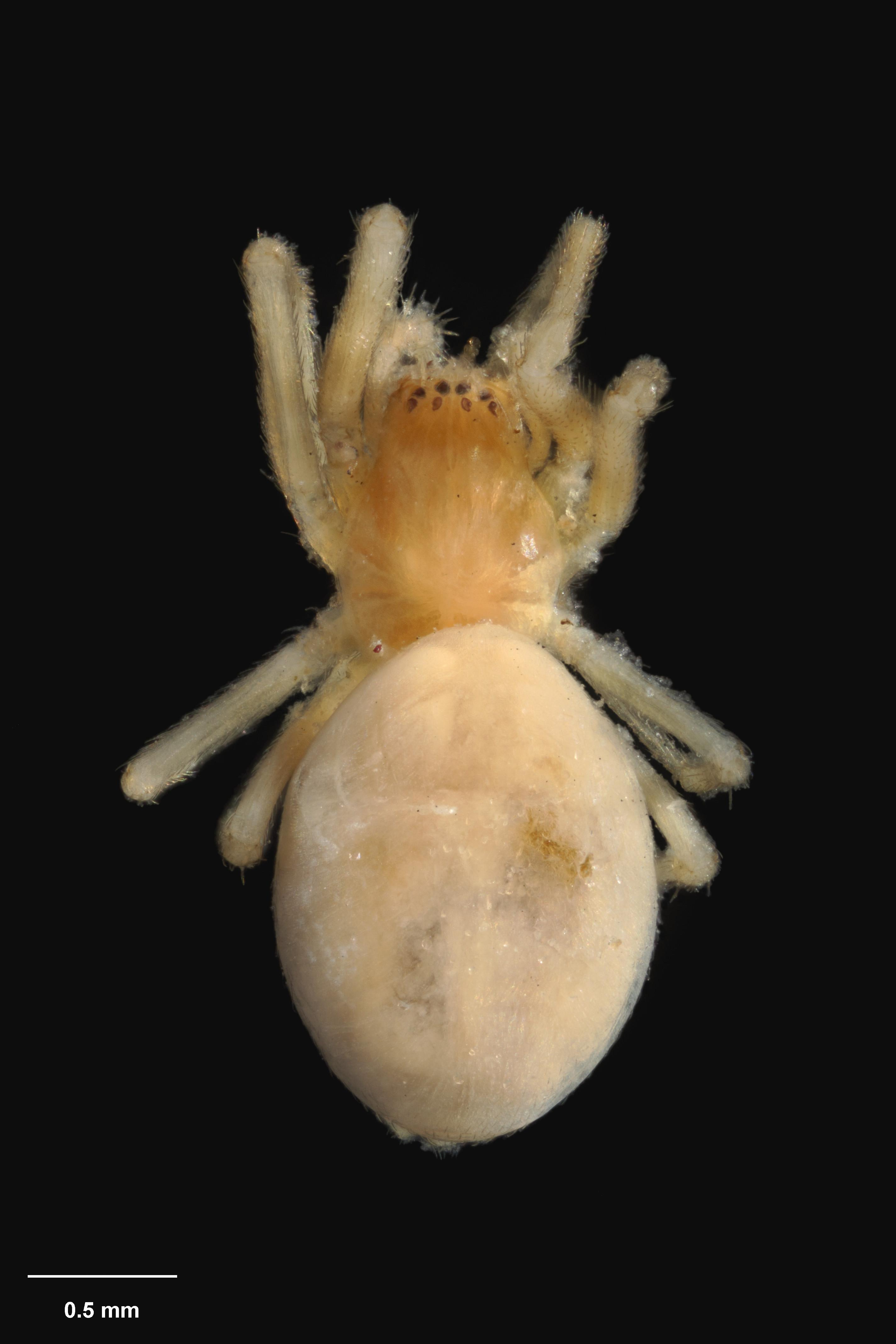

Conservation status
- Not Threatened (NZ TCS)

Scientific classification
- Kingdom: Animalia
- Phylum: Arthropoda
- Subphylum: Chelicerata
- Class: Arachnida
- Order: Araneae
- Infraorder: Araneomorphae
- Family: Dictynidae
- Genus: Viridictyna
- Species: V. parva

Binomial name
- Viridictyna parva Forster, 1970

= Viridictyna parva =

Species of spider

Viridictyna parva is a species of Dictynidae spider that is endemic to New Zealand.

== Taxonomy ==
This species was described in 1970 by Ray Forster from male and female specimens collected in Auckland. This species is stored in Te Papa Museum under registration number AS.000082.

== Description ==
The male is recorded at 2.7mm in length whereas the female is 2.64mm. In life, this species is green in colour.

== Distribution ==
This species is known from the northern part in the North Island of New Zealand.

== Conservation status ==
Under the New Zealand Threat Classification System, this species is listed as "Not Threatened".
