= Waikura River (Hangaroa River tributary) =

- Route of the Waikura River
- Mouth of the Waikura River Waikura River (Hangaroa River tributary) (North Island)
- Native name: Waikura (Māori)

Location
- Country: New Zealand
- Island: North Island
- Region: Gisborne

Physical characteristics
- Source: Confluence of Waikoko Stream and an unnamed stream
  - coordinates: 38.67623°S 177.7231°E
  - elevation: 310 metres (1,020 ft)
- Mouth: Hangaroa River
  - coordinates: 38°38′52″S 177°36′54″E
  - elevation: 195 metres (640 ft)
- Length: 14 km (8.7 mi)

Basin features
- Progression: Waikura River → Hangaroa River → Wairoa River → Hawke Bay → Pacific Ocean

The Waikura River is a river of the southwestern Gisborne District of New Zealand's North Island. It flows initially north before turning west to reach the Hangaroa River 30 kilometres (19 mi) west of Gisborne.

== See also ==
- List of rivers of New Zealand
