= Viridictyna kikkawai =

Conservation status
- Naturally Uncommon (NZ TCS)

Scientific classification
- Kingdom: Animalia
- Phylum: Arthropoda
- Subphylum: Chelicerata
- Class: Arachnida
- Order: Araneae
- Infraorder: Araneomorphae
- Family: Dictynidae
- Genus: Viridictyna
- Species: V. kikkawai

Binomial name
- Viridictyna kikkawai Forster, 1970

Species of spider

Viridictyna kikkawai is a species of Dictynidae spider that is endemic to New Zealand.

== Taxonomy ==
This species was described in 1970 by Ray Forster from male and female specimens collected in Dunedin. It is the type species for the Viridictyna genus. The holotype is stored in Otago Museum.

== Description ==
The male is recorded at 2.28mm in length whereas the female is 1.68mm. In life, the spider is green coloured.

== Distribution ==
This species is only known from Otago, New Zealand.

== Conservation status ==
Under the New Zealand Threat Classification System, this species is listed as "Naturally Uncommon" with the qualifier of "Range Restricted".
