= Waikaretāheke River =

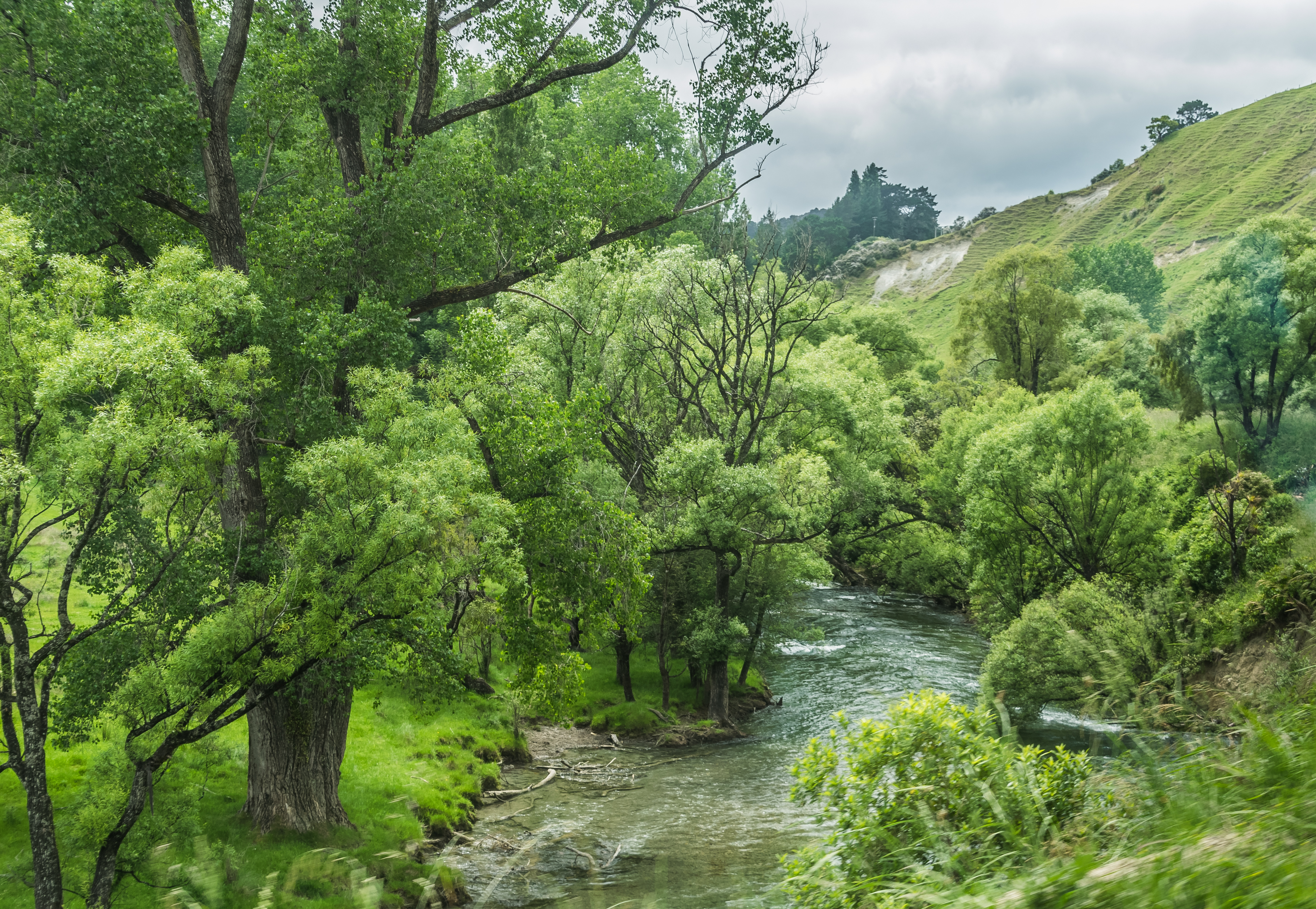
- Waikaretāheke River near Tarapatiki
- Route of the Waikaretāheke River
- Mouth of the Waikaretāheke River Waikaretāheke River (North Island)
- Native name: Waikaretāheke (Māori)

Location
- Country: New Zealand
- Island: North Island
- Region: Hawke's Bay
- District: Wairoa

Physical characteristics
- Source: Lake Waikaremoana
  - location: Onepoto Siphon & Spillway
  - coordinates: 38.7980°S 177.1227°E
- Mouth: Waiau River
  - coordinates: 38°55′27″S 177°15′41″E

Basin features
- Progression: Waikaretāheke River → Waiau River → Wairoa River → Hawke Bay → Pacific Ocean
- Tributaries
  - left: Mangamauku Stream, Mangapapa Stream, Mangahohi Stream, Mākapua Stream
  - right: Whakarongataheke Stream, Parekura Stream
- Bridges: Tarapatiki Bridge, Waikaretaheke Bridge

The Waikaretāheke River is a river of the Hawke's Bay region of New Zealand's North Island. It serves as the outflow of Lake Waikaremoana, flowing southeast from the lake's southeastern shore to reach the Waiau River 20 kilometres (12 mi) northwest of Wairoa. State Highway 38 follows the river's course for much of its length.

== History ==
Over 2,000 years ago, a landslide blocked the Waikaretāheke River, which flooded river valleys.

The upper river was dammed by the Waikaremoana Power Scheme in the early 20th century. Beginning with a temporary power station that was brought online in March 1923, the scheme includes three major hydroelectric power stations: Tuai Power Station which became operational in 1929, Piripaua Power Station in 1943 and Kaitawa Power Station in 1949.

On 15 May 2022, an emergency beacon was activated due to an incident involving a kayaker on the Waikaretāheke River. Emergency officials arrived too late to the scene, and the kayaker's deceased body was recovered from the river.

== See also ==
- List of rivers of New Zealand
