= Viridictyna nelsonensis =

Conservation status
- Data Deficit (NZ TCS)

Scientific classification
- Kingdom: Animalia
- Phylum: Arthropoda
- Subphylum: Chelicerata
- Class: Arachnida
- Order: Araneae
- Infraorder: Araneomorphae
- Family: Dictynidae
- Genus: Viridictyna
- Species: V. nelsonensis

Binomial name
- Viridictyna nelsonensis Forster, 1970

Species of spider

Viridictyna nelsonensis is a species of Dictynidae spider that is endemic to New Zealand.

== Taxonomy ==
This species was described in 1970 by Ray Forster from female specimens collected in Nelson. The holotype is stored in Otago Museum.

== Description ==
The female is recorded at 2.34mm in length. In life, this species is green in colour.

== Distribution ==
This species is only known from Nelson, New Zealand.

== Conservation status ==
Under the New Zealand Threat Classification System, this species is listed as "Data Deficient" with the qualifiers of "Data Poor: Size" and "Data Poor: Trend".
