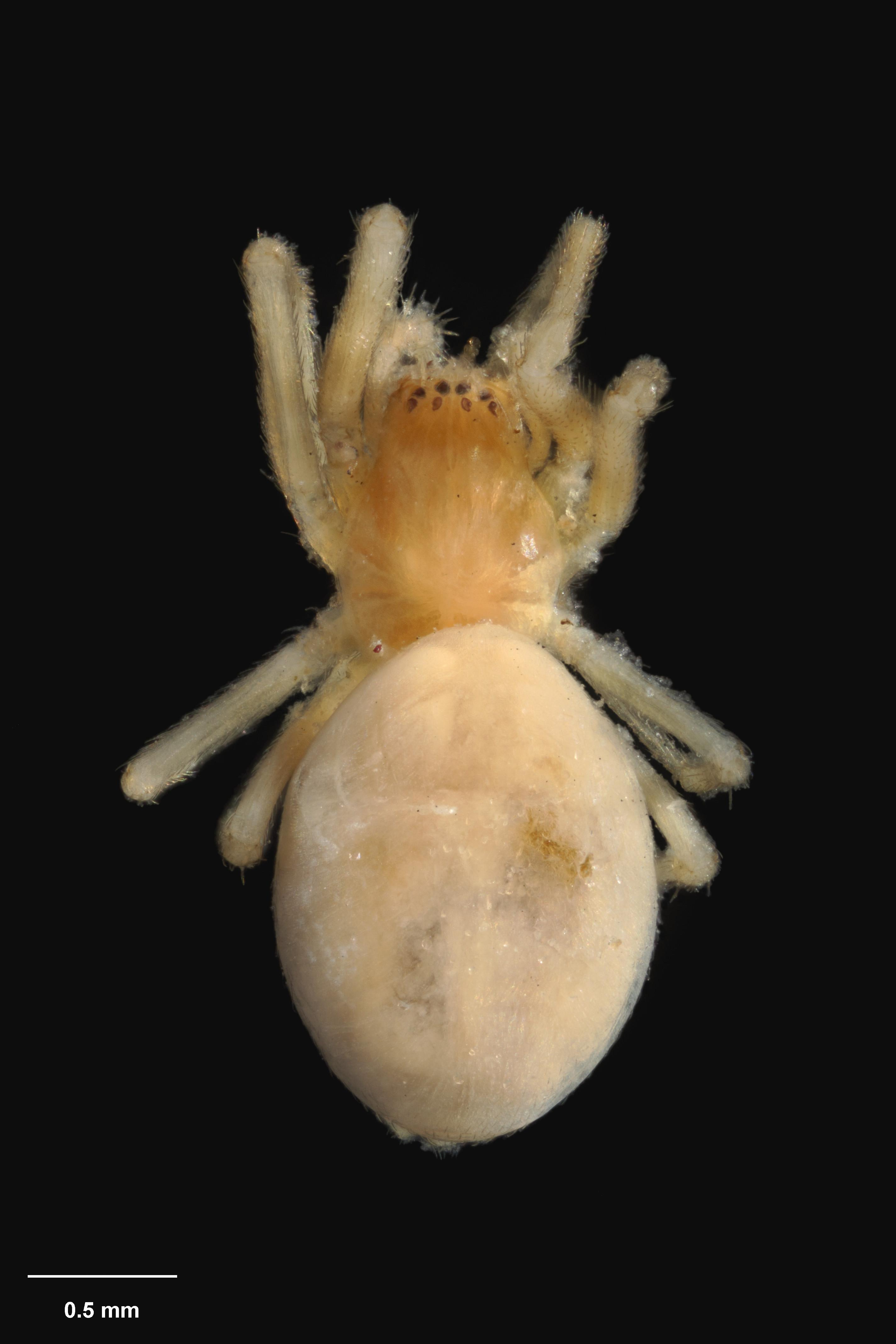
- Viridictyna parva

Scientific classification
- Kingdom: Animalia
- Phylum: Arthropoda
- Subphylum: Chelicerata
- Class: Arachnida
- Order: Araneae
- Infraorder: Araneomorphae
- Family: Dictynidae
- Genus: Viridictyna; Forster, 1970

Type species
- V. kikkawai Forster, 1970

Species
- 5, see text

= Viridictyna =

Genus of spiders

Viridictyna is a genus of South Pacific cribellate araneomorph spiders in the family Dictynidae, and was first described by Raymond Robert Forster in 1970.

== Species ==
As of May 2019 it contains five species, all found in New Zealand:

- Viridictyna australis Forster, 1970 – New Zealand
- Viridictyna kikkawai Forster, 1970 (type) – New Zealand
- Viridictyna nelsonensis Forster, 1970 – New Zealand
- Viridictyna parva Forster, 1970 – New Zealand
- Viridictyna picata Forster, 1970 – New Zealand
