= Tūtaekurī River (Wairoa District) =

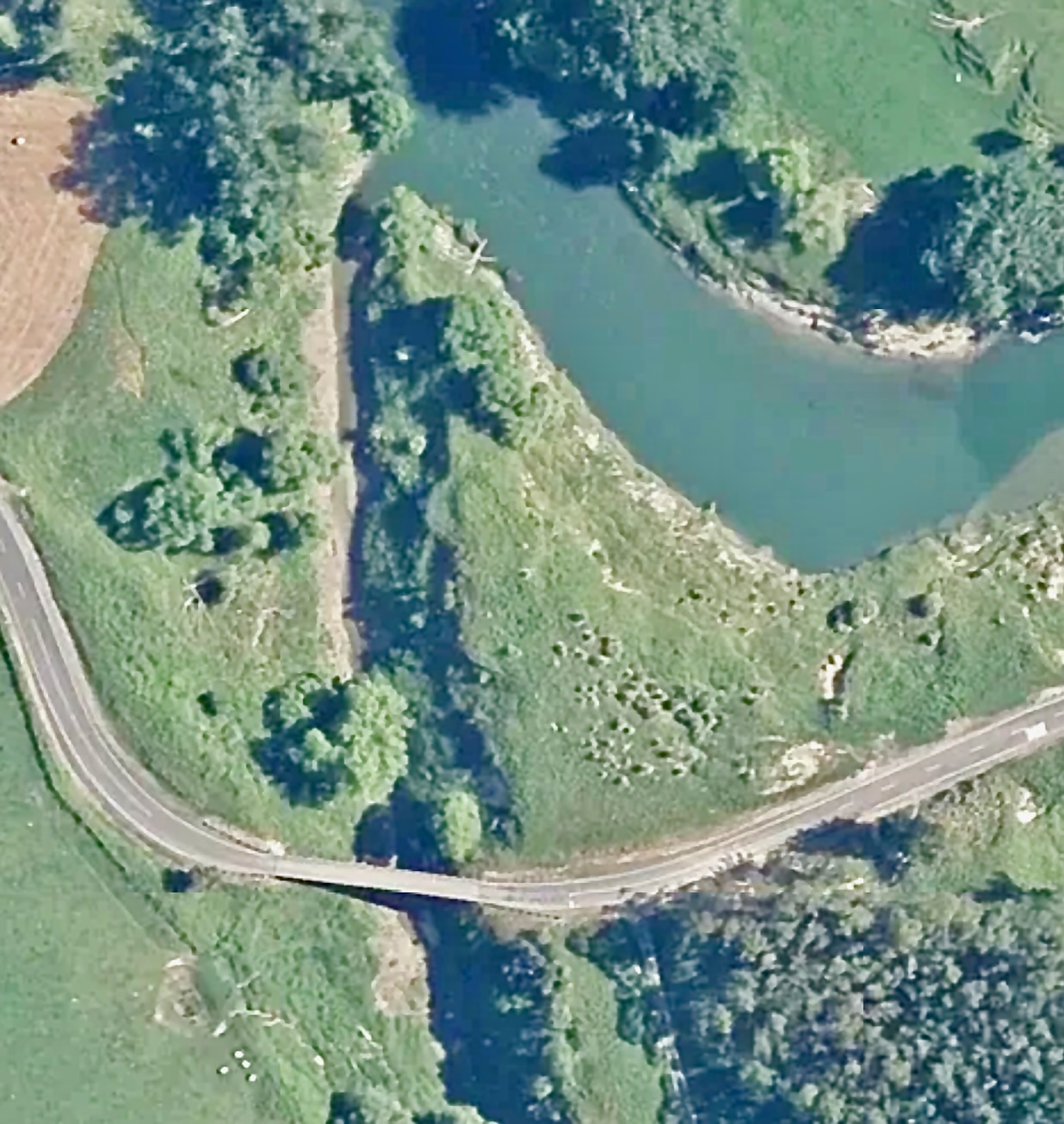
- Tūtaekurī River confluence with Waiau River
- Route of the Tūtaekurī River
- Mouth of the Tūtaekurī River Tūtaekurī River (Wairoa District) (North Island)
- Native name: Tūtaekurī (Māori)

Location
- Country: New Zealand
- Island: North Island
- Region: Hawke's Bay
- District: Wairoa

Physical characteristics
- Source: Gaddum Road
  - coordinates: 38.97655°S 177.26150°E
  - elevation: 300 m (980 ft)
- Mouth: Waiau River
  - coordinates: 38°58′04″S 177°21′58″E
  - elevation: 15 m (49 ft)
- Length: 24 km (15 mi)

Basin features
- Progression: Waiau River → Wairoa River → Hawke Bay → Pacific Ocean
- Bridges: Raumotu Bridge

The Tūtaekurī River, in the Wairoa District of New Zealand's Hawke's Bay, rises below Gaddum Road, in the Tūtaekurī Conservation Area and flows about 24 km (15 mi) east before joining the Waiau River after Raumotu Bridge, about 3 km (1.9 mi) from its confluence with the Wairoa River at Frasertown.

== Biodiversity ==
In the upper part of the river, tawa is the dominant canopy tree, with tītoki, hīnau, nīkau, pukatea, ngaio, kōwhai and scattered mataī, miro and rewarewa.
