= Waiau River (Hawke's Bay) =

- Route of the Waiau River
- Mouth of the Waiau River Waiau River (Hawke's Bay) (North Island)

Location
- Country: New Zealand

Physical characteristics
- Source: Confluence of the Wairoa Stream and Parahaki Stream
  - coordinates: 38°44′26″S 176°51′09″E
- Mouth
  - location: Wairoa River
  - coordinates: 38°57′58″S 177°23′48″E

Basin features
- Progression: Waiau River → Wairoa River → Hawke Bay → Pacific Ocean
- Tributaries
  - left: Te Waiotukapiti Stream, Manganuiohou River, Mangatoatoa Stream, Matuku Stream, Mangatoto Stream, Mangaone Stream, Waihī Stream, Mangapōuri Stream, Raeuhoi Stream, Mangamauka Stream, Te Iringaowhare Stream, Waikaretāheke River
  - right: Mangangārara Stream, Mangakahika Stream, Tātua Stream, Mangakahakaha Stream, Mangahōpai Stream, Pukemataī Stream, Pakihiwi Stream, Mangapirita Stream, Mangarangiora Stream, Ōwhio Stream, Mangawhero Stream, Tūtaekurī River
- Bridges: Te Ariki Bridge, Homeleigh Bridge

Hawke's Bay's Waiau River is one of at least four rivers of this name in New Zealand. It rises in the Kaingaroa Forest to the west of Lake Waikaremoana, and flows southeast for 60 kilometres before joining the Wairoa River.
