= Tāhaenui River =

- Route of the Tāhaenui River
- Mouth of the Tāhaenui River Tāhaenui River (North Island)
- Native name: Tāhaenui (Māori)

Location
- Country: New Zealand
- Island: North Island
- Region: Hawke's Bay
- District: Wairoa

Physical characteristics
- Source: Whakaumu
  - location: Kumi Pakarae Conservation Area - Te Rohe o Te Wairoa Giftback
  - coordinates: 38.96458°S 177.56326°E
- Mouth: Hawke Bay
  - location: Tāhaenui
  - coordinates: 39°03′01″S 177°40′24″E
  - elevation: 0 m (0 ft)
- Length: 17 km (11 mi)

Basin features
- Progression: Tāhaenui River → Hawke Bay → Pacific Ocean
- Tributaries
  - left: Mangapapa Stream, Pōhatanui Stream, Mangapapa Stream
- Bridges: Tāhaenui Bridge

The Tāhaenui River is a river of the Hawke's Bay region of New Zealand's North Island. It flows generally southeast to reach Hawke Bay five kilometres west of Nūhaka.

The New Zealand Ministry for Culture and Heritage gives a translation of "many thieves" for Tāhaenui.

== See also ==
- List of rivers of New Zealand
