= Ruakituri River =

- Route of the Ruakituri River
- Mouth of the Ruakituri River Ruakituri River (North Island)

Location
- Country: New Zealand

Physical characteristics
- Source: Kopuapounamu Stream
  - location: Huiarau Range
  - coordinates: 38°37′52″S 177°12′16″E
- Mouth
  - location: Hangaroa River
  - coordinates: 38°49′43″S 177°31′02″E
- Length: 55 km (34 mi)

Basin features
- Progression: Ruakituri River → Hangaroa River → Wairoa River → Hawke Bay → Pacific Ocean
- Tributaries
  - left: Te Rake Stream, Ōwhakarotu Stream, Anini Stream, Mangaangawahine Stream, Kapanui Stream, Mangatahae Stream, Te Rapa Stream, Mākōkōmuka Stream, Taopo Stream, Mangapapa Stream, Ngapunarua Stream, Urenui Stream, Mangatupo Stream, Mangaroa Stream, Te Hinu Stream, Waipai Stream, Mākōkōmuka Stream, Whakapune Stream, Paruparu Stream
  - right: Te Kei Stream, Tātaramoa Stream, Waipaoa Stream, Rimanaua Stream, Mangarewarewa Stream
- Waterfalls: Waitangi Falls

The Ruakituri River is a river of the Gisborne District and Hawke's Bay Region of New Zealand's North Island. It initially flows northeast from its sources north of Lake Waikareiti. Within its course are the 72 m high Waitangi Falls. Afterwards it turns southeast for the majority of its course, reaching the settlement of Te Reinga, 25 kilometres (16 mi) north of Wairoa. It merges with the Hangaroa River resulting in the Wairoa River.

== See also ==
- List of rivers of New Zealand
