= Āniwaniwa Falls =

Waterfall in the North Island of New Zealand

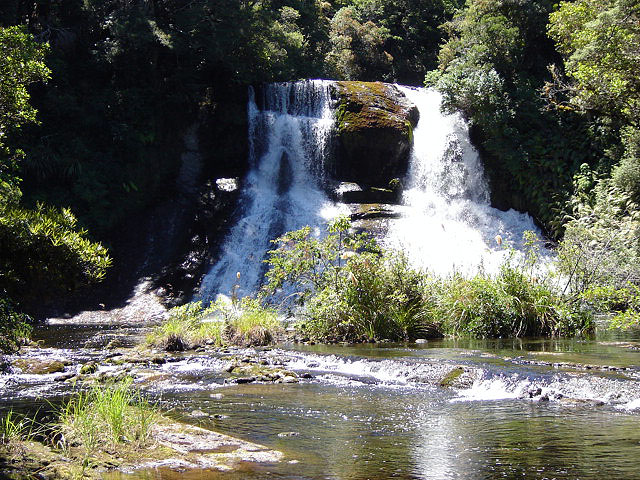
- Āniwaniwa Falls
- Interactive map of Āniwaniwa Falls
- Location: Hawke's Bay, New Zealand
- Coordinates: 38.742201°S 177.161794°E
- Type: Cascade
- Watercourse: Āniwaniwa Stream and Mangapuwerawera Stream

The Āniwaniwa Falls, or Rainbow Falls, are a two-drop waterfall located at northeastern Lake Waikaremoana in New Zealand.

== See also ==
- List of waterfalls
- Waterfalls of New Zealand
