= Marumaru =

Australian music producer, songwriter, comedian, and translator

marumaru
- Also known as: Cherax Destructor, helpful kappa, ᴅᴀɪᴋᴜ ɪɴᴅᴜsᴛʀɪᴇs, lucky beast
- Born: 6 July 1993 (age 32); Sydney
- Genres: IDM, friendship-hop, breakcore, glitch, ambient, acoustic, alternative, folktronica
- Instruments: Vocals, guitar, piano, synthesizer, euphonium, trombone, DAW, sampler
- Years active: 2011–present
- Labels: Morning Hour Records, Gak Attack Records, Dogworld Records
- Website: Website Bandcamp as marumaru Bandcamp as CxDr

Avery Hutley (born 6 July 1993), better known by the name of her musical project marumaru or her former project Cherax Destructor (abbreviated to CxDr), is an Australian electronic music producer, songwriter, comedian, and manga translator based in Kyoto. She has also released work under the pseudonyms ᴅᴀɪᴋᴜ ɪɴᴅᴜsᴛʀɪᴇs, helpful kappa and lucky beast, and is a member of the Australian pop rock band Dr. Spaceman.

== History ==
Avery Hutley was born and raised in Sydney, Australia. Following the influence of her older sisters, she joined her primary school's concert band in her third year, and learned to play the euphonium. At the same time, she also took piano lessons, but was disinterested. In an interview, she expressed that she regretted not learning earlier.

In the same interview, Hutley stated that her first electronic musical inspiration was a childhood friend, Luke Midworth, and that in her youth she did not "get" electronic music. Hutley only began making electronic music after discovering Ableton Live through Midworth.

== Musical style ==
Hutley considers her music under the name Cherax Destructor to be "folktronica / friendship-hop". Cherax Destructor's music has been compared by Under the Radar to the works of Baths.

In contrast, Hutley refers to helpful kappa as "post-rock", citing Sigur Rós and Explosions in the Sky as her main influences, and refers to ᴅᴀɪᴋᴜ ɪɴᴅᴜsᴛʀɪᴇs as "breakcore / bass music" inspired by Yoko Kanno and Hiroyuki Sawano.

== Reception ==
In 2013, the track <3 from the album Amity Lines was described by Under the Radar, a popular American indie music magazine, as "joyful melodies – all chopped up and twisted into one another". Hutley was also described later that year to have "pioneered the 'friendship-hop' movement", by BULLSH!T, a partially satirical Australian media outlet.

The song <3 was also aired in 2013 on 2SER, an Australian radio station, in a feature entitled The Band Next Door, in which alternative and underground Australian musicians are showcased.

Cherax Destructor was one of the headlining acts of AVCon's 2015 JOYPAD after-dark party in Adelaide, Australia. AVCon described Hutley as "a conflicted soul", but said that her music fuses her passions "into something weird and wonderful".

== Discography ==
=== Albums ===
- Lost No Longer (Digital – 2013) (as Cherax Destructor)
- Amity Lines (Digital – 2013) (as Cherax Destructor)
- Gak Attack Vol. 1 (Digital – GAK001 – 2013) (as CxDr & eery)
- Cenotaphs (CD/Digital – MHR032 – 2014) (as Cherax Destructor)
- MHR: Vol. 3 (Digital – MHR036 – 2015) (as CxDr and ᴅᴀɪᴋᴜ ɪɴᴅᴜsᴛʀɪᴇs)
- Chymes (Digital – 2015) (as Cherax Destructor & Rhyme Flow)
- #rare archives vol.01 (Digital – 2016) (as cxdr)
- someone else's story (Digital – 2017) (as cxdr, remastered in 2023 as Marumaru)
- LB02 (Digital – MARU02 – 2019) (as lucky beast)
- 残響のTERRIBLE (CD/Digital – MARU03 – 2020) (as ᴅᴀɪᴋᴜ ɪɴᴅᴜsᴛʀɪᴇs)
- This Time Next Year (Digital – MARU04 – 2023) (as Marumaru)

=== EPs ===
- Sweetie Belle: The Remixes (Digital – 2012) (as Cherax Destructor)
- Objects in Space EP (Digital – 2012) (as Cherax Destructor)
- january, baby, xoxo (Digital – DWR001 – 2013) (as pilbu)
- the month of love: febio (Digital – DWR002 – 2013) (as pilbu)
- pray for april (Digital – DWR004 – 2013) (as pilbu)
- may: contain traces of soy (Digital – DWR005 – 2013) (as Cherax Destructor)
- The Dogworld ~666~ Mid Year Spectacular (Digital – DWR006 – 2013) (as pilbu)
- we are spirits now, rejoice (Digital – MHR030 – 2014) (as helpful kappa)
- Live! from the Ocean Floor (Digital – 2014) (as Cherax Destructor)
- america beats (Digital – 2014) (as cxdr)
- Phoenix Remixes EP (CD/Digital – 2014) (as Cherax Destructor)
- astronomy club (Digital – MHR040 – 2015) (as ᴅᴀɪᴋᴜ ɪɴᴅᴜsᴛʀɪᴇs)
- fuck everyone in this beautiful world (Digital – 2015) (as cxdr)
- Wanting/Knowing (Digital – SHC001 – 2015) (as Francis Vace and Cherax Destructor)
- split// (Cassette/Digital – 2017) (as cxdr & fatherfake)
- LB01 (Digital – 2018) (as lucky beast)
- then we'll become weapons (CD/Digital – MARU01 – 2019) (as helpful kappa)
- loose beats for loose change (Digital – 2020) (as marumaru)
- loose beats for loose change, vol. 2 (Digital – 2021) (as marumaru)

=== Singles ===
- Cupcake (Digital – 2013) (as Cherax Destructor)
- Hymn of the Haunted Hunter (Digital – MHR031 – 2014) (as Cherax Destructor)
- Lion's Pride (Digital – 2016) (as Chymes)
- all i see is stars (Digital – 2017) (as cxdr)
- daiku forever industries (Digital – 2022) (as ᴅᴀɪᴋᴜ ɪɴᴅᴜsᴛʀɪᴇs)
- Position Zero (Digital – 2022) (as Marumaru)
- Unrequited (Digital – 2022) (as Marumaru)
- Phantom Falling (Digital – 2023) (as Marumaru)
- Kurisu (Digital - 2024) (as Marumaru)
- The Way Out (Digital - 2026) (as marumaru)
