= Hangaroa River =

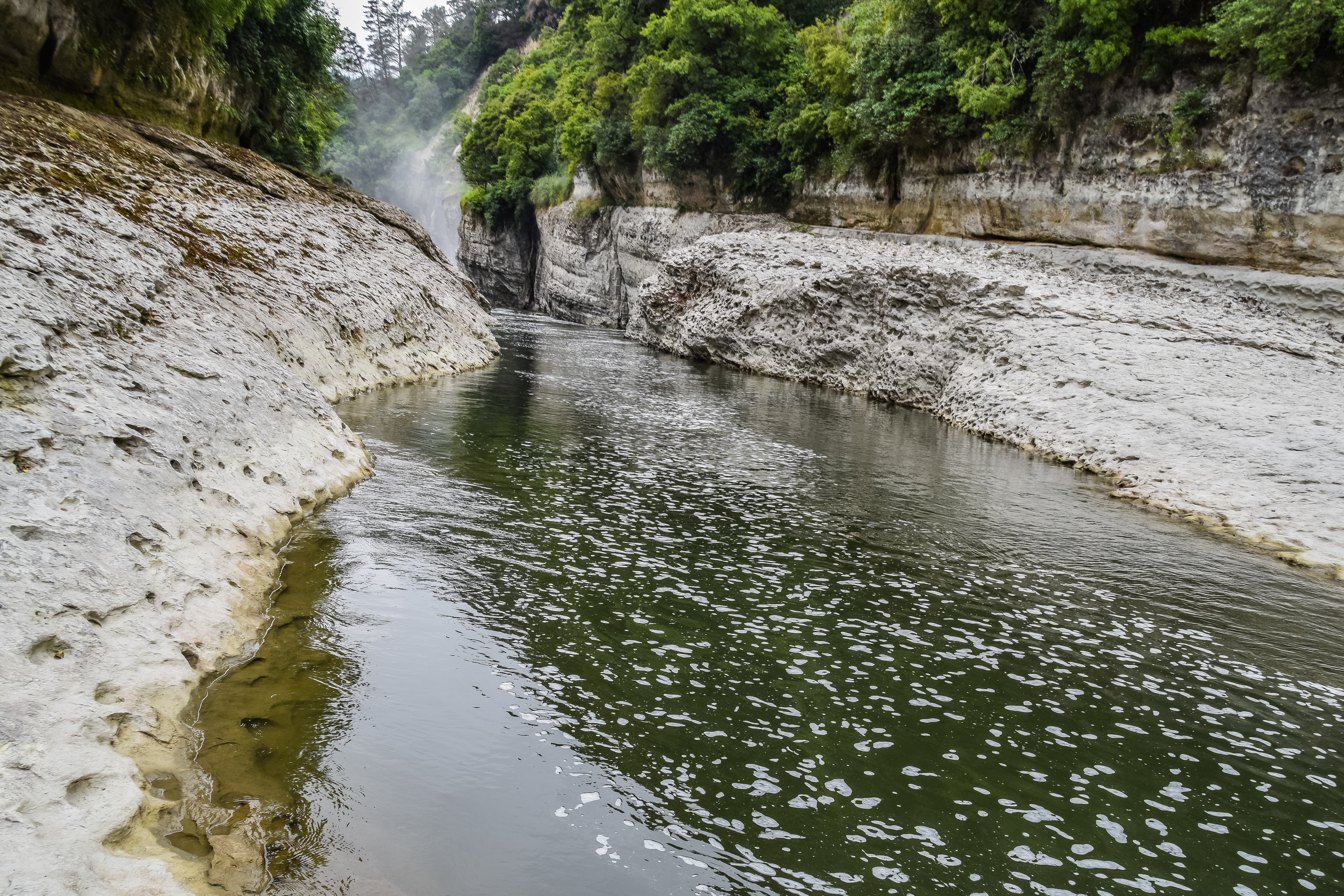
- Te Reinga Falls
- Route of the Hangaroa River
- Mouth of the Hangaroa River Hangaroa River (North Island)
- Native name: Hangaroa (Māori)

Location
- Country: New Zealand
- Island: North Island
- Region: Gisborne, Wairoa (Hawke's Bay)

Physical characteristics
- Source: Huiarau Ranges
  - location: Te Urewera, Waikareti North Conservation Area
  - coordinates: 38.5550°S 177.2710°E
- Mouth: Wairoa River
  - location: Te Reinga Falls
  - coordinates: 38°49′57″S 177°30′57″E

Basin features
- Progression: Hangaroa River → Wairoa River → Hawke Bay → Pacific Ocean
- Tributaries
  - left: Kiwhara Stream, Mutuera Stream, Mangaingoakore Stream, Parahinahina Stream, Pāpōkeka Stream, Paopao Stream, Mangatete Stream, Waikura River, Mangawehi Stream, Mangaihu Stream, Kaikōura Stream, Mangatōtara Stream, Mangamate Stream, Mangaotara Stream, Tūturi Stream
  - right: Kiwhara Stream, Te Kahakaha Stream, Okamataka Stream, Mangaone Stream, Taomatiherangi Stream, Pōnui Stream, Karuai Stream, Tahungataua Stream, Mangatumaru Stream, Kaikino Stream, Mangamōteo Stream, Mangapiopio Stream, Wharetī Stream, Ngāwhakatarara Stream, Tūmokonui Stream, Ruakituri River
- Waterfalls: Te Reinga Falls
- Bridges: Hollywood Bailey Bridge, Te Reinga Bridge

The Hangaroa River is a river in the Gisborne and Wairoa districts of New Zealand. Its source is the Huiarau Ranges in Te Urewera and Waikareti North Conservation Area, and flows southeast to merge with the Ruakituri River near Te Reinga. After Te Reinga Falls, the Hangaroa River flows into a basin which is the start of the Wairoa River. The Wairoa River flows south into Hawke Bay.

== Fauna ==
Rainbow trout populate the upper reaches. The upper river has a rock and stone bed, and flows through native bush with pools and short stretches of rapids. The lower river flows through farmland and contains brown trout.

== See also ==
- List of rivers of New Zealand
