= Lake Waikaremoana =

Lake in the North Island of New Zealand

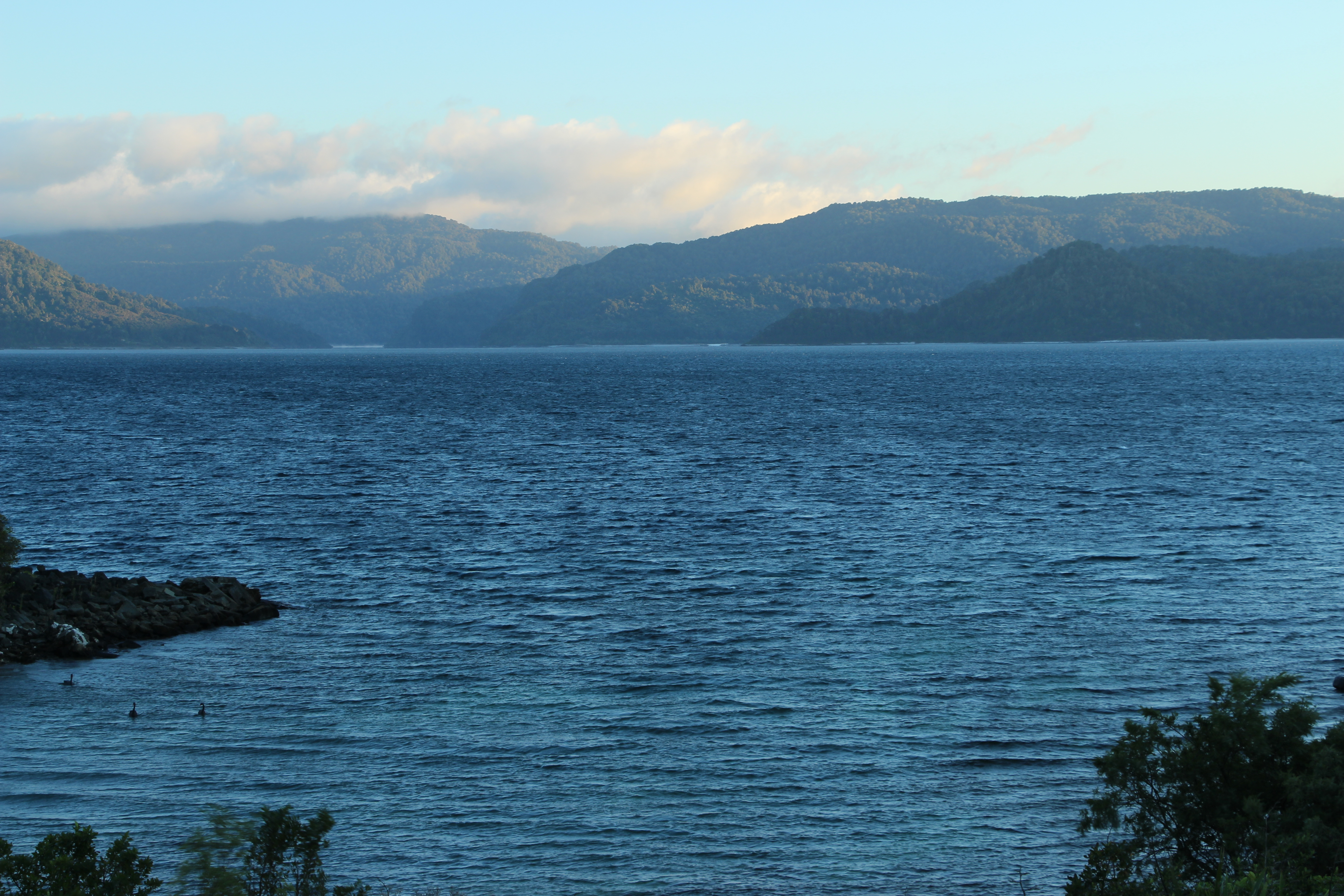
- Lake Waikaremoana (winter 2015)

- Location within North Island
- Interactive map of Lake Waikaremoana
- Location: Wairoa District, Hawke's Bay Region, North Island
- Coordinates: 38°46′S 177°05′E
- Primary outflows: Waikaretaheke River
- Basin countries: New Zealand
- Surface area: 54 km^{2} (21 sq mi)
- Average depth: 75 m (246 ft)
- Max. depth: 256 m (840 ft)
- Water volume: 4.06 km^{3} (0.97 cu mi)
- Shore length^{1}: 102.3 km (63.6 mi)
- Surface elevation: 600 m (2,000 ft)
- Settlements: Āniwaniwa
- ^{1} Shore length is not a well-defined measure.

Lake Waikaremoana is located in Te Urewera in the North Island of New Zealand, 60 kilometres (37 mi) northwest of Wairoa and 80 kilometres (50 mi) west-southwest of Gisborne. It covers an area of 54 square kilometres (21 sq mi). From the Māori Waikaremoana translates as 'sea of rippling waters'.

The lake lies within the tribal boundaries of Ngāi Tūhoe, Ngāti Ruapani and Ngāti Kahungunu ki Te Wairoa. The hamlet of Aniwaniwa and the Waikaremoana Holiday Park are located on the lakeshore, along SH38 (from Wai-O-Tapu via Murupara to Wairoa), which connects the lake to the central North Island (Rotorua) and Gisborne. There is a Department of Conservation office at Aniwaniwa. Several walks start here, including a short stroll to Āniwaniwa Falls.

The village of Onepoto is located on the lake's southern shores, close to the lake's old overflow channel and the intake of the Waikaremoana hydroelectric power scheme. The name Onepoto means short beach, and refers to the small bay to the north of the village with a beach only 60 metres (200 ft) long.

Lake Waikaremoana is a holiday destination for people who use the lake for fishing, tramping and other recreational activities. The Lake Waikaremoana Track, one of New Zealand's "Great Walks", is a three- to four-day tramp which follows approximately half of the lake's circumference. The track can be walked independently, or as part of a guided group. There are huts dotted on the walk which require booking to use. Camping is permitted unless you are more than 500 metres (1,600 ft) from the track.

The climate of the area is temperate In the summer and cool during the winters, snowfalls occur a few times a year in the region.

Numbers of visitors to the area are limited to some extent as a result of the extensive unsealed road that must be taken to reach it. This makes Lake Waikaremoana significantly less congested with tourists than the other nine Great Walks in New Zealand. The smaller Lake Waikareiti lies four kilometres to the northeast.

== Geography, natural history and climate ==
Waikaremoana, the North Island's deepest lake (256 m deep), has its surface at 600 metres (2,000 ft) above sea level. A huge landslide dam about 250 metres (800 ft) high formed the lake around 2,200 years ago. Before the landslip was sealed, around 1950, much of the lake outflow flowed through the landslip rather than out of an overflow at a low point in the slip.

Other geographical features include Panekiri Bluff and Puketukutuku Peninsula, which is the site of a kiwi-conservation programme. Surrounded by mountains clad with native forest which has never been logged, Waikaremoana retains ecological importance. Many native bird-species scarce in most other parts of the North Island occur in the area. A possum-hunting programme operates in the area to help protect the forest. Numerous understory species grow within the forested area of the catchment basin, crown fern (Lomaria discolor), for example. Since at least the early 1900s lake-bottom molluscs have been studied by Colenso (1811-1899) and others.

The climate of Lake Waikaremoana is temperate during the summer months and cool in the winter where snow events are not unheard of. Heavy rains affect the region, especially about late winter and early spring. The weather in the area is very changeable, trampers in the region need to be on the look out for dangerous weather conditions.

Climate data for Waikaremoana, elevation 643 m (2,110 ft), (1981–2010)
Month	Jan	Feb	Mar	Apr	May	Jun	Jul	Aug	Sep	Oct	Nov	Dec	Year
Mean daily maximum °C (°F)	21.4 (70.5)	21.3 (70.3)	19.4 (66.9)	15.9 (60.6)	13.0 (55.4)	10.5 (50.9)	9.3 (48.7)	10.5 (50.9)	12.9 (55.2)	15.2 (59.4)	17.5 (63.5)	19.6 (67.3)	15.5 (60.0)
Daily mean °C (°F)	16.3 (61.3)	16.4 (61.5)	14.8 (58.6)	12.1 (53.8)	9.7 (49.5)	7.3 (45.1)	6.2 (43.2)	7.0 (44.6)	8.9 (48.0)	10.7 (51.3)	12.8 (55.0)	15.0 (59.0)	11.4 (52.6)
Mean daily minimum °C (°F)	11.2 (52.2)	11.6 (52.9)	10.2 (50.4)	8.3 (46.9)	6.3 (43.3)	4.1 (39.4)	3.2 (37.8)	3.4 (38.1)	4.8 (40.6)	6.2 (43.2)	8.0 (46.4)	10.4 (50.7)	7.3 (45.2)
Average rainfall mm (inches)	135.0 (5.31)	158.1 (6.22)	230.9 (9.09)	177.9 (7.00)	173.5 (6.83)	201.2 (7.92)	176.0 (6.93)	192.6 (7.58)	210.7 (8.30)	146.4 (5.76)	118.2 (4.65)	196.5 (7.74)	2,117 (83.33)
Source: NIWA (rain 1971–2000)

== Māori History ==
The final shots of the New Zealand Wars were fired near Waikaremoana on 14 February 1872

The famed Māori Language scholar Tīmoti Kāretu was raised at Waimako Marae at Waikaremoana by his whāngai parents.

The Panekire Bluffs, a natural feature on the southern shores of the lake, became the namesake for 'Te Panekiretanga o Te Reo- Institute of Excellence in the Māori Language. This programme ran from 2004 to 2019 and was designed to train already fluent speakers of te reo Māori in higher language skills, such as whaikōrero, karanga, karakia, and wider command of vocabulary and delivery. Graduates of Te Panekiretanga o Te Reo include; Scotty Morrison (broadcaster), Leon Blake, Pānia Papa, Tama Potaka, Rāhui Papa, Hana O'Regan, Komene Cassidy, Paulette Taikawa-Ellife, Charisma Rangipuna, Paraone Gloyne, Rangi Mātāmua, Stacey Morrison, Mere Skerritt, Karyn Paringatai, and Eru Kapa-Kingi.

== Hydroelectric power scheme ==
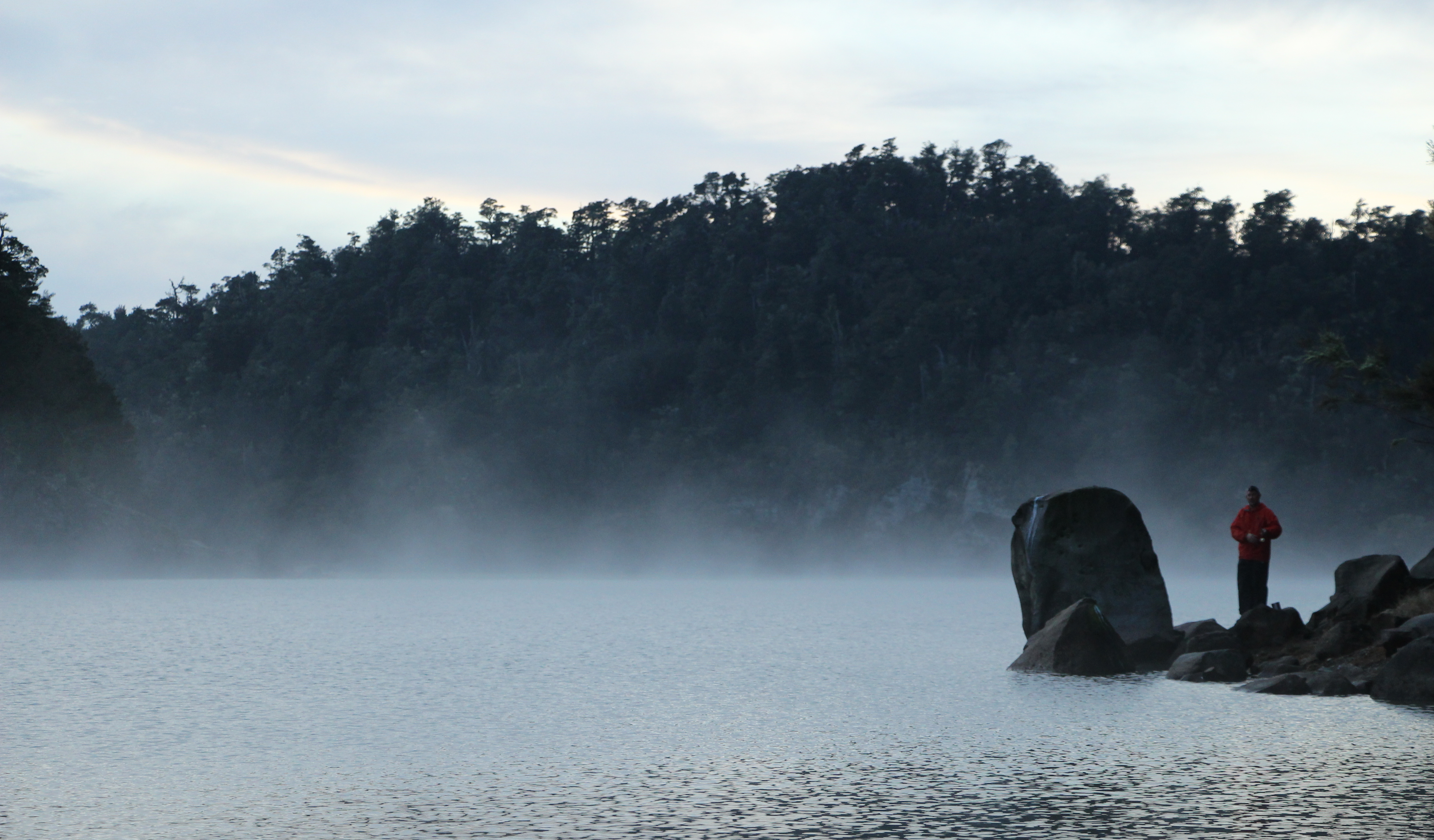
Fisherman on the lake shore

The Waikaremoana Hydroelectric Power Scheme is a rare example of a hydroelectric power station being built on a natural landslide dam. Another example is the Tortum Dam in Turkey.

=== Modifying the natural dam ===
The stability of the natural dam has been the subject of intense engineering review, both at the time of construction and subsequently. Construction of an outlet tunnel through the slip, which commenced in 1935, required extensive grouting around the control structures and throughout tunnel construction. Work was suspended at the end of 1936 because Bob Semple, the newly elected Minister for Public Works, wanted the tunnelling project reconsidered for "risk, cost and value". A new tunnelling scheme was devised in 1941 based on what had been learned from initial exploratory tunnelling and work recommenced in 1943 and continued for about five years because of continual problems with dewatering the tunnels. After the tunnels and intake headworks had been completed the natural dam was sealed for leaks on the lake side by removing submerged timber, a task that took a year and then applying 40,000 cubic metres (1,400,000 cu ft) of crushed rock and clay-like pumice in six layers, then covering those layers with a top layer of larger rock and spalls to protect the material from wave action. This sealing reduced the natural flow by about 80%. The sealing of the lake was only done after tunnelling was completed otherwise it would have caused the lake level to rise and make tunnelling more difficult. As it was, the lake level had to be lowered by temporary syphons to enable the construction of the headworks and make sealing of the natural dam easier.

=== Power stations ===
Although the Waikaretaheke River carries a flow of about 17 cubic metres per second (600 cu ft/s) from Lake Waikaremoana, the head of water through the three power stations, Kaitawa, Tuai, and Piripaua is around 450 metres (1,500 ft), allowing the stations to potentially generate 138 megawatts all up. The 250-metre (800 ft) head of water for the Kaitawa station is the highest for a power station in New Zealand and among the highest in the world.

== See also ==
- Lake Waikaremoana Great Walk
- Lakes of New Zealand
- List of lakes in New Zealand

== Gallery ==
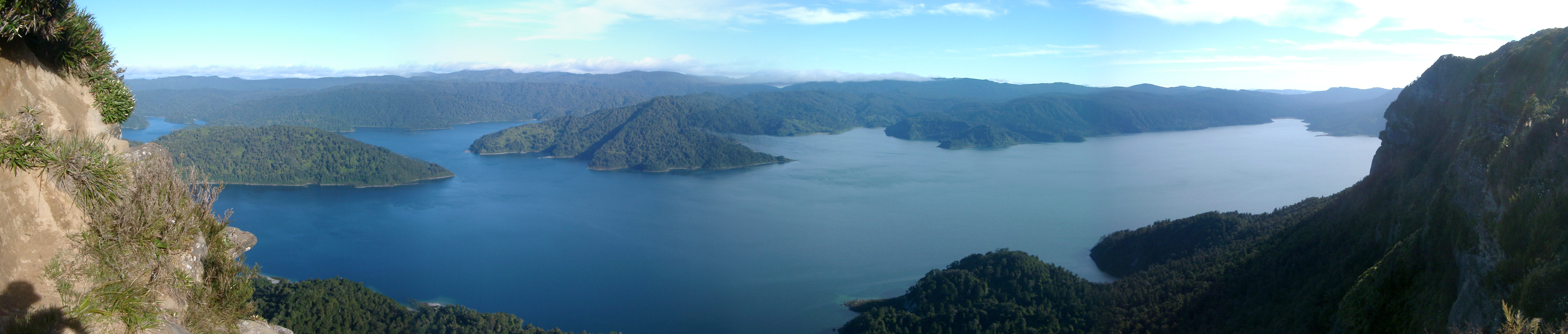
View of Lake Waikaremoana from Panekiri Bluff
