= Wairoa River (Hawke's Bay) =

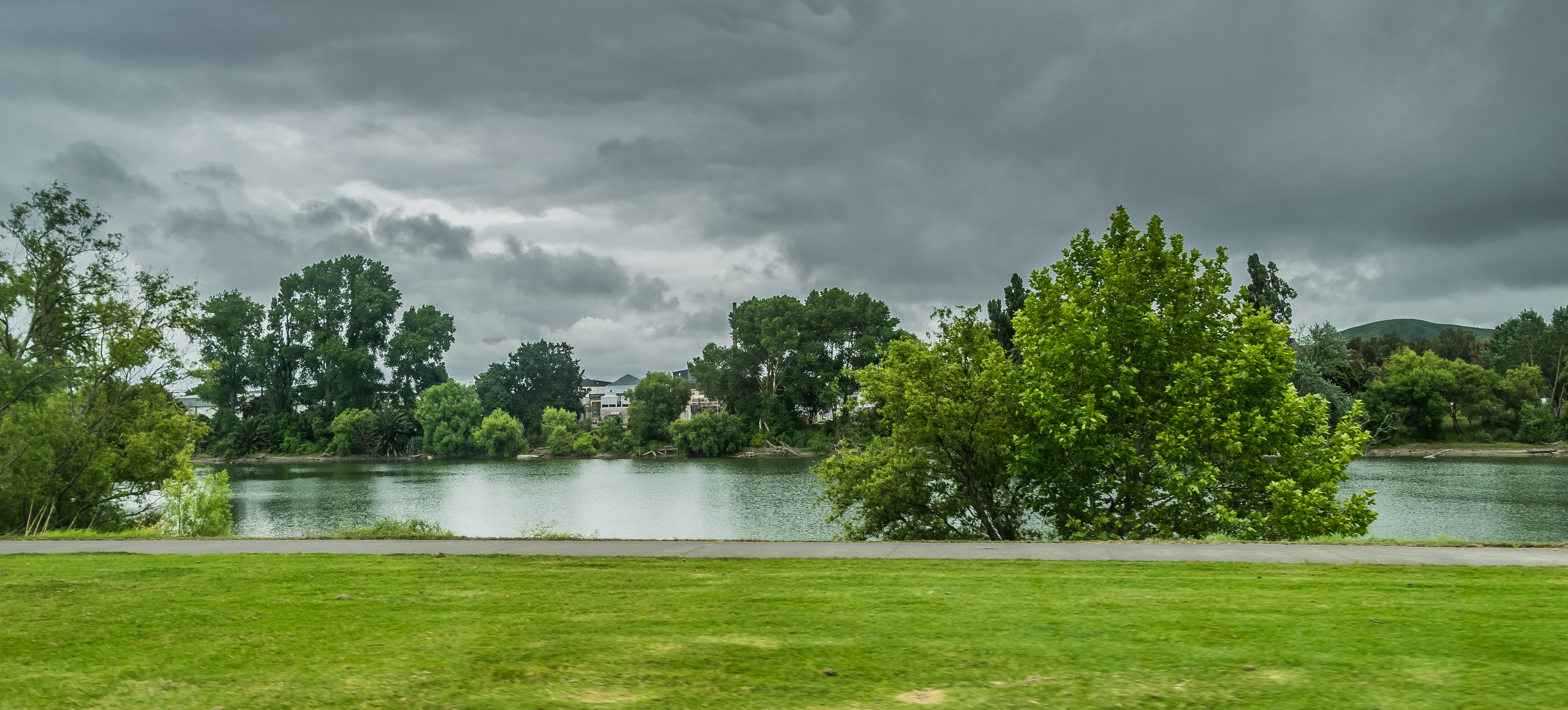
- Wairoa River seen in Wairoa township
- Route of the Wairoa River
- Mouth of the Wairoa River Wairoa River (Hawke's Bay) (North Island)
- Native name: Te Wairoa Hōpūpū Hōnengenenge Mātangi Rau (Māori)

Location
- Country: New Zealand
- Island: North Island
- Region: Hawke's Bay
- District: Wairoa

Physical characteristics
- Source: Hangaroa River
  - location: Te Reinga Falls
  - coordinates: 38.8324°S 177.5158°E
- Mouth: Hawke Bay
  - location: Whakamahi Lagoon
  - coordinates: 39°03′55″S 177°24′25″E
- Length: 65 km (40 mi)

Basin features
- Progression: Wairoa River → Hawke Bay → Pacific Ocean
- Tributaries
  - left: Te Kura Stream, Mangapōike River, Kauhauroa Stream, Awatere Stream
  - right: Omatira Stream, Mākareao Stream, Mangaaruhe River, Mangaohoi Stream, Waiau River, Huramua Stream, Hōnui Stream
- Bridges: Frasertown Bridge, Wairoa Bridge

The Wairoa River of the Hawke's Bay region in New Zealand is located in the inland east coast region of the North Island, west of Gisborne, before flowing into northern Hawke Bay at the town of Wairoa.

The full Māori name of the river is Te Wairoa Hōpūpū Hōnengenenge Mātangi Rau, which means the long, bubbling, swirling, uneven waters. The Wairoa River and its tributaries are vital for mahinga kai and hold high cultural value for Māori iwi and hapū of Te Rohe o Te Wairoa, many of whom report an overwhelming sense of spiritual connection when they are at the river.

== System ==
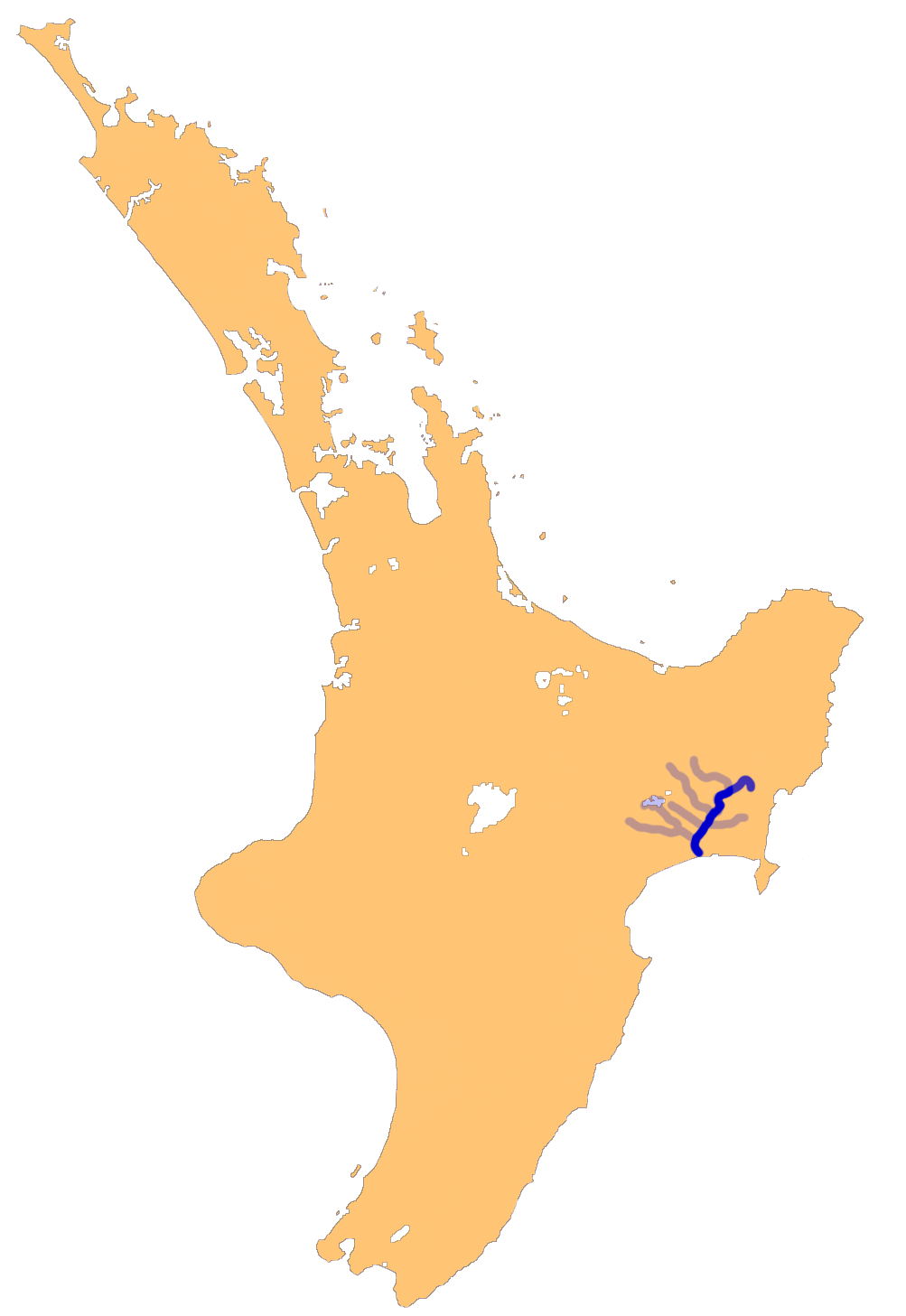
The Wairoa River system

It has a catchment area of 1,415 square miles (3,660 km^{2}), which includes Lake Waikaremoana, and runs south for 65 km (40 mi).

The major tributaries are:

- the Hangaroa River
- the Ruakituri River
- the Mangapoike River
- the Mangaaruhe River
- the Waiau River
- the Waikaretaheke River

The Hangaroa River and the Ruakituri River merge before Te Reinga Falls, near Te Reinga. The Wairoa River begins after the falls.

Lake Waikaremoana is formed in the rockfall-dammed headwaters of the Waikaretaheke River. It has a confluence with the Waiau River 22.5 km (14.0 mi) from the coast.

== Sediment and erosion ==
The Wairoa River carries large quantities of fine sediment (clays, silts and sands) that cloaks both the bed and the banks of the river. The rate of sediment loss has increased because of changes in land use from native forest to pasture, and forestry and farming land use practices, with current sediment losses estimated to be approximately 240% higher than before human arrival.

In 2023, an assessment of the lower Wairoa River, downstream of Marumaru, suggested that the river had a gravel (or bedrock) bed down to Awamate until about 3000 years ago. It remains unclear whether it was gravel-bed before widespread land cover change around 100 years ago. The lower river (downstream of Awamate) is most likely naturally soft-bottomed.

A 2023 study estimated that erosion control measures on land could reduce sediment loads in the river by up to 60%, improving visual clarity and creating better conditions for sensitive fish species. However, this would result in significant economic impacts, including reduction in farm revenue and employment.

== Extreme weather events ==
In 1948 a big flood of the Wairoa River submerged the traffic bridge in Wairoa and flooded parts of the town to a depth of 3 feet (0.91 m). This flood flow is one of the largest recorded for any river in New Zealand. The river rose to a "record height", the bridge "took a battering", and "telephone lines 4.3 metres above road level were carrying grass and twigs, showing the phenomenal rise of the floodwaters".

Cyclone Gabrielle resulted in erosion of stream banks, removal of riparian vegetation, and stream-bed disturbance in Wairoa River.

== Walkway ==
In 2010, the Wairoa Township River Walkway project commenced. The Walkway is a pedestrian and cycle path starting at the bridge on the south bank of the Wairoa River. It is planned that it will eventually completely encircle the town.

== Panorama ==
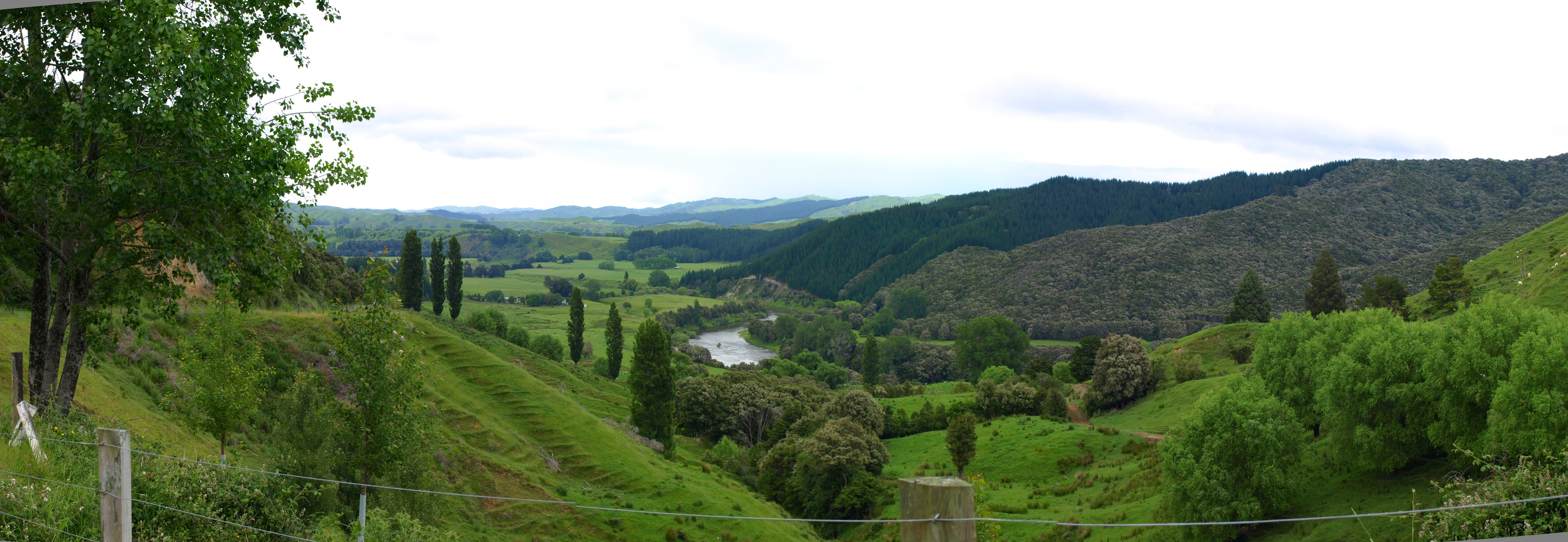
Wairoa River Valley between Te Reinga and Frasertown.
