= Tama Huata =

New Zealand Māori performing arts leader

Tama Huata ONZM
- Born: Tama Tūranga Huata; 15 April 1950
- Died: 11 February 2015 (aged 64); Napier, New Zealand
- Spouse: Pukepuke Tangiora Huata
- Children: Three
- Relatives: Wiremu Te Tau Huata (father); Hemi Pititi Huata (grandfather); Paraire Tomoana (grandfather); Henare Tomoana (great-grandfather)

Tama Tūranga Huata ONZM (15 April 1950 – 11 February 2015) was a Māori performing arts leader in New Zealand.

== Biography ==
Born in 1950 of Ngāti Kahungunu and Ngāti Porou descent, Huata was the third son of Wiremu Te Tau Huata—a chaplain to the Māori Battalion during World War II—and Ringahora Hēni Ngākai Ybel Tomoana. His maternal grandfather was Paraire Tomoana, the composer of "Pokarekare Ana".

Huata was a central figure in the renaissance of the Māori performing arts. In 1983 he founded the Kahurangi Dance Theatre and Te Wānanga Whare Tapere o Takitimu (the Takitimu Performing Arts School), and was responsible for the establishment there of the first degree programme in Māori performing arts. In 1985 he was a group leader at the Te Maori exhibition in San Francisco. Awarded a Fulbright scholarship in 1995, Huata travelled to the University of Wisconsin–Milwaukee to study African history and dance.

Huata was the inaugural chair of Te Matatini Society, and founder of the Waiata Māori Music Awards in 2007.

In the 2006 Queen's Birthday Honours, Huata was appointed an Officer of the New Zealand Order of Merit, for services to Māori performing arts. In 2012, he received Te Tohu Toi Kē (the "Making a Difference" award) from Creative New Zealand at Te Waka Toi Awards, for his significant contribution to the development and retention of Māori arts and culture.

Huata died at his home in Napier in 2015.
