= Henare Tomoana =

New Zealand politician (died 1904)

The Honourable Henare Tomoana
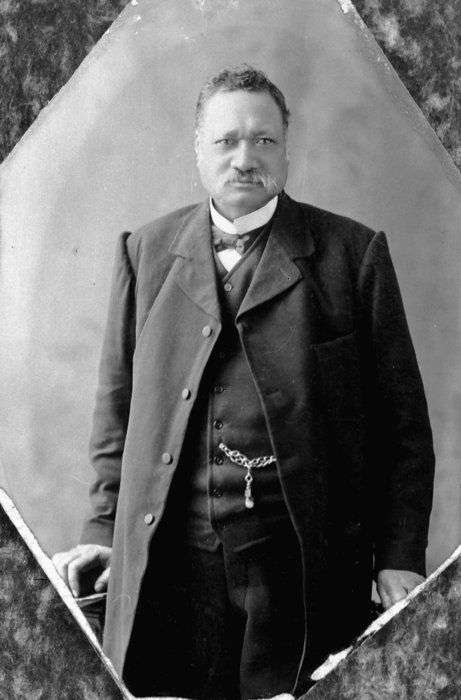

Member of the New Zealand Parliament for Eastern Maori
- In office 1879–1884
- Preceded by: Karaitiana Takamoana
- Succeeded by: Wi Pere

Member of the New Zealand Legislative Council
- In office 24 June 1898 – 20 February 1904

1st Speaker of the House of Te Kotahitanga (Māori Parliament)
- In office June 1892 – 1902

Member of Te Kotahitanga (Māori Parliament)
- In office June 1892 – 1902

Personal details
- Born: 1820/30s Heretaunga Plains, Hawke's Bay, New Zealand
- Died: 20 February 1904
- Party: Independent
- Spouse(s): Ataneta Rukare, Akenehi Patoka
- Children: Paraire Tomoana
- Profession: Soldier, politician, journalist

Military service
- Allegiance: Ngāti Kahungunu
- Battles/wars: New Zealand Wars; East Cape War; Te Kooti's War: Wairoa Expedition; Te Porere Redoubt

Henare Tomoana (1820/30s – 20 February 1904) was a prominent Māori leader and politician from the Hawke's Bay area in the North Island, New Zealand. He was of Ngāti Kahungunu and Ngāti Te Whatu-i-Apiti tribal lineage. In 1879 he was elected to the New Zealand Parliament for the Eastern Maori electorate, and in 1898 was appointed to the New Zealand Legislative Council. He was a convenor of Te Kotahitanga, the movement for an independent Māori Parliament.

== Early life ==
Tomoana was born in the 1820s or early 1830s, probably on the Heretaunga Plains, near the present day city of Hastings. He was the third son of Te Rotohenga (also called Winipere) from her second marriage to Hira Te Ota. Through his mother's first marriage, Tomoana was a younger half-brother of Karaitiana Takamoana and Te Meihana Takihi. His whakapapa links him to Ngāti Hawea as his principal hapu, with connections also to Ngāti Hinetahu, Ngāti Te Rehunga, and Ngāti Hori.

Little is known of Tomoana's early life or education. Around the time of his childhood, several wars were fought to repel invasions of Heretaunga, and many people from that area took refuge at Māhia Peninsula, not returning to Heretaunga until after 1838.

== Marriages and children ==
By 1852 Tōmoana had become a Christian, taking the name Hēnare at baptism. The identity of his first wife is unknown, however his second wife, whom he married on 18 October 1852, was Ataneta Rukarei. They had no children. His third wife, Ākenehi Patoka, was a landowner and an important leader in her own right. Together they had 13 children, including Paraire Tomoana, who later became a prominent Māori leader, composer and scholar. Only two of his 13 children survived him.

== Military leadership and land disputes ==
In the 1850s and 1860s, The Crown was acquiring land in Hawke's Bay very rapidly. As a prominent Māori chief, Tomoana was involved in many of the sales. In 1851 he, along with his father and brothers, had signed deeds for the sale of major land blocks in Ahuriri (now the city of Napier) and at Waipukurau. He also took part in the sale of the Matau-a-Maui (Cape Kidnappers) block in 1855.

Despite his own involvement in the sale of land, Tomoana was alarmed by the rate of Māori land loss in Hawke's Bay in the 1850s. In 1856 he joined is elder half-brother Karaitiana Takamoana in an attempt to bridle the rate at which land was being sold by Te Hapuku, another powerful Māori leader from the same area. Eventually their attempt led to open conflict, and between 1857-58 Tomoana fought against Te Hapuku in a war at Te Pakiaka, near Whakatu. During this time he accrued large debts to European store owners, and was forced to lease or sell land to repay what he had owed. By 1867 he had sold a large block at Wahaparata (near the present day site of Havelock North) and had leased over 17,000 acres of land in the Heretaunga Plains to Thomas Tanner for an initial annual sum of £600.

Regardless of his alarm over the rapidity of Māori land loss in Hawke's Bay, Tomoana was loyal to The Crown. In 1866, he and other Māori leaders joined forces with the Hawke's Bay Division of the Colonial Defence Force, to repel an attack by the Pai Mārire at the Battle of Omarunui. Then in 1868, he took command of a contingent of Māori troops from the Heretaunga-Tamatea region and supported the government's pursuit of Te Kooti up the Ruakituri River toward Wairoa. In December 1868 he fought at the Battle of Makaretu, helping to repel Te Kooti's incursion into the Poverty Bay area.

In 1869, Tomoana again led troops in pursuit of Te Kooti, who was now being pursued in the area around Taupō. On 10 September 1869, he was camped at Tauranga-Taupō with 120 men when Te Kooti's force of about 280 mounted a pre-emptive strike against him. Te Kooti succeeded in capturing Tomoana's horses and much of his equipment, but was forced to retreat under heavy fire. On 25 September, Tomoana joined forces with Hohepa Tamamutu of Ngāti Tūwharetoa, and succeeded in driving Te Kooti from Te Ponanga near Lake Rotoaira. On 4 October, he led the Ngāti Kahungunu contingent against Te Kooti's redoubt at the Battle of Te Pōrere. The battle was a joint effort by Tomoana, Te Keepa Te Rangihiwinui of Te Arawa, and Major Thomas McDonnell who led the government forces. The storming of the redoubt was successful, and Te Kooti was wounded during the battle. Tomoana then returned to Napier due to a lack of supplies.

For his campaigns against Te Kooti, Tomoana (who had been commissioned as a captain of militia) received a Sword of Honour. However, he did not receive regular pay, as the Hawke's Bay superintendent, John Davies Ormond, claimed that the government could not afford it. By this time Tomoana was deeply in debt, at least some of which had been incurred in equipping his troops. By December 1869 he owed more than £3,000. He was subsequently forced to sell his share of the Heretaunga block in order to settle his debt. He had been one of ten chiefs granted joint ownership of the Heretaunga block by the Native Land court. The sale of his share led to the eventual loss of the entire Heretaunga block, where the city of Hastings now stands.

== Political activism and repudiation movement ==
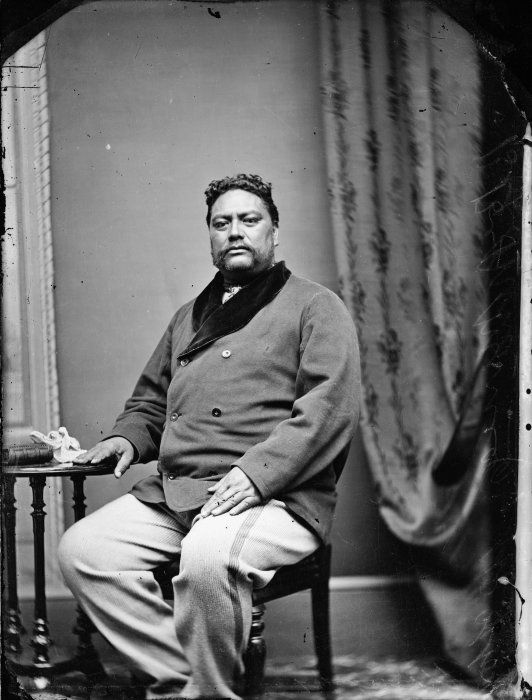
Portrait of Tomoana by Samuel Carnell, 1873.

The rapid sale of Māori land in Hawke's Bay led to the emergence of "the Hawke's Bay repudiation movement". The movement was an attempt to dispute the legitimacy of past land sales that, even at the time, had been criticised as unscrupulous. At a meeting at Pakowhai in July 1872 Tomoana proposed that all land grievances should be taken to Wellington to be heard in the Native Land Court, while Karaitiana Takamoana called for a commission of inquiry.

A commission of inquiry was appointed, but it was considered by Māori to be a great disappointment. Many claims were not heard, no action was or could be taken, and the commission found that mortgages and the acquisition of tribal property through pressure on indebted grantees were legitimate actions. From April 1873 Tomoana was fully committed to repudiation. The movement's aims were to create a petition demanding a new commission with greater powers, and to work for a change of government. The Auckland lawyer John Sheehan was a supporter of the repudiation movement and criticised many of the past land sales in the region as "iniquitous".

Tomoana's greatest contribution to repudiation was to set up, publish and edit a Māori newspaper called Te Wananga, at Pakowhai. The first issue emerged on 5 August 1874, and it continued, usually weekly, until December 1878. From sometime in 1875 it was edited by John White. The first few numbers, published in Māori only, contained Tomoana's explanations of the paper's purpose. It was hoped to educate its readers about European business practices, and provide contact between Māori and European concepts. The paper discussed land selling and leasing, mortgages, reserves and Crown grants. Controversial land cases were reported, many of which concerned Tomoana.

In June 1876 a meeting of chiefs was held at Pakowhai, and Tomoana was its host. The meeting expressed loyalty to the Queen, but called for unification of the tribes, yearly meetings of chiefs, an increase in Māori members of Parliament, and the reform of Māori land law. Tomoana repeated his 1872 support for the continuance of the Native Land Court, and suggested that fuller use be made of existing protective clauses in Māori land law, saying that Parliament was unlikely to accept new proposals. He was supported by Karaitiana Takamoana and Henare Matua, and advised by John Sheehan, who was soon to become the native minister in government.

== Parliamentary career ==
New Zealand Parliament
Years	Term	Electorate	Party
1879	6th	Eastern Maori	Independent
1879–1881	7th	Eastern Maori	Independent
1881–1884	8th	Eastern Maori	Independent

Tomoana's elder half-brother Karaitiana Takamoana was elected to parliament for the Eastern Maori electorate in 1871, and served until his death in 1879. Tomoana contested the by-election held in July 1879 to fill the seat. He beat Henare Matua and Ieni Tapsell to become the third member of parliament for the Eastern Maori electorate. He was initially a supporter of the ministry of Sir George Grey, but soon became increasingly disillusioned. In 1879 he voted against Grey in a vote of no-confidence. Grey called an election, and in October was replaced as Premier by John Hall. Tomoana was, for 17 days, a member of the Executive Council in Hall's administration.

As an ordinary member of Parliament he made little impact. Like other contemporary Māori members he was hampered by a lack of fluent English, but he gained valuable experience in parliamentary procedure and European politics. In 1882 he succeeded in getting through to its second reading a bill to set up local Māori committees with power to adjudicate on land titles. This bill led directly to the 1883 Native Committees Act which gave committees the authority to advise the Native Land Court, and to arbitrate between Māori disputants in some matters if the disputing parties consented. However, because they were regional rather than tribal and had insufficient powers, these committees were not acceptable to most Māori.

As a member of parliament, Tomoana's influence among Māori grew. He was sometimes called on to resolve disputes. In 1880 he intervened in a land dispute between Ngati Rakai-paaka of Nuhaka and Ngati Hine of Whakaki and was able to arrange a temporary peace in which discussions could continue. He intervened with less immediate success in a land dispute between John Harding and Heta Tiki of Waipawa, but the case was eventually resolved in favour of the Māori owners.

In the 1884 election, Tomoana was defeated by Wi Pere, and returned to his role as a chief and leader in Hawke's Bay. In 1886, with Renata Kawepo, he set up a meeting in Hastings to discuss the forthcoming Native Land Administration Bill with John Ballance, the native minister. As the first Māori spokesperson Tomoana reviewed past land legislation, concluding that all of it had brought harm to Māori, and asked that they be given more control over their affairs. Ballance's Native Land Administration Act 1886 established block committees, but they were generally regarded with suspicion, partly because it was feared that the proceeds of the land would be swallowed up in the committees' costs.

The death of Renata Kawepo in 1888 left Tomoana the senior Heretaunga chief of his generation. In May 1891 in Waipawa he gave evidence to the Native Land Laws Commission, pointing out that great injustices had resulted from laws imposed on Māori by the European-dominated Parliament, and asking that Māori be allowed to make their own laws. This request reflected Tomoana's growing involvement with Te Kotahitanga, the movement for an independent Māori parliament. Hāmiora Mangakāhia, several times premier of the Māori parliament, credited Tomoana with being one of the principal agents of its establishment. As chairman of the Waipatu marae committee, Tomoana welcomed Kotahitanga members to the June 1892 session there. His parliamentary skills were put to good use; he was elected Speaker of Te Kotahitanga. He was elected again in 1893, but resigned after a few days. He served as Speaker on subsequent occasions, but by the fourth session regarded himself as 'leader of the opposition' in the Kotahitanga parliament. There were no organised parties within the movement, but his chosen role was to provide opposing arguments on debated issues.

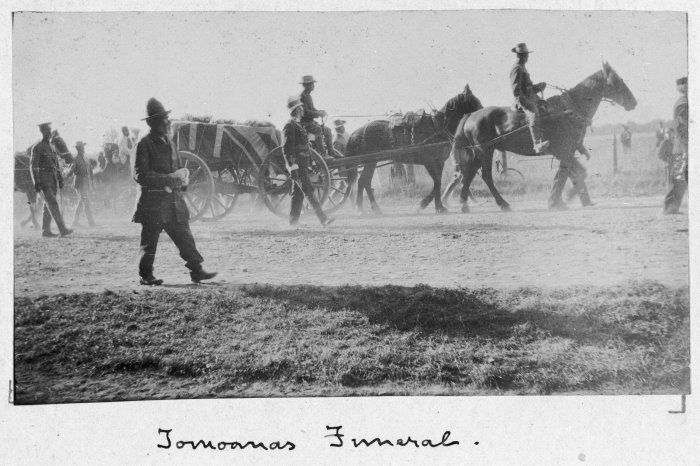
Henare Tomoana's funeral, 1904

As a member of Te Kotahitanga, Tomoana presented to the native minister in June 1893 a draft Federated Māori Assembly Empowering Bill, and a petition listing Māori grievances. The bill asked for power over Māori to be delegated to Te Kotahitanga, subject only to the Governor of New Zealand. In 1893 Tomoana took up the cause of Tuhoe, who were resisting the survey of their land, and circulated a petition on their behalf throughout Hawke's Bay. This action led the Premier Richard Seddon to release Tuhoe prisoners. In the 1898 session of the Kotahitanga parliament at Papawai in Wairarapa, the main item of business was discussion of Seddon's bill to set up Maori Land Boards, which threatened to further reduce Māori control of their land. Tomoana took a moderate line, accepting the bill as a basis for discussion, whereas most others regarded it as a violation of the rules and procedures of the Māori parliament.

In June 1898, Tomoana was appointed a member of the Legislative Council, a position he held until 20 February 1904 when he died.

New Zealand Parliament
Preceded by Karaitiana Takamoana	Member of Parliament for Eastern Maori; 1879–1884	Succeeded by Wi Pere
