= 1879 Eastern Maori by-election =

New Zealand by-election

The 1879 Eastern Maori by-election was a by-election held on 7 July in the Eastern Maori electorate during the 6th New Zealand Parliament.

The by-election was caused by the death on 24 February of the incumbent MP Karaitiana Takamoana.

The by-election was won by Henare Tomoana.

Henare Matua was seen by some as the "Government candidate" and a leader of the "Repudiation" faction.

== Results ==
The following table gives the election results:

1879 Eastern Maori by-election
Party	Candidate	Votes	%	±%
Independent	Henare Tomoana	652	37.84	
Independent	Henare Matua	583	33.84	
Independent	Hans Tapsell	429	24.90	
Independent	Henare Te Pukuatua	59	3.42	
Majority		69	4.00	
Turnout		1723		
