= Īhaka =

Īhaka or Ihaka is both a given name and a surname. It is a Māori transliteration of the name Isaac. Notable people with the name include:

== Given name ==
- Ihaka Hakuene (1836–1887), New Zealand tribal leader, lay reader, and politician
- Īhaka Takaanini (1800–1864), New Zealand tribal leader
- Īhaka Whaanga (died 1875), Ngati Rakaipaaka leader, assessor, military leader

== Surname ==
- Kīngi Īhaka (1921–1993), New Zealand Anglican priest
- Ross Ihaka (born 1954), New Zealand statistician
