= Ngāti Kahungunu =

Māori iwi (tribe) in Aotearoa New Zealand

- Iwi (tribe) in Māoridom
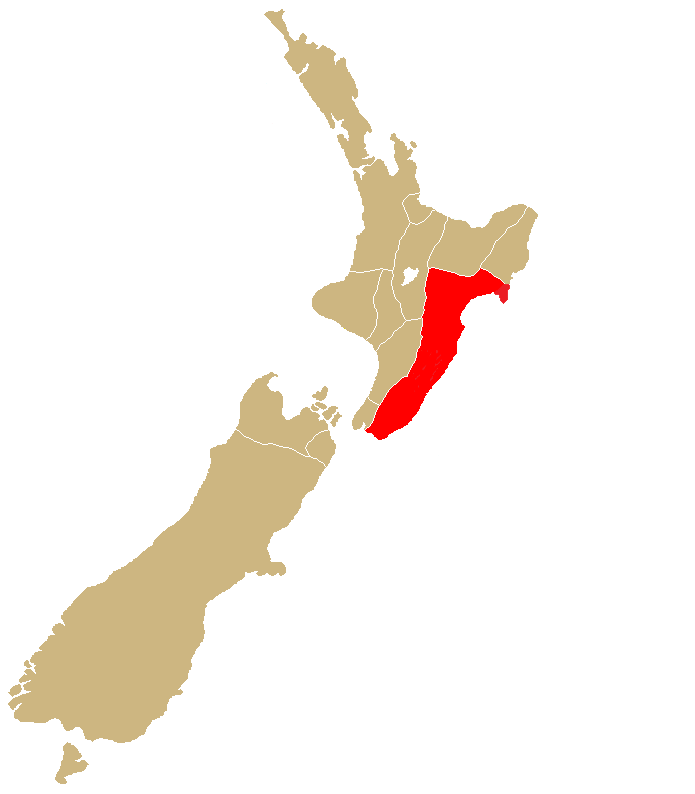
- Rohe (region): Hawke's Bay, and Wairārapa regions
- Waka (canoe): Tākitimu
- Population: 82,239 (c. 2018)
- Website: www.kahungunu.iwi.nz

Ngāti Kahungunu (Māori pronunciation: [ˈŋaːti ˈkahʉŋʉnʉ]) is a Māori iwi (tribe) located along the eastern coast of the North Island of New Zealand. The iwi is traditionally centred in the Hawke's Bay and Wairārapa regions. The Kahungunu iwi also comprises 86 hapū (sub-tribes) and 90 marae (meeting grounds).

The tribe is organised into six geographical and administrative divisions: Wairoa, Te Whanganui-ā-Orotū, Heretaunga, Tamatea, Tāmaki-nui-a Rua and Wairarapa. It is the 4th largest iwi in New Zealand by population, with 82,239 people identifying as Ngāti Kahungunu in the 2018 census.

== Early history ==
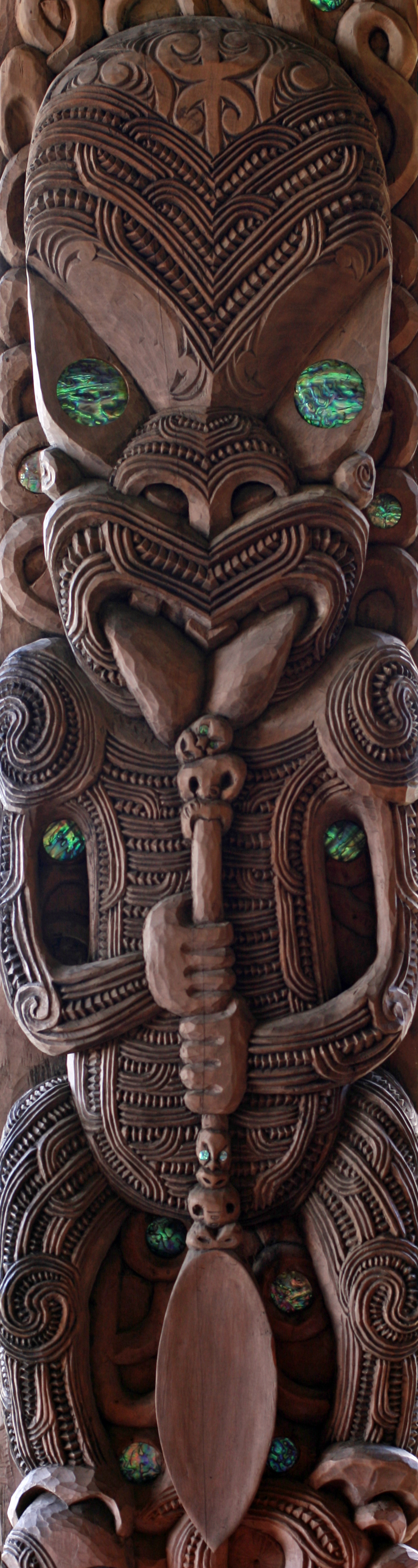
The ancestor Kahungunu depicted with the canoe paddle of a navigator

=== Pre-colonisation ===
Ngāti Kahungunu trace their origins to the Tākitimu waka, one of the Māori migration canoes which arrived on New Zealand's North Island around 1100–1200 AD, according to Ngāti Kahungunu traditions. According to local legend, Tākitimu and its crew were completely tapu. Its crew comprised men only: high chiefs, chiefs, tohunga and elite warriors. No cooked food was eaten before or during the voyage. The captain of Tākitimu was Tamatea Arikinui. He left the waka at Tauranga in the Bay of Plenty or at Tūranga, near modern-day Gisborne, travelling overland until he arrived at Ahuriri (now part of Napier) in the Hawke's Bay Region. The waka Tākitimu itself continued its voyage to the South Island under a new captain, Tahu Pōtiki, from whom the South Island iwi of Ngāi Tahu takes its name.

According to oral history, Kahungunu was the great-grandson of Tamatea Arikinui and was born in present-day Kaitaia. It has been widely recounted that Kahungunu travelled extensively through the North Island during his early adulthood, eventually settling on the East Coast of the North Island. He married several times during his travels, and as a result there are many North Island hapū that trace their lineage directly back to Kahungunu. Many of his marriages were arranged for diplomatic purposes, uniting various iwi against their enemies, forming bonds and securing peace. At some point, Kahungunu arrived at Māhia Peninsula, where he pursued and married Rongomaiwahine, a woman from Nukutaurua who was a chief in her own right. She was famously beautiful, and according to legend had issued a challenge to Kahungunu, insulting his charismatic reputation and inviting him to prove himself worthy of her. Kahungunu accepted the challenge, murdered her husband and, after numerous trials, succeeded in obtaining Rongomaiwahine's consent to marry. The iwi Ngāti Kahungunu and Ngāti Rongomaiwahine both descend from this marriage.

==== Heretaunga ====
The eldest son of Kahungunu and Rongomaiwahine was named Kahukura-nui. His children included two sons, Rākei-hikuroa and Rakai-pāka. Rākei-hikuroa wanted his favourite son Tū-purupuru to be pre-eminent chief over Ngāti Kahungunu. The twin sons of his nephew Kahutapere seemed to threaten this plan, so they were murdered. Kahutapere defeated Rakei-hikuroa at the Battle of Te Paepae o Rarotonga. After this, he led a migration of his families and followers from Nukutaurua on the Māhia Peninsula to Heretaunga, the region known today as Hawke's Bay. Accompanying Rākei-hikuroa from Māhia to Heretaunga was a son from one of his first marriage, Taraia. Not long after their arrival in Heretaunga, Taraia succeeded Rākei-hikuroa as the leader of their people, and he proved to be a proficient strategist in the struggle for dominance of the region, displacing the Whatumamoa, Rangitāne, Ngāti Awa, and elements of the Ngāti Tara iwi, which lived in Petane, Te Whanganui-ā-Orotu and Waiohiki. Within Taraia's lifetime, Heretaunga was brought under the control of his people, who became the first of the Ngāti Kahungunu in that area.

The descendants of Rākei-hikuroa split into various hapū. Allegiances shifted, and Māori geopolitics in the region was largely played out as an internal struggle for dominance among the hapū of Ngāti Kahungunu, broken up by intermittent raids from Ngāti Porou and repeated attempts by Ngāti Raukawa to settle in Heretaunga. Initially, the descendants of Rākei-hikuroa were divided between Te Hika a Ruarauhanga, the descendants of his first wife, and Te Hika a Pāpāuma, the descendants of his second. After four generations, this conflict was resolved, when Te Whatuiāpiti of Pāpāuma married Te Huhuti, of Ruarauhanga. Their courtship is considered to be one of the great romances of Māori tradition. Subsequently, a new conflict arose between his descendants, Ngāti Te Whatuiāpiti, and the descendants of Taraia, Ngāti Te Ūpokoiri. Ngāti Te Whatuiāpiti settled in the Kaimanawa ranges, but were driven out by Ngāti Tūwharetoa in a war in the sixteenth of seventeenth centuries.

Over time, some Ngāti Kahungunu hapū settled in the Wairarapa region, finding a relatively peaceful existence there until the arrival of European settlers.

==== Wairoa ====
When Rākei-hikuroa departed for Heretaunga, Rakai-pāka and his sister Hinemanuhiri remained in the Gisborne area, but they were subsequently defeated in battle and migrated south to the northern Hawke's Bay, where his descendants settled at Nūhaka and became the Ngāti Rakaipaaka hapū. Four generations later, their chief Te Huki solidified the hapū's position throughout the region with a series of diplomatic marriages, a process referred to as "setting the net of Te Huki", but was killed by Te Whānau-ā-Apanui.

Hinemanuhiri's son Tama-te-rangi took control of the Wairoa River valley from Ngāi Tauira and established Ngāi Tamaterangi. The chief Kotore is said to have coined the name Ngāti Kahungunu in the next generation, shortly before he was killed in an attack led by Te Whānau-ā-Apanui. The west and east banks of the Wairoa were split between the brothers Tapuwae Poharutanga o Tukutuku and Te Maaha, who fought one another, but were subsequently re-joined through intermarriage. In the late eighteenth century, their children, led by Te Kahu-o-te-rangi and Te-O-Tane, won a crushing victory over Te Whānau-ā-Apanui at the Battle of Whāwhāpō. After this, Ngāti Kahungunu's position in the northern Hawkes' Bay was secure. Later Te Kahu-o-te-rangi attempted to kill Te-O-Tane, but failed and they eventually reconciled.

=== Early 19th century ===
In 1807, the Musket Wars broke out as chiefs from the northern Ngāpuhi, now equipped with firearms, launched attacks on weaker tribes to the south. The ongoing conflict reached the east coast when, in 1822, a Ngāti Tūwharetoa war party led by Mananui Te Heuheu Tūkino II crossed into Ngāti Kahungunu territory. Armed with muskets, Te Heuheu had come to assist Ngāti Te Ūpokoiri in retaking their lost pā of Te Roto-a-Tara, a fortified island in Lake Roto-a-Tara near the present-day site of Te Aute in Heretaunga. The pā had historically been an important strategic asset of Ngāti Te Ūpokoiri, but it had recently been occupied by Tangiteruru, a Ngāti Porou chief who had invaded Heretaunga with the help of Ngāti Maru. After the arrival of Te Heuheu's war party, Tangiteruru abandoned the pā. However it was swiftly reoccupied by Te Pareihe, a young chief of Ngāti Te Whatuiāpiti. Te Heuheu laid siege to the pā but failed to capture it. After his brother was killed in a skirmish at nearby Waimarama, Te Heuheu abandoned his siege of Roto-a-Tara and raided the pā at Waimarama instead. Following this, he returned to Ngāti Tuwharetoa to regroup and prepare for a second assault on Te Roto-a-Tara. Returning weeks later, Te Heuheu was joined by a Ngāti Raukawa war party led by Te Whatanui, and together they devised a plan to assault the island fortress. They constructed a causeway enabling them to make the crossing from the shore of the lake to Te Roto-a-Tara pā. Te Pareihe commanded such a strong resistance in the ensuing battle that Te Heuheu and Te Whatanui were thrown back in total defeat, with the loss of over 500 chiefs. Te Pareihe abandoned Te Roto-a-Tara after the battle and moved to Pōrangahau.

Although he had beaten back a superior force at Te Roto-a-Tara, Te Pareihe knew that the defence of Heretaunga was unsustainable without the advantage of firearms. He and fellow Ngāti Kahungunu chief Tiakitai forged an alliance with Te Wera Hauraki, a chief from Ngāpuhi who had settled on the Māhia Peninsula. Together, their forces retook Te Roto-a-Tara pā from Ngāi Te Upokoiri, who had occupied the fortress island after Te Pareihe escaped to Pōrangahau. But when news reached the alliance that a huge coalition of Waikato and Tūwharetoa warriors were amassing to attack Heretaunga, Te Wera agreed to protect Te Pareihe and the Ngāti Kahungunu at his fortress settlement in Māhia. Hence, in late 1823, Te Pareihe led an exodus of Ngāti Kahungunu refugees from Heretaunga to Māhia, setting off from the beach at Waimarama. Some chiefs, such as Kurupo Te Moananui, Te Hapuku, and Tiakitai, remained in Heretaunga, but most joined the exodus. By the late 1830s hostilities had ended and the Ngāti Kahungunu diaspora began returning to Heretaunga.

In 1840 a number of Ngāti Kahungunu chiefs were signatories to the Treaty of Waitangi.

=== Colonisation ===
The spread of European settlement eventually reached Ngāti Kahungunu territory, and led to the rapid acquisition of Māori land by The Crown during the 1850s and 1860s. Chiefs from the Heretaunga area, such as Te Hapuku and Henare Tomoana lost significant areas of land in sales that have since been labelled "extortionate", and which later became matters of dispute and protest. The loss of land during this period led to the emergence of the Repudiation Movement, a coalition of Ngāti Kahungunu leaders who sought to halt the rapidity of land loss in the region, and to dispute past sales.

In 1868 the Eastern Maori electorate was established in the New Zealand Parliament to provide parliamentary representation for Māori in the east of the North Island, an area encompassing Ngāti Kahungunu. The first representatives for the electorate were Ngāti Kahungunu chiefs Tāreha Te Moananui (1868–1871), Karaitiana Takamoana (1871–1879), and Henare Tomoana (1879–1881). The effectiveness of Māori parliamentary representation during this period was hampered by a lack of fluent English on the part of the elected Māori representatives, and by a lack of confidence in the European parliamentary system itself, which was seen as incapable of protecting Māori interests. As a result, the Kotahitanga movement emerged in the 1890s to advocate for the establishment of an independent Māori parliament. It convened parliamentary style meetings at Pāpāwai Marae in Wairārapa and at Waipatu in Heretaunga, where key issues of importance for Māori were debated. However, by 1902 Te Kotahitanga had failed to gain recognition from the New Zealand Parliament and was therefore dissolved in favour of local Māori Councils, which were established in 1900.

== 20th-century history ==
=== Political leadership ===
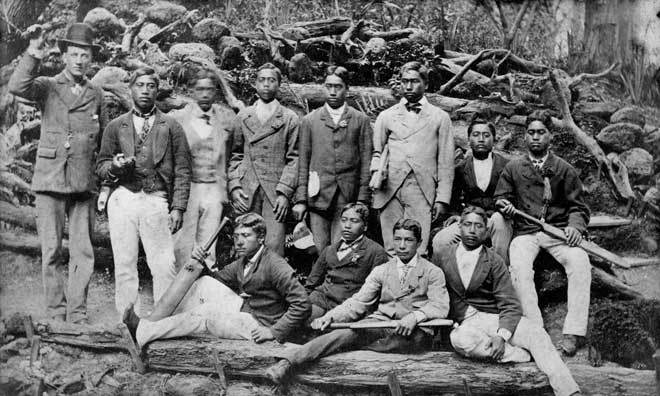
Students at Te Aute College in 1880

At the outset of the 20th century, a new generation of Māori leaders were beginning to participate in the Ngāti Kahungunu political landscape. Te Aute College had opened in 1854 near Hastings, and in the 1880s and 1890s it was attended by Āpirana Ngata, Māui Pōmare, Te Rangi Hīroa (Sir Peter Buck), and Paraire Tomoana. In 1897 they formed the Te Aute College Students' Association and became active participants in public life, often mediating between the Crown and hapū in matters of local land management. In 1909 the group was joined by James Carroll and became known as the Young Māori Party. Hukarere Girls’ College and St Joseph's Māori Girls' College were also established within the region.

=== First World War ===
When the First World War broke out in 1914, a number of Māori leaders responded by committing the support of their respective hapū and iwi. Alumni of the Young Māori Party, some of whom were now parliamentarians, were generally in favour of Māori enlistment and were involved in recruitment campaigns. Āpirana Ngata and Māui Pōmare were the most aggressive proponents of Māori enlistment, and in Ngāti Kahungunu they received the support of Paraire Tomoana, who was the son of the chief Henare Tomoana. Tomoana worked with Ngata to drive Māori recruitment campaigns both within Ngāti Kahungunu and throughout other areas of the North Island.

Many men from Ngāti Kahungunu were among the Māori who enlisted for war. They were organised into the New Zealand (Māori) Pioneer Battalion. The battalion participated in the Gallipoli campaign in 1915 and the Western Front between 1916 and 1918. In January 1918 Paraire Tomoana published the words of E Pari Ra, a piece written for soldiers lost in battle. After the war this tune was adopted by the Royal New Zealand Navy as their official slow march. Other songs composed by Tomoana were Tahi nei taru kino, I runga o ngā puke, Hoki hoki tonu mai, Hoea rā te waka nei, Pōkarekare ana, and the haka Tika tonu. The songs have since become treasured anthems of Ngāti Kahungunu, and in some cases were adopted by other iwi due to their wartime popularity.

=== Second World War ===
After the outbreak of the Second World War in 1939, many men from Ngāti Kahungunu again enlisted and fought overseas, primarily with the 28th (Māori) Battalion. Soldiers from the Ngāti Kahungunu region were generally organised into 'D' Company of the battalion, along with men from Waikato, Maniapoto, Wellington and the South Island. Additionally, 'D' Company also consisted of some soldiers from the Pacific Islands, and from the Chatham Islands and Stewart Island. The battalion fought in the Greek, North African and Italian campaigns, during which it earned a formidable reputation as an extremely effective fighting force. It was also the most decorated New Zealand battalion of the war. Following the end of hostilities, the battalion contributed a contingent of personnel to serve in Japan as part of the British Commonwealth Occupation Force, before it was disbanded in January 1946. Wiremu Te Tau Huata was a well known officer from Ngāti Kahungunu, having served as the Māori Battalion's military chaplain.

=== Late 20th century ===
By 1946 only a small percentage of land in the Ngāti Kahungunu region had been retained by Māori, and the traditional agrarian communities at the core of Māori society were beginning to break down as returned servicemen found employment and settled in urban areas, such as Wairoa, Napier, Hastings, and Masterton. By the year 1966, 70% of Māori men (throughout New Zealand in general) were now working in urban employment centres, particularly freezing works, sawmills, the transport industry (including road maintenance), the construction industry, and various types of factory work. In Hawke's Bay, thousands of Māori worked at the Whakatu and Tomoana freezing works sites, near Hastings. However the regional economy and well-being of the Māori community was profoundly impacted when both plants closed; Whakatu in 1986 and Tomoana in 1994.

== Taiwhenua and hapū ==
The iwi contains a total of 86 hapū. For administrative purposes they can be divided into six taiwhenua (regions), from north to south: Wairoa, Te Whanganui-a-Orotū, Heretaunga, Tamatea, Tāmaki nui-ā-Rua, and Wairarapa. Several hapū are found in multiple taiwhenua.

Wairoa is roughly equivalent to the Wairoa District, containing the area south of the Wharerata Ranges at Poverty Bay, including the Wairoa River and the Māhia Peninsula. There are twenty-six hapū:

- Kurahikakawa
- Mātawhaiti
- Ngāi Rākatō
- Ngāi Tamaterangi
- Ngāi Tānemitirangi
- Ngāi Te Apatu
- Ngāi Te Ipu
- Ngāi Te Kapuamātotoru
- Ngāi Tū
- Ngāti Hine
- Ngāti Hinehika (Ngāti Kōhatu)
- Ngāti Hinemihi
- Ngāti Hinepua
- Ngāti Hingānga (Te Aitanga o Pourangahua)
- Ngāti Kahu
- Ngāti Kurupakiaka
- Ngāti Mākoro
- Ngāti Mātangirau
- Ngāti Mihi
- Ngāti Moewhare
- Ngāti Pāhauwera
- Ngāti Peehi
- Ngāti Tama
- Rākaipaaka
- Rongomaiwahine
- Ruapani

Te Whanganui-a-Orotū covers the area roughly from the Mohaka River down to the Ngaruroro River (i.e. the northern part of Hastings District plus Napier). There are fifteen hapū:

- Marangatūhetaua (Ngāti Tū)
- Ngā Hau E Whā
- Ngāi Tātara
- Ngāi Tāwhao
- Ngāi Te Ruruku ki Tangoio
- Ngāti Hinepare
- Ngāti Hineuru
- Ngāti Hōri
- Ngāti Kurumōkihi (Ngāi Tātara)
- Ngāti Māhu
- Ngāti Matepu
- Ngāti Pārau
- Ngāti Toaharapaki
- Ngāti Tū
- Ngāti Whakaari

Heretaunga is roughly equivalent to the part of Hastings District south of the Ngaruroro River, including Hastings. There are twenty-seven hapū:

- Ngāi Te Rangikoianake
- Ngāi Te Ūpokoiri
- Ngāti Hāwea
- Ngāti Hikatoa
- Ngāti Hinemanu
- Ngāti Hinemoa
- Ngāti Honomōkai
- Ngāti Hōri
- Ngāti Hōtoa
- Ngāti Kautere
- Ngāti Kurukuru
- Ngāti Mahuika
- Ngāti Mihiroa
- Ngāti Ngarengare
- Ngāti Paki
- Ngāti Papatuamāro
- Ngāti Pōporo
- Ngāti Rahunga
- Ngāti Tamakopiri
- Ngāti Tamaterā
- Ngāti Taraia
- Ngāti Te Rehunga
- Ngāti Urakiterangi
- Ngāti Whakaiti
- Ngāti Whatuiāpiti
- Ngāti Whiti
- Ngāti Whitikaupeka

Tamatea is roughly equivalent to Central Hawke's Bay District. There are eighteen hapū:

- Ngāi Tahu o Kahungunu
- Ngāi Te Kikiri o Te Rangi
- Ngāi Te Ōatua
- Ngāi Toroiwaho
- Ngāti Hinetewai
- Ngāti Kekehaunga
- Ngāti Kere
- Ngāti Manuhiri
- Ngāti Mārau o Kahungunu
- Ngāti Parakiore
- Ngāti Pihere
- Ngāti Pukututu
- Ngāti Tamatea
- Ngāti Tamaterā
- Ngāti Whatuiāpiti
- Rangi Te Kahutia
- Rangitotohu
- Tamatea Hinepare o Kahungunu

Tāmaki nui-ā-Rua is roughly equivalent to Tararua District (i.e. the northern half of Wairarapa. It contains seven hapū:

- Ngā Hau E Whā
- Ngāti Hāmua
- Ngāti Ihaka Rautahi
- Ngāti Mutuahi
- Ngāti Pakapaka
- Ngāti Te Rangiwhakaewa
- Te Hika a Pāpāuma

Wairarapa covers the rest of the Wairarapa, down to the Cook Strait. It contains twenty-five hapū:

- Kahukuraawhitia
- Kahukuranui
- Ngāi Rangawhakairi
- Ngāi Tahu
- Ngāi Taneroroa
- Ngāi Tumapūhia a Rangi
- Ngāti Hikawera o Kahungunu
- Ngāti Hinewaka
- Ngāti Kahukuranui o Kahungunu Kauiti
- Ngāti Kaparuparu
- Ngāti Meroiti
- Ngāti Moe
- Ngāti Parera
- Ngāti Rākairangi
- Ngāti Rangitataia
- Ngāti Rangitehewa
- Ngāti Tatuki
- Ngāti Te Ahuahu
- Ngāti Te Hina
- Ngāti Te Tomo o Kahungunu
- Ngāti Tūkoko
- Tahu o Kahungunu
- Tamahau
- Te Hika a Pāpāuma ki Wairarapa
- Whiunga

== Ngāti Kahungunu Iwi Incorporated ==
=== Organisational structure of NKII ===
In 1988, Te Rūnanganui o Ngāti Kahungunu Incorporated was established as a centralised organisation responsible for iwi development, but it went into receivership in 1994. The organisation re-emerged with a new constitution in 1996 under the name Ngāti Kahungunu Iwi Incorporated (NKII). An election was held in 1997, resulting in the establishment of an elected board of trustees and a new mandate to govern iwi development. Elections are held every three years, and all adults with a whakapapa link to a hapū of Ngāti Kahungunu are eligible to vote. The chairperson of the board of trustees usually represents the iwi in political affairs.

In accordance with the constitution of Ngāti Kahungunu Iwi Inc, the board of trustees consists of ten tangata whenua representatives:

- One representative is elected within each of the six geographic and administrative divisions of the Ngāti Kahungunu area: Wairoa, Te Whanganui-ā-Orotū, Heretaunga, Tamatea, Tāmaki-nui-a Rua and Wairarapa. The constitution requires that a candidate for election to any of these positions must already be an elected board member of the Taiwhenua (local governing body) of the respective geographical subdivision.
- Two representatives are elected at large by registered members of Ngāti Kahungunu who reside outside of the Ngāti Kahungunu region. This electorate is referred to in the constitution as the Taurahere Rūnanga. Candidates for election to these positions must have a whakapapa link to a hapū of Ngāti Kahungunu.
- One representative is elected as a kaumātua; a respected elder of the iwi who is proficient in Ngāti Kahungunu tikanga, kawa (traditional legal protocols), and reo. This representative is elected directly to the board by other kaumātua of Ngāti Kahungunu.
- One representative is elected at large by the iwi membership to the chair of the board of trustees. To be eligible for this position, the candidate must already be an elected board member of a Taiwhenua of one of the geographical subdivisions of the iwi. In addition, the candidate must be proficient in Ngāti Kahungunu tikanga, kawa, and reo. As a special provision, if the incumbent chairperson's term as a board member of a Taiwhenua expires during their tenure as chair of the iwi board, it does not disqualify them from seeking re-election.

The board employs a General Manager and staff, which oversees the operational affairs of the iwi organisation. General Managers have included Labour member of parliament Meka Whaitiri. An asset holding company was also established in 2005 to manage the iwi's investment portfolio. The company's directors include former rugby player Taine Randell.

=== Leadership ===
When Te Rūnanganui o Ngāti Kahungunu Incorporated was established in 1988, its first chairperson was Pita Sharples. By 1994 a rapid succession of other chairpeople had led the organisation, while severe disharmony between board members was increasingly hampering the board's effectiveness. As a result, a case was brought to the High Court of New Zealand, where the dysfunctionality of the board was given as evidence of the need for the court to intervene. The court placed Te Rūnanganui o Ngāti Kahungunu Incorporated into receivership, and placed it under the jurisdiction of the Māori Land Court.

After the creation of a new constitution, the period of receivership ended and in 1996 the organisation was renamed Ngāti Kahungunu Iwi Incorporated. The first election for the new board took place in March 1997. Ngahiwi Tomoana of Heretaunga and Toro Waka of Te Whanganui-ā-Orotū were elected chairman and deputy chairman respectively.

=== Ngāti Kahungunu Treaty settlements ===
While NKII is the mandated iwi organisation (MIO) in charge of iwi development and overseeing the fisheries settlement it received in 2004, Ngāti Kahungunu have settled their Treaty settlements of historical grievances on a hapu basis. Because of this, Ngāti Kahungunu has seven separate entities that have (or are in the process of) received their Treaty settlements to govern for their respective affiliate hapu and whanau. This is contrary to a centralised iwi entity that has more power than its hapu/hapu collectives.

Heretaunga Tamatea is a settling group with assets of $130m, mainly in ex-state forests, and plans for substantial developments, through Heretaunga Tamatea Pou Tahua Limited Partnership, its commercial arm. In a 2014 settlement with the government, Heretaunga Tamatea was described as including: Ngāi Tahu ki Takapau, Ngāi Tamaterā, Ngāi Te Ao, Ngāi Te Hauapu, Ngāi Te Hurihanga-i-te-rangi, Ngāi Te Kīkiri o te Rangi, Ngāi Te Oatua, Ngāi Te Rangikoianake I and II, Ngāi Te Rangitekahutia I and II, Ngāi Te Rangitotohu (also known as Rangitotohu), Ngāi Te Ūpokoiri, Ngāi Te Whatuiāpiti, Ngāi Toroiwaho, Ngāti Hāwea, Ngāti Hikatoa, Ngāti Hinemanu, Ngāti Hinemoa, Ngāti Hinetewai, Ngāti Hoata, Ngāti Honomokai, Ngāti Hōri, Ngāti Kautere, Ngāti Kere, Ngāti Kotahi, Ngāti Kurukuru, Ngāti Mārau o Kahungunu (also known as Ngāti Mārau], Ngāti Mahuika, Ngāti Manuhiri, Ngāti Mihiroa, Ngāti Ngarengare, Ngāti Papatuamāro, Ngāti Pīhere, Ngāti Pōporo, Ngāti Pukututu, Ngāti Rahunga, Ngāti Takaora ( Ngāti Takaro), Ngāti Tamatea, Ngāti Te Rehunga, Ngāti Toaharapaki, Ngāti Tukuaterangi (also known as Ngāti Tukua I te Rangi), Ngāti Tukuoterangi, or Ngāti Tuku(a)oterangi), Ngāti Ura ki te Rangi (also known as Ngāti Urakiterangi) and Ngāti Whakaiti.

=== Radio Kahungunu ===
Radio Kahungunu is the official station of Ngāti Kahungunu. It began as Tairawhiti Polytechnic training station Te Toa Takitini 2XY, making two short-term broadcasts on 1431 AM in December 1988, and October and November 1989. It was relaunched in 1990 as Radio Kahungunu 2XT, sharing the 765 AM frequency with Hawke's Bay's Racing Radio and Radio Pacific. It began broadcasting full-time in late 1991, moved dedicated studios at Stortford Lodge in the late 1990s, and began an FM simulcast on 4 September 2000. It broadcasts from Hastings, and is available on 94.3 FM and 765 AM in Hawkes Bay.

== Notable people ==
Name	Birth	Death	Known for
Frank Barclay	5 June 1887	20 November 1959	Professional rugby league footballer who played in the 1900s and 1910s and awarded for acts of gallantry in World War I.
Manu Bennett	10 October 1969		Film and television actor known for roles in Spartacus and The Hobbit.
Wayne Buckingham	29 March 1956		Former New Zealand Men's Hockey right full back (1978–1981) and part of the 1980 New Zealand Men's Hockey Olympic team.
James Carroll	20 August 1857	18 October 1926	Member of Parliament for the Eastern Maori and Waiapu electorates, first Māori to hold the cabinet position of Minister of Native Affairs.
Turi Carroll	24 August 1890	11 November 1975	Tribal leader, politician and soldier.
Hirini Whaanga Christy	16 August 1883	1 July 1955	Religious leader, member of the seventy of the Church of Jesus Christ of Latter-day Saints.
Jemaine Clement	10 January 1974		Actor, musician, comedian, singer, director and writer.
William Turakiuta Cooper	1886	4 August 1949	Tribal leader and husband of Dame Whina Cooper.
Airini Donnelly	1855	7 June 1909	Tribal leader and controversial landowner.
Lowell Goddard	25 November 1948		First Māori Justice of the High Court of New Zealand, former Chair of Independent Police Conduct Authority, appointed head of the Independent Inquiry into Child Sexual Abuse in England and Wales in February 2015.
Aaron Hape	1991		Fellow of the Royal Society of Arts first Māori to be invested as an Associate Fellow of the Royal Commonwealth Society.
Jack Hemi	23 August 1914	1 June 1996	Sportsman who played for the New Zealand Māori rugby league team and the Māori All Blacks.
Richard Tahuora Himona	7 September 1905	7 August 1984	Tribal leader and local politician.
Hine-i-paketia		1870	Tribal leader and prolific seller of Māori land.
Parekura Horomia	9 November 1950	29 April 2013	Member of Parliament for the Ikaroa-Rāwhiti electorate, Minister of Māori Affairs in the Fifth Labour Government from 2000 until 2008.
Hēmi Pītiti Huata	1867	13 October 1954	Tribal and religious leader.
Donna Awatere Huata	1949		Member of Parliament for the ACT Party from 1996 until 2003, high-profile convicted fraudster.
Wiremu Te Tau Huata	23 September 1917	20 December 1991	Tribal and religious leader, musical composer who wrote Tūtira Mai Ngā Iwi.
Tama Huata	15 April 1950	11 February 2015	Performing arts leader.
īhāia Hūtana	1844	9 November 1938	Tribal leader and editor of Huia Tangata Kotahi, a newspaper supportive of the Kotahitanga Māori parliament movement, published from 1893 until 1895.
Ross Ihaka	1954		Academic and co-creator of the R Programming Language.
Moana Jackson	10 October 1945	31 March 2022	Prominent Māori lawyer, activist and academic.
Syd Jackson	1939	3 September 2007	Māori activist, and trade union leader.
Hoani Te Whatahoro Jury	4 February 1841	26 September 1923	Scholar and prolific writer, religious leader in the Church of Jesus Christ of Latter-day Saints.
Te Aitu-o-te-rangi Jury		1854	Tribal leader and prominent landowner.
Paora Kaiwhata		19 May 1892	Tribal leader.
Rangi Ruru Wananga Karaitiana	4 March 1909	15 December 1970	Songwriter, composer of "Blue Smoke" made famous by Pixie Williams.
Rēnata Kawepō		14 April 1888	Prominent Ngāti Kahungunu chief and military leader in the East Cape War and Te Kooti's War.
Leo Koziol	1969		Director of the Wairoa Māori Film festival.
India Logan-Riley			Climate activist.
Golan Haberfield Maaka	4 April 1904	17 May 1978	Leader in Māori health, one of the first Māori General Practitioners.
Hamuera Tamahau Mahupuku	25 Sep 1840	14 January 1904	Tribal leader and major runholder. Founder of the newspaper Te Puke ki Hikurangi.
Maata Mahupuku	10 April 1890	1954	Prolific writer and diarist, friend and confidant of Katherine Mansfield.
Purakau Maika	1851-1852	4 August 1917	Tribal leader and editor of the newspaper Te Puke ki Hikurangi.
Emarina Manuel	21 August 1915	16 August 1996	Tribal leader and community welfare activist.
James Waitaringa Mapu	4 March 1894	8 August 1985	Soldier, international athlete and tribal leader.
Henare Matua	1838	1894	Tribal leader and politician.
Stuart Meha	29 December 1878	7 November 1963	Religious leader in the Church of Jesus Christ of Latter-day Saints, known for the first translation of the Book of Mormon into Māori.
Rina Winifred Moore	6 April 1923	1975	First Māori woman doctor.
Suzanne Pitama			Researcher in health education and Māori health at the University of Otago. First PhD in indigenous medical education in New Zealand.
Renée	19 July 1929	11 December 2023	Feminist writer and playwright best known for the trilogy of plays beginning with Wednesday to Come.
Nireaha Tamaki	1837	1911	Tribal leader known for his role in the 1894 legal case Nireaha Tāmaki v. Baker in which the Court of Appeals denied that it could review land transactions between the Crown and Māori. The ruling was quashed when Tamaki appealed the case to the Privy Council in 1900.
Pāora Te Potangaroa		1881	Māori religious leader from Wairarapa.
Tipi Tainui Ropiha	1895	1978	Secretary of Māori Affairs 1948 to 1957 – the first Māori person to head the Department of Māori Affairs.
Ngahiwi Tomoana			Hawke's Bay iwi chairman.
Pita Sharples	20 July 1941		Academic and politician, Member of Parliament for the Tāmaki Makaurau electorate, Minister of Māori Affairs in the Fifth National Government from 2008 until 2014. Former Chairman of Te Rūnanganui o Ngāti Kahungunu Incorporated.
Matai Smith	2 May 1977		Television personality known for hosting Good Morning between 2007 and 2012, and Homai Te Pakipaki.
Te Matenga Tamati		1914	Tribal religious leader.
Karaitiana Takamoana		24 February 1879	Prominent chief and Member of Parliament for the Eastern Maori electorate.
Rawiri Tareahi	1820		Tribal leader.
Ngātuere Tāwhirimātea Tāwhao		29 November 1890	Prominent tribal leader from Wairarapa.
Ian Taylor	1950		Former television personality and prominent businessman, founder of Taylormade Media.
Raniera Te Ahiko		1894	Prominent tribal leader and oral historian.
Mohi Te Ātahīkoia		1928	Tribal leader, politician and historian.
Henare Te Atua		1912	Tribal leader.
Te Retimana Te Korou		1882	Tribal leader.
Piripi Te Maari-o-te-rangi		1895	Tribal leader and political activist.
Moihi Te Matorohanga		1865	Tribal religious leader from Wairarapa.
Te Mānihera Te Rangi-taka-i-waho		1885	Tribal religious leader from Wairarapa.
Wiremu Te Koti Te Rato	1820	1895	Wesleyan religious leader.
Taiawhio Tikawenga Te Tau	1860	1939	Religious leader and politician from Wairarapa.
Henare Wepiha Te Wainohu	1882	1920	Tribal religious leader.
Iraia Te Ama-o-te-rangi Te Whaiti	1861	1918	Tribal leader and oral historian.
Kaihau Te Rangikakapi Maikara Te Whaiti	1863	1937	Tribal leader.
Tiakitai		1847	Prominent chief of Ngāti Kahungunu, died at sea in September 1847 sailing from Ahuriri to Māhia.
Henare Tomoana	1820	20 February 1904	Prominent chief of Ngāti Kahungunu, military leader in the East Cape War and Te Kooti's War, Member of Parliament for the Eastern Maori electorate and Member of the New Zealand Legislative Council.
Paraire Henare Tomoana		1946	Prominent chief of Ngāti Kahungunu, son of Henare Tomoana, editor of the newspaper Toa Takatini and composer of several well-known Māori songs, including "E Pari Ra", "Hoera Rā Te Waka Nei", "Hoki Hoki", and "Pōkarekare Ana".
Metiria Turei	1970		Member of Parliament and co-leader of the Green Party.
Chrissy Witoko	11 September 1944	5 November 2002	Business owner, established the Evergreen Coffee Lounge which became an important meeting space for Wellington's LGBTQIA+ community

== See also ==
- Maniaiti Marae

== Bibliography ==
- Mitchell, J. H. (2014). Takitimu: A History of Ngati Kahungunu. Libro International. ISBN 978-1-877514-72-2.
- Parsons, Patrick (1997). WAI 400: The Ahuriri Block: Maori Customary Interests (PDF).
