= Hirini Whaanga Christy =

New Zealand Mormon leader

Hirini Whaanga Christy (16 August 1883 – 1 July 1955) was a New Zealand Mormon leader, farmer, interpreter, community leader. Of Māori descent, he identified with the Ngati Kahungunu and Ngati Rakaipaaka iwi. He was born in Nūhaka, New Zealand, on 16 August 1883. He was a great-grandson of Ihaka Whaanga.

Christy emigrated to Utah Territory in 1894 with his extended family. Christy attended high school in Salt Lake City and later graduated from Latter-day Saints' University, where he was a star athlete. Christy was a member of the Mormon Tabernacle Choir and married Kathleen Welsh in 1907.

In 1918, Christy and his family returned to New Zealand and settled in Nūhaka. While there, he became the first Māori to become a seventy in the Church of Jesus Christ of Latter-day Saints.
