= James Waitaringa Mapu =

James Waitaringa Mapu (4 March 1894–8 August 1985) was a New Zealand interpreter, sportsman, farmer and community leader. Of Māori descent, he identified with the Ngati Kahungunu and Ngati Rakaipaaka iwi. He was born in Moteo, Hawke's Bay, New Zealand on 4 March 1894.
