= Wī Huata =

Wī Huata CBE QSO MC
- Born: Wiremu Te Tau Huata; 23 September 1917; Mōhaka, New Zealand
- Died: 20 December 1991 (aged 74); Hastings, New Zealand
- Occupation: Anglican priest
- Relatives: Tama Huata (son); Hēmi Pītiti Huata (father); Tāmihana Huata (grandfather)

Wiremu "Wī" Te Tau Huata CBE QSO MC (23 September 1917 – 20 December 1991) was a New Zealand Anglican priest and military chaplain. Of Māori descent, he identified with the Ngāti Kahungunu iwi. He was born at Mōhaka in northern Hawke's Bay, New Zealand, on 23 September 1917.

Huata was chaplain to the 28th New Zealand (Maori) Battalion, which was part of the Second New Zealand Expeditionary Force (2NZEF) during World War II. He was awarded the Military Cross for his service in Italy. After the war he married Ringahora Hēni Ngākai Ybel Tomoana, the daughter of Paraire Tomoana and Kuini Raerena.

In the 1984 Queen's Birthday Honours, Huata was appointed a Companion of the Queen's Service Order for community service. In the 1991 New Year Honours, he was made a Commander of the Order of the British Empire, for services to the community.

Huata was the third generation of his family who was an Anglican minister in the Diocese of Waiapu. His father was the Rev. Hēmi Pītiti Huata, who was ordained as a priest in 1898 and appointed as the vicar at Frasertown, near Wairoa. His grandfather, Tāmihana Huata, joined the Church Missionary Society (CMS) and on 25 September 1864 he was ordained as a priest and was appointed as the vicar at Frasertown.
