= Ākenehi Tōmoana =

Māori woman leader of chiefly status and women's rights activist in New Zealand

- Born: Ākenehi Patoka c. 1843
- Died: 1908 (aged 64–65)
- Occupations: leader of chiefly status (wāhine rangatira), landowner, suffragist and women's rights activist
- Spouse: Henare Tomoana (m. 1852)
- Children: 13, including Paraire Tomoana

Ākenehi Tōmoana (née Patoka, c. 1843–1908) was a Māori leader of chiefly status (wāhine rangatira), landowner, suffragist and women's rights activist in New Zealand.

== Biography ==
Tōmoana was a prominent New Zealand Māori leader of chiefly status, descended from Ngāti Te Rangiita, Ngāti Turakiwai, Ngāti Kahungunu, Ngāti Te Whatuiāpiti and Ngāti Tūwharetoa.

In 1852, Tōmoana married chief Hēnare Tōmoana of Heretaunga (died 1904). It was the second marriage for them both. They 13 children together including their son Paraire Hēnare Tōmoana, who became a sportsman.

When the Native Land Court (now the Māori Land Court) was established in 1865 under the Native Lands Act, Tōmoana represented her land interests. In 1883 her husband said at a Native Land Court hearing that "through the courage of my wife Äkenehi ... lands have been retained."

In 1893, Tōmoana accompanied Meri Te Tai Mangakāhia to present a motion at the Te Kotahitanga Māori parliament. They were the first women recorded to address the lower house and called for Māori women to be able to vote and stand for parliamentary seats.

By 1895, Tōmoana became part of a group of high-status women called the "First Wives of Heretaunga", who established the Komiti Wahine Māori. At Te Haukē Marae, the group established a forum to discuss women's suffrage, equal rights for women, temperance, and the need to stop selling ancestral land.

Tōmoana became ill in 1899 and retired from her campaigning activities. She died in 1908 and was buried at Pakipaki, but was later moved to be buried at Waipatu with her husband.

== Legacy ==
In 2020, writing by Tōmoana was set to music for a performance at the Hamilton Fringe Festival.
