= Marie Stewart =

Marie Stewart may refer to:

- Marie Stewart, Countess of Mar (1576–1644), Scottish courtier
- Marie Stewart (farmer) (1898–1983), New Zealand poultry farmer, promoter and community leader
- Marie Stewart (1882–1956), stage name Marie Doro, American actress

== See also ==
- Mary Stuart (disambiguation), also Stewart
