= Raniera =

Raniera is a given name. It is a Māori transliteration of the name Daniel. Notable people with the name include:

- Raniera Ellison (1915–1974), New Zealand fishing company manager
- Raniera Te Ahiko (died 1894), New Zealand historian
- Raniera Te Aohou Ratana, New Zealand religious leader
