= Īhaka Whaanga =

Ngati Rakaipaaka leader, assessor, military leader

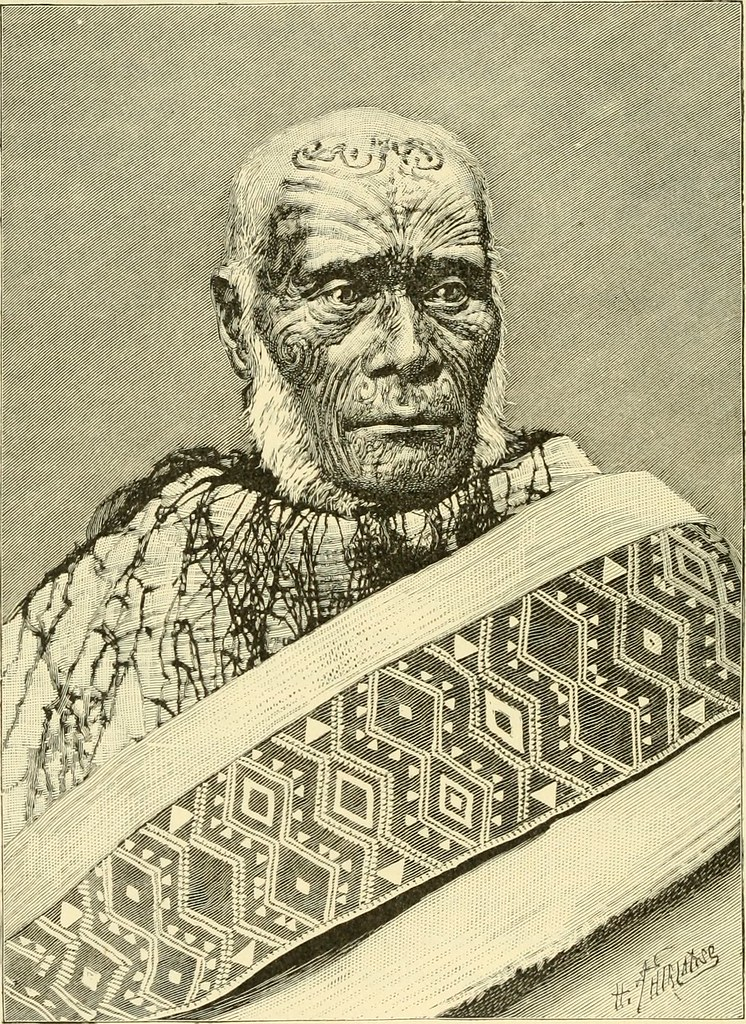
- Posthumous sketch after a photograph, 1890
- Born: c.1790s or 4 July 1808; Hawkes Bay, Aotearoa
- Died: 18 December 1875 (age possibly 67); Māhia, Hawkes Bay, Aotearoa

Īhaka Whaanga (died 14 December 1875) was a notable New Zealand rangatira, assessor and military leader of northern Hawke's Bay. Of Māori descent, he identified with the Ngati Rakaipaaka iwi, connected to Ngāti Kahungunu. Hirini Whaanga Christy was a great-grandson. Whaanga died at Māhia on 14 December 1875.
