= Stuart Meha =

New Zealand LDS Church leader (1878–1963)

Stuart Meha (29 December 1878 – 7 November 1963) was a New Zealand farmer and local Mormon leader. Of Māori descent, he identified with the Ngati Kahungunu, Ngati Rakaipaaka and Rangitane iwi. He was born in Wanstead, Hawke's Bay, New Zealand on 29 December 1878.

Meha was baptised as a member of the Church of Jesus Christ of Latter-day Saints (LDS Church) when he was eight years old; his parents were converts to the church. In 1916, he served as a missionary to other Māori villages. Between 1917 and 1919, he assisted Matthew Cowley in the re-translation of the Book of Mormon into Māori and with the first-time translations of the Doctrine and Covenants and the Pearl of Great Price into Māori. In 1928, Meha became the first counsellor to Eriata Nopera, who was the first Māori to be the president of an LDS Church district. After Nopera's tenure, Meha became the president of the church's Hawke's Bay District.
