= Te Hāpuku =

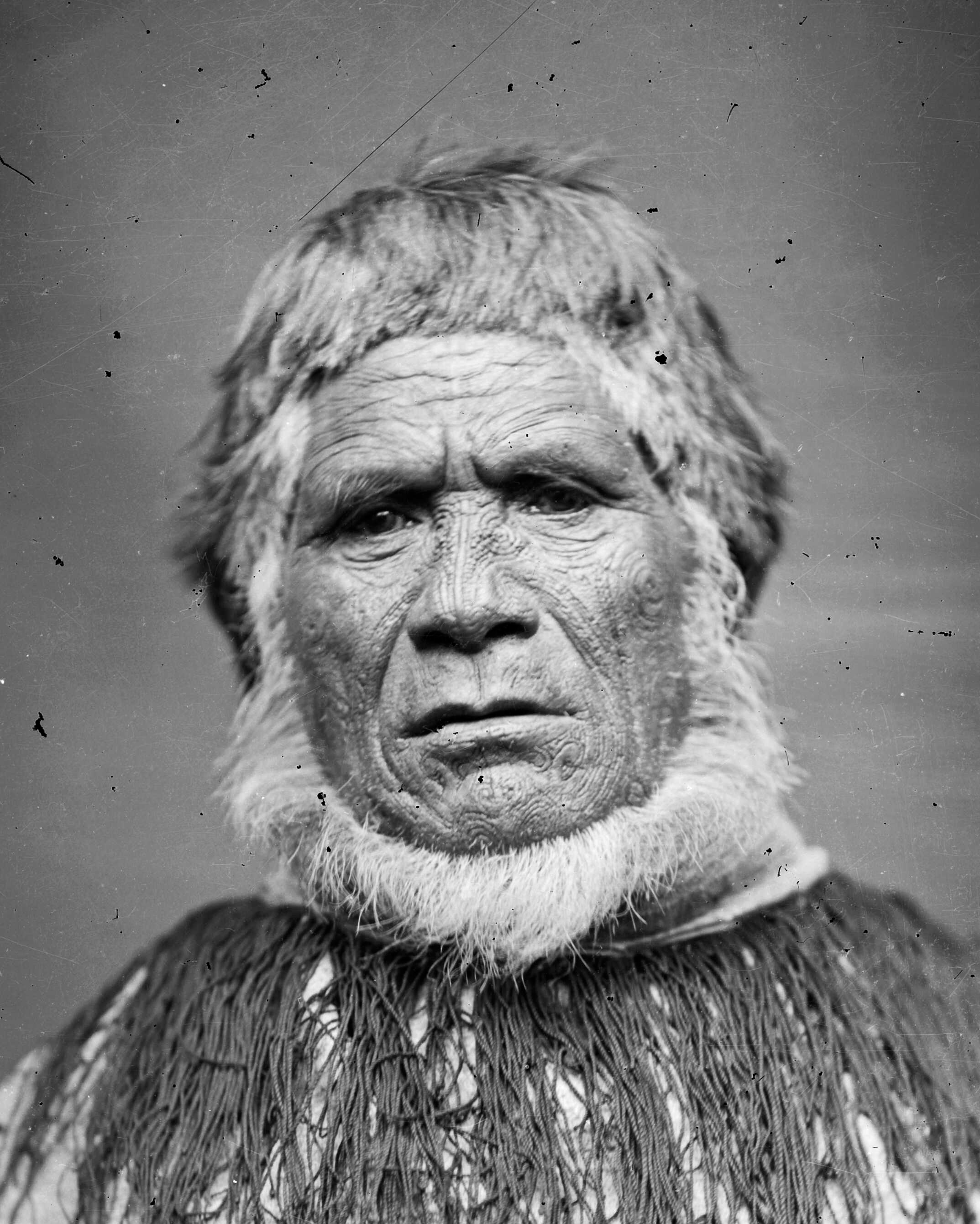
Te Hapuku ca. 1870s

Te Hāpuku (died 1878), sometimes known as Te Ika-nui-o-te-moana, was a Māori leader of the Ngāti Te Whatuiāpiti hapū of the Ngāti Kahungunu iwi in Hawke's Bay, New Zealand, and a farmer and assessor. Born in the late 18th century in a small town called Te Hauke, in the first part of his life he was overshadowed in Ngāti Te Whatuiāpiti by his father's cousin Te Pareihe, until the latter's death in 1844. In 1838 Te Hāpuku visited the Bay of Islands where he signed He Whakaputanga, becoming one of only two non-northern chiefs to do so. Later, when the Treaty of Waitangi was brought to Hawke's Bay, Te Hāpuku initially refused to sign, but was eventually persuaded to do so. From the 1850s he was a keen seller of land, wishing to attract the economic benefit of European settlers. He now rests in the Urupa in Te Hauke with a cenotaph donated by the New Zealand Government.
