= Taiawhio Tikawenga Te Tau =

Taiawhio Tikawenga Te Tau (1860–1939) was a notable New Zealand farmer, horse breeder, religious leader and local politician.

Of Māori descent, he identified with the Ngai Tumapuhiarangi and Ngati Kahungunu iwi. He was born in Turanganui, Wairarapa, New Zealand in 1860.
