= Wiremu Te Koti Te Rato =

Wiremu Te Koti Te Rato (1820–1895) was a New Zealand Wesleyan minister. Of Māori descent, he identified with the Ngāti Kahungunu iwi. He was born in the Wairarapa, New Zealand in about 1820.
