= Tipi Tainui Ropiha =

New Zealand surveyor and senior public servant

Tipi Tainui Ropiha CBE ISO (1895–1978) was a notable New Zealand surveyor and senior public servant. Of Māori descent, he identified with the Ngāti Kahungunu and Rangitāne iwi. He was born in Waipawa, New Zealand, in 1895. His daughter, Rina Winifred Moore, was the first Maori woman to graduate as a doctor.

Ropiha was the first Māori person to become Secretary of Māori Affairs (the administrative head of the Department of Māori Affairs), a role he held from 1948 to 1957.

In the 1952 Queen's Birthday Honours, Ropiha was appointed a Companion of the Imperial Service Order. In 1953, he was awarded the Queen Elizabeth II Coronation Medal. Ropiha was made a Commander of the Order of the British Empire, for very valuable services to the Māori race, in the 1972 Queen's Birthday Honours.
