= Tiakitai =

Tiakitai (died 1 September 1847) was a Māori leader of the Ngāti Kahungunu iwi and a trader in Hawke's Bay, New Zealand. He resided mostly in the Waimārama area. He died at sea with 21 others on the night of 1 September 1847 when their boat was lost in a heavy sea.
