= 1972 Birthday Honours (New Zealand) =

Awards list for New Zealand

The 1972 Queen's Birthday Honours in New Zealand, celebrating the official birthday of Elizabeth II, were appointments made by the Queen on the advice of the New Zealand government to various orders and honours to reward and highlight good works by New Zealanders. They were announced on 3 June 1972.

The recipients of honours are displayed here as they were styled before their new honour.

== Knight Bachelor ==
- The Honourable Clifford Parris Richmond – of Wellington; judge of the Court of Appeal. For outstanding services to the law.
- Reginald Charles Frank Savory CBE – of Auckland. For outstanding services to local government and education.

== Order of the Bath ==
=== Companion (CB) ===
Military division

- Lieutenant-General Richard James Holden Webb CBE – Chief of Defence Staff.

== Order of Saint Michael and Saint George ==
=== Companion (CMG) ===
- Lawrence David Hickford OBE – of Taranaki. For very valuable services to local government and the dairy industry.
- Shapton Donald Sinclair – of Waimea West. For very valuable services as chairman of the New Zealand Apple and Pear Marketing Board.

== Order of the British Empire ==
=== Knight Commander (KBE) ===
Civil division

- Malcolm McRae Burns CBE – principal, Lincoln College, Christchurch. For outstanding services to the community.
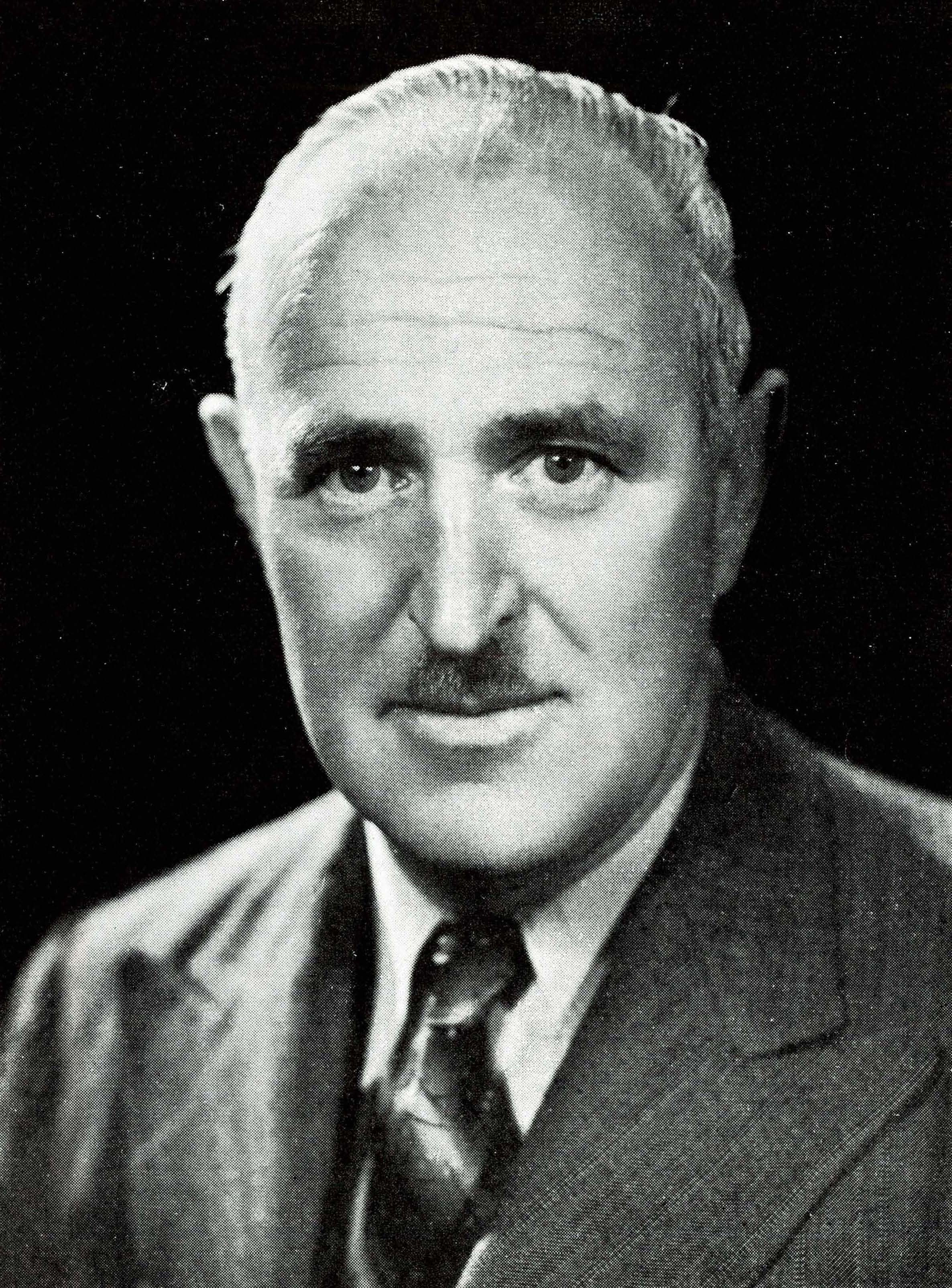
Sir Malcolm Burns

=== Commander (CBE) ===
Civil division

- Harry Heaton Barker OBE – mayor of Gisborne. For very valuable services to local government.
- John Denis McGrath – of Wellington. For very valuable services to the community.
- Eric Bruce Mackenzie – of Wellington. For very valuable services as general manager of the New Zealand Electricity Department.
- Tipi Tainui Ropiha ISO – of Auckland. For very valuable services to the Māori race.
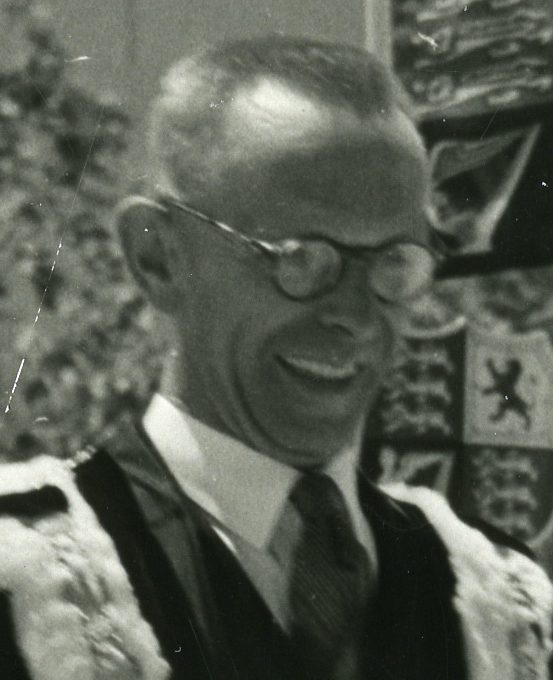
Harry Barker

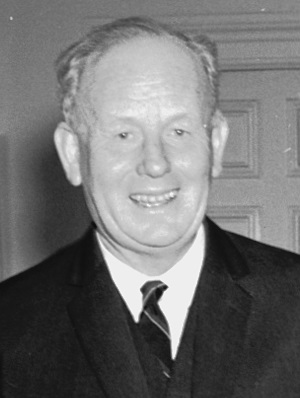
Denis McGrath

=== Officer (OBE) ===
Civil division

- Whitford James Brown. For valuable services as mayor of Porirua.
- Phyllis Elaine Brusey – of Days Bay. For valuable services to the arts.
- John Cowie – of Lower Hutt. For valuable services to cricket.
- Samuel Jamieson – of Wellington. For valuable services as director of the Animal Health Division, Ministry of Agriculture.
- John Lambert Kerr – of Christchurch. For valuable services to cricket.
- Ralph McGlashen – of Auckland. For valuable services to education.
- Amos Robinson McKegg. For valuable services as chairman of the Palmerston North Hospital Board.
- Juro Tomin Mazuran – of Auckland. For valuable services to the wine making industry.
- Arthur John Nicoll – of Ashburton. For valuable services to trotting.
- John Philp QFSM – of Invercargill. For valuable services as chairman of the Southland Harbour Board.
- Alfred Geoffrey Scott MBE – of Wellington; manager of the National Film Unit.
- John Malfroy Staveley MC – of Auckland. For valuable services to medicine.
- Samuel James Thompson – of Levin. For valuable services to the community.

Military division

- Captain Samuel Fenwick Mercer – Royal New Zealand Navy.
- Colonel Russell Williden Kerr Ainge – Colonels' List, Royal New Zealand Military Forces (Regular Force).
- Group Captain William Robert Duncan MBE – Royal New Zealand Air Force.
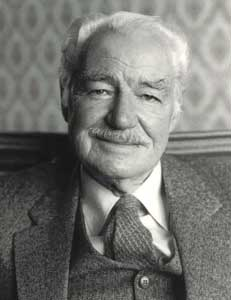
Whitford Brown

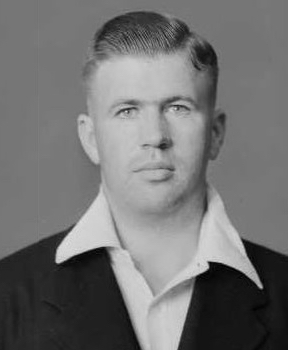
Jack Cowie

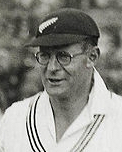
Jack Kerr

=== Member (MBE) ===
Civil division

- Alan Searle Alsweiler – of Invercargill. For services to the community.
- William Albert Edward Archer – of Auckland. For services to the community.
- George Noble Boulton – of Wanganui. For services to the community.
- Oswald Astley Cheesman – of Auckland. For services to music.
- Fletcher Roy Christian – of Auckland. For services to rugby league football.
- Edward Walton Christiansen – of Auckland. For services to the blind.
- William Augustus Christiansen – of Whangārei. For services to local government.
- Jean Clark – of Wellington. For services to the community.
- Geraldine Dora Davison – of Geraldine. For services to the community.
- Alfred Gordon Freeman – of Te Awamutu. For services to local government.
- James Hassall – of Tokoroa. For services to the community.
- The Reverend Canon Beaumont Harold Pierard – of Hamilton. For services to the community.
- David Stanley Radcliffe MM – of Edgecumbe. For services to the community.
- Hugh Douglas Ramsay – of Dunedin. For services to the community.
- Donald Russell Robertson – of Havelock North. For services to the community.
- Muriel Bessie Fullerton-Smith – of Marton. For services to equestrian sport.
- Bertrand Charles Maurice Spiers – of Murchison. For services to education.
- Marion Watson Stewart – of Tauranga. For services to the community.
- Norman Stephen Tankersley – of Masterton. For services to local government.

Military division

- Warrant Control Electrical Mechanician Bruce Arthur Allen – Royal New Zealand Navy.
- Lieutenant Commander (Sp) Alexander George Innes – Royal New Zealand Naval Volunteer Reserve.
- Major Bruce Graham Jenkin – Corps of Royal New Zealand Engineers (Regular Force).
- Captain (Temporary Major) Brian Howard Martin ED – Royal New Zealand Armoured Corps (Territorial Force).
- Lieutenant and Quartermaster Donald Frank Williams – Royal New Zealand Infantry Regiment (Regular Force).
- Flight Lieutenant Sean Christopher Robinson – Royal New Zealand Air Force.
- Squadron Leader Peter Sydney Rule – Royal New Zealand Air Force.

== Companion of the Imperial Service Order (ISO) ==
- James William Dempsey – assistant general manager, New Zealand Railways.

== British Empire Medal (BEM) ==
Civil division

- Wilfred John Bradley – of Timaru. For services to the community.
- Catherine Mary Carey (Sister Mary Aloysia) – of North Auckland. For services to education.
- Ngaire Verna Bakers – of Waimauku. For services to the community.
- Lily Alice Gall – of Gore. For services to nursing.
- Maude Evelyn Hampton – of Tuatapere. For services to the community.
- Hugh Hunter – of Katikati. For services to the community.
- Edith Lucy Oldbury – of Kawhia. For services to the community.
- Olive Rose Violet Newman Parkes – of Palmerston North. For services to the community.
- Paul Edouard Quenneville – of New Caledonia. For services as caretaker of the war cemetery at Bourail.
- William Gordon Ainsley Ramsay – of Christchurch. For services as a personnel officer with the New Zealand Railways.
- Patricia Ellen Isabel Rees – of Blenheim. For services to the community.
- Ivy Mabel Thorp – of Motueka. For services to the community.

Military division

- Temporary Warrant Control Electrical Artificer Antony Charteris Black – Royal New Zealand Navy.
- Chief Petty Officer Electrician Stanley Haines – Royal New Zealand Navy.
- Leading Medical Assistant Robert Peterson – Royal New Zealand Navy.
- Sergeant David Paul Beattie – Royal New Zealand Infantry Regiment (Regular Force).
- Sergeant Joseph Johnston – Royal New Zealand Infantry Regiment.
- Flight Sergeant Kenneth Sealy Cooper – Royal New Zealand Air Force.
- Flight Sergeant William Nevis Halse – Royal New Zealand Air Force.

== Royal Red Cross ==
=== Associate (ARRC) ===
- Matron Helen Mackenzie – Royal New Zealand Nursing Corps (Territorial Force).

== Air Force Cross (AFC) ==
- Wing Commander Mervyn William Hodge – Royal New Zealand Air Force.

== Queen's Commendation for Valuable Service in the Air ==
- Flight Lieutenant Harvey Hammersley – Royal New Zealand Air Force.
