= Pāora Kaiwhata =

New Zealand tribal leader

Paora Kaiwhata (died 19 May 1892) was a New Zealand tribal leader. Of Māori descent, he identified with the Ngāti Kahungunu iwi. He was born in Rakato Pa, on the shore of Oingo Lake, Hawke's Bay, New Zealand. His father was Rawiri Tareahi and his mother was Whareunga. He was said to be 80 years old when he died on 19 May 1892.
