= Rēnata Kawepō =

New Zealand Māori leader and missionary

Rēnata Kawepō Tama-ki-Hikurangi
- Paramount Chief of Ngāi Te Ūpokoiri, Ngāti Hinemanu me ōna piringa Hapū
- Reign: 1845
- Predecessor: Te Wanikau
- Born: Tama-ki-Hikurangi; 1810- Taumata o hē
- Died: 14 April 1888; Ōmāhu
- Burial: St John's Church, Ōmāhu
- Spouse: Maora
- Issue: Peni Te Uamairangi
- House: Te Uamairangi
- Dynasty: Te Ūpokoiri
- Mother: Pakapaka
- Religion: Church of England
- Occupation: Paramount Chief & Missionary

Rēnata Kawepō Tama-ki-Hikurangi

Te Amorangi ki Ōmāhu - Saint of Ōmāhu
- Born: Taumata o hē
- Residence: Ōmāhu
- Died: 1888-04-14
- Honored in: Ngāti Kahungunu
- Major shrine: St Johns Church, Ōmāhu
- Feast: 2014-04-14
- Attributes: Tribal Flourishing
- Patronage: Ngāti Kahungunu
- Influences: Te Hāhi Mihinare
- Major works: Reconciliation and Unity

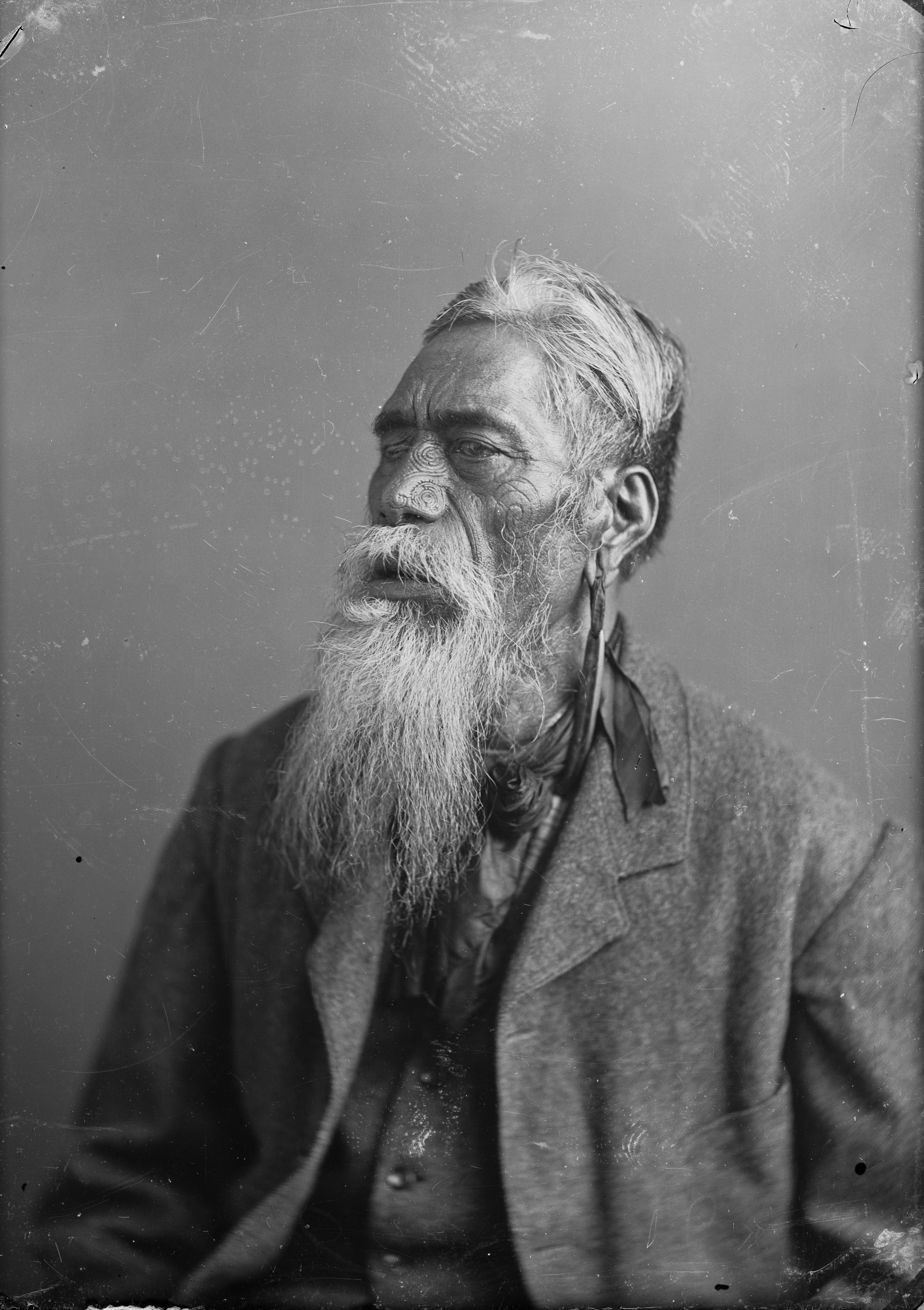
Kawepō in the 1880s

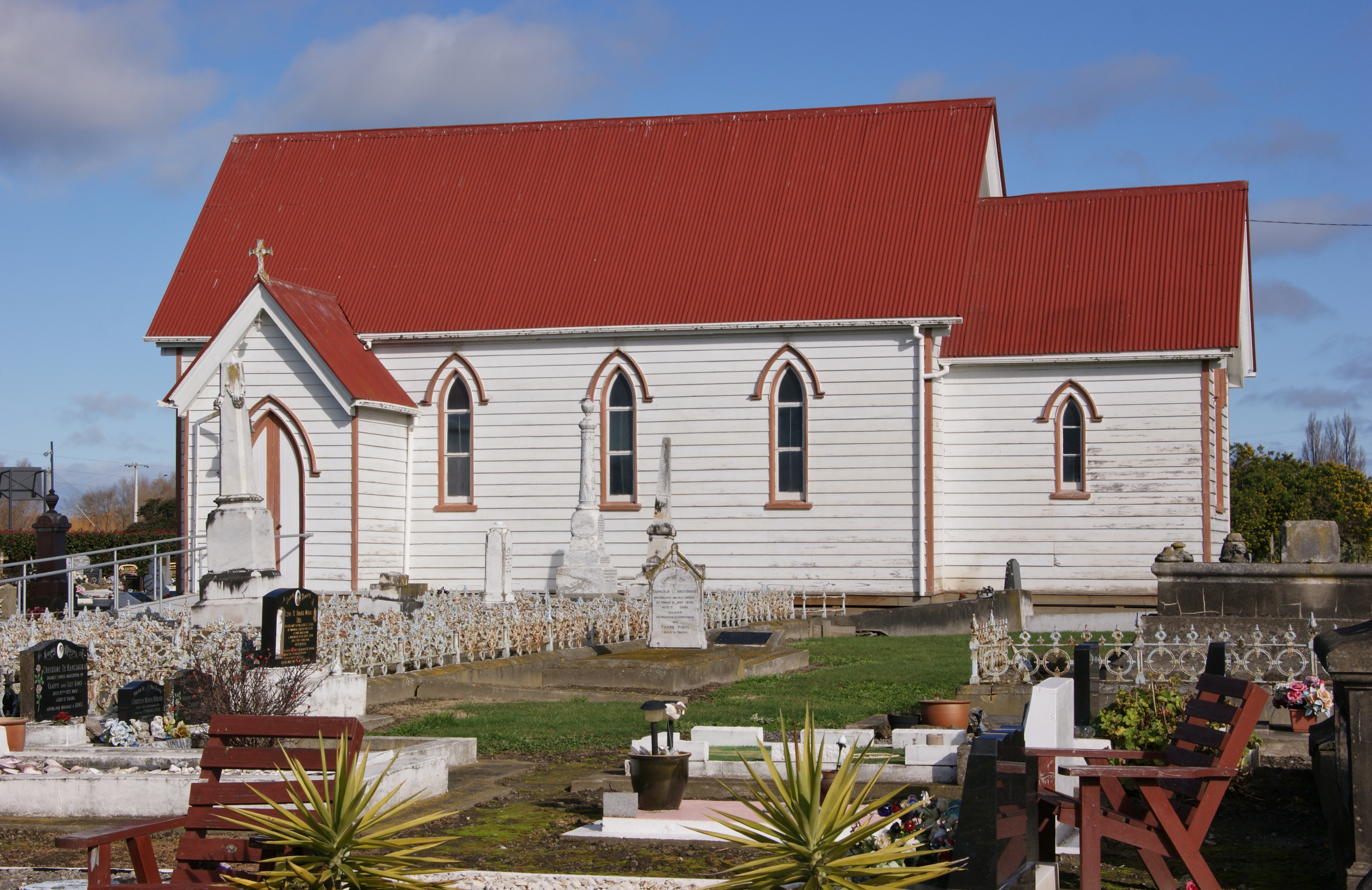
Church of St John at Omahu, Hawke's Bay

Rēnata Kawepō Tama-ki-Hikurangi (? – 14 April 1888) was a New Zealand Māori leader and missionary. Of Māori descent, he identified with the Ngāi Te Ūpokoiri and Ngāti Kahungunu iwi. He was born in Taumata-o-he Pa, 20 kilometres (12 mi) west of what would become Hastings, in Hawke's Bay, New Zealand.

As a young man in 1827, he was among the Ngāi Te Ūpokoiri forces besieged at the island fortress on Lake Rotoatara (near Te Aute) by a force of Ngāti Te Whatuiāpiti and Ngāpuhi led by Te Pareihe. After a two-month siege, it became clear that the fortress was going to fall, and he proposed that some of the defenders hand themselves over as hostages to secure safe passage for the rest. When no one else volunteered, he went by himself, saying kia kawe au ki te pō ("let me deliver myself up to the night!"), from which he took the name Kawepō.

As a prisoner, he was taken first to Manawatu and later to Auckland. William Colenso later brought him back to Hawke's Bay.

He established St John's Church at Omahu. A memorial for him and those who fought alongside him in battle was placed in the cemetery of St John's Church by the government; approved in 1928 and completed in 1929.

== Bibliography ==
- Grace, John Te Herekiekie (1959). Tuwharetoa: The history of the Maori people of the Taupo District. Auckland [N.Z.]: A.H. & A.W. Reed. ASIN B0007JE64K.
