= Paraire Tomoana =

Paraire Henare Tomoana
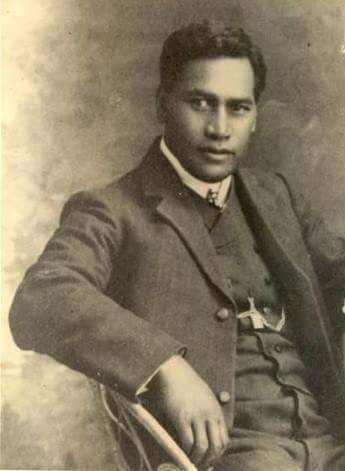
- Born: 1874/75; Heretaunga Plains
- Died: 15 April 1946
- Occupations: Lyricist, writer, tribal leader
- Works: Pokarekare Ana, E Pari Ra
- Parent(s): Henare Tomoana and Ākenehi Tōmoana

Paraire "Friday" Henare Tomoana (died 15 April 1946) was a Māori political leader, journalist, historian, sportsman, and lyricist of the Ngāti Kahungunu and Ngāi Te Whatu-i-Āpiti tribes. Born either in Waipatu or Pakowhai near Hastings, he was the son of Henare Tomoana, the principal chief of the Heretaunga region and Member of Parliament for the Eastern Māori electorate. He was educated at Te Aute College and was a member of the Young Māori Party, an association of alumni from the college that dominated the Māori political landscape in the early 20th century.

Tomoana was in favour of Māori enlistment in the First World War, and was a major fundraiser and organiser of recruitment drives for the New Zealand (Māori) Pioneer Battalion. Between 1921 and 1932 he was an editor of the Māori newspaper Te Toa Takitini, an Anglican periodical providing Māori commentary on current events and Māori history. Tomoana's musical compositions include E Pari Rā and I Runga O Nga Puke. He was an Anglican lay reader, and at the time of his death was widely acknowledged as an authority on Māori history and culture.

Tomoana suffered a stroke and died on 15 April 1946. He was succeeded as the principal Ngāti Kahungunu chief of the Heretaunga region by his eldest son, Taanga Tomoana.

== Personal life ==
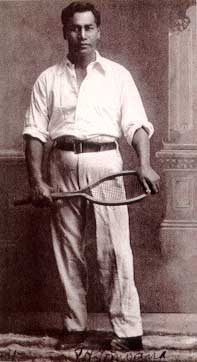
Portrait of Tomoana c. 1905

In his youth, Tomoana received both a Māori and a European education. He attended Te Aute College and, at his father's insistence, received military training in Pōrangahau from an uncle, Ihaia Hutana. During his time at Te Aute, Tomoana became a close friend and confidante of Āpirana Ngata; they remained close all their lives. Despite having a club foot, Tomoana became a skilled sportsman, and represented Hawke's Bay and Gisborne in tennis, rugby, cricket, and golf. As a coach, he went on several international tours with sports teams from Te Aute College. Tomoana's first wife was Pani Potangaroa, whom he divorced in 1912 as they had failed to produce any children. The following year he began a courtship with Kuini Ripeka Raerena, who later became his second wife. The courtship was the subject of Tomoana's lyrical composition Pokarekare Ana. They had eight children and one adopted son.

== Lyrical compositions ==
=== Pokarekare Ana ===
On 27 March 1913, Paraire Tomoana married Kuini Ripeka Raerena. According to the history recounted by their descendants, Tomoana wrote the lyrics to Pokarekare Ana as a letter to Kuini, and adopted the tune from an unknown origin. At Te Poho-o-Rawiri Marae, near Gisborne, he sang the song to Kuini and proposed marriage. The lyrics were first published in 1921, with the tune scored in waltz time. Most contemporary arrangements of the song use a 4/4 time signature, but performances by Tomoana's descendants still use the original arrangement. The origin of the tune is subject to debate; in the song's first publication in 1921, Tomoana wrote that "it emanated from the North of Auckland", and was later popularised by Māori soldiers who were training near Auckland before embarking for the war in Europe. The question of the tune's origin has never been settled. Some descendants of Āpirana Ngata have claimed that he was the true composer of the song's lyrics, but this was not supported by any claim made by Ngata himself.

=== First World War ===
As part of his involvement in the Young Māori Party, Tomoana was committed to fundraising and recruiting Māori for the First and Second World Wars. He became a prolific composer of Māori action songs, many of which remain popular today. In 1915 he composed I Runga O Ngā Puke, which was first performed in Wellington as the Second Maori Contingent departed New Zealand for the Gallipoli Campaign. In 1917 he collaborated with Āpirana Ngata to compose Te Ope Tuatahi, the recruitment song for the New Zealand (Māori) Pioneer Battalion.

=== E Pari Rā ===
In 1918 Tomoana wrote the lyrics for E Pari Rā, a lament to a Māori soldier killed in the war. The origin of the tune that he adopted for E Pari Rā has been attributed to a German waltz called the Blue Eye's Waltz. Two stories are attributed to the origin of the lyrics; according to some sources they were composed by Tomoana for Maku-i-te-Rangi Ellison, whose son Whakatomo Ellison had been killed in the war. According to Tomoana's eldest son Taanga Tomoana, the song was written at the request of Ngahiwi Petiha, a cousin of Tomoana's wife, who was convalescing from wounds in a hospital in England. The song became popular after the war, and was adopted by the Royal New Zealand Navy as its official slow march. It is still played by military bands of the New Zealand Defence Force, in particular by the band of the 7th Wellington and Hawke's Bay Battalion of the New Zealand Army. Composed as an action song, Tomoana originally wrote the score in a 6/8 time signature, however in contemporary performances it is often performed as a slow lullaby in 3/4. Contemporary Māori performances often include a slow verse in 3/4 followed by a verse in double time, in which actions and poi may be used.

== List of compositions ==
- Pokarekare Ana (1913)
- I Runga o Ngā Puke (1915)
- Te Ope Tuatahi (1917—co-written with Āpirana Ngata)
- Hoea Rā Te Waka Nei (1917)
- Tahi Nei Taru Kino
- Hoki Hoki Tonu Mai (1918)
- Pinepine Te Kura (credited with publishing the lyrics for the first time)
