= Richard Tahuora Himona =

New Zealand farmer and community leader

Richard Tahuora Himona (7 September 1905 – 7 August 1984) was a New Zealand farmer and community leader. Of Māori descent, he identified with the Ngāti Kahungunu iwi. He was born in Te Ore Ore, Wairarapa, New Zealand on 7 September 1905.
