= Nireaha Tamaki =

New Zealand Māori leader

Nireaha Tamaki (born c. 1835–37; died 1911) was a New Zealand Māori leader from the Rangitāne and Ngāti Kahungunu iwi (tribes).
