= Kaihau Te Rangikakapi Maikara Te Whaiti =

Ngati Kahungunu woman of mana

Kaihau Te Rangikakapi Maikara Te Whaiti (1863–1937) was a notable New Zealand tribal leader. Of Māori descent, she identified with the Ngāti Kahungunu iwi. She was born in the Wairarapa, New Zealand in 1863.
