= Māori Land Boards =

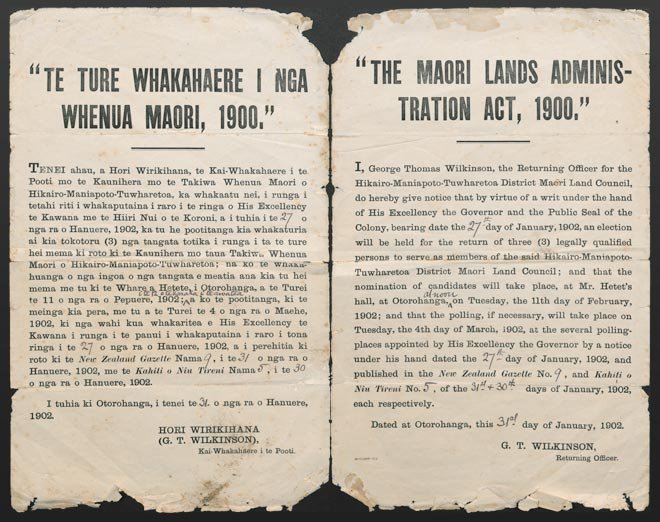
Flyer Māori Land Boards 1902 in Māori and English language

Māori Land Boards (also called Maori Land Councils initially) were administrative bodies in New Zealand. The system was a major instrument of land alienation, whereby Māori lost customary title to their land during the first half of the 20th century.

== History ==
Māori Land Boards when first established were partly made up of elected Māori members. The Maori Land Boards had initially been proposed by Richard Seddon in 1888. Māori landowners vested their land in the boards, which would then lease that land out on their behalf. This converted customary ownership to freehold, though partition orders remained the responsibility of the Māori Land Court.

They were created by the Maori Land Administration Act 1900. This act was introduced just two days after the Maori Councils Act 1900 which was about Māori health. The legislation faced reservation by Wi Pere, Tūkino Te Heuheu, Henare Tomoana and Mohi Te Atahikoia of the Tu Kotahitatanga movement but was passed anyway. The legislation was drafted by Apirana Ngata and expedited by James Carrol (Native Lands Minister). Ngata did not think the inherent principle was workable but thought it was good that Māori had turned from 'protest to the worthwhile goals of land management.' Carrol quickly established the Maori Land Boards, with six started by 1901. By 1904 the Maori Land Councils were at a standstill as Māori realised it did not deliver the autonomy they thought it would and there were protests in 1905.

The Maori Lands Settlement Act 1905 changed the idea that Māori had any self-governance over their land and the Maori Land Boards established under this act gave the native minister authority to take land off Māori deemed 'not required or not suitable for occupation by Māori.'

The Maori Land Boards of 1905 had a reduced membership of three and only one had to be Māori. From 1913 the boards no longer had Māori membership with just two members, the judge and registrar of the Land Court. The boards were granted permission to lend money for development in 1926. The land boards were abolished in 1952.
