= Te Retimana Te Korou =

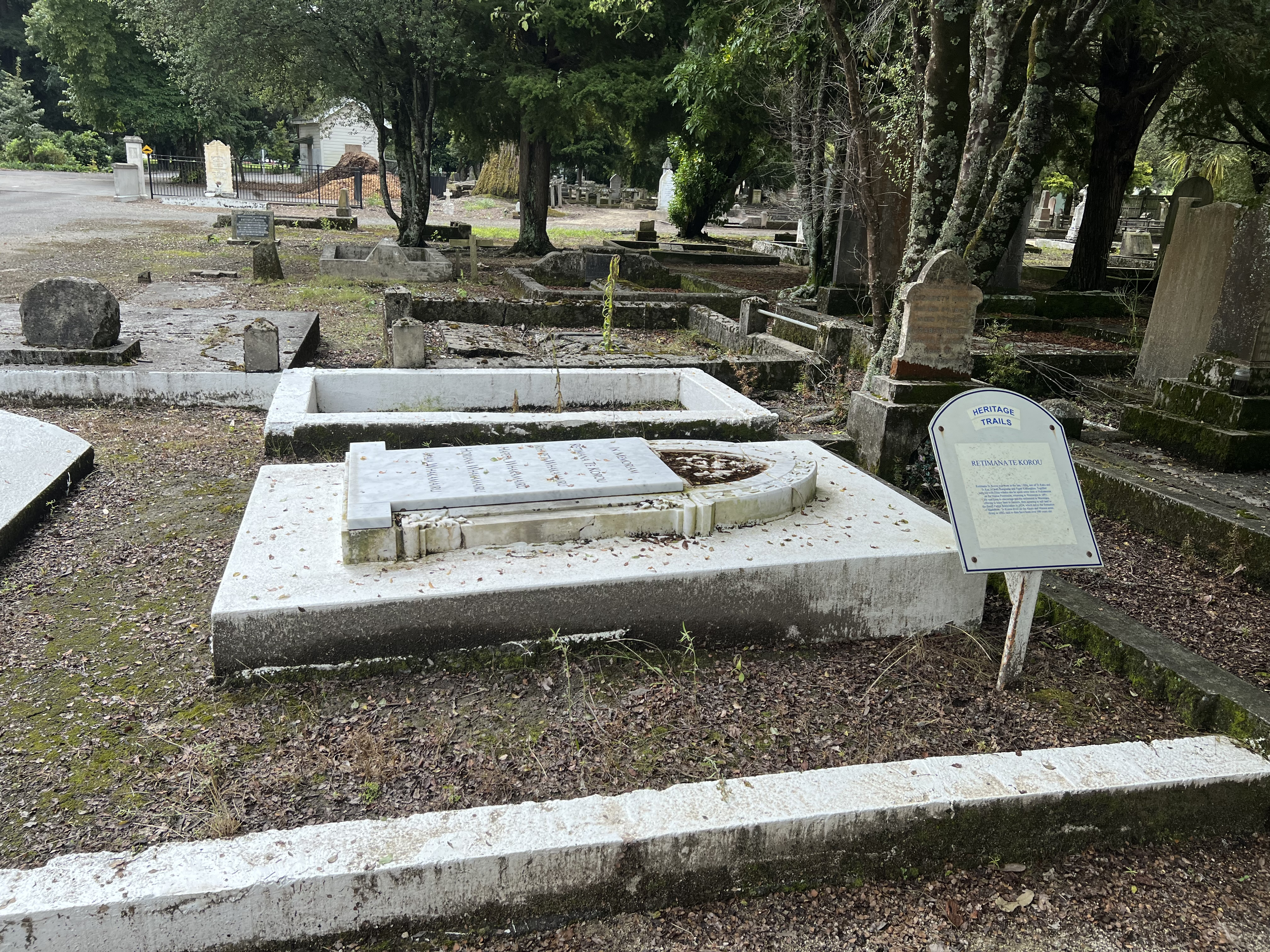

Te Retimana Te Korou (died 1882) was a notable New Zealand tribal leader. Of Māori descent, he identified with the Ngāti Kahungunu and Rangitāne iwi.

== See also ==
- Historical Maori And Pacific Islands, by Victoria University of Wellington Library
