= Rina Moore =

New Zealand doctor (1923–1975)

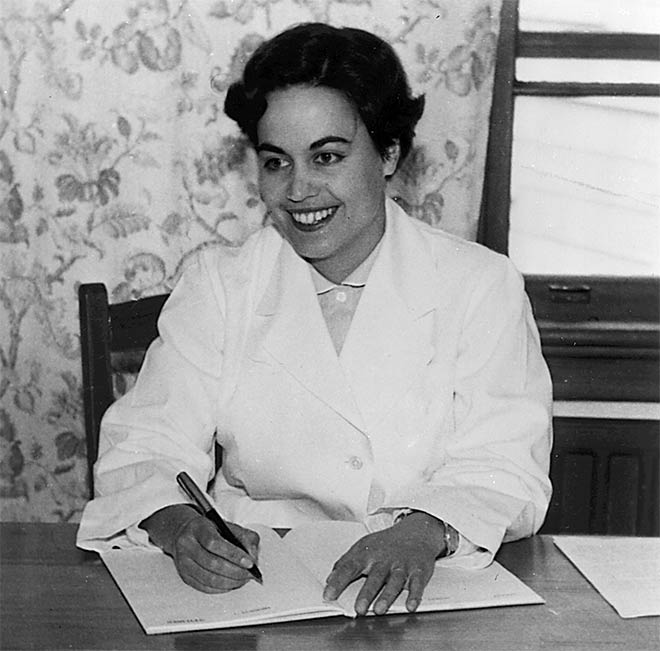
- Born: Rina Winifred Ropiha; 6 April 1923; Auckland, New Zealand
- Died: November 28, 1975 (aged 52); Nelson, New Zealand
- Education: Bachelor of Medicine
- Alma mater: University of Otago
- Occupation: Medical doctor
- Spouse: Ian Moore (m. 1944)

Rina Winifred Moore (née Ropiha, 6 April 1923 – 28 November 1975) was a New Zealand medical doctor. She was reputedly the first wahine Māori to graduate with MB, ChB in 1949

== Early life ==
Rina Winifred Ropiha was born in Auckland, New Zealand, on 6 April 1923. Her mother was Rhoda Walker (Te Whānau-ā-Apanui) and her father Tipi Tainui Ropiha (Ngāti Kahungunu, Rangitāne). Her father was the first Māori to be Secretary of Maori Affairs. Rina grew up in a structured and disciplined household. She had an English nanny until the age of 8, and studied ballet, piano, ballroom dancing and elocution. She entered medical school at the University of Otago in 1943, married Ian Moore in 1944, and gave birth to their first child in 1945. She was able to continue her studies with family support and graduated in 1948.

== Career ==
In 1948, Moore began working as an assistant medical officer in Nelson at Ngāwhatu, a psychiatric hospital, where she later spent some years as Medical Officer. She took a particular interest in mental health, attempting to break down prejudice about mental illness and strengthen links between hospital care and the community. She strongly advocated for sex and relationship education in schools, and Rina was one of the first doctors in New Zealand to prescribe the contraceptive pill in the early 1960s. In the 1960s, she set up a Family Advisory Clinic, a private psychiatric and counselling clinic, in her own home.

She also spoke widely on Māori health and mental health, presenting a paper to the South Island Conference of Young Māori Leaders held in Christchurch, 19–21 August 1960. In 1972, she wrote four papers for the International Congress on Social Psychiatry in Israel, covering urban migration, problems facing Māori and minority races, health and mental health.

In 1966, Rina was diagnosed with breast cancer that had spread to the surrounding lymph nodes. Despite being the standard treatment, Rina refused to have a mastectomy, but had the tumour removed and radiotherapy. Following the cancer diagnosis, Rina had periods of depression. In 1974, Rina suffered a stroke, and further cancer was confirmed in her brain. Rina died in Nelson on the 28th November 1975 aged 52.

== Recognition ==
In 2017, Moore selected as one of the Royal Society Te Apārangi's "150 women in 150 words", celebrating the contributions of women to knowledge in New Zealand.
