= Rawiri Tareahi =

New Zealand Māori leader

Rāwiri Tareahi (fl. 1820–1850) was the principal leader of the Ngāti Hinepare subtribe of the Ngāti Kahungunu iwi (Māori tribe), in Hawke's Bay, New Zealand.

He was born Tareahi in the late 18th century, probably at the Ngāti Hinepare settlement of Te Poraiti, on the western shore of Ahuriri Lagoon, near what became the European settlement of Napier. His mother was Te Huripatu, of Ngāti Hinepare, and his father was Waitaringa, of Ngāi Tākaha, a hapū that lived on the upper Ngaruroro River.

In the early 18th century Tareahi led Ngāti Hinepare warriors to victory in the battle of Taitimuroa, thus becoming recognised as the principal leader of Ngāti Hinepare.

In the early 1820s, during the Musket Wars, northern tribes threatened the Ngāti Kahungunu of Heretaunga (Hawke's Bay) and many of them moved to refuge at Nukutaurua, on Māhia Peninsula. Tareahi and others, however, stayed to defend their home area. The musket-bearing tribes of Waikato, Ngāti Tūwharetoa, Ngāti Maniapoto and Ngāti Raukawa attacked and massacred the tribes of Ahuriri. Tareahi and others were captured alive and taken to the Waikato. He was released and returned home 18 months later. With many Ngāti Kahungunu still at Māhia, Heretaunga was deserted, but he remained, settling near Ōingo Lake.

Tareahi had several children – a son Porokoru Mapu, daughters Hepora, Ani Kanara Marewa and Rawinia Kaingaroa, and son Pāora Kaiwhata. He was baptised by the missionary William Colenso in the late 1840s, taking the Christian name Rāwiri (David). Rāwiri Tareahi died at Te Poraiti, possibly in the 1850s.
