= Ede Oldbury =

Edith Lucy Oldbury BEM (née Morfett; 26 May 1888 – 13 September 1977), was a New Zealand domestic servant, storekeeper and community leader. She was born in Kamo, New Zealand, in 1888.

In the 1972 Queen's Birthday Honours, Oldbury was awarded the British Empire Medal, for services to the community.
