= Raniera Te Ahiko =

Raniera Te Ahiko (?–1894) was a notable New Zealand historian. Of Māori descent, he identified with the Ngai Te Upokoiri and Ngāti Kahungunu iwi. He was born in Taumata-o-he Pa, Hawke's Bay, New Zealand.
