= Īhāia Hūtana =

New Zealand Māori tribal leader

Īhāia Hūtana (c. 1844 – 9 November 1938) was a New Zealand tribal leader, newspaper editor and assessor. Of Māori descent, he identified with the Ngāti Kahungunu iwi. He was born in Poroutawhao, Manawatu/Horowhenua, New Zealand, in about 1844.
