= Hēmi Pītiti Huata =

Ngati Kahungunu leader, Anglican clergyman (1860s–1954)

Hēmi Pītiti Huata (born 1866 or 1867 – 13 October 1954) was a New Zealand Māori tribal leader and Anglican clergyman of the Ngāti Kahungunu iwi. He was born at Rāmoto, Frasertown, New Zealand, in 1866 or 1867. He spent most of his life in the Wairoa district. He had eleven children, one of whom was Wī Huata, who was an Anglican clergyman also.
