= Henare Matua =

Ngati Kahungunu leader, reformer, politician (c.1838–1894)

Henare Matua (c. 1838–1894) was a New Zealand tribal leader, reformer and politician. Of Māori descent, he identified with the Ngati Kahungunu iwi. He was born in Nukutaurua, Hawke's Bay, New Zealand.

He stood in the 1879 by-election for Eastern Maori, coming second (not third). He was seen by some as the "Government candidate" and a leader of the "Repudiation" faction.
