= Young Māori Party =

New Zealand political party

The Young Māori Party was a New Zealand organisation dedicated to improving the position of Māori. It grew out of the Te Aute Students Association, established by former students of Te Aute College in 1897. It was established as the Young Māori Party in 1909.

While the Young Māori Party had political intentions, it did not function as a political party as they are generally understood. The Young Māori Party's members either acted as independents or joined an existing party, such as the New Zealand Liberal Party. In most respects, the Young Māori Party is best understood as a club or association, not a united electoral bloc. Anthropologist and author Toon Van Meijl said of the group "the Young Maori Party's programme generated a basic division within Maori society between a relatively small educated elite and a predominantly illiterate mass of poor people".

== Membership ==
The membership of the Young Māori Party consisted primarily of younger Māori who had received a European-style education. Many were from the East Coast or the Bay of Plenty. Prominent members included James Carroll, Paraire Tomoana, Āpirana Ngata, Te Rangi Hīroa (who was a founding member), and Māui Pōmare. The most important concern of the group was the improvement of Māori health and welfare.

Most members of the Party believed that in order to prosper, Māori needed to adopt European ways of life, particularly Western medicine and education. At times, especially earlier in their careers, they offended older and more traditional Māori by attempting to abolish traditional practices. Later they developed more sensitivity and tended to present Western ways as similar to pre-European traditions. Ngata in particular also realised that Māori culture was in danger of being corrupted or swamped by European culture, and encouraged the revival of many Māori arts and crafts, such as kapa haka and carving. He also recorded many waiata and other forms of Māori literature, ensuring its preservation.

== Loss of members ==
As it was a group of like-minded politicians rather than a true party, the Young Māori Party did not survive the retirement, defeat and deaths of its members. Hiroa left parliament in 1914, and by 1930 Carroll and Pomare had both died. Ngata remained in parliament until 1943, when he was defeated by Labour-Rātana candidate Tiaki Omana.

== New Māori ==
The Party was widely admired by Pākehā, who saw their programmes as advancing the Māori race, and by contemporary Māori, who benefitted from their initiatives and admired their ability to work within Pākehā systems. From the 1970s, however, a new generation of activist Māori began to see the Young Māori Party as 'sell outs' who had swallowed the myth of European cultural superiority. They believed that the Party was mistaken in believing that if Māori adopted European ways, they would be treated as equals. Recently this perception has been revised by historians such as Ranginui Walker and James Belich, who emphasise the achievements of the Party, especially Ngata, and stress that their strategy of co-operation was effective in the context of its time.
