= Marie Stewart (farmer) =

Poultry farmer and promoter, community leader (1898–1983)

Marion Watson Stewart MBE (1898–1983) was a notable New Zealand poultry farmer, promoter, and community leader.

She was born in Manchester, Lancashire, England, in 1898.

In the 1972 Queen's Birthday Honours, Stewart was appointed as a Member of the New Zealand Order of Merit, for her services to the community.
