= Karaitiana Takamoana =

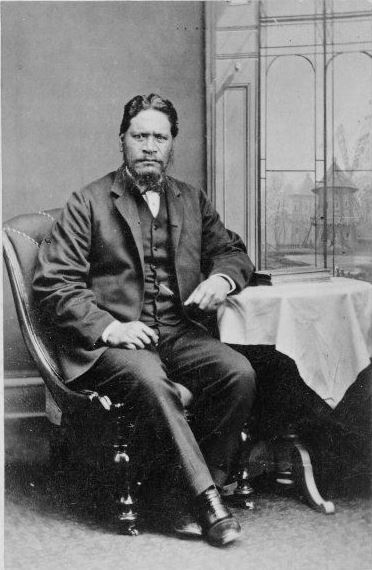

Member of the New Zealand Parliament for Eastern Maori
- In office 1871–1879
- Preceded by: Tareha Te Moananui
- Succeeded by: Henare Tomoana

Personal details
- Born: Napier
- Died: 24 February 1879
- Party: Independent
- Profession: Soldier, Politician

Military service
- Allegiance: Ngāti Kahungunu
- Battles/wars: Musket Wars; New Zealand Wars; East Cape War; Te Kooti's War

Karaitiana Takamoana (died 24 February 1879) was a Māori chief of Ngāti Kahungunu, and a New Zealand Member of Parliament for the Eastern Maori electorate.

Recognised by many as a founding father of the modern Ngāti Kahungunu iwi, he was a veteran of the Musket Wars and the East Coast campaigns of the New Zealand Wars, including the East Cape War and Te Kooti's War.

He represented the Eastern Maori electorate from 1871 until 1879, when he died.

== Early life ==
Takamoana was said to have been born in Wairarapa to mother Te Rotohenga and father Tini-ki-runga. He was of the Ngāti Hawea hapū of Ngāti Kahungunu iwi. Takamoana derived chiefly rank among Ngāti Te Whatu-i-āpiti and Ngati Kahungunu in Heretaunga through his mother, Te Rotohenga, also known as Winipere. Henare Tomoana, also a prominent politician, was his half-brother.

The missionary William Colenso christened him Karaitiana, and also taught him to read and write.

== Musket Wars ==
In the 1820s Takamoana fought at the battle of Te Roto-a-Tara against northern tribes. Around 1824, Takamoana was captured at Te Pakake pa and taken captive by Waikato forces who invaded the Mahia area, but was later released.

== Political career ==
New Zealand Parliament
Years	Term	Electorate	Party
1871–1875	5th	Eastern Māori	Independent
1876–1879	6th	Eastern Māori	Independent

After an unsuccessful attempt in 1868, Takamoana entered Parliament in 1871 as member for Eastern Māori, succeeding Tareha Te Moananui. Takamoana held office until his death in 1879.

== Later life ==
Karaitiana Takamoana is said to have had three wives in the 1870s, with some speculating he could have renounced his Christianity. When Takamoana died at Napier on 24 February 1879, he was said to be between 60 and 70 years old. He was buried at Pakowhai in a brick tomb opposite the site of his house.

New Zealand Parliament
Preceded by Tareha Te Moananui	Member of Parliament for Eastern Maori; 1871–1879	Succeeded by Henare Tomoana
