= Heretaunga Plains =

Alluvial plain in the Hawke's Bay Region, New Zealand

- Plain
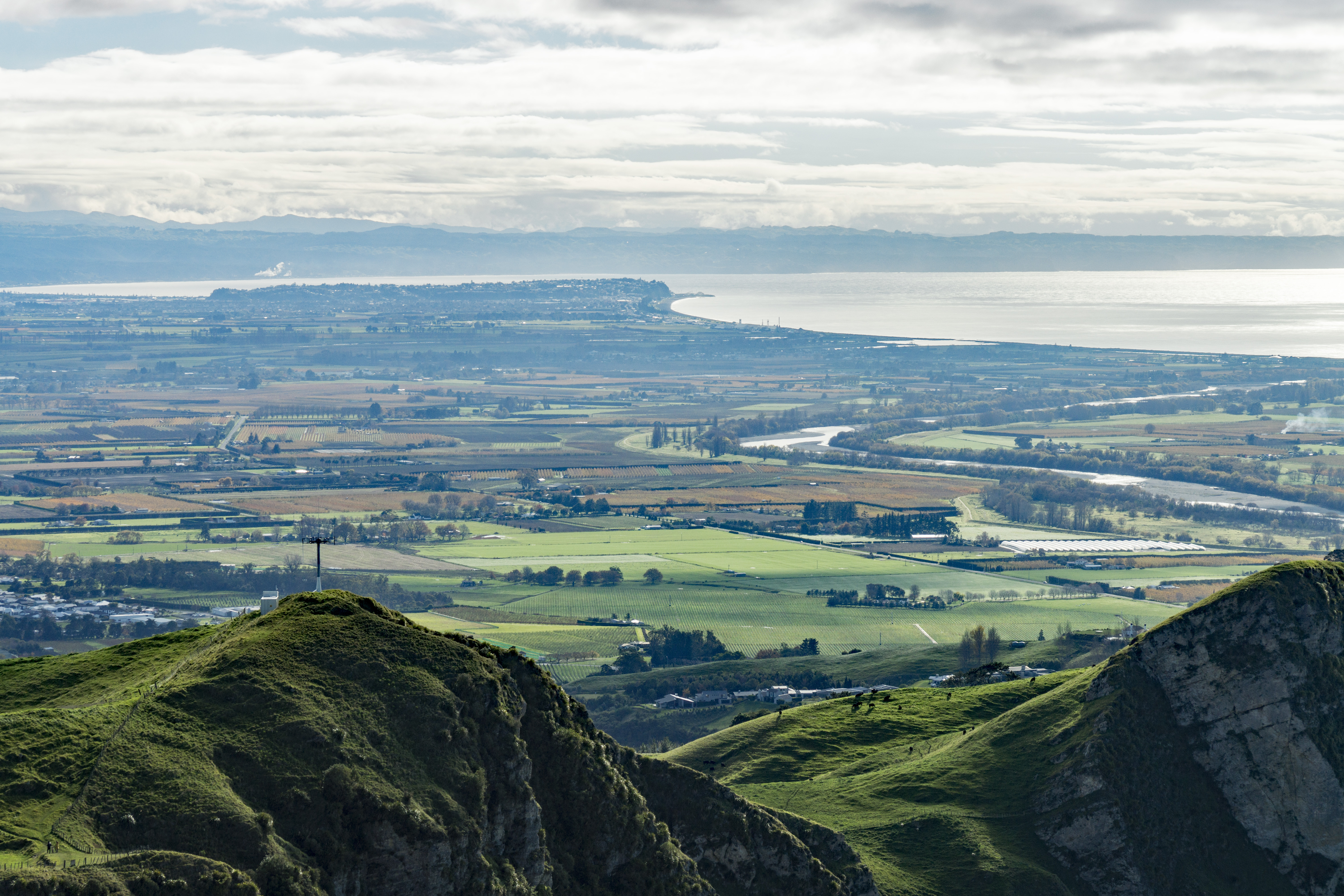
- View from Te Mata Peak of the Heretaunga Plains, looking north towards Napier

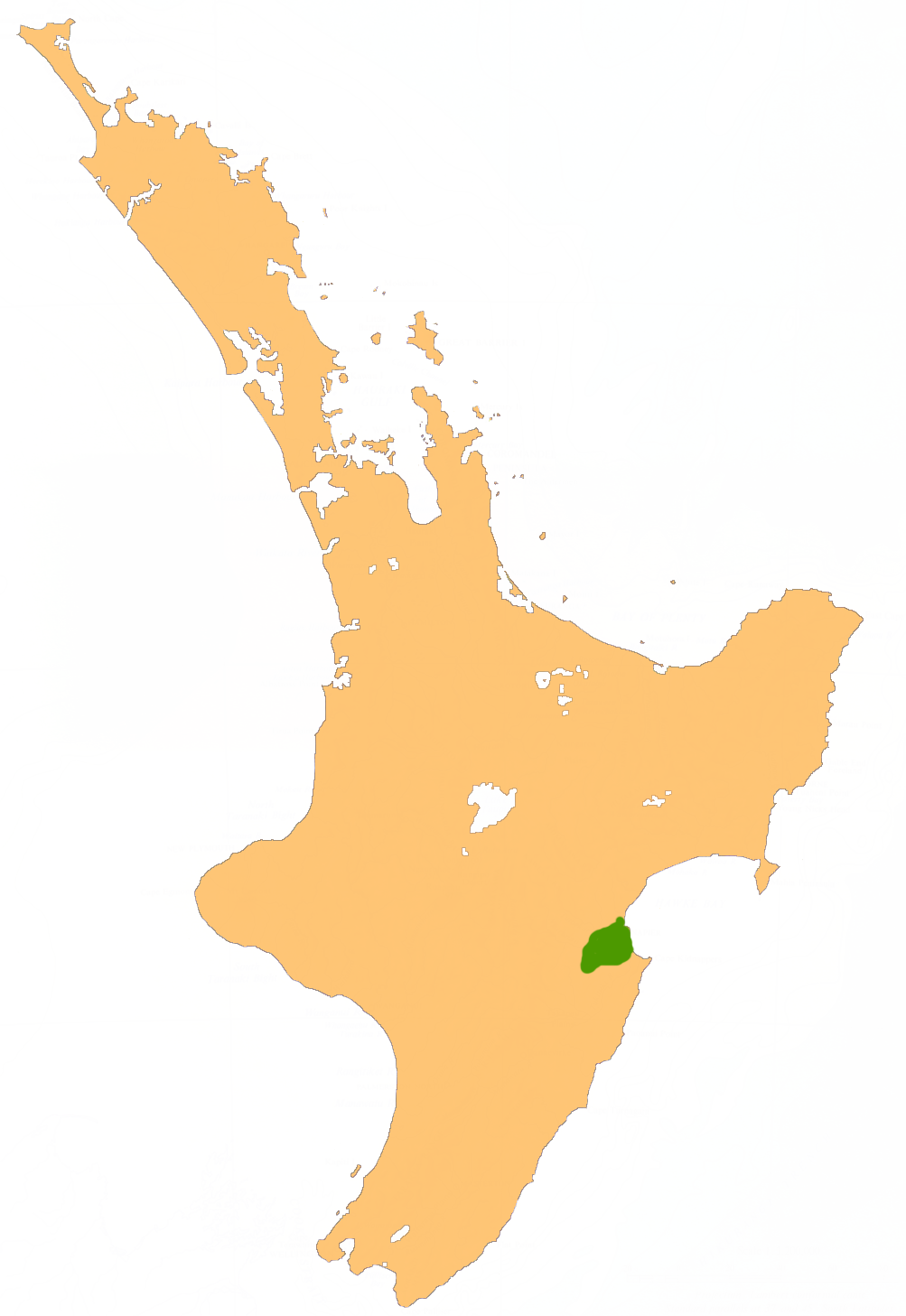
- Location of the Heretaunga Plains on the North Island
- Coordinates: 39.6°S 176.7°E
- Location: Hawke's Bay Region
- Age: 250,000 years

The Heretaunga Plains is a 300 square kilometres (120 sq mi) alluvial plain at the southern end of Hawke Bay on the east coast of the North Island of New Zealand. The cities of Napier and Hastings are on the plain, as well as the towns of Havelock North and Clive.

The plain was formed over the last 250,000 years from sediment deposited by the Tūtaekurī, Ngaruroro and Tukituki Rivers and from coastal marine deposits. It consists of layers of gravel, sand and silt. Permeable gravel beds form aquifers and the artesian groundwater provides 85% of the requirements for public water supply, irrigation and industrial use on the Heretaunga Plains and adjacent areas.

The fertile soil, the warm, dry climate of the area, and the water for irrigation make the plain an excellent site for horticulture and agriculture. Half of the total New Zealand production of fruit, vegetables and grapes is on the Heretaunga Plains. It is one of New Zealand's leading wine producing areas.

The Heretaunga Plains are named after a carved wharenui (meeting house) at Whatonga, and Māori migrating south have taken the name with them and given it to a watercourse now known as the Hutt River.
