= Te Pareihe =

Te Pareihe (?–1844) was a notable New Zealand tribal leader. Of Māori descent, he identified with the Ngāti Te Whatuiāpiti iwi.
