= Ngāti Rakaipaaka =

Māori hapū (subtribe) in New Zealand

- Iwi (tribe) in Māoridom
- Rohe (region): Nūhaka, Hawke's Bay
- Waka (canoe): Tākitimu
- Population: 1,317
- Website: https://www.ngatirakaipaaka.iwi.nz/

Ngāti Rakaipaaka is a Māori iwi (tribe), from the Nūhaka area of northern Hawke's Bay on New Zealand's North Island. It is one of the tribes of East Coast of the North Island of New Zealand that form Ngāti Kahungunu.

== Marae and wharenui ==
=== Northern Hawke's Bay ===
Ngāti Rakaipaaka has six marae (meeting grounds) and wharenui (meeting houses) in the Nūhaka area of northern Hawke's Bay:

- Kahungunu (Te Tāhinga) marae and Kahungunu wharenui on Ihaka Street
- Tamakahu marae and Tamakahu wharenui on State Highway 2
- Tāne-nui-a-Rangi marae and Tāne-nui-a-Rangi wharenui on State Highway 2
- Te Kotahitanga marae and Unity Hall wharenui on Epanaia Street
- Te Manutai marae and Te Manutai wharenui on State Highway 2
- Te Poho o Te Rehu (Te Rehu) marae and Te Poho o Te Rehu wharenui on Pomana Pā Road

=== Wairarapa ===
Ngāti Rakaipaaka is associated with one marae (meeting ground) and wharenui (meeting house) in the Martinborough area of Wairarapa:

- Kohunui marae and Te Tihi o Tuhirangi wharenui on Pirinoa Road
