= Results of the 2022 New Zealand territorial authority elections in Hawke's Bay =

2022 New Zealand territorial authority elections (Hawke's Bay)
- 8 October 2022
- Turnout: 39,323 (34.21% ▼13.88 pp)
- 4 of 4 local councils
Party	Councils	+/–
No majority	4	0
This lists parties that won seats. See the complete results below.
- 4 mayors and 41 local councillors
Party	Seats	+/–
Mayors
Independent	4	0
Local councillors
Independent	39	0
Working Together	2	+2
This lists parties that won seats. See the complete results below.

Elections for the territorial authorities of New Zealand were held from 16 September until 8 October 2022 as part of that year's nation-wide local elections. 706 local councillors and 66 mayors were elected across 66 of 67 councils.

4 territorial authorities are primarily within the Hawke's Bay Region. 4 mayors and 41 local councillors were elected. All 4 incumbent mayors were re-elected and no group gained or held a majority on any council.

== Maps ==

Independent hold	Independent gain
	Working Together gain

== Summary ==
=== Overall ===
Council	Electoral system	Seats	Mayor	Councillors	Control	Turnout	Details	Refs
Wairoa	FPP	6	▌ Independent hold	▌ Independent 6 ( 0)	▌ No majority	2,864; 51.48% ▲0.05 pp	Details	
Hastings	FPP	15	▌ Independent hold	▌ Independent 15 (▼2)	▌ No majority	15,616; 33.72% ▼10.62 pp	Details	
Napier	FPP	12	▌ Independent hold	▌ Independent 10 (▼1) ▌ Working Together 2 (▲2)	▌ No majority	18,451; 40.14% ▼10.65 pp	Details	
Central Hawke's Bay	FPP	8	▌ Independent hold	▌ Independent 8 ( 0)	▌ No majority	2,392; 44.31% ▼10.76 pp	Details	
4 of 4 councils		41						

=== Mayors ===
Territorial authority	Incumbent	Elected	Runner-up	Details	Refs
Wairoa	Craig Little (Ind)		Benita Cairns (Ind)	Details	
Hastings	Sandra Hazlehurst (Ind)		unopposed	Details	
Napier	Kirsten Wise (Ind)		Nigel Simpson (Ind)	Details	
Central Hawke's Bay	Alex Walker (Ind)		unopposed	Details	
^{R} did not run for re-election

=== Candidates ===
Party / ticket	Mayors				Councillors			
Party / ticket	2019	Candidates	Elected	+/−	2019	Candidates	Elected	+/−
Independent	4	10	4	0	39	69	39	0
Working Together	no candidates				(new)	2	2	▲2
Labour	no candidates				1	0	0	▼1
Seats:	4	10	4	0	40	71	41	▲1

== Wairoa District Council ==
2022 Wairoa District Council election
- 8 October 2022
- Turnout: 2,864 (51.48% ▲0.05 pp)
- Mayor
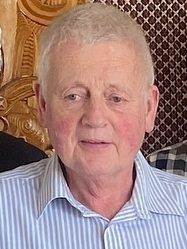
		Ind
Candidate	Craig Little	Benita Cairns
Party	Independent	Independent
Popular vote	1,486	780
Percentage	51.89%	27.23%
	Ind	Ind
Candidate	Simon Mutonhori	Murray Olsen
Party	Independent	Independent
Popular vote	437	168
Percentage	15.26%	5.87%
Mayor before election
Craig Little
Independent
Elected mayor
Craig Little
Independent
- Councillors
- 6 seats on the governing body of Wairoa District Council; 4 seats needed for a majority
Party	Seats	+/–
Independent	6	0
This lists parties that won seats. See the complete results below.
Control before	Control after
No majority	No majority

=== 2022 Wairoa mayoral election ===
2022 Wairoa mayoral election
Party	Candidate	Votes	%	±%
Independent	Craig Little^{†}	1,486	51.89	−19.62
Independent	Benita Cairns	780	27.23	(new)
Independent	Simon Mutonhori	437	15.26	(new)
Independent	Murray Olsen	168	5.87	(new)
Independent	Jennifer Takuta-Moses	51	1.78	(new)
Informal votes		3	0.10	−0.04
Blank votes		32	1.12	−1.24
Turnout		2,864	51.48	+0.05
Registered electors		5,563		
Independent hold				
^{†} incumbent

=== Wairoa general ward ===
2022 Wairoa general ward election
Party	Candidate	Votes	%	±%
Independent	Denise Eaglesome-Karekare^{†}	1,143	61.72	−5.66
Independent	Jeremy Harker^{†}	1,115	60.21	−4.17
Independent	Roz Thomas	938	50.65	(new)
Independent	Hine Flood^{†}	650	35.10	−13.99
Independent	Waipatu Winitana	466	25.16	−0.55
Independent	Ngaire Culshaw	353	19.06	(new)
Independent	Murray Olsen	329	17.76	−2.91
Informal votes		0	0.00	−0.11
Blank votes		32	1.73	+0.37
Turnout		1,852	57.86	+1.92
Registered electors		3,201		
Independent hold				
Independent hold				
Independent gain from Independent				
^{†} incumbent

=== Wairoa Māori ward ===
2022 Wairoa Māori ward election
Party	Candidate	Votes	%	±%
Independent	Benita Cairns	672	66.40	(new)
Independent	Chaans Tumataroa-Clarke^{†}	577	57.02	−9.55
Independent	Melissa Kaimoana^{†}	503	49.70	−2.47
Independent	Danika Goldsack^{†}	373	36.86	+2.22
Independent	Wayne Taylor	196	19.37	+5.57
Independent	Jennifer Takuta-Moses	170	16.80	+2.80
Informal votes		3	0.30	+0.10
Blank votes		30	2.96	+1.55
Turnout		1,012	42.85	−2.12
Registered electors		2,362		
Independent gain from Independent				
Independent hold				
Independent hold				
^{†} incumbent

== Hastings District Council ==
2022 Hastings District Council election
- 8 October 2022
- Turnout: 15,616 (33.72% ▼10.62 pp)
- Mayor
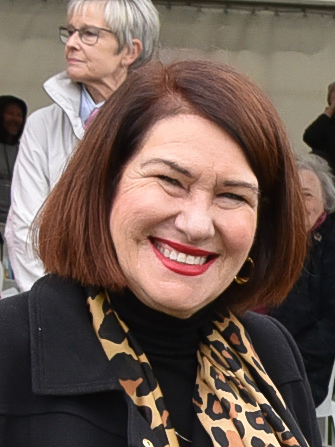
Candidate	Sandra Hazlehurst
Party	Independent
Popular vote	Unopposed
Mayor before election
Sandra Hazlehurst
Independent
Elected mayor
Sandra Hazlehurst
Independent
- Councillors
- 15 seats on the governing body of Hastings District Council; 8 seats needed for a majority
Party	Seats	+/–
Independent	15	+2
This lists parties that won seats. See the complete results below.
Control before	Control after
No majority	No majority

=== 2022 Hastings mayoral election ===
2022 Hastings mayoral election
Party	Candidate	Votes	%	±%
Independent	Sandra Hazelhurst^{†}	elected unopposed		
Registered electors		58,037		
Independent hold				
^{†} incumbent

=== Mōhaka general ward ===
2022 Mōhaka general ward election
Party	Candidate	Votes	%	±%
Independent	Tania Kerr^{†}	elected unopposed		
Registered electors		4,103		
Independent hold				
^{†} incumbent

=== Heretaunga general ward ===
2022 Heretaunga general ward election
Party	Candidate	Votes	%	±%
Independent	Alwyn Corban^{†}	elected unopposed		
Independent	Ann Redstone^{†}	elected unopposed		
Registered electors		7,624		
Independent hold				
Independent hold				
^{†} incumbent

=== Hastings-Havelock North general ward ===
2022 Hastings-Havelock North general ward election
Party	Candidate	Votes	%	±%
Independent	Eileen Lawson^{†}	7,135	62.05	+0.32
Independent	Wendy Schollum^{†}	7,027	61.11	+12.31
Independent	Malcolm Dixon^{†}	6,530	56.79	+2.37
Independent	Michael Fowler	6,508	56.60	(new)
Independent	Kevin Watkins^{†}	6,086	52.93	−0.23
Independent	Damon Harvey^{†}	5,234	45.52	−13.78
Independent	Simon J H Nixon^{†}	4,749	41.30	−2.32
Independent	Rizwaana (Riz) Latiff	3,585	31.18	−5.81
Independent	Melanie Lorraine Petrowski	3,221	28.01	(new)
Independent	Gilly Lawrence	2,614	22.73	(new)
Independent	Rion Roben	2,601	22.62	+0.80
Independent	Alex Cameron	2,422	21.06	(new)
Independent	Sayeed Ahmed	2,187	19.02	−7.21
Independent	Kim Priest	2,149	18.69	(new)
Informal votes		24	0.21	+0.11
Blank votes		56	0.49	−1.33
Turnout		11,498	38.33	−6.59
Registered electors		29,999		
Independent hold				
Independent hold				
Independent hold				
Independent gain from Independent				
Independent hold				
Independent hold				
Independent hold				
^{†} incumbent

=== Flaxmere general ward ===
2022 Flaxmere general ward election
Party	Candidate	Votes	%	±%
Independent	Henry Heke	376	40.26	(new)
Independent	Michael Ngahuka	279	29.87	(new)
Independent	Marcelle Raheke	156	16.70	(new)
Independent	Victoria Fuata'i	85	9.10	(new)
Informal votes		7	0.75	+0.51
Blank votes		21	2.25	+1.33
Turnout		934	22.58	−9.64
Registered electors		4,136		
Independent gain from Labour				

=== Kahurānaki general ward ===
2022 Kahurānaki general ward election
Party	Candidate	Votes	%	±%
Independent	Marcus Buddo	882	55.72	(new)
Independent	John Roil	687	43.40	(new)
Informal votes		0	0.00	n/a
Blank votes		14	0.88	n/a
Turnout		1,583	41.70	n/a
Registered electors		3,796		
Independent gain from Independent				

=== Takitimu Māori ward ===
2022 Takitimu Māori ward election
Party	Candidate	Votes	%	±%
Independent	Ana Apatu	963	60.15	(new)
Independent	Kellie Jessup	776	48.47	(new)
Independent	Renata Nepe	666	41.60	(new)
Independent	Dallas Rahui Te Ahuru Adams	549	34.29	(new)
Independent	Sarah Greening-Smith	438	27.36	(new)
Independent	Kiri Goodspeed	388	24.23	(new)
Independent	Hohepa Cooper	318	19.86	(new)
Informal votes		0	0.00	n/a
Blank votes		0	0.00	n/a
Turnout		1,601	19.11	n/a
Registered electors		8,379		
Independent win (new seat)				
Independent win (new seat)				
Independent win (new seat)				

== Napier City Council ==
2022 Napier City Council election
- 8 October 2022
- Turnout: 18,451 (40.14% ▼10.65 pp)
- Mayor
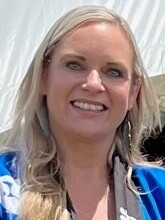
		Ind	Ind
Candidate	Kirsten Wise	Nigel Simpson	John C Smith
Party	Independent	Independent	Independent
Popular vote	9,559	7,466	948
Percentage	51.81%	40.46%	5.14%
Mayor before election
Kirsten Wise
Independent
Elected mayor
Kirsten Wise
Independent
- Councillors
- 12 seats on the governing body of Napier City Council; 7 seats needed for a majority
Party	Seats	+/–
Independent	10	−2
Working Together	2	+2
This lists parties that won seats. See the complete results below.
Control before	Control after
No majority	No majority

=== 2022 Napier mayoral election ===
2022 Napier mayoral election
Party	Candidate	Votes	%	±%
Independent	Kirsten Wise^{†}	9,559	51.81	−10.46
Independent	Nigel Simpson	7,466	40.46	(new)
Independent	John C Smith	948	5.14	(new)
Informal votes		15	0.08	−0.04
Blank votes		413	2.24	+0.99
Turnout		18,451	40.14	−10.65
Registered electors		45,963		
Independent hold				
^{†} incumbent

=== Ahuriri ward ===
2022 Ahuriri ward election
Party	Candidate	Votes	%	±%
Independent	Hayley Browne^{†}	1,929	49.34	−13.18
Independent	Keith Price^{†}	1,902	48.64	+17.70
Independent	Louise Burnside	1,154	29.51	(new)
Independent	Karl Goodchild	1,111	28.41	(new)
Independent	Leanne Cotter-Arlidge	737	18.85	(new)
Informal votes		27	0.69	+0.32
Blank votes		59	1.51	−1.82
Turnout		3,910	47.07	−10.49
Registered electors		8,307		
Independent hold				
Independent hold				
^{†} incumbent

=== Onekawa-Tamatea ward ===
2022 Onekawa-Tamatea ward election
Party	Candidate	Votes	%	±%
Working Together	Richard McGrath^{†}	1,903	71.43	+0.28
Working Together	Annette Brosnan^{†}	1,853	69.56	+13.03
Independent	Te Kira Lawrence	780	29.28	(new)
Informal votes		1	0.04	+0.04
Blank votes		48	1.80	+0.03
Turnout		2,664	36.42	−12.37
Registered electors		7,314		
Working Together gain from Independent				
Working Together gain from Independent				
^{†} incumbent

=== Nelson Park ward ===
2022 Nelson Park ward election
Party	Candidate	Votes	%	±%
Independent	Greg (Grego) Mawson^{†}	2,298	68.35	+29.34
Independent	Maxine Boag^{†}	2,142	63.71	−2.68
Independent	Sally Crown^{†}	1,851	55.06	+12.43
Independent	Juliet Greig	1,767	52.56	(new)
Independent	Nigel Olsen	1,123	33.40	(new)
Independent	Liz Gear	428	12.73	(new)
Informal votes		2	0.06	+0.02
Blank votes		67	1.99	−1.26
Turnout		3,362	27.24	−10.67
Registered electors		12,344		
Independent hold				
Independent hold				
Independent hold				
Independent gain from Independent				
^{†} incumbent

=== Taradale ward ===
2022 Taradale ward election
Party	Candidate	Votes	%	±%
Independent	Graeme K Taylor^{†}	5,909	69.40	+24.08
Independent	Nigel Simpson^{†}	5,825	68.41	+23.09
Independent	Ronda Chrystal^{†}	5,121	60.14	+12.15
Independent	Chad Tareha	4,181	49.10	(new)
Independent	Maria Roberts	3,309	38.86	(new)
Informal votes		1	0.01	−0.03
Blank votes		127	1.49	−1.24
Turnout		8,515	47.31	−9.92
Registered electors		17,998		
Independent hold				
Independent hold				
Independent hold				
Independent gain from Independent				
^{†} incumbent

== Central Hawke's Bay District Council ==
2025 Central Hawke's Bay District Council election
- 8 October 2022
- Turnout: 2,392 (44.31% ▼10.76 pp)
- Mayor
	Ind
Candidate	Alex Walker
Party	Independent
Popular vote	Unopposed
Mayor before election
Alex Walker
Independent
Elected mayor
Alex Walker
Independent
- Councillors
- 8 seats on the governing body of Central Hawke's Bay District Council; 5 seats needed for a majority
Party	Seats	+/–
Independent	8	0
This lists parties that won seats. See the complete results below.
Control before	Control after
No majority	No majority

=== 2022 Central Hawke's Bay mayoral election ===
2022 Central Hawke's Bay mayoral election
Party	Candidate	Votes	%	±%
Independent	Alex Walker^{†}	elected unopposed		
Registered electors		10,695		
Independent hold				
^{†} incumbent

=== Aramoana-Ruahine ward ===
2022 Aramoana-Ruahine ward election
Party	Candidate	Votes	%	±%
Independent	Tim Aitken^{†}	elected unopposed		
Independent	Jerry Greer^{†}	elected unopposed		
Independent	Brent Muggeridge^{†}	elected unopposed		
Independent	Kate Taylor^{†}	elected unopposed		
Registered electors		5,297		
Independent hold				
Independent hold				
Independent hold				
Independent hold				
^{†} incumbent

=== Ruataniwha ward ===
2022 Ruataniwha ward election
Party	Candidate	Votes	%	±%
Independent	Pip Burne	1,964	82.11	(new)
Independent	Gerard Minehan^{†}	1,934	80.85	n/a
Independent	Kelly Annand^{†}	1,703	71.20	n/a
Independent	Exham Wicham^{†}	1,324	55.35	n/a
Independent	Kaye Harrison	972	40.64	(new)
Informal votes		1	0.04	n/a
Blank votes		2	0.08	n/a
Turnout		2,392	44.31	n/a
Registered electors		5,398		
Independent gain from Independent				
Independent hold				
Independent hold				
Independent hold				
^{†} incumbent

== See also ==
- 2022 Hawke's Bay Regional Council election
