= Bayden Barber =

New Zealand politician and Māori leader (born 1973/74)

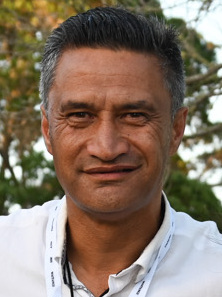
- Barber in 2025

Chair of Ngāti Kahungunu Iwi Inc
- Incumbent
- Assumed office 26 April 2022
- Preceded by: Ngahiwi Tomoana

Hastings district councillor for the Hastings-Havelock North ward
- In office 14 October 2016 – 13 October 2022

Personal details
- Born: Bayden Bernard Barber; 1973 or 1974 (age 52–53) Hastings, New Zealand
- Party: Independent
- Spouse: Myra
- Children: 7
- Education: University of Waikato (BMS)

Bayden Bernard Barber (born 1973 or 1974) is a New Zealand politician and Māori leader. He is currently the chair of Ngāti Kahungunu Iwi Incorporated, the legal entity representing the people and hapū of Ngāti Kahungunu iwi. From 2016 until 2022 he was a Hastings district councillor.

== Early life and education ==
Barber was born in Hastings in 1973 or 1974 to Edward Barber and Marama Tiakitai, the oldest of four children. Through his mother he is a descendant of Ngāti Kurukuru chief Tiakitai. On his father's side he affiliates to Ngāti Kahungunu ki Te Wairoa and Ngāti Ruapani and on his mother's side he affiliates to Ngāti Hinewaka, Rangitāne, and Ngāti Kahungunu ki te Wairarapa. Barber credits his grandmother for fostering his "sense of kaitiakitanga".

He went to school in Hastings and then later attended the private Mormon secondary school Church College of New Zealand in Hamilton. He served his Mormon mission in Wellington and the South Island.

He then went and studied a Bachelor of Management Studies in Māori Resource Management at the University of Waikato, where he met his wife. He also earned a postgraduate diploma in strategic management there, graduating in 1999. His first job after graduating was working at a Māori health provider. Afterwards, he worked with the Hawke's Bay DHB before starting his own consultancy business specialising in Māori business.

He became chair of Waimārama Marae in 2012.

== Local politics ==
Barber served for two terms as a councillor on the Hastings District Council, representing the Hastings-Havelock North ward. He had previously been a member on the council's Rural Community Board for the Poukawa subdivision. He said he decided to run for council because there were no Māori at the table.

TVNZ's Te Karere Māori language news programme ran a piece on Barber preceding the 2019 local elections. In it he was shown door-knocking and he promoted housing and water as the key issues of his campaign for re-election. During the 2016–2019 term, Barber was one of three Māori on the council; he encouraged more Māori to vote and to run for office. Also during the term, the council gave voting rights on council committees to appointed mana whenua representatives, which Barber supported.

Barber came second in the 2017 Hastings mayoral by-election, securing 23% of the vote. Fellow incumbent councillor Sandra Hazlehurst defeated him, winning with almost double the number of votes.

Reflecting on his six years on the council, Barber said that there had been a "total quantum shift" with regards to engagement and partnership with mana whenua.

Hastings District Council
Term	Position	Party
2013–2016	Poukawa subdivision on Rural Community Board	Independent
2016–2019	Hastings-Havelock North ward	Independent
2019–2022	Hastings-Havelock North ward	Independent

Election results
Election	Position	Votes	%	Rank	Result	Ref
2013 Hastings District Council election	Community board member	unopposed			elected	
2016 Hastings District Council election	Councillor	6,788	44.85	5th	elected	
2017 Hastings mayoral by-election	Mayor	5,252	23.79	2nd	not elected	
2019 Hastings District Council election	Councillor	7,629	53.10	5th	elected	

== Ngāti Kahungunu Iwi Inc chairmanship ==
=== 2022 election ===
Barber put up his hand to run for the chair position when he learnt that the incumbent, Ngahiwi Tomoana, intended for the 2022–2025 term to be his final. He described the decision as "not easy" and that iwi leadership was something "you've got to take seriously". Barber would be only the second person to hold the role of chair (after Tomoana).

Barber was elected as chair of Ngāti Kahungunu Iwi Inc in April 2022, defeating Tomoana for the position. Barber would have big shoes to fill as Tomoana was the country's longest serving iwi chair, having been in the post for 26 years. Barber had previously been the alternate for Christine Teariki on the iwi board for the Heretaunga rohe ('district' or 'area') from 2007 to 2010. Gianina Schwanecke of Stuff described Barber as "clearly comfortable" in leadership roles and in his vision for the future of his iwi.

At the time of his election as chair, Barber was an incumbent Hastings district councillor; he announced he would not seek re-election on the council. After winning, Barber acknowledged the contributions the outgoing chair had made to Ngāti Kahungunu. He pointed to Three Waters reforms, housing, and economic development as key issues for the iwi, mirroring the issues of his term on council. Climate change and health were also very important to him, with Ngāti Kahungunu members being poorly represented in health statistics. He was excited about the new Māori Health authority.

=== First term ===
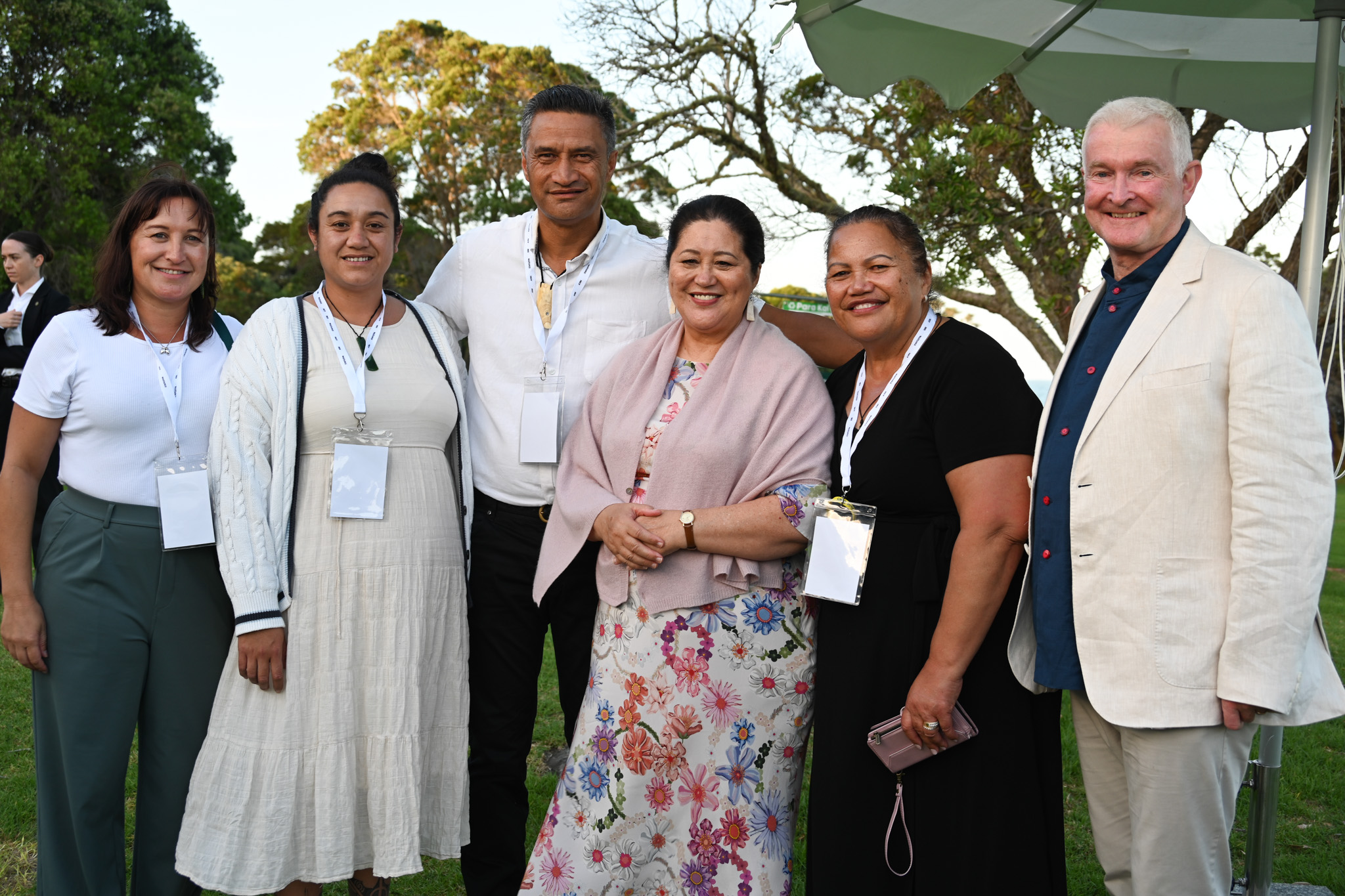
Barber pictured with Governor-General Cindy Kiro at the 2025 National Iwi Chairs Forum Dinner.

==== Cyclone Gabrielle ====
Following Cyclone Gabrielle, Barber raised concerns about the future of marae in the region, saying that Māori communities would have to discuss the future location of them and other community meeting spaces. Several marae had been wiped out in the floods. The iwi board met following the cyclone, receiving reports from each representative on their respective rohe. The iwi used Facebook and their website as communication channels during the aftermath of the disaster.

==== Takitimu Seafoods ====
The iwi-owned Takitimu Seafoods faced massive losses in revenue to the tune of $6.9 million for the 2020/2021 financial year. Barber said it was important that the iwi's assets be running well and that they provide dividends that could be spent on social projects. The business announced in April 2023 that it would close its retail store, online store, and wholesale business in Ahuriri, leading to 33 jobs lost. The business had reportedly lost $15 million for the iwi's asset holdings company. The impact of Cyclone Gabrielle was pointed to as a contributor to the failure, with them having to cease operations for six weeks.

When asked what caused the business to fail after the iwi purchased it in 2019, Barber told Bay Buzz that the business had been trading in "unprecedented" times, with COVID-19 and the cyclone impacting it. With the closure, no fishing operations would be operated by the iwi. Barber said that the iwi had "a responsibility to act in the best interests of all members" and that an independent review and advice from the asset holdings company board meant that they thought the business would continue to need more funding than made sense.

==== Trade with Samoa ====
The iwi was reported to be exploring trade opportunities with Samoa in August 2023. Barber and former chair Ngahiwi Tomoana were part of a delegation to Samoa that month at the invitation of Prime Minister Jacinda Ardern. The visit was for a celebration of the 60th anniversary of the signing of the Treaty of Friendship between New Zealand and Samoa.

The iwi had earlier hosted the Samoan Prime Minister Fiamē Naomi Mata'afa in Hastings in June. Barber pointed to the common whakapapa between Samoa and Ngāti Kahungunu through the Tākitimu waka as a key connection between them.

==== Labour government ====
Barber said that he was "pleased" with the Sixth Labour Government's 2023 budget with regards to funding towards Māori, following a meeting with Minister of Māori Development Willie Jackson which he and various other Māori leaders attended. Barber wanted to secure funding for housing and climate resilience in Hawke's Bay following the devastation brought by Cyclone Gabrielle earlier that year in the region.

==== National government ====
Barber says the Minister for Children Karen Chhour was one of the first ministers he spoke to after the formation of the Sixth National Government. He strongly disagreed with the government's decision to remove Oranga Tamariki's obligation to engage with Māori organisations, saying that the iwi "totally opposed" the move. Ngāti Kahungunu was one of 10 iwi that had made a partnership with OT, and Barber thought it had worked well.

A Ngāti Kahungunu iwi hui ('meeting') was organised by Barber hosted at Waimāmara Marae on 16 December 2023 in response to the National government's policies. A second hui for all iwi was called by Kīngi Tūheitia at Tūrangawaewae on 20 January 2024; Barber attended alongside over 10,000 others. Barber attended a hui in Waitangi and then returned to Hawke's Bay for Waitangi Day 2024 celebrations that were held in Clive and at the Regional Sports Park.

In an op-ed for Bay Buzz in March 2024, he strongly disagreed with the actions of the National government.

==== Hui Taumata ====
In May 2024, the iwi hosted Hui Taumata at Omāhu Marae. In attendance were Kīngi Tūheitia, Rātana church leader Manuao Te Kohamutunga Tamoa, and Sir Robert Gillies (the last surviving 28th Māori Battalion soldier). Kotahitanga ('unity') was the key value of the gathering.

Before the gathering, Barber told Te Ao Māori News that "Iwi Māori need to unify", and that they must "come together as an irresistible force that cannot be ignored".

Te Pāti Māori MP Tākuta Ferris was also there and spoke at the pōwhiri on his party's support for a Māori parliament. Barber spoke on the issue, saying that Māori held their future in their own hands, and shared details of a potential parliament based on one that was formed at Waipatu Marae in 1892. He supported the parliament having both lower and upper houses (unlike the New Zealand Parliament which is unicameral) with traditional leaders providing spiritual guidance.

==== Māori parliament ====
After Te Pāti Māori co-leaders called for a Māori parliament during nationwide protests against the National government's 2024 budget, Radio New Zealand journalist Tuwhenuaroa Natanahira credited Barber with the idea.

==== Māori wards ====
In August 2024, the Hastings District Council held a meeting on whether to keep its Māori ward; the council voted unanimously in favour of keeping it. Barber spoke "passionately" in favour of keeping it at the meeting. Barber would later speak at the launch of the pro-wards For Wards Hawke's Bay group in July 2025. Ngāti Kahungunu Iwi Inc endorsed the pro-wards position at the 2025 local referendums on the issue, encouraging people to vote.

==== National Iwi Chairs Forum in Hastings ====
From 31 October to 2 November 2024, the National Iwi Chairs Forum was held at the Toitoi events centre in Hastings, hosted by Ngāti Kahungunu and various other Post Settlement Government Entities from Hawke's Bay. Barber told Bay Buzz that housing remained a strong priority for the forum. He said the previous Labour government had been "very supportive" of iwi providing housing but he did not think the incumbent National government would be as helpful. He stressed that despite all the "backwards steps", iwi–government relationships were important. He pointed to census figures that showed Māori nearing 1 million population as a sign of strength.

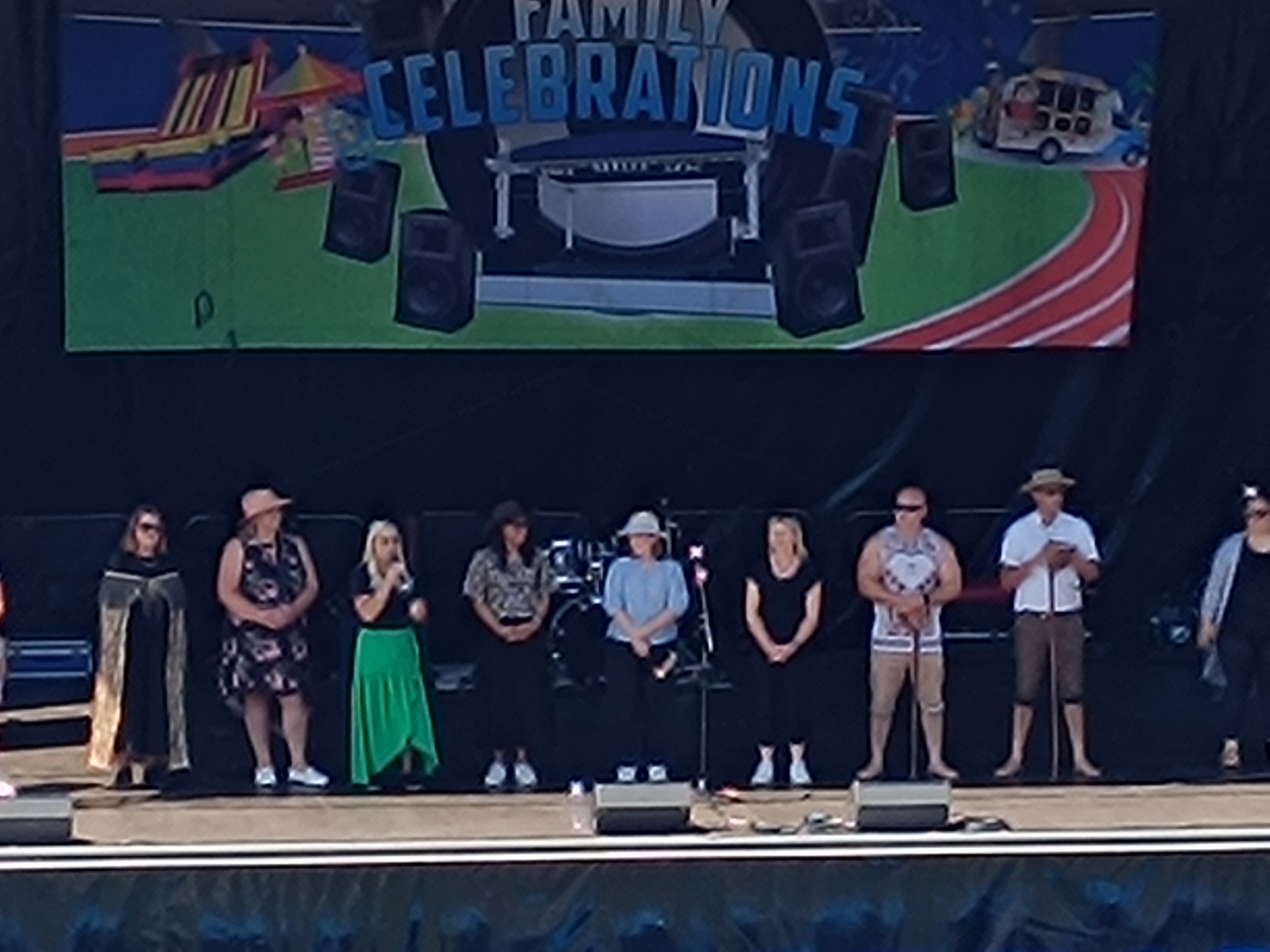
Barber (2nd from right, wearing hat) alongside other Hawke's Bay leaders at Ngāti Kahungunu's 2025 Waitangi Day celebrations.

=== 2025 election ===
Barber was challenged for the chair position at the 2025 iwi elections by Hawke's Bay regional councillor Thompson Hokianga. Barber was re-elected with 62% of the vote to Hokianga's 36%.

=== Second term ===
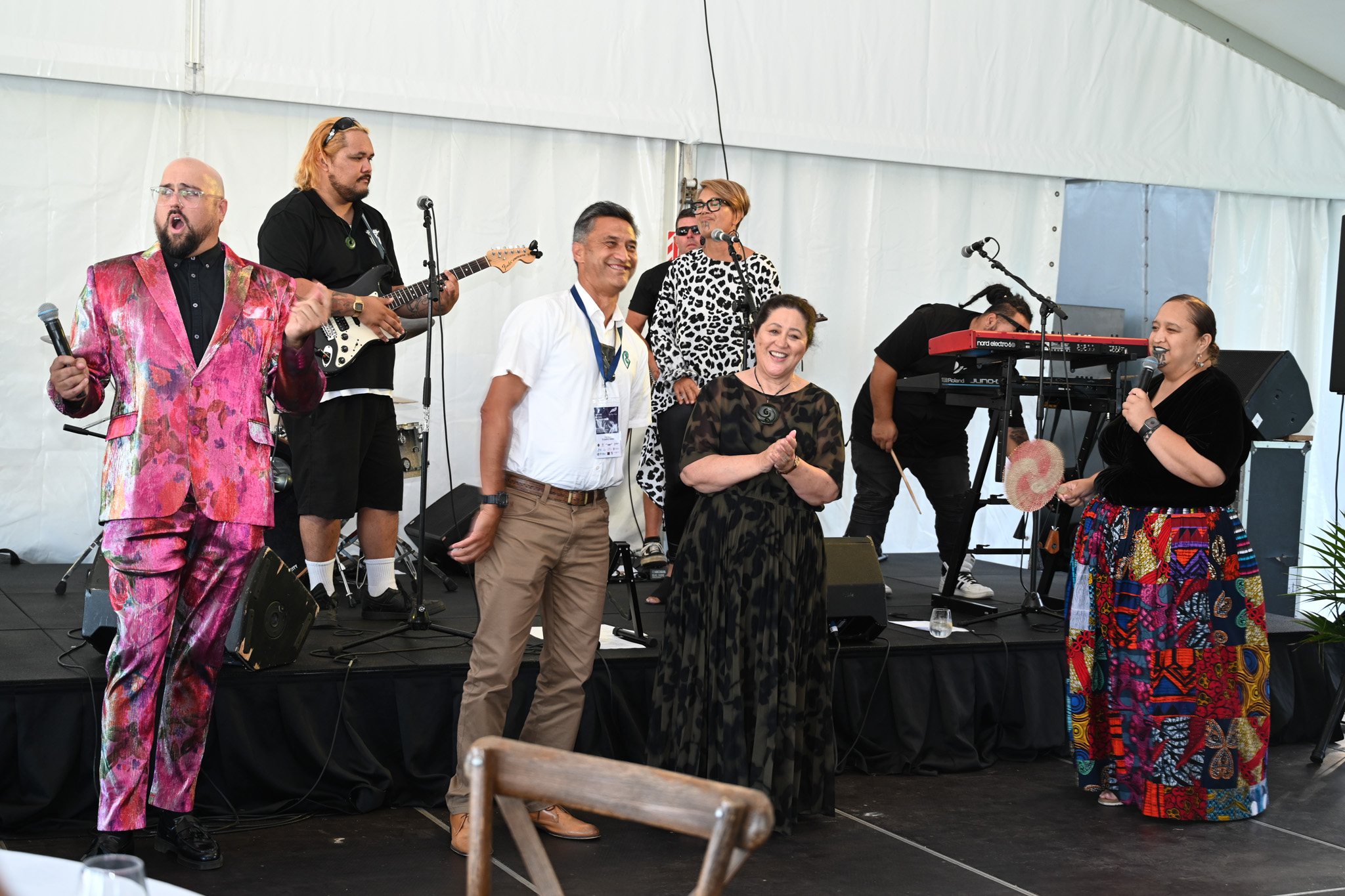
Barber with Governor-General Cindy Kiro at the reception for the Iwi Chairs Forum 2026

==== The Hui interview ====
Following the election, Barber spoke to Julian Wilcox on the Hui. He spoke positively of the new younger members on the iwi board. He listed the geopolitical situation, national politics and the Māori wards debate as some of the bigger challenges the iwi was facing. Economic development and housing were still important issues. He reiterated his commitment to kotahitanga and spoke on the iwi's desire to take back ownership of Kahurānaki Station, which contains the ancestral maunga ('mountain') of the same name; the current owners were looking to sell it. He said working with the incumbent National government was "difficult" but important.

==== Te Pāti Māori caucus division mediation ====
In November 2025, following divisions within the Te Pāti Māori caucus, Barber acted as a liaison between both sides of the division, on behalf of the National Iwi Chairs Forum. He met directly with the party's co-leaders and separately with Tākuta Ferris. He had also spoken to party president John Tamihere on the phone. Barber said that iwi leaders had asked both sides to stop the online "tit-for-tat".

==== Local government amalgamation ====
Following the National government's local government reform push, Barber wrote a letter in July 2026 to the mayors of all four territorial authorities in Hawke's Bay stating the iwi's position that they support one unitary authority for the whole Hawke's Bay region.

==== Horse hīkoi to Parliament ====
Barber led a hīkoi of horses from Waimarama Marae to Parliament in protest of proposed changes by the government to the wording of legislation related to honouring the Treaty of Waitangi. The hīkoi organisers thought the changes "weakened" the position of the Treaty in New Zealand law; Paul Goldsmith said that the coalition government rejected that characterisation.

== Other endeavours ==
Barber owns the consultancy company Wana Consulting alongside his wife. He became deputy chair of Local Government New Zealand's Te Maruata Executive Committee in 2020. He is a commissioner of Te Taura Whiri i te Reo Māori and a trustee of Te Mata Park Trust. He is a chartered member of the NZ Institute of Directors.

From 2016 to 2017 he studied at Te Whare Wānanga o Awanuiārangi where he completed a Bachelor of Māori performing arts. In 2018, he studied a Te Panekiretanga o te reo Māori diploma at Te Whare Wānanga o Aotearoa.

== Personal life ==
Barber has resided in the seaside settlement of Waimārama with his wife Myra Christy since 2001. Together they have seven children.
