= 2025 Hastings District Council election =

Election in New Zealand

- 11 October 2025
- Turnout: 26,759 (45.84% ▲12.12 pp)
- Mayor
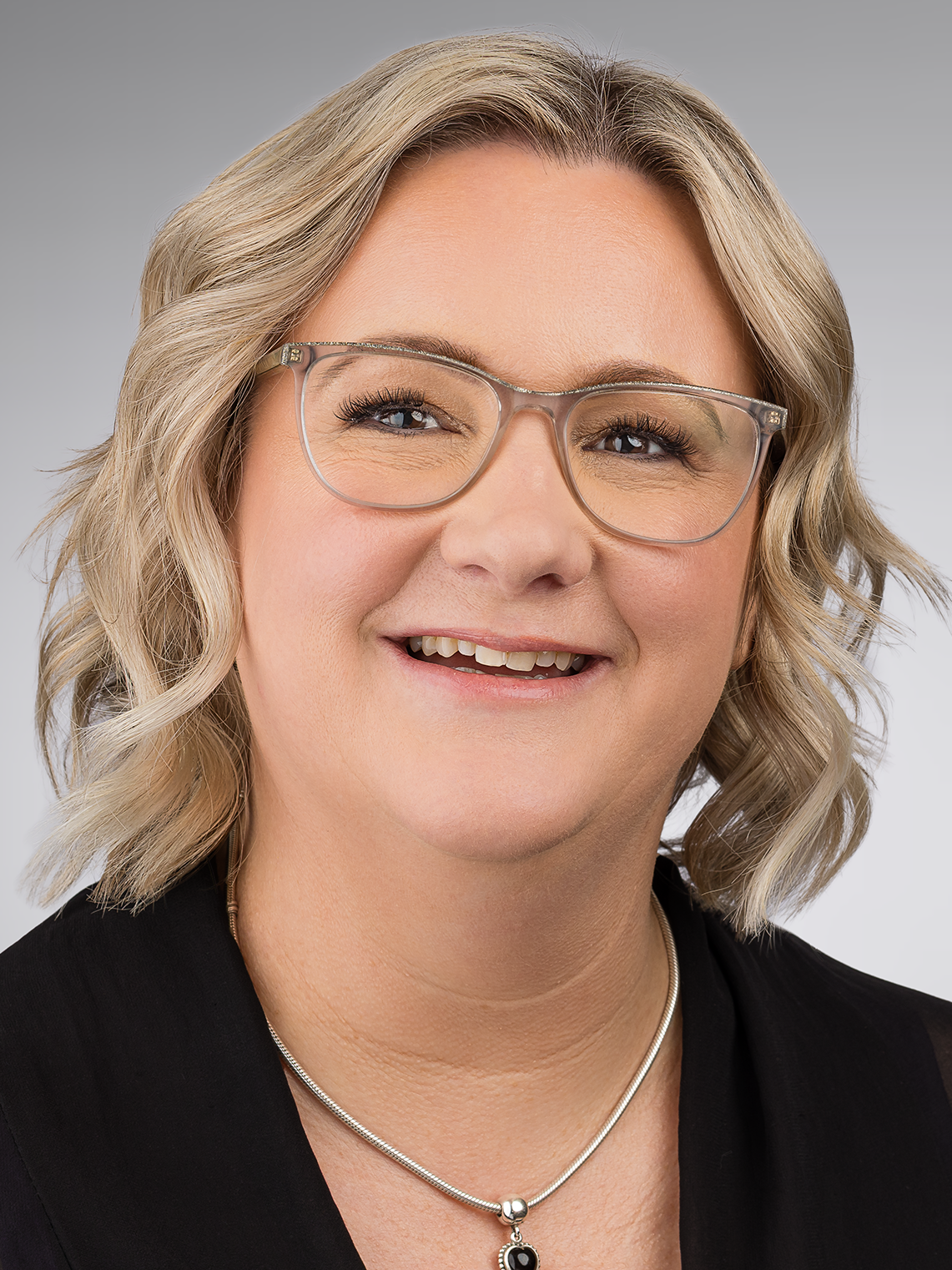

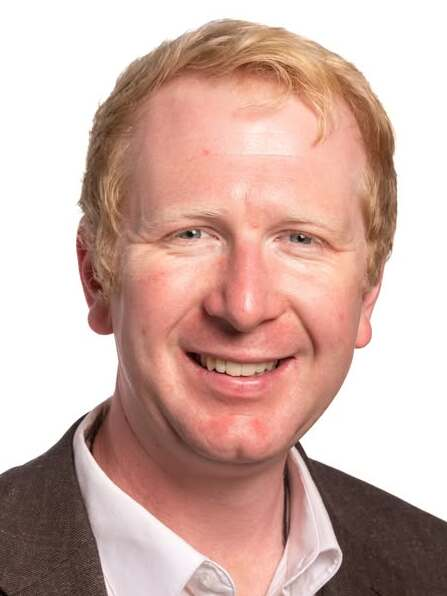

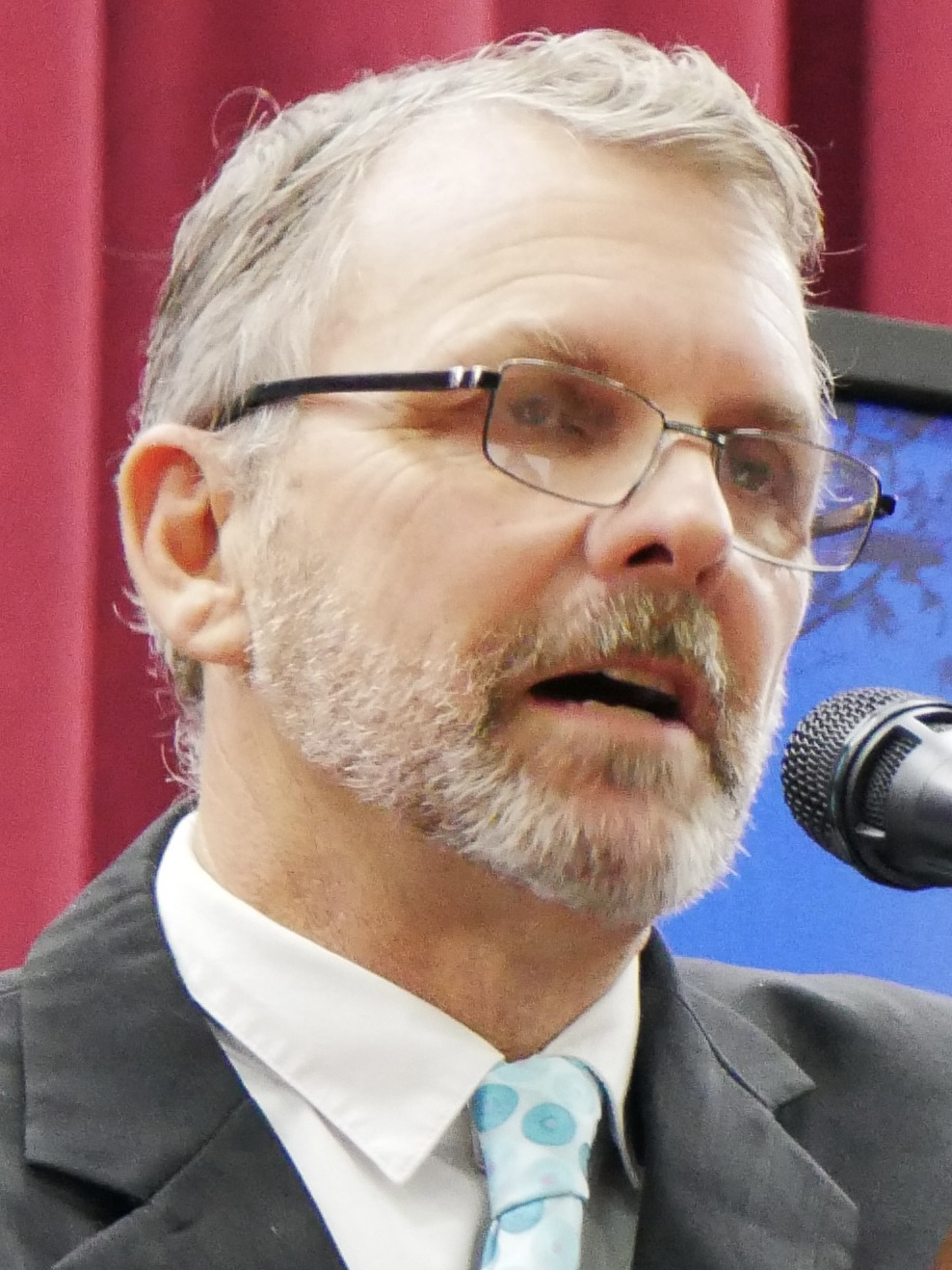

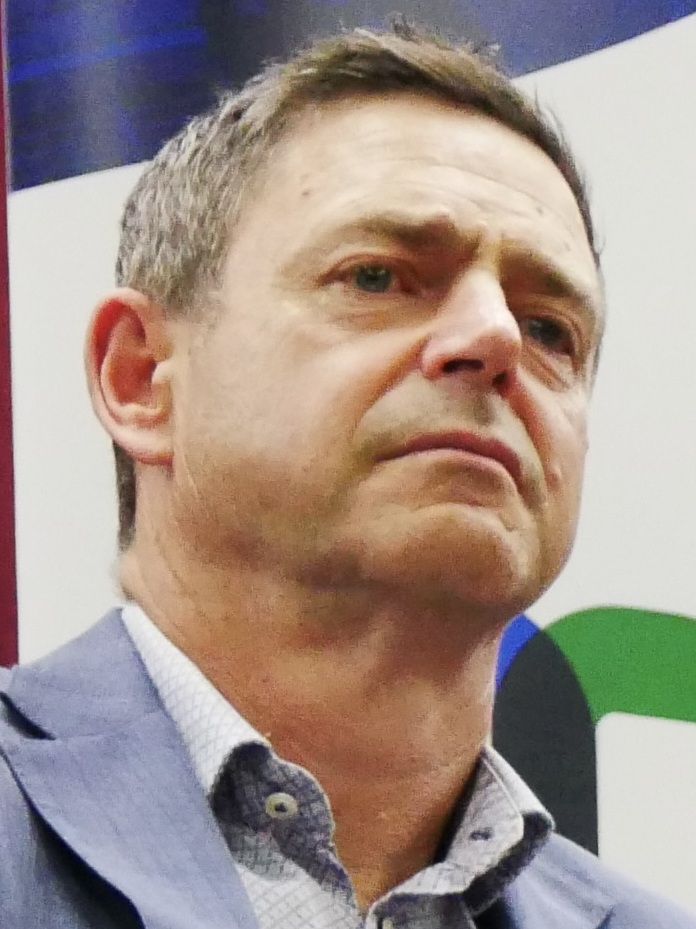
Candidate	Wendy Schollum	Marcus Buddo
Party	Independent	Independent
Popular vote	7,212	6,613
Percentage	26.95%	24.71%
Candidate	Steve Gibson	Damon Harvey
Party	Independent	Independent
Popular vote	5,810	5,569
Percentage	21.71%	20.81%
Mayor before election
Sandra Hazlehurst
Independent
Elected mayor
Wendy Schollum
Independent
- Councillors
- 15 seats on the governing body of Hastings District Council; 8 seats needed for a majority
Party	Seats	+/–
Independent	13	−1
Independent Green	1	+1
CARE for Hastings	1	+1
This lists parties that won seats. See the complete results below.

The 2025 Hastings District Council election was a local election held from 9 September to 11 October in the Hastings District of New Zealand, as part of that year's territorial authority elections and other local elections held nation-wide.

Voters elected the mayor of Hastings and 15 district councillors for the 2025–2028 term of the Hastings District Council. Postal voting and the first-past-the-post voting system were used.

Councillor Wendy Schollum won the mayoralty, with fellow councillor Marcus Buddo coming in second-place.

The council introduced a Māori ward at the 2022 election; in a referendum on its future held at this election (as part of a nation-wide series of referendums) voters elected to remove the Māori ward for future elections.

== Key dates ==
- 4 July 2025: Nominations for candidates opened
- 1 August 2025: Nominations for candidates closed at 12 pm
- 9 September 2025: Voting documents were posted and voting opened
- 11 October 2025: Voting closed at 12 pm and progress/preliminary results published
- 16–19 October 2025: Final results declared.

== Background ==
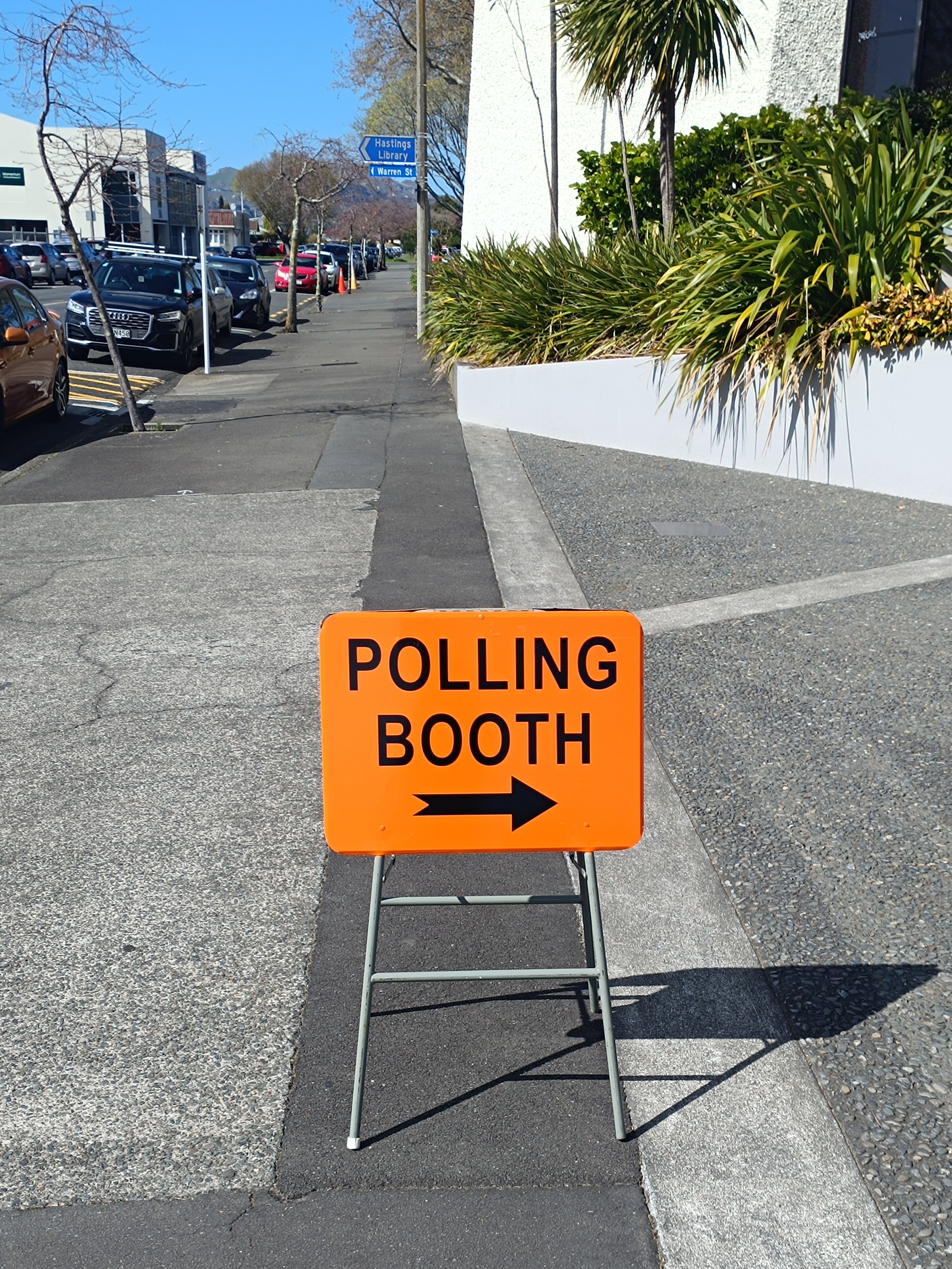
Polling booth sign outside the Hastings District Council building

=== Positions up for election ===
Voters elected fifteen councillors in six wards, as well as the mayor of Hastings. Voters that live in the rural communities of the district also elected members of the Rural Community Board, and six members of a licensing trust were elected by residents of the suburb of Flaxmere.

Voters across the district also elected six members of the Hawke's Bay Regional Council.

=== Cyclone Gabrielle ===
The wider Hawke's Bay region was devastated by Cyclone Gabrielle in February 2023 and the affects of it were still being felt in the district in 2025.

=== Pre-election report ===
Under the Local Government Act 2002, councils must compile a pre-election report to be published and made available to voters. This report details the council's financial position, issues affected the district, and other important factors to consider when voting. The report is prepared by the chief executive of the council, independent of the mayor and councillors.

== Campaign ==
=== Mayor ===
Incumbent mayor Sandra Hazlehurst announced in May that she would not seek re-election to a fourth term. By May, councillor Marcus Buddo had announced his candidacy for mayor, and councillor Damon Harvey was considering it.

Buddo is a 30 year old, fourth generation farmer from Poukawa. Buddo emphasised reducing rates, handling the council's growing debt, cyclone recovery, and housing affordability as key issues for him. Buddo says he has degrees in economics, public health, and politics.

Third-term incumbent councillor Wendy Schollum announced her candidacy for mayor, launching her campaign on 24 June at St Andrew's Hall. She would campaign on creating a "smarter" council structure, better housing, and improving the local economy.

Damon Harvey, a third-term incumbent councillor, also announced he would run for mayor; his second attempt. He said a priority was reducing cost to ratepayers. He said he was supported in his bid by Graeme Avery, Malcolm Dixon, Henare O’Keefe, Geraldine Travers, Ann Redstone, Luke Irving and Robyn McLean.

=== Māori wards referendum ===
The council had voted unanimously in August 2024 to keep Māori wards in the district. This triggered a referendum to be held alongside the 2025 local elections, per the conditions of legislation passed by the incumbent National government. Mayor Hazlehurst, who was pro-Māori wards, lamented the government's decision to require Māori wards. "We know our community and we should be trusted to make that decision", she said. In 2021, the council asked residents and 76% of responses came back in support of Māori wards.

A group called For Wards Hawke’s Bay formed to support the pro-ward position at the referendums in the wider Hawke's Bay region. The group held a meeting on 23 July in Clive chaired by regional council chair Rex Graham, with various speakers including local Presbyterian minister Jill McDonald, Māori ward councillor Heather Te Au-Skipworth, HB Multicultural Society president Rizwaana Latiff and Hayley Whittaker from the Public Service Association.

Hawke's Bay Today asked the mayoral candidates whether they supported the group; Harvey said he supported any group that wanted to get the community engaged on important issues, Schollum said she supported Māori wards, Buddo said he was personally voting no on Māori wards but supported the group existing, Gibson said he didn't support Māori wards because they are undemocratic, and Wilson said he would support whatever the outcome of the referendum was.

=== Debates and forums ===
Hastings Grey Power hosted a meet-the-candidates meeting on 7 August in Duart House in Havelock North. It held a second event on 5 September at the Baptist Church Hall in Hastings.

The Hawke's Bay Chamber of Commerce held a mayoral forum on 28 August at Hastings Boy's High School in Hastings. All five mayoral candidates confirmed they would attend.

== List of candidates ==
=== Incumbents not seeking re-election ===
- Ana Apatu, incumbent councillor for the Takitimu Māori ward since 2022
- Sandra Hazlehurst, mayor since 2017 and councillor since 2010.
- Tania Kerr, incumbent deputy mayor and councillor since 2008
- Malcolm Dixon, councillor since 2013

=== Mayor ===
Candidate	Photo	Affiliation (Note: A candidate may leave their affiliation blank, run as an independent, or run with an affiliation to an organisation, local body ticket or political party. Hastings District Council does not allow whānau, hapū, or iwi details to be used for the affiliation.)	Notes
Marcus Buddo		None	Councillor for the Kahurānaki ward since 2022
Steve Gibson		Keeping rate rises to inflation (CPI)	Former Manawatū District councillor from 2007 to 2013. Also ran for councillor in the Hastings-Havelock North general ward.
Damon Harvey		Accountable to You	Incumbent councillor since 2016, also ran in 2019.
Wendy Schollum		Proven Leadership – Fresh Thinking	Incumbent councillor since 2017
Darrin Wilson		None	Local businessman. Also ran for councillor in the Hastings-Havelock North general ward.

=== Council ===
==== Takitimu Māori ward ====
Takitimu Māori ward returned three councillors to the district council.

Candidate	Photo	Affiliation	Notes
Siiam Daniel		None	
Sarah Greening		None	Previously ran for council in 2022
Kellie Jessup		None	Incumbent councillor since 2022
Bevan O’Connor		Independent	Lawyer and owner of VisaMax NZ
Heather Te Au-Skipworth		None	Incumbent councillor since 2024

==== Flaxmere general ward ====
Flaxmere general ward returned one councillor to the district council.

Candidate	Photo	Affiliation	Notes
Henry Heke		None	Incumbent councillor since 2022
Henare O'Keefe		None	Former councillor

==== Hastings/Havelock North general ward ====
Hastings/Havelock North general ward returned seven councillors to the district council.

Candidate	Photo	Affiliation	Notes
Sayeed Ahmed		None	Previously ran for council in 2022
John Bennett		None	
Michael Fowler		Independent	Incumbent councillor since 2022
Gareth (Gus) Freeman		Keep rate rises to inflation (cpi)	
Steve Gibson		Keeping rate rises to inflation (CPI)	Former Manawatū District councillor from 2007 to 2013. Also ran for mayor.
Bernard Hickey		Independent	
Rizwaana (Riz) Latiff		Independent	Previously ran for council in 2019 and 2022
Yvonne Lorkin		Your Eyes, Ears and Energy in Council	
Lucie-Jane McElwee		Fair rate rises = inflation rate	
Simon J H Nixon		Independent	Incumbent councillor since 2010
Nick Ratcliffe		None	Green Party endorsed. Green candidate for Tukituki in the 2023 general election.
Rion Roben		None	Previously ran for council in 2022
Callum Ross		Independent	
Jacqueline Supra		None (CARE for Hastings)	
Debbie Ward		Listen. Learn. Advocate.	
Kevin Watkins		None	Incumbent councillor since 2001
Darrin Wilson		None	Also ran for mayor

==== Heretaunga general ward ====
Heretaunga general ward returned two councillors to the district council.

Candidate	Affiliation	Notes
Alwyn Corban	None	Incumbent councillor since 2019
Hana Montaperto-Hendry	None	Incumbent councillor since 2024

As the number of candidates did not exceed the number of positions available, Corban and Montaperto-Hendry were elected unopposed.

==== Kahurānaki general ward ====
Kahurānaki general ward returned one councillor to the district council.

Candidate	Affiliation	Notes
Elisha Milmine	None	Former Hawke's Bay A&P Society general manager

As the only candidate, Milmine was elected as the councillor for the Kahurānaki general ward unopposed.

==== Mōhaka general ward ====
Mōhaka general ward returned one councillor to the district council.

Candidate	Affiliation	Notes
Pagen Goldstone	None	Farmer
Derek Nowell-Usticke	None (CARE for Hastings)	
Kirsty Scott-McLean	None	

==== Withdrawn candidates ====
- Zack Makoare, was initially listed among the confirmed candidates for the Kahurānaki general ward, but later withdrew his candidacy indicating that his circumstances had changed.

== Opinion polling ==
=== Mayor ===
Date	Polling organisation	Sample size	Buddo	Gibson	Harvey	Schollum	Wilson	Undecided
8 September	Curia	500	25%	9%	14%	12%	3%	28%

== Results ==
=== Mayor ===
Councillor Wendy Schollum won the mayoralty, with fellow councillor Marcus Buddo coming in second-place.

2025 Hastings mayoral election
Party	Candidate	Votes	%	±%
Independent	Wendy Schollum	7,212	26.95	(new)
Independent	Marcus Buddo	6,613	24.71	(new)
Independent	Steve Gibson	5,810	21.71	(new)
Independent	Damon Harvey	5,569	20.81	(new)
Independent	Darrin Wilson	1,107	4.14	(new)
Informal votes		42	0.16	n/a
Blank votes		406	1.52	n/a
Turnout		26,759	45.84	n/a
Registered electors		58,377		
Independent gain from Independent				

=== Mōhaka general ward ===
2025 Mōhaka general ward election
Party	Candidate	Votes	%	±%
CARE for Hastings	Derek Nowell-Usticke	713	37.55	(new)
Independent	Pagen Goldstone	610	32.12	(new)
Independent	Kirsty Scott-McLean	518	27.28	(new)
Informal votes		2	0.11	n/a
Blank votes		56	2.95	n/a
Turnout		1,899	47.79	n/a
Registered electors		3,974		
CARE for Hastings gain from Independent				

=== Heretaunga general ward ===
2025 Heretaunga general ward election
Party	Candidate	Votes	%	±%
Independent	Alwyn Corban^{†}	elected unopposed		
Independent	Hana Montaperto-Hendry^{†}	elected unopposed		
Registered electors		7,294		
Independent hold				
Independent hold				
^{†} incumbent

=== Hastings-Havelock North general ward ===
2025 Hastings-Havelock North general ward election
Party	Candidate	Votes	%	±%
Independent	Steve Gibson	7,618	53.73	(new)
Independent	Michael Fowler^{†}	6,699	47.25	−9.54
Independent	Yvonne Lorkin	6,560	46.27	(new)
Independent	Kevin Watkins^{†}	6,025	42.50	−10.43
Independent	Callum Ross	5,384	37.98	(new)
Independent	Simon J H Nixon^{†}	4,627	32.64	−8.66
Independent Green	Nick Ratcliffe	4,550	32.09	(new)
Independent	Rizwaana (Riz) Latiff	4,534	31.98	+0.80
Independent	Gareth (Gus) Freeman	4,394	30.99	(new)
Independent	Lucie-Jane McElwee	4,120	29.06	(new)
CARE for Hastings	Jacqueline Supra	3,786	26.71	(new)
Independent	Darrin Wilson	3,579	25.25	(new)
Independent	Bernard Hickey	3,237	22.83	(new)
Independent	Rion Roben	2,909	20.52	−2.10
Independent	John Bennett	2,824	19.92	(new)
Independent	Debbie Ward	2,373	16.74	(new)
Independent	Sayeed Ahmed	2,083	14.69	−4.33
Informal votes		27	0.19	−0.02
Blank votes		224	1.58	+1.09
Turnout		14,177	47.37	+9.04
Registered electors		29,929		
Independent gain from Independent				
Independent hold				
Independent gain from Independent				
Independent hold				
Independent gain from Independent				
Independent hold				
Independent Green gain from Independent				
^{†} incumbent

=== Flaxmere general ward ===
2025 Flaxmere general ward election
Party	Candidate	Votes	%	±%
Independent	Henare O'Keefe	682	54.17	(new)
Independent	Henry Heke^{†}	544	43.21	+2.95
Informal votes		2	0.16	−0.59
Blank votes		31	2.46	+0.21
Turnout		1,259	30.93	+8.35
Registered electors		4,071		
Independent gain from Independent				
^{†} incumbent

=== Kahurānaki general ward ===
2025 Kahurānaki general ward election
Party	Candidate	Votes	%	±%
Independent	Elisha Milmine	elected unopposed		
Registered electors		3,902		
Independent gain from Independent				

=== Takitimu Māori ward ===
2025 Takitimu Māori ward election
Party	Candidate	Votes	%	±%
Independent	Heather Te Au-Skipworth^{†}	2,580	73.71	(new)
Independent	Kellie Jessup^{†}	1,882	53.77	+5.30
Independent	Siiam Daniel	1,182	33.77	(new)
Independent	Sarah Greening	1,161	33.17	+5.81
Independent	Bevan O'Connor	1,089	31.11	(new)
Informal votes		1	0.03	+0.03
Blank votes		40	1.14	+1.14
Turnout		3,500	38.01	+18.90
Registered electors		9,207		
Independent hold				
Independent hold				
Independent gain from Independent				
^{†} incumbent

=== Māori Ward Poll ===
Choice	Votes	%
I vote to keep the Māori ward	12,216	47.83
I vote to remove the Māori ward	13,327	52.17
Total	25,543	100.00
Valid votes	25,543	95.46
Invalid/blank votes	1,216	4.54
Total votes	26,759	100.00

== See also ==
- 2025 Napier City Council election
- 2025 Hawke's Bay Regional Council election
