= Hastings District Council =

Territorial authority for the Hastings District of New Zealand

Coordinates: 39.6453153°S 176.840366°E

Hastings District Council Te Kaunihera ā-Rohe o Heretaunga
- Coat of arms

- Brand logo

Type
- Type: Territorial authority of Hastings District
- Term limits: None

History
- Established: 1 November 1989, 37 years ago
- Preceded by: Hastings City Council; Havelock North Borough Council; Hawke's Bay County Council
- New session started: 17 October 2025

Leadership
- Mayor: Wendy Schollum, Ind; 17 October 2025
- Deputy: Michael Fowler, Ind since October 2025
- CEO: Bruce Allan (acting) c. 1 August 2026

Structure
- Seats: 16 (including mayor)
- Political groups: Independent (14); Independent Green (1); CARE for Hastings (1)
- Length of term: 3 years, renewable

Elections
- Voting system: First-past-the-post
- First election: 14 October 1989
- Last election: 11 October 2025
- Next election: 14 October 2028

Meeting place
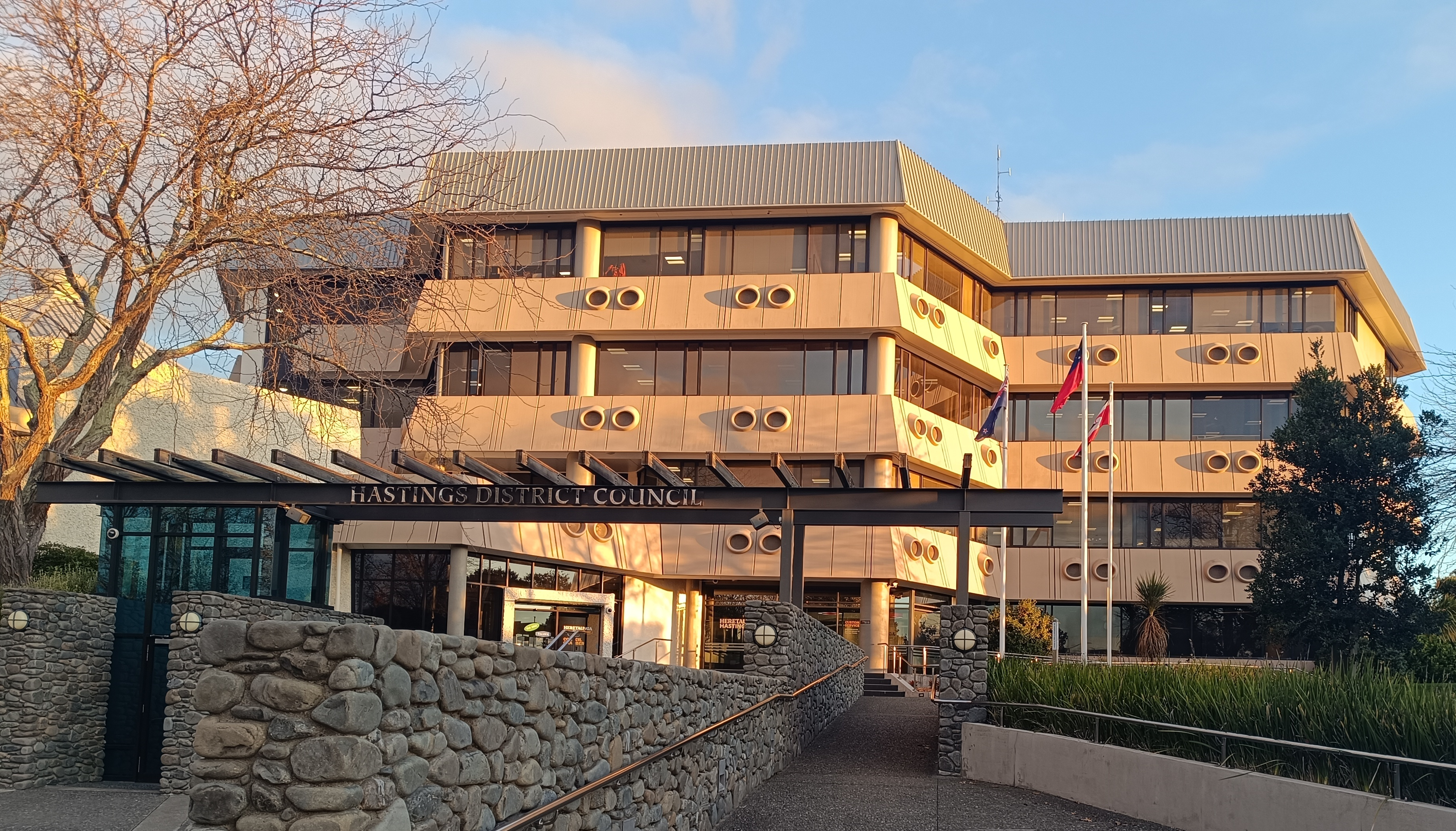
- Hastings District Council building

Website
- hastingsdc.govt.nz

Hastings District Council (abbr. HDC; Māori: Te Kaunihera ā-Rohe o Heretaunga) is the territorial authority for the Hastings District of New Zealand's North Island. It serves as the district's local government alongside the Hawke's Bay Regional Council as the regional council. It has existed since the 1989 reforms to local government.

The governing body of council has 14 councillors and is chaired by the mayor of Hastings (currently Wendy Schollum since October 2025). There is also a community board representing rural communities.

== History ==
=== 2022–2025 term ===
==== Cyclone Gabrielle recovery ====
In the 2024 budget, the government gave the council $1,470,000 towards road infrastructure affected by Cyclone Gabrielle. Mayor Hazlehurst welcomed the move.

Councils in Hawke's Bay established voluntary buyout schemes following the devastation of the cyclone, with 153 properties in the Hastings District deemed to be unsafe for continued human residence ("Category 3"). 24 of these were bought out right, with the owners of the rest of the land agreeing to receive relocation grants but retaining ownership. The costs for these buyouts was split evenly between council and the central government.

In the councils Long Term Plan, $17 million per year for 16 years was forecast to be put towards the cyclone recovery programme. Former Council CEO Nigel Bickle described the Long Term Plan as "...the most challenging..." the council had ever dealt with. Mayor Hazlehurst said in April 2024 that the council had spent in the past year "close to $155 million" in response to the cyclone.

== Governing body ==
=== Mayor ===
One mayor is elected at-large; they chair meetings of the governing body and act as the head of local government in the district.

=== Current composition ===
The current members of the governing body of council are:

Role	Portrait	Name	Affiliation	Ward
Mayor		Wendy Schollum	Independent	Elected at-large
Deputy		Michael Fowler	Independent	Hastings-Havelock North
Councillor		Steve Gibson	Independent	Hastings-Havelock North
Councillor		Yvonne Lorkin	Independent	Hastings-Havelock North
Councillor		Simon Nixon	Independent	Hastings-Havelock North
Councillor		Nick Ratcliffe	Independent Green	Hastings-Havelock North
Councillor		Callum Ross	Independent	Hastings-Havelock North
Councillor		Kevin Watkins	Independent	Hastings-Havelock North
Councillor		Derek Nowell-Usticke	CARE for Hastings	Mohaka
Councillor		Henare O'Keefe	Independent	Flaxmere
Councillor		Alwyn Corban	Independent	Heretaunga
Councillor		Hana Montaperto-Hendry	Independent	Heretaunga
Councillor		Elisha Milmine	Independent	Kahuranaki
Councillor		Siiam Daniel	Independent	Takitimu
Councillor		Kellie Jessup	Independent	Takitimu
Councillor		Heather Te Au-Skipworth	Independent	Takitimu

=== List of members by term ===
Term	Mayor	Councillors	Ref.
1989−1992	Jeremy Dwyer	Trevor Baker; Judith Baxter; Ralph Beamish; Selwyn Begley; Harvey Boyden; John Campbell; Terry Coxon; Mike Donnelly; David Law; John Paterson; David Pearse; Harry Romanes; Colin Shanley; Megan Willians	
1992−1995	Jeremy Dwyer		
1995−1998	Jeremy Dwyer		
1998−2001	Jeremy Dwyer		
2001−2004	Lawrence Yule	Chase Arguette; Judith Baxter; Cynthia Bowers; Derek Brownrigg; Mary Hannan; Dean Hyde; Richard Jones; Mick Lester; Keriana Poulain; Norman Speers; Tim Tinker; Deborah Turner; Margaret Twigg; Kevin Watkins; Dinah Williams	
2004−2007	Lawrence Yule	Chase Arquette; Cynthia Bowers; Derek Brownrigg; Rodney Heaps; Dean Hyde; Richard Jones; Mick Lester; David Pearse; Keriana Poulain; Norman Speers; Tim Tinker; Deborah Turner; Margaret Twigg; Kevin Watkins; Dinah Williams	
2007−2010	Lawrence Yule	Cynthia Bowers; Robert Burnside; Wayne Bradshaw; Derek Brownrigg; Rodney Heaps; Mandy Kimber; Mick Lester; Henare O'Keefe; Keriana Poulain; Norman Speers; Deborah Turner; Margaret Twigg; Kevin Watkins; Anne Wilson	
2010−2013	Lawrence Yule	Cynthia Bowers; Wayne Bradshaw; Ru Collin; Sandra Hazlehurst; Rodney Heaps; Scott Henderson; Tania Kerr; Mick Lester; Simon Nixon; Henare O'Keefe; Jacoby Poulain; John Roil; Margaret Twigg; Keving Watkins	
2013−2016	Lawrence Yule	Cynthia Bowers; Wayne Bradshaw; Malcolm Dixon; Sandra Hazlehurst; Rodney Heaps; Tania Kerr; Mick Lester; George Lyons; Simon Nixon; Henare O'Keefe; Adrienne Pierce; Jacoby Poulain; John Roil; Kevin Watkins	
2016−2019	Lawrence Yule	Bayden Barber; Malcolm Dixon; Damon Harvey; Sandra Hazlehurst^{R}; Rodney Heaps; Tania Kerr; George Lyons; Simon Nixon; Henare O'Keefe; Adrienne Pierce^{R}; Jacoby Poulain; Geraldine Travers; Ann Redstone; Kevin Watkins; Wendy Schollum^{by}; Eileen Lawson^{by}	
2016−2019	Sandra Hazlehurst	Bayden Barber; Malcolm Dixon; Damon Harvey; Sandra Hazlehurst^{R}; Rodney Heaps; Tania Kerr; George Lyons; Simon Nixon; Henare O'Keefe; Adrienne Pierce^{R}; Jacoby Poulain; Geraldine Travers; Ann Redstone; Kevin Watkins; Wendy Schollum^{by}; Eileen Lawson^{by}	
2019−2022	Sandra Hazlehurst	Bayden Barber; Alwyn Corban; Malcolm Dixon; Damon Harvey; Tania Kerr; Eileen Lawson; Simon Nixon; Henare O'Keefe; Peleti Oli (L); Wendy Schollum; Sophie Siers; Geraldine Travers; Ann Redstone; Kevin Watkins	
2022−2025	Sandra Hazlehurst	Ana Apatu; Marcus Buddo; Alwyn Corban; Malcolm Dixon; Michael Fowler; Damon Harvey; Henry Heke; Kellie Jessup; Tania Kerr; Eileen Lawson; Renate Nepe^{R}; Simon Nixon; Ann Redstone^{R}; Wendy Schollum; Kevin Watkins; Hana Montaperto-Hendry^{by}; Heather Te Au-Skipworth^{by}	
2025−2028	Wendy Schollum	Alwyn Corban; Silam Daniel; Michael Fowler; Steve Gibson; Kellie Jessup; Yvonne Lorkin; Elisha Milmine; Hana Montaperto-Hendry; Simon Nixon; Derek Nowell-Usticke (CARE); Henare O'Keefe; Nick Ratcliffe (IndG); Callum Ross; Heather Te Au-Skipworth; Kevin Watkins	
^{R} resigned during term; ^{by} elected at by-election

== Rural Community Board ==
The council also has a Rural Community Board, made up of four members elected from four rural community areas:

- Kaweka subdivision: Isabelle Crawshaw (Chair)
- Tutira subdivision: Abby Morley (Deputy chair)
- Maraekakaho subdivision: George Macmillan
- Poukawa subdivision: Pete Maclennan
- District councillors representing Mohaka, Kahuranaki, and Takitimu wards are also members.

== Chief executive ==
Chief executive of Hastings District Council
- Incumbent; Bruce Allan; Acting since c. 1 August 2026
- Formation: 1 November 2010; 16 years ago
- Website: hastingsdc.govt.nz

The professional head of the civil service is the chief executive, who is appointed by the council.

^{†} Died in office

No.	Chief executive	Portrait	Term start	Term end	Ref
1	?		1989	1991	
2	Eric Millar		1991	2000	
3	Murray Gilbertson		17 April 2000	31 December 2007	
–	Mike Maguire (acting)		1 January 2008	10 February 2008	
4	Ross McLeod		11 February 2008	20 June 2018	
–	Neil Taylor (acting)		21 June 2018	10 February 2019	
5	To'osavili Nigel Bickle		11 February 2019	1 August 2026^{[†]}	
–	Bruce Allan (acting)		c. 1 August 2026	incumbent	

== Elections ==
=== List ===
==== Council ====
- 1989
- 1992
- 1995
- 1998
- 2001
- 2004
- 2007
- 2010
- 2013
- 2016
- (2017)
- (2018)
- 2019
- 2022
- 2025

==== Mayoral ====
- 1989
- 1992
- 1995
- 1998
- 2001
- 2004
- 2007
- 2010
- 2013
- 2016
- (2017)
- 2019
- 2022
- 2025

== Wards ==
Current ward map (Takitimu Māori ward covers whole district)

=== Current wards ===
Currently the council has six wards; Mohaka and Kahuranaki wards cover northern and southern rural communities, respectively, the Heretaunga ward covers the non-urban surroundings of Hastings, the Flaxmere ward covers the suburb of Flaxmere, and the Hastings-Havelock North ward covers the urban areas of Hastings and Havelock North.

=== Māori wards ===
The council had introduced the Takitimu Māori ward at the 2022 local elections. Following the decision of the Sixth National Government to force local councils to either abolish Māori wards or hold a referendum on their continued existence, the council voted unanimously to retain them and thus to hold a referendum, to occur alongside the 2025 local elections. Deputy Mayor Kerr called the Government's decision a "farce", and Mayor Hazlehurst said it was "disheartening" that the Government did not trust local councils on the issue.

The result of the referendum held on 11 October 2025 was that the Māori ward will be abolished, with remove on 49.8% defeating keep on 45.7%.

== Youth council ==
The Hastings District Youth Council is made up of 15-20 young Hastonians aged 15 to 21 who live, work, or study in the district. In 2020, Hastings youth councillors were granted speaking rights on council subcommittees, allowing them to actively participate and provide input. This initiative aimed to empower youth by involving them in local governance and decision-making processes.

Vote on Youth Councillors having voting rights on committees
	For	Against	Absent
	Sandra Hazlehurst (mayor)	Alwyn Corban	Kellie Jessup
	Tania Kerr (DM)	Malcolm Dixon	Kevin Watkins
	Ana Apatu	Michael Fowler	
	Marcus Buddo	Damon Harvey	
	Hana Montaperto-Hendry	Henry Heke	
	Heather Te Au-Skipworth	Eileen Lawson	
	Wendy Schollum	Simon Nixon	
Total	7 (mayor tiebreak)	7	2

In September 2024, the Hastings District Council voted to grant youth councillors voting rights on subcommittees. The decision was evenly split among councillors, with Mayor Hazlehurst casting the tie-breaking vote in favour. She stated that this move provided "an opportunity for the next generation to influence change which will impact our community into the future."

The decision elicited mixed reactions; supporters viewed it as a progressive step towards youth empowerment and leadership development, whilst critics emphasised that youth councillors are unelected. The Taxpayers' Union protested the decision by setting up a "bouncy council" outside the Hastings District Council building.

Voting rights granted to youth councillors were limited to subcommittees and do not extend to full council meetings, ensuring that primary decision-making authority remains with elected councillors.

The Local Government Act permits councils to appoint unelected members to committees, a practice often used to involve subject matter experts or iwi representatives. The decision to grant voting rights to Youth Council members aligns with these existing provisions.

The decision was accompanied by "misinformation", according to one of the youth councillors. Certain elected members and advocacy groups, including the Taxpayers’ Union, claimed that the vote would allow youth councillors to vote in full council meetings, which was incorrect. The voting rights applied only to council subcommittees.

== Coat of arms ==
Coat of arms of Hastings District Council
Notes The council has a coat of arms, granted in 1993, which incorporates features from the coats of arms of the former Hastings City, Havelock North Borough and Hawke's Bay County councils. The blazon is: Crest On a wreath of the colours, clouds Argent, rays Or, a sunburst supporting a toothed wheel, perforated of six, centred and rimmed Argent, Gules. Escutcheon Per pale Vert and Argent, in dexter a cross-crosslet fitchy Or (for Havelock North Borough Council); in sinister, on a cross carved with a Māori pattern Gules, a sun in splendour Or (for Hawke's Bay County Council); on a chief party per pale Argent and Vert, a lion passant guardant, armed and langued Gules within an orle of fern leaves all counterchanged (for Hastings City Council). An inescutcheon Or charged with a manche Gules (for Warren Hastings). Supporters Dexter, a ram, tail couped, horned and hoofed Or, proper, supporting on a staff proper palewise flying to the dexter an ensign Sable, two bars Argent edged and charged with a hawk rising Or (for Hawke's Bay and Lord Hawke). Sinister, a bull, armed and hoofed Or, supporting a staff property palewise flying to the sinister, edged Or, a New Zealand Ensign; all supported by a profusion of apples, pears, peaches, grapes and miro berries with their leaves, surmounting a Māori style carved panel representing Rongomatane and Haumiatiketike, all proper. Motto Urbis Et Ruris Concordia (Town and Country in Harmony).
