= Results of the 1989 New Zealand territorial authority elections in Hawke's Bay =

Local elections in New Zealand

1989 New Zealand territorial authority elections (Hawke's Bay)
- 14 October 1989
- 4 of 4 local councils
Party	Councils	+/–
No majority	4	
This lists parties that won seats. See the complete results below.
- 4 mayors and 41 local councillors
Party	Seats	+/–
Mayors
Independent	4	
Local councillors
Independent	47	
This lists parties that won seats. See the complete results below.

Elections for the territorial authorities of New Zealand were held from September until 14 October 2025 as part of that year's nation-wide local elections. 1,003 local councillors and 73 mayors were elected across all 73 councils.

4 territorial authorities were located within the Hawke's Bay Region. 4 mayors and 45 district and city councillors were elected.

These were the first elections following the 1989 reforms to local government undertaken by the Fourth Labour Government; the previously existing local authorities in the region were abolished and new authorities were created in their place. The Hastings District Council and Central Hawke's Bay District Council were wholly new whilst the Napier City Council and Wairoa District Council continued with the same names and similar jurisdictions as prior existing authorities.

== Wairoa District Council ==
1989 Wairoa District Council election
- 14 October 1989
- Registered: 5,762
- Turnout: 3,745 (64.99%)
- Mayoral election
Candidate	Clifford Owen
Affiliation	Independent
Popular vote	Unopposed
Mayor before election
Clifford Owen
Elected mayor
Clifford Owen
- Council election
- 9 seats on the Wairoa District Council; 6 seats needed for a majority
Party	Seats	+/–
Independent	9	−6
This lists parties that won seats. See the complete results below.

=== 1989 Wairoa mayoral election ===
1989 Wairoa mayoral election
Affiliation	Candidate	Vote
Independent	Clifford Owen	Unopposed
Registered		5,762
Independent hold		

=== Mahia-Nuhaka ward ===
Mahia-Nuhaka ward
Affiliation	Candidate	Vote	%
Independent	Derek Fox	241	~45.13
Independent	Leslie Nicholas	178	~33.33
Independent	William Christy^{†}	115	~21.54
Informal		?	?
Turnout		>534	?
Registered		?	
Independent gain from Independent			
^{†} incumbent

=== Tuhara-Frasertown ward ===
Tuhara-Frasertown ward
Affiliation	Candidate	Vote	%
Independent	James Taylor	419	?
Independent	Wayne Lowe^{†}	273	?
Independent	Thomas Burton	207	?
Informal		?	?
Turnout		?	?
Registered		?	
Independent gain from Independent			
Independent hold			
^{†} incumbent

=== Wairoa ward ===
Wairoa ward
Affiliation	Candidate	Vote	%
Independent	Kenneth McEwen^{†}	1,356	?
Independent	George Bell^{†}	1,326	?
Independent	Muriel Cooper^{†}	1,325	?
Independent	Denys Caves^{†}	1,274	?
Independent	Gilbert Archibald^{†}	1,178	?
Informal		?	?
Turnout		?	?
Registered		?	
Independent hold			
Independent hold			
Independent hold			
Independent hold			
^{†} incumbent

=== Mohaka-Waiau ward ===
Mohaka-Waiau ward
Affiliation	Candidate	Vote
Independent	Leslie Probert^{†}	Unopposed
Registered		?
Independent hold		
^{†} incumbent

=== Waikaremoana-Ruakituri ward ===
Waikaremoana-Ruakituri ward
Affiliation	Candidate	Vote
Independent	Alan Stuart^{†}	Unopposed
Registered		?
Independent hold		
^{†} incumbent

== Hastings District Council ==
1989 Hastings District Council election
- 14 October 1989
- Registered: 40,258
- Turnout: 22,767 (56.55%)
- Mayoral election
Candidate	Jeremy Dwyer	James Fargo
Affiliation	Independent	Independent
Popular vote	19,677	2,334
Percentage	86.43%	10.25%
Elected mayor
Jeremy Dwyer
- Council election
- 14 seats on the Hastings District Council; 8 seats needed for a majority
Party	Seats	+/–
Independent	14	+14
This lists parties that won seats. See the complete results below.

=== 1989 Hastings mayoral election ===
1989 Hastings mayoral election
Affiliation	Candidate	Vote	%
Independent	Jeremy Dwyer	19,677	86.43
Independent	James Fargo	2,334	10.25
Informal		756	3.32
Turnout		22,767	(56.55)
Registered		40,258	
Independent win (new council)			

=== Hastings ward ===
Hastings ward
Affiliation	Candidate	Vote	%
Independent	Megan Williams	1,764	?
Independent	Terry Coxon	1,471	?
Independent	Garry Mulvanah	961	?
Independent	Maxina Davidson	822	?
Independent	Graham Ellery	758	?
Independent	Colin McLanachan	609	?
Independent	Penelope Shuker	589	?
Independent	Laurence Ward	363	?
Independent	Robert Love	321	?
Independent	Christopher Sullivan	256	?
Informal		?	?
Turnout		?	?
Registered		?	
Independent win (new council)			
Independent win (new council)			

=== Havelock North ward ===
Havelock North ward
Affiliation	Candidate	Vote	%
Independent	Harry Romanes	3,804	?
Independent	Colin Shanley	2,297	?
Independent	Ewing Robertson	1,325	?
Independent	Peter Morrison	1,121	?
Independent	Valerie McKay	1,034	?
Informal		?	?
Turnout		?	?
Registered		?	
Independent win (new council)			
Independent win (new council)			

=== Flaxmere ward ===
Flaxmere ward
Affiliation	Candidate	Vote	%
Independent	Judith Baxter	1,531	?
Independent	David Pearse	1,354	?
Independent	Jim Judd	868	?
Independent	David Tucker	493	?
Informal		?	?
Turnout		?	?
Registered		?	
Independent win (new council)			
Independent win (new council)			

=== Twyford ward ===
Twyford ward
Affiliation	Candidate	Vote	%
Independent	Selwyn Begley	1,732	?
Independent	Mike Donnelly	1,500	?
Independent	Alan Grant	1,365	?
Independent	Christopher Lindstrom	917	?
Independent	Edward Hill	768	?
Independent	Tony Wilson	756	?
Informal		?	?
Turnout		?	?
Registered		?	
Independent win (new council)			
Independent win (new council)			

=== Clive ward ===
Clive ward
Affiliation	Candidate	Vote	%
Independent	David Law	1,672	?
Independent	Trevor Baker	1,598	?
Independent	Charlie Trask	1,528	?
Independent	Maurice Menneer	1,205	?
Independent	Garth Tichborne	903	?
Independent	Brian Phillips	832	?
Informal		?	?
Turnout		?	?
Registered		?	
Independent win (new council)			
Independent win (new council)			

=== Kaweka ward ===
Kaweka ward
Affiliation	Candidate	Vote	%
Independent	John Paterson	886	?
Independent	Ralph Beamish	791	?
Independent	Ronald Dawson	546	?
Independent	Albert Gray	437	?
Informal		?	?
Turnout		?	?
Registered		?	
Independent win (new council)			
Independent win (new council)			

=== Maraekakaho ward ===
Maraekakaho ward
Affiliation	Candidate	Vote	%
Independent	John Campbell	631	?
Independent	Harvey Boyden	541	?
Independent	Bryan Kettle	432	?
Independent	John Campbell	234	?
Independent	Gail Jackson	233	?
Independent	Peter Reo	197	?
Informal		?	?
Turnout		?	?
Registered		?	
Independent win (new council)			
Independent win (new council)			

== Napier City Council ==
1989 Napier City Council election
- 14 October 1989
- Turnout: >20,147
- Mayoral election
Candidate	Alan Dick	Harry Lawson	Sheila Belshaw
Affiliation	Independent	Independent	Independent
Popular vote	9,150	4,254	2,530
Percentage	~45.42%	~21.11%	~12.56%
Candidate	Kerry Single	Ashley Church
Affiliation	Independent	Independent
Popular vote	1,697	1,629
Percentage	~8.42%	~8.09%
Mayor before election
Dave Prebensen
Elected mayor
Alan Dick
- Council election
- 12 seats on the Napier City Council; 7 seats needed for a majority
Party	Seats	+/–
Independent	12	0
This lists parties that won seats. See the complete results below.

=== 1989 Napier mayoral election ===
1989 Napier mayoral election
Affiliation	Candidate	Vote	%
Independent	Alan Dick	9,150	~45.42
Independent	Harry Lawson	4,254	~21.11
Independent	Sheila Belshaw	2,530	~12.56
Independent	Kerry Single	1,697	~8.42
Independent	Ashley Church	1,629	~8.09
Independent	Alan Paine	887	~4.40
Informal		?	?
Turnout		>20,147	?
Registered		?	
Independent gain from Independent			

=== Ahuriri ward ===
Ahuriri ward
Affiliation	Candidate	Vote	%
Independent	Anne Tolley^{†}	3,888	?
Independent	Harry Lawson^{†}	3,795	?
Independent	Tony Brownlie	2,807	?
Independent	Sheila Belshaw^{†}	2,487	?
Independent	Michael Kalaugher	2,168	?
Independent	Graeme Robertson	2,107	?
Independent	Ron Massey	1,444	?
Independent	Neville Baker	1,408	?
Informal		?	?
Turnout		?	?
Registered		?	
Independent hold			
Independent hold			
Independent gain from Independent			
Independent hold			
^{†} incumbent

=== Onekawa ward ===
Onekawa ward
Affiliation	Candidate	Vote	%
Independent	Denyse Watkins	3,135	?
Independent	Ian Dick	3,046	?
Independent	Newton Angove^{†}	2,776	?
Independent	Russell Spiller^{†}	2,643	?
Independent	Alan Paine	1,998	?
Independent	Heitia Hiha	1,897	?
Independent	Arthur Paxie	1,661	?
Independent	Ted Gillespie	1,411	?
Independent	Brian Small	1,373	?
Independent	Hana Coster	1,148	?
Independent	Dan Wakefield	693	?
Informal		?	?
Turnout		?	?
Registered		?	
Independent gain from Independent			
Independent gain from Independent			
Independent hold			
Independent hold			
^{†} incumbent

=== Taradale ward ===
Taradale ward
Affiliation	Candidate	Vote	%
Independent	Ashley Church	3,767	?
Independent	Anne Stuart	3,426	?
Independent	Simon Thomas	3,069	?
Independent	Arthur Spence	2,845	?
Independent	Trevor Stewart	2,751	?
Independent	Barrie O'Brien	2,417	?
Independent	Dick Brunton	2,177	?
Independent	Kevin Crawley	2,125	?
Independent	Jack Halka	2,101	?
Independent	Peter McAleer	978	?
Informal		?	?
Turnout		?	?
Registered		?	
Independent gain from Independent			
Independent gain from Independent			
Independent gain from Independent			
Independent gain from Independent			
^{†} incumbent

== Central Hawke's Bay District Council ==
1989 Central Hawke's Bay District Council election
- 14 October 1989
- Turnout: >5,825
- Mayoral election
Candidate	Hugh Hamilton	James Fargo
Affiliation	Independent	Independent
Popular vote	3,237	2,588
Percentage	~55.57%	~44.43%
Elected mayor
Hugh Hamilton
- Council election
- 12 seats on the Central Hawke's Bay District Council; 7 seats needed for a majority
Party	Seats	+/–
Independent	12	+12
This lists parties that won seats. See the complete results below.

=== 1989 Central Hawke's Bay mayoral election ===
1989 Central Hawke's Bay mayoral election
Affiliation	Candidate	Vote	%
Independent	Hugh Hamilton	3,237	~55.57
Independent	James Fargo	2,588	~44.43
Informal		?	?
Turnout		>5,825	?
Registered		?	
Independent win (new council)			

=== Aramoana ward ===
Aramoana ward
Affiliation	Candidate	Vote	%
Independent	Catherine Soppet	520	?
Independent	Mark Williams	472	?
Independent	Brian Davidson	443	?
Informal		?	?
Turnout		?	?
Registered		?	
Independent win (new council)			
Independent win (new council)			

=== Takapau ward ===
Takapau ward
Affiliation	Candidate	Vote	%
Independent	Hamish Kynoch	497	?
Independent	Antonius Gruiters	359	?
Independent	Aileen Davies	343	?
Independent	Francis Von Dadelszen	304	?
Independent	Murray Durham	167	?
Informal		?	?
Turnout		?	?
Registered		?	
Independent win (new council)			
Independent win (new council)			

=== Tikokino ward ===
Tikokino ward
Affiliation	Candidate	Vote	%
Independent	David Marsh	715	?
Independent	Brian Gibbs	682	?
Independent	Timothy Plummer	376	?
Informal		?	?
Turnout		?	?
Registered		?	
Independent win (new council)			
Independent win (new council)			

=== Waipawa ward ===
Waipawa ward
Affiliation	Candidate	Vote	%
Independent	Walter Scott	648	?
Independent	George Stephenson	599	?
Independent	Terence Story	328	?
Independent	Bavel Peacock	243	?
Independent	Janice Havward	187	?
Informal		?	?
Turnout		?	?
Registered		?	
Independent win (new council)			
Independent win (new council)			

=== Waipukurau ward ===
Waipukurau ward
Affiliation	Candidate	Vote	%
Independent	Diana Marriott	1,529	?
Independent	John Hands	1,404	?
Independent	Marie King	1,105	?
Independent	James Shand	1,074	?
Independent	Russell St Hill Warren	1,052	?
Independent	John Graham	828	?
Independent	Mary Fieldsend	800	?
Independent	William Heke	466	?
Informal		?	?
Turnout		?	?
Registered		?	
Independent win (new council)			
Independent win (new council)			
Independent win (new council)			
Independent win (new council)			

== See also ==
- 1989 Hawke's Bay Regional Council election
