= Ed Bate =

New Zealand politician

Sir Edwin Bate OBE OStJ

Mayor of Hastings
- In office 1953–1959
- Preceded by: R.D. Brown
- Succeeded by: Ron Giorgi

Personal details
- Born: Walter Edwin Bate; 12 March 1901 Greenmeadows, New Zealand
- Died: 12 September 1999 (aged 98)
- Spouse: Annie Louise Jordan (m. 1925; died 1988)
- Children: 3
- Education: Victoria University College
- Profession: Barrister, solicitor and notary public

Sir Walter Edwin Bate OBE OStJ (12 March 1901 – 12 September 1999) was a New Zealand politician. He served as mayor of Hastings from 1953 to 1959.

== Early life and family ==
Born in Greenmeadows on 12 March 1901, Bate was the son of Peter Bate and Florence Eleanor Bate (née Broadley). He was educated at Napier Boys' High School, and went on to study law at Victoria University College, graduating LLM with first-class honours in 1923.

In 1925, Bate married Annie Louise Jordan, and the couple went on to have three children.

== Legal career ==
Bate worked as a barrister, solicitor and notary public, first in Taumarunui from 1923 to 1926, and then in Hastings until retiring in 1980.

== Local government ==
From 1941 to 1974, Bate served as chairman of the Hawke's Bay Hospital Board, and between 1954 and 1975 he was president of the Hospital Boards Association of New Zealand. He was elected mayor of Hastings in 1953, and remained in that role until 1959.

== Other activities ==
Bate was the first president of the Hawke's Bay Trustee Savings Bank. A Freemason, Bate served as grand master of the Grand Lodge of New Zealand from 1972 to 1974.

== Death ==
Bate died on 12 September 1999, and was buried in Havelock North Cemetery. He had been predeceased by his wife, Louise, in 1988.

== Honours and awards ==
In 1953, Bate was awarded the Queen Elizabeth II Coronation Medal. In the 1955 Queen's Birthday Honours, he was appointed an Officer of the Order of the British Empire, for services to local government. In 1960, he was made an Officer of the Order of St John. Bate was appointed a Knight Bachelor, for services to local government and the community, in the 1969 New Year Honours.
