= Algie Rainbow =

New Zealand accountant (1885–1969)

Algernon Instone (Algie) Rainbow OBE (1885–1969) was a New Zealand accountant, company director and local politician. He was born in Hastings, New Zealand, in 1885. He was Mayor of Hastings from 1941 to 1947.

In the 1946 New Year Honours, Rainbow was appointed an Officer of the Order of the British Empire in recognition of his services as chairman of the Provincial Patriotic Zone Committee, Hastings.
