= Mayor of Hastings, New Zealand =

Head of the municipal government of Hastings

Mayor of Hastings
- Te Koromatua o Heretaunga
- Coat of arms of Hastings

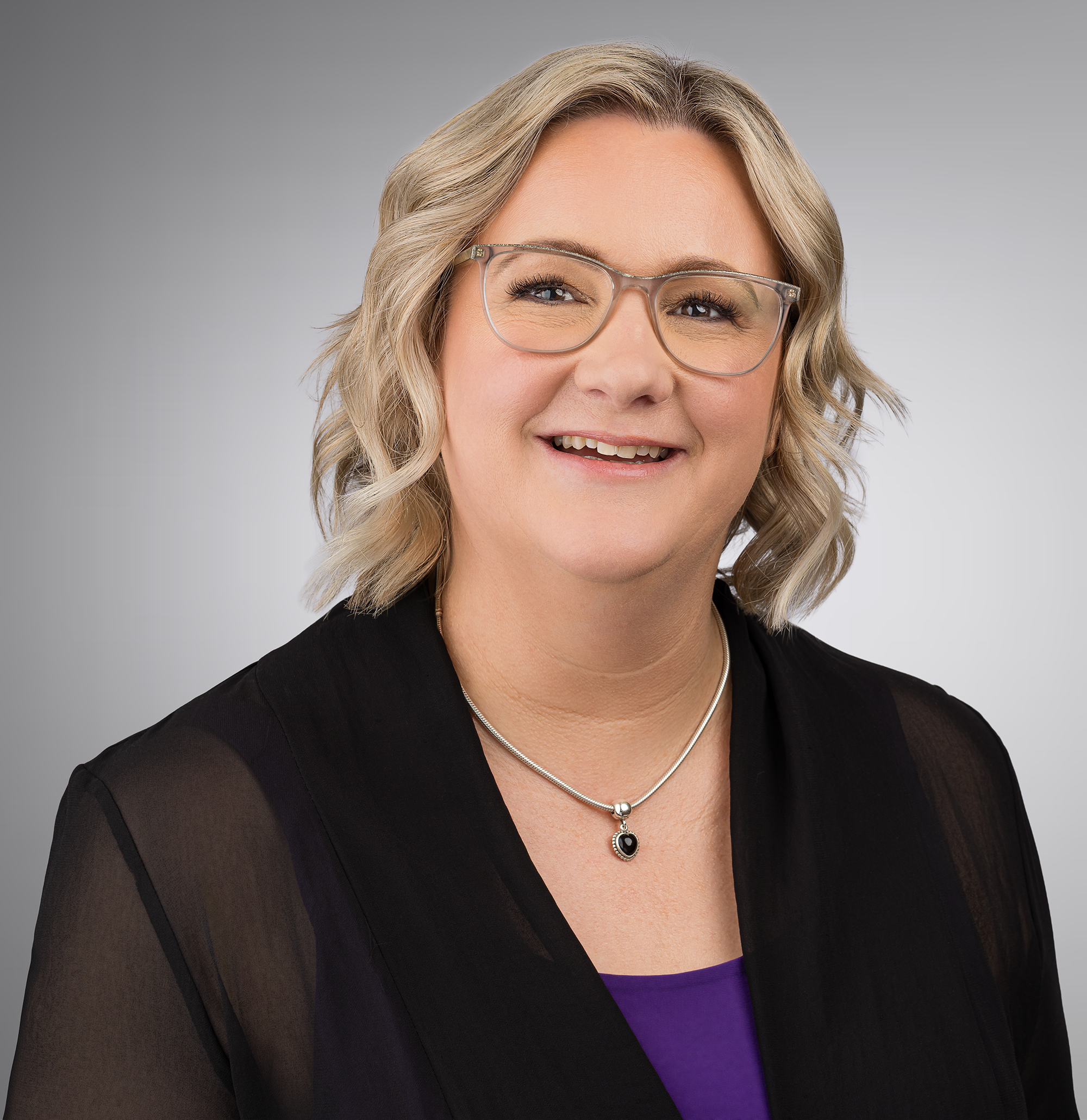
- Incumbent; Wendy Schollum since 17 October 2025
- Style: His/Her Worship
- Seat: Hastings
- Term length: 3 years, renewable
- Formation: 1886; 140 years ago
- First holder: Robert Wellwood
- Deputy: Michael Fowler
- Salary: $160,955
- Website: Official website

The mayor of Hastings is the elected head of local government in the Hastings District of New Zealand's North Island; one of 67 mayors in the country. The principal town of the district (and its namesake) is Hastings. The mayor presides over the Hastings District Council and is directly elected using the first-past-the-post method.

The first mayor was Robert Wellwood, and the current mayor is Wendy Schollum, first elected in the 2025 election.

== List of mayors ==
No.	Affiliation	Mayor	Portrait	Term
1	Independent	Robert Wellwood (1836–1927)		1886–1887
2	Independent	George Ellis (1837–1928)		1887–1890
3	Independent	William Fletcher Burnett (1848–1893)		1890–1891
(2)	Independent	George Ellis (1837–1928)		1891–1894
4	Independent	Cecil Fitzroy (1844–1917)		1894–1899
5	Independent	William Dennett (1845–1928)		1899–1904
6	Independent	William Lane		1904–1905
(5)	Independent	William Dennett (1845–1928)		1905–1906
7	Independent	Thomas Thompson (1855–1938)		1906–1909
8	Independent	John Miller (1869–1940)		1909–1911
9	Independent	James Garnett (1856–1913)		1911–1913 (Note: Died May 1913)
10	Independent	William Hart (1863–1939)		1913–1917
11	Independent	Horace Simson (1874–1954)		1917–1919
12	Independent	George Ebbett (1872–1954)		1919–1921
(10)	Independent	William Hart (1863–1939)		1921–1922 (Note: Resigned in 1922 due to poor health.)
13	Independent	George Maddison (1887–1949)		1922–1929
14	Independent	George Roach (1866–1934)		1929
–	Position vacant (November 1929) (Note: Mayor George Roach was briefly suspended from the mayoralty for breaching the Municipal Corporations Act 1928. During this time, there was no mayor, and the deputy mayor, Robert Henderson, carried out the duties of the mayoral office. Roach was reinstalled as mayor less than a month later after being re-elected without opposition.)			
(14)	Independent	George Roach (1866–1934)		1929–1933 (Note: The 1931 elections were not held in Napier and Hastings due to the 1931 Hawke's Bay earthquake.)
(13)	Independent	George Maddison (1887–1949)		1933–1941
15	Citizens	Algernon Rainbow (1885–1969)		1941–1947
16	Citizens	Robert Douglas Brown (1901–1963)		1947–1953
17		Ed Bate (1901–1999)		1953–1959
18		Ron Giorgi (1907–1997)		1959–1974
19		Jim O'Connor (1936–2000)		1974–1986
20	Independent	Jeremy Dwyer (1947–2005)		1986–2001
21	Independent	Lawrence Yule (b. 1963)		2001–2017
22	Independent	Sandra Hazlehurst (b. 1959)		2017–2025
23	Independent	Wendy Schollum		2025–present

== List of deputy mayors ==
^{†} Died in office

Name	Term	Mayor
J. Nelson Williams	October–November 1894	Fitzroy
W. Beilby	September–December 1899	Fitzroy
George Ellis	January–February 1907	Thompson
A. A. George	fl.1908	Thompson
W. H. Smith	1909–c. 1910	Miller
Thomas Styles	c. 1910–1921	Miller
Thomas Styles	c. 1910–1921	Miller?
Thomas Styles	c. 1910–1921	Garnett
Thomas Styles	c. 1910–1921	Hart
Thomas Styles	c. 1910–1921	Simson
Thomas Styles	c. 1910–1921	Ebbett
D. E. Davis	1921–1922	Hart
George Maddison	1922	Hart
T. Clarkson	1922–1923	Maddison
F. W. Cook	1923–1925	Maddison
Matthew Johnson	1925–1927^{[†]}	Maddison
S. J. McKee (acting) (Note: Johnson passed his deputy-mayoral duties to McKee due to a bout of illness. McKee was to act until Johnson was fit enough to return. Johnson did not formally return to the position and died in 1929.)	1927–1929	Maddison
Robert Henderson	1929–1933	Roach
Robert Henderson	1929–1933	Vacant
Robert Henderson	1929–1933	Roach
Algernon Rainbow	1933–1941	Maddison
S. Ashcroft	1941–1946	Rainbow
S. Ashcroft	1941–1946	Brown
Alexander Kirkpatrick	1946–1962	Brown
Alexander Kirkpatrick	1946–1962	Bate
Alexander Kirkpatrick	1946–1962	Giorgi
J. K. Agnew	fl.1962–1968	Giorgi
Unknown	c. 1968–c. 1971	Giorgi
E. J. Velvin	fl.1971	Giorgi
Unknown	c. 1971–c. 1974	Giorgi
J. C. Mackersey	fl.1974	Connor
Unknown	c. 1974–1989	–
Selwyn John Begley	1989–1992	Dwyer
Unknown	1992–c. 1994	Dwyer
Harry Romanes	fl.1994	Dwyer
Unknown	c. 1994–2001	Dwyer
Cynthia Bowers	2001–2016	Yule
Sandra Hazlehurst	2016–2017	Yule
Simon Nixon (acting)	2017	Hazlehurst (acting)
Tania Kerr	2017–2025	Hazlehurst
Michael Fowler	2025–present	Schollum

== Elections ==
=== Hastings Borough Council ===
==== Annual ====
- 1886
- 1887
- 1888
- 1889
- 1890
- 1891
- 1892
- 1893
- 1894
- 1895
- 1896
- 1897
- 1898
- 1899
- 1900
- 1901
- 1902
- 1903
- 1904
- 1905
- 1906
- 1907

==== Biennial ====
- 1909
- 1911
- 1913
- 1915
- 1917
- 1919
- 1921
- 1923
- 1925
- 1927
- 1929
- ~~1931~~ (Note: Election cancelled due to 1931 Hawke's Bay earthquake)
- 1933
- 1935

==== Triennial ====
- 1938
- 1941
- 1944
- 1947
- 1950
- 1953

=== Hastings City Council ===
- 1956
- 1959
- 1962
- 1965
- 1968
- 1971
- 1974
- 1977
- 1980
- 1983
- 1986

=== Hastings District Council ===
- 1989
- 1992
- 1995
- 1998
- 2001
- 2004
- 2007
- 2010
- 2013
- 2016
- (2017)
- 2019
- 2022
- 2025
