= Robert Wellwood =

Farmer, auctioneer, commission agent, mayor (1836–1927)

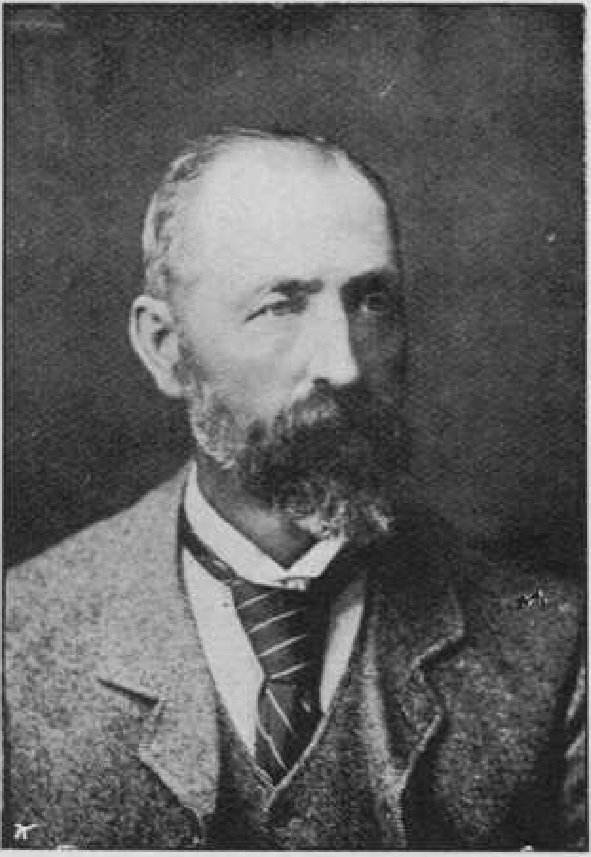
- Wellwood in 1906

1st Mayor of Hastings
- In office 1886–1887
- Succeeded by: George Ellis

Personal details
- Born: c. 21 May 1836 County Kilkenny, Ireland
- Died: 26 January 1927 (aged 90) Hastings, New Zealand
- Resting place: Hastings cemetery 39.6327°S 176.8253°E
- Spouse(s): Annie Wellwood (née Heslop) m. 1872 d. 1881; Jane Wellwood (née Ling) m. 1883
- Children: 10

Robert Wellwood (c. 21 May 1836 – 26 January 1927) was a New Zealand farmer, auctioneer, commission agent and mayor. He was born in County Kilkenny, Ireland in 1836.

He was elected unopposed as the first mayor of Hastings on 29 September 1886 and served until 21 December 1887 when he resigned and the council elected George Ellis as his successor.

== Biography ==
=== Early life ===
Wellwood was born May 1836 in County Kilkenny to Ambrose Wellwood and Ann Proctor, in a time when Ireland was still united with Great Britain. Wellwood emigrated to the colony of New Zealand aboard the Queen of Avon, arriving in Wellington in July 1959.

Before settling in Hastings permanently, Wellwood swagged around New Zealand. He had visited the town at one point and according to him "bagged a buggy load of wild ducks". Returning briefly to work for J N Williams, he then went off to participate in the Otago gold rush. He came back after his fortunes weren't favoured and managed land around Frimley, there on purchasing his Waikoko homestead to farm the surrounding land.

=== Auctioneering ===
Wellwood sold off his lands to William Nelson and set up an auctioneering business. His saleyards were described as "unrivalled in the North Island" by local historian Mary Boyd, consisting of 24 yards capable of holding thousands of animals. Wellwood hoped to one day sell the saleyards to a company, saying "Life was made up of speculation". He later opened a wholesale warehouse and put on a large fancy dress ball to celebrate.

=== Early councils ===
Before being established as a town borough in 1884, the Hastings area was governed by the Hawke's Bay County Council and the Heretaunga Road Board. Wellwood served on the road board, whose main responsibilities were building roads and bridges to connect the district.

=== Borough council ===
On 2 January 1884, Hastings was proclaimed a town district by the Governor, having met the requirements of over 500 population and 50 householders with a population around 617. The new town board would have five elected commissioners, with candidates competing for votes at a public meeting, Wellwood amongst them. A debate on whether Wellwood, Russell or Tanner could claim the title of "Father of Hastings" ensued. The first councillors would be Russell, Tanner, C Doney, T Foreman, and F D Luckie - excluding Wellwood. At the next election, Wellwood would replace Russell when the latter was elected to parliament, with J N Williams and future mayor George Ellis replacing Luckie and Doney.
