= Ashley Church =

New Zealand politician

Ashley Cameron Church (born 26 February 1964) is a New Zealand business executive, commentator and former politician.

== Political career ==
In 1987, Church stood as the National Party candidate for the parliamentary electorate of Napier, but was defeated by a margin of more than five thousand votes.

In 1989, he became the youngest person elected to Napier City Council. During his time on the council, he attracted both strong support and strong opposition for his views. He was responsible for the ‘NapierLife’ Marketing program. He lost his Council seat in 1998 after serving three terms.

== Community activities ==
Church's community activity has included roles such as national council member of New Zealand Jaycees, executive councillor of the North Shore Chamber of Commerce, national board member of Towns & Cities New Zealand, creator and organiser of the Hawke's Bay Summer Festival, and organiser of the 1985 North Shore Telethon Centre. He has been a director of the Hawke's Bay Airport, Marineland of New Zealand and the National Aquarium of New Zealand.

== Work history ==
Church was chief executive officer of the Auckland Property Investors Association from 2005 to 2007. He was the national sales manager for Mercury Energy, then Sales and Marketing Manager of Pulse Energy from 2009. He was general manager of the Newmarket Business Association from 2010 to 2014, then the CEO of the Property Institute of New Zealand from 2015. He was the chairperson of the New Zealand Taxpayers' Union for five months in 2021. Currently he is a director of the Israel Institute of New Zealand.

He is employed by NZME as a correspondent, is a commentator on energy and business issues, and has appeared on My House My Castle, NZ Open Home, ASB I Want to Buy a Home and TVNZ Breakfast.
