= 2017 Hastings District Council by-election =

- 24 November 2017
- Registered: ~55,803
- Turnout: 22,098 (39.60%)
- Mayoral election
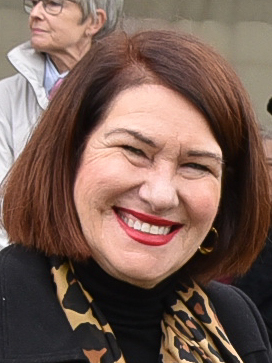

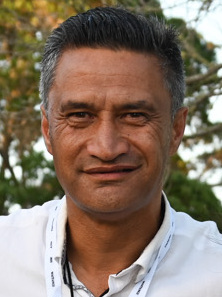
| Candidate | Sandra Hazlehurst | Bayden Barber |
| Party | Independent | Independent |
| Popular vote | 10,154 | 5,252 |
| Percentage | 45.95% | 23.77% |
| Candidate | Simon Nixon | Stuart Perry |
| Party | Independent | Independent |
| Popular vote | 2,977 | 2,977 |
| Percentage | 13.47% | 12.05% |
Mayor before election
Lawrence Yule
Independent
Elected mayor
Sandra Hazlehurst
Independent
- Councillor election
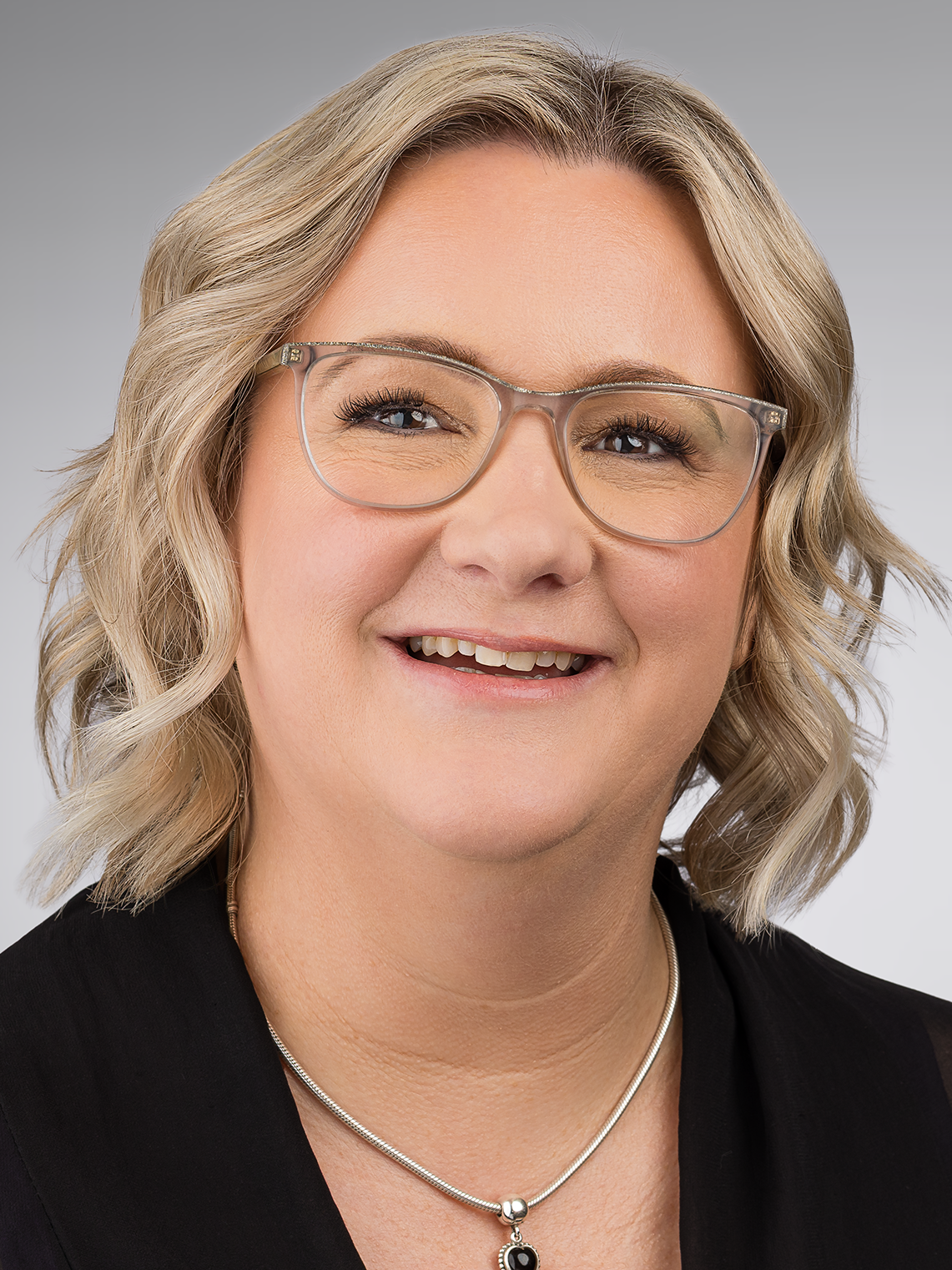

| Candidate | Wendy Schollum | Eileen Lawson | Bruce Bisset |
| Party | Independent | Independent | Independent |
| Popular vote | 3,338 | 3,021 | 2,154 |
| Percentage | 24.68% | 22.33% | 15.92% |
| Candidate | Rizwanna Latiff | Jason Whaitiri | Waitawhara Tupaea |
| Party | Independent | Independent | Independent |
| Popular vote | 1,962 | 1,403 | 823 |
| Percentage | 14.50% | 10.37% | 6.08% |
Councillor before election
Adrienne Pierce
Independent
Elected Councillor
Wendy Schollum
Independent

The 2017 Hastings District Council by-election was held to elect a new mayor for the Hastings District of New Zealand following the election of incumbent mayor Lawrence Yule as MP for Tukituki, and to elect a new councillor in the Hastings-Havelock North ward as well.

The election took place on 24 November and the winner served until after the 2019 election. The result of the election was a victory for Sandra Hazlehurst, the district's first female mayor.

== Background ==
Following the announcement in December 2016 by Craig Foss that he wouldn't stand for re-election as the National Party candidate for Tukituki, long-serving incumbent mayor Lawrence Yule put his name forward for the role. He said he would stand down from the role of mayor after dealing with the Havelock North gastroenteritis outbreak. Yule went on unpaid leave of absence from 30 June and then resigned on 30 August.

== Campaign ==
Issues brought up by candidates included the gastroenteritis outbreak, the local economy (including the district's agricultural industry), management of water (including water chlorination), and housing. The relationship with other councils in the region was also an issue following strained relations related to the proposed amalgamation of councils in Hawke's Bay.

Barber, Hazlehurst, and Nixon were in favour of continued chlorination while it was necessary to maintain the quality of the district's water. Perry and Tosh were against chlorination. Barber, Hazlehurst, and Perry were against the Water Conservation Order which put restrictions on water use from the Ngaruroro River. Nixon was against it but said he'd listen to both sides of the issue. Tosh said he supported the WCO but understood the concerns of those against it. Tupaea said he had to speak to the community before making a decision on either issue.

Nixon wanted better air services, and also expressed concern over the lack of any tertiary education campuses within the district. Tosh was concerned with the amount of debt the council had.

== Candidates ==
=== Declared ===
- Bayden Barber – district councillor since 2016.
- Sandra Hazlehurst – district councillor since 2010, acting mayor.
- Simon Nixon – district councillor since 2011, acting deputy mayor.
- Stuart Perry – former council employee.
- Allister David Tosh – unsuccessful 2017 Tukituki candidate for his Future Youth Party.
- Waitawhara Tupaea – 19-year-old.

== Results ==
=== Mayor ===
The election saw Hazlehurst win with 45.99% of the vote, beating second place Barber with a margin of 4,902. Hazlehurst became the city and district's first female mayor. Councillor Tania Kerr was elected by the council as deputy mayor, making it the first time both mayor and deputy mayor were women.

2017 Hastings mayoral by-election
| Party | Candidate | Votes | % | ±% |
|---|---|---|---|---|
| Independent | Sandra Hazlehurst | 10,154 | 45.95 | |
| Independent | Bayden Barber | 5,252 | 23.77 | |
| Independent | Simon Nixon | 2,977 | 13.47 | |
| Independent | Stuart Perry | 2,662 | 12.05 | |
| Independent | Waitawhara Tupaea | 661 | 2.99 | |
| Independent | Alister Tosh | 325 | 1.47 | |
| Informal votes | | 12 | 0.05 | |
| Blank votes | | 55 | 0.25 | |
| Turnout | | 22,098 | 39.60 | |
| Registered electors | | ~55,803 | | |
| Independent gain from Independent | | | | |

=== Hastings-Havelock North ward ===
2017 Hastings District Council by-election – Hastings-Havelock North ward
| Party | Candidate | Votes | % | ±% |
|---|---|---|---|---|
| Independent | Wendy Schollum | 3,338 | 24.68 | |
| Independent | Eileen Lawson | 3,021 | 22.33 | |
| Independent | Bruce Bisset | 2,154 | 15.92 | |
| Independent | Rizwanna Latiff | 1,962 | 14.50 | |
| Independent | Jason Whaitiri | 1,403 | 10.37 | |
| Independent | Waitawhara Tupaea | 823 | 6.08 | |
| Independent | Rion Roben | 472 | 3.49 | |
| Informal votes | | 15 | 0.11 | |
| Blank votes | | 339 | 2.51 | |
| Turnout | | 13,527 | | |
| Registered electors | | | | |
| Independent gain from Independent | | | | |
