= 2022 Hastings District Council election =

Elections in New Zealand

- 8 October 2022
- Turnout: 15,616 (33.72% ▼10.62 pp)
- Mayor
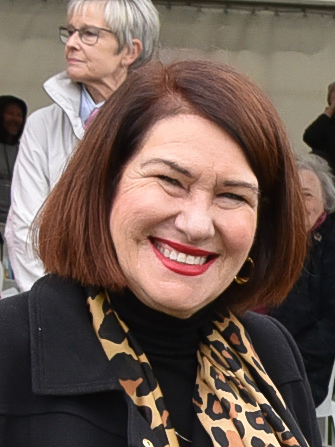
Candidate	Sandra Hazlehurst
Party	Independent
Popular vote	Unopposed
Mayor before election
Sandra Hazlehurst
Independent
Elected mayor
Sandra Hazlehurst
Independent
- Councillors
- 15 seats on the governing body of Hastings District Council; 8 seats needed for a majority
Party	Seats	+/–
Independent	15	+2
This lists parties that won seats. See the complete results below.
Control before	Control after
No majority	No majority

The 2022 Hastings District Council election was a local election held from 15 September to 8 October in the Hastings District of New Zealand as part of that year's nation-wide local elections. Voters elected the mayor of Hastings and 15 district councillors for the 2022–2025 term of the Hastings District Council. Postal voting and the first-past-the-post voting system were used.

== Key dates ==
Key dates relating to the local election were as follows:

15 July	Candidate nominations opened
12 August	Candidate nominations closed and electoral roll closed
17 August	Candidates announced
16–18 September	Voting papers sent out
16 September–8 October	Voting opened
8 October	Election day - voting closed at noon. Preliminary results released
13 October	Official results released

== Background ==
=== Representation ===
Following the representation review, the suburb of Flaxmere lost one of its two council seats. Some residents of the suburb were not happy about this; one resident told Hawke's Bay Today that "I think Flaxmere is actually growing, so it should probably be more".

== Campaign ==
=== Unopposed contests ===
Many wards, particularly those in rural areas, saw their elections uncontested as the number of candidates was equal to the number of vacancies. One resident of rural Hastings told Hawke's Bay Today that it was a "shame", referring to the mayoral race, regional council race, and district council races in his area all being uncontested.

=== Flaxmere general ward ===
One resident of Flaxmere told Hawke's Bay Today said that it was "nice to see" Pasifika and Māori candidates standing for the ward.

=== Hastings-Havelock North general ward ===
==== Incumbents ====
Incumbent councillors Malcolm Dixon, Damon Harvey, Eileen Lawson, and Simon Nixon ran for re-election.

Dixon pointed to his 4 decades in education and his involvement with various community interest boards and trusts as a reason voters should elect him. Dixon said he was running to give back to the community. He listed the diversity and vibrancy of the ward as a reason he thought it was special. His most important issues was people struggling in the community, including the homeless. He said the council should open up land to increase housing, though not at the cost of the Heretaunga Plains but rather densification. He said that councils should put pressure on central government to help create pathways for youth that end up on the dole.

Harvey told the New Zealand Herald that people should vote for him because of his connections to the community that he's developed over 20 years of working in the city as a businessman and through running his business magazine. He said he had lived in both Flaxmere and Havelock North, and that he loved how diverse the city had become. He said a key issue was balancing the tension between housing people and avoiding encroaching on the fertile plains that surround the city; he supported building apartments. He said that the food industry and the youth of the district were important to invest into.

Lawson said she was a "really experienced" councillor and that people should vote for her because she could think "strategically" and "practically". She was running again because she had more work to do, saying that the city was improving and that she was excited about that. She said that looking after the environment whilst managing economic growth was an important issue and that working on youth employment and education was important for the region's industry. Ensuring good housing in the district was important for her and working on opportunities and education for the youth of the district was her top priority.

Nixon said people should vote for him because he had trained as an economist and had had "quite" senior jobs at several large companies. He had been an orchardist and a local business owner as well, so he had a breadth of experience in his view. He was running again because he thought he could make a "real" difference. He said that the ward was special because it "dominates" the district and the wider Hawke's Bay region in terms of population and commercial activity. He pointed to Three Waters as a big issue because he thought it would cost the council a lot. He said he was not "totally convinced" about the climate issue but that the council should do something; public transport needed to be improved as part of this (though public transport is a regional council issue). Rates increases were a big issue for him.

==== Other candidates ====
Other candidates included Rizwaana Latiff, Gilly Lawrence, and Rion Roben.

Latiff was a nurse, midwife, and community volunteer who moved to New Zealand in 2000 from South Africa; she also ran in 2019 where she placed 9th. She lived in Mahora and praised the ward for its diversity in terms of ethnicity and age. She said the biggest issues facing the ward were housing and climate change. She said she had experience working with the council and central government.

Lawrence was a photography and film lighting specialist, the chairperson of the Eastern Screen Alliance. He said he was not very special, that he was not a politician, and that people should vote for him to bring a different voice. He grew up in Waimārama but had moved to Auckland for work; he later moved back to Hawke's Bay 18 years prior to the election. He said he was running because it was new to him and it was out of his comfort zone and that it was exciting and challenging to learn all about interacting with the community. He said creating opportunities for young people was the ward's biggest issue, along with safe and affordable housing. Ensuring water safety was important for him as well as the cost of living.

Roben, who liked playing board games, was running to bring a different voice to the council, one representative of working families rather than business. He had run in a previous election but did not win. He praised the economic growth and diversity of the ward and was concerned most about water issues, saying he supported some of the proposals of the Three Waters reforms but had concerns around the roll out. He said he wanted to improve the nightlife in the city, and that cost of living was a key issue. He supported funds going towards artists local to the region and he wanted to improve parks in the district.

==== Vaccinations ====
Harvey, Lawson, and Roben said they had been vaccinated against COVID-19 and were pro-vaccine. Gilly Lawrence said he had been vaccinated but that he was pro-choice on the issue.

==== Māori wards ====
Dixon was in favour of Māori wards.

== Results ==
=== Mayor ===
2022 Hastings mayoral election
Party	Candidate	Votes	%	±%
Independent	Sandra Hazelhurst^{†}	elected unopposed		
Registered electors		58,037		
Independent hold				
^{†} incumbent

=== Mōhaka general ward ===
2022 Mōhaka general ward election
Party	Candidate	Votes	%	±%
Independent	Tania Kerr^{†}	elected unopposed		
Registered electors		4,103		
Independent hold				
^{†} incumbent

=== Heretaunga general ward ===
2022 Heretaunga general ward election
Party	Candidate	Votes	%	±%
Independent	Alwyn Corban^{†}	elected unopposed		
Independent	Ann Redstone^{†}	elected unopposed		
Registered electors		7,624		
Independent hold				
Independent hold				
^{†} incumbent

=== Hastings-Havelock North general ward ===
2022 Hastings-Havelock North general ward election
Party	Candidate	Votes	%	±%
Independent	Eileen Lawson^{†}	7,135	62.05	+0.32
Independent	Wendy Schollum^{†}	7,027	61.11	+12.31
Independent	Malcolm Dixon^{†}	6,530	56.79	+2.37
Independent	Michael Fowler	6,508	56.60	(new)
Independent	Kevin Watkins^{†}	6,086	52.93	−0.23
Independent	Damon Harvey^{†}	5,234	45.52	−13.78
Independent	Simon J H Nixon^{†}	4,749	41.30	−2.32
Independent	Rizwaana (Riz) Latiff	3,585	31.18	−5.81
Independent	Melanie Lorraine Petrowski	3,221	28.01	(new)
Independent	Gilly Lawrence	2,614	22.73	(new)
Independent	Rion Roben	2,601	22.62	+0.80
Independent	Alex Cameron	2,422	21.06	(new)
Independent	Sayeed Ahmed	2,187	19.02	−7.21
Independent	Kim Priest	2,149	18.69	(new)
Informal votes		24	0.21	+0.11
Blank votes		56	0.49	−1.33
Turnout		11,498	38.33	−6.59
Registered electors		29,999		
Independent hold				
Independent hold				
Independent hold				
Independent gain from Independent				
Independent hold				
Independent hold				
Independent hold				
^{†} incumbent

=== Flaxmere general ward ===
2022 Flaxmere general ward election
Party	Candidate	Votes	%	±%
Independent	Henry Heke	376	40.26	(new)
Independent	Michael Ngahuka	279	29.87	(new)
Independent	Marcelle Raheke	156	16.70	(new)
Independent	Victoria Fuata'i	85	9.10	(new)
Informal votes		7	0.75	+0.51
Blank votes		21	2.25	+1.33
Turnout		934	22.58	−9.64
Registered electors		4,136		
Independent gain from Labour				

=== Kahurānaki general ward ===
2022 Kahurānaki general ward election
Party	Candidate	Votes	%	±%
Independent	Marcus Buddo	882	55.72	(new)
Independent	John Roil	687	43.40	(new)
Informal votes		0	0.00	n/a
Blank votes		14	0.88	n/a
Turnout		1,583	41.70	n/a
Registered electors		3,796		
Independent gain from Independent				

=== Takitimu Māori ward ===
2022 Takitimu Māori ward election
Party	Candidate	Votes	%	±%
Independent	Ana Apatu	963	60.15	(new)
Independent	Kellie Jessup	776	48.47	(new)
Independent	Renata Nepe	666	41.60	(new)
Independent	Dallas Rahui Te Ahuru Adams	549	34.29	(new)
Independent	Sarah Greening-Smith	438	27.36	(new)
Independent	Kiri Goodspeed	388	24.23	(new)
Independent	Hohepa Cooper	318	19.86	(new)
Informal votes		0	0.00	n/a
Blank votes		0	0.00	n/a
Turnout		1,601	19.11	n/a
Registered electors		8,379		
Independent win (new seat)				
Independent win (new seat)				
Independent win (new seat)				

== Aftermath ==
The new council and rural community board were sworn in on 3 November at Waipatu Marae. Mayor Hazlehurst told those gathered at the marae that "we are incredibly proud and excited about the coming term and carrying on our hard mahi". She welcomed the new Māori ward councillors to their first term and announced that Mōhaka ward councillor Tania Kerr would be deputy mayor. Nigel Bickle, chief executive of Hastings District Council, then congratulated all of the councillors.

The inaugural meeting of the council was also held then, and afterwards the inaugural meeting of the rural community board also occurred, with Jonathan Stockley and Isabelle Crawshaw appointed as board chair and deputy chair, respectively. Tania Kerr, Marcus Buddo, and Ana Apatu were appointed to the board as the council's representatives.

== See also ==
- 2022 Napier City Council election
