= Jeremy Dwyer =

Former mayor of Hastings, New Zealand (1947–2005)

20th Mayor of Hastings
- In office 1986–2001
- Preceded by: Jim O'Connor
- Succeeded by: Lawrence Yule

Personal details
- Born: 3 December 1947 Waipawa
- Died: 11 December 2005 (aged 58) Hastings
- Party: Social Credit

Jeremy Paul Dwyer QSO JP (3 December 1947 – 11 December 2005) was a New Zealand politician. He was deputy leader of the Social Credit Political League between 1977 and 1981, and Mayor of Hastings from 1986 to 2001.

== Early life ==
Dwyer was born in Waipawa on 3 December 1947, the son of Sam and Lillian Dwyer, and educated at Central Hawke's Bay College. He studied at Ardmore Teachers' Training College, gaining a Diploma of Teaching in 1969 and TTC in 1971.

In 1983, Dwyer married Marilyn Eva McKay, and the couple had one son.

== Teaching career ==
Dwyer was a teacher and head of department of history and social studies at Te Aute College from 1972 to 1976. He was a member of the board of governors of Te Aute College from 1976 until 1989, including a term as chair of the board between 1979 and 1981.

== Political career ==
=== Social Credit ===
Dwyer was an activist in the Social Credit Political League, and was deputy leader of the League from 1977 to 1981. He stood as a parliamentary candidate for the League three times, coming third each time: at the 1972 election for Gisborne (receiving 654 votes); and at the 1975 and 1978 general elections for Hastings (1,788 and 5,373 votes respectively). He resigned as deputy leader and as the candidate for Hastings in July 1981.

=== Hastings ===
Dwyer served as a Hastings city councillor from 1977 to 1981. In 1986, he was elected as mayor of Hastings City, and then as mayor of Hastings District following the 1989 local government reforms. In 2001, after 15 years as mayor, he chose not to seek re-election.

== Honours and awards ==
In 1990, Dwyer was awarded the New Zealand 1990 Commemoration Medal. In the 1999 New Year Honours, he was appointed a Companion of the Queen's Service Order for public services.

== Death ==
Dwyer died on 11 December 2005 from melanoma, from which he had suffered for over a year.

Political offices
Preceded by Jim O’Connor	Mayor of Hastings; 1986–2001	Succeeded by Lawrence Yule
Party political offices
Preceded by Les Hunter	Deputy Leader of the Social Credit Party; 1977–1981	Succeeded by Gary Knapp
