= Sandra Hazlehurst =

New Zealand politician (born 1959)

Sandra Hazlehurst ONZM
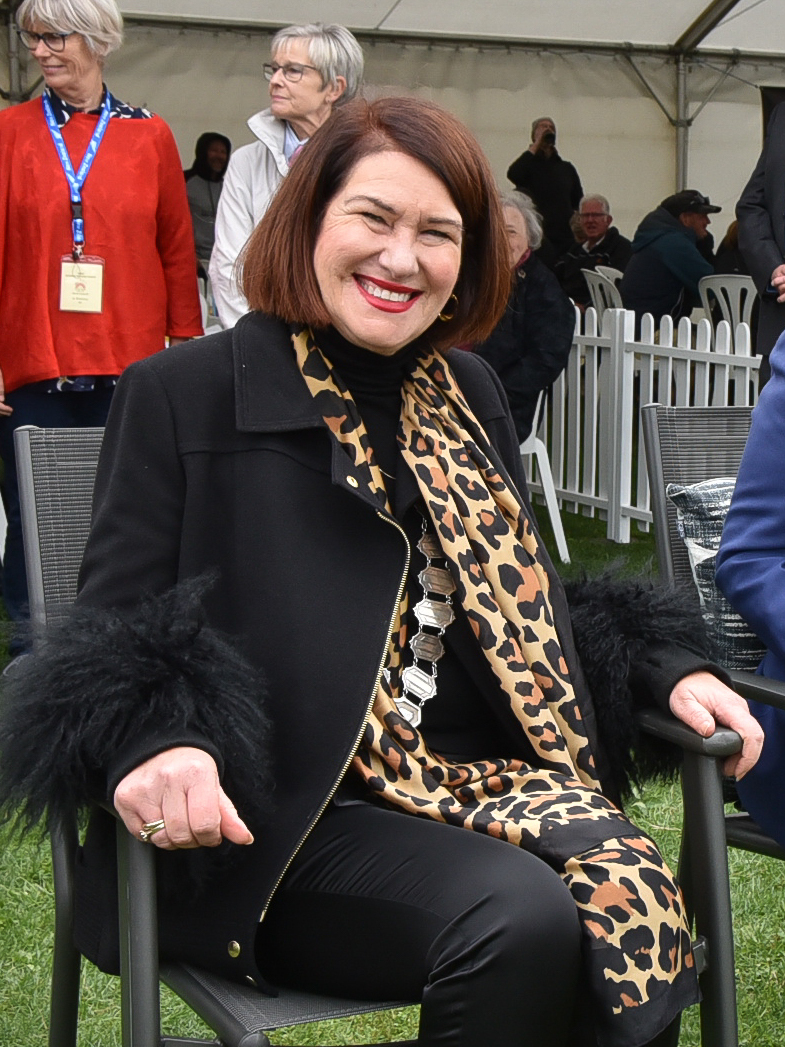
- Hazlehurst in 2023

22nd Mayor of Hastings
- In office 24 November 2017 – 17 October 2025
- Preceded by: Lawrence Yule
- Succeeded by: Wendy Schollum

Personal details
- Born: Sandra Glenis Brannigan; 1959 (age 66–67) Hastings, New Zealand
- Spouse: Mark Hazlehurst (m. 1984)
- Children: 2
- Education: Hastings Girls' High School

Sandra Glenis Hazlehurst ONZM (née Brannigan; born 1959) is a New Zealand politician. She served as the mayor of Hastings from November 2017 until October 2025, and was the first woman to hold the position.

== Early life and family ==
Hazlehurst was born in Hastings in 1959, the daughter of Velma Ada Brannigan (née Warren) and John Brannigan, a carpenter and later baker. She was educated at Ebbett Park School, Heretaunga Intermediate, and Hastings Girls' High School. Growing up, she was actively involved in Girlguiding, and in 1977 she earned the Queen's Guide award.

After her overseas experience, Brannigan returned to New Zealand in 1983, and married Mark Hazlehurst the following year. The couple went on to have two daughters.

In 1986, Hazlehurst and her sister bought a fruit and vegetable shop in central Hastings. She later established Central Building Surveyors with her husband.

== Political career ==
Before being elected to the Hastings District Council in 2010, Hazlehurst served as the chair of the Hastings City Business Association for four years. She was elected mayor on 24 November 2017, following the 2017 by-election held after her predecessor, Lawrence Yule, resigned to contest the Tukituki electorate at the 2017 general election. She became the first female mayor of the district.

Hazlehurst served as the mayor of Hastings during the recovery period following Cyclone Gabrielle, where she played a role in overseeing infrastructure rebuilding efforts and addressing housing concerns, including buy-outs.

Under Hazlehurst's council, the Hastings District saw a 77% decline in the number of people in emergency housing between March 2022 and September 2023.

A public disagreement surfaced between Hazlehurst and senior councillor Damon Harvey in late 2023, after Harvey acknowledged the existence of a document related to the council's handling of consenting issues. As a result, Harvey was later removed from his committee chair position by Hazlehurst.

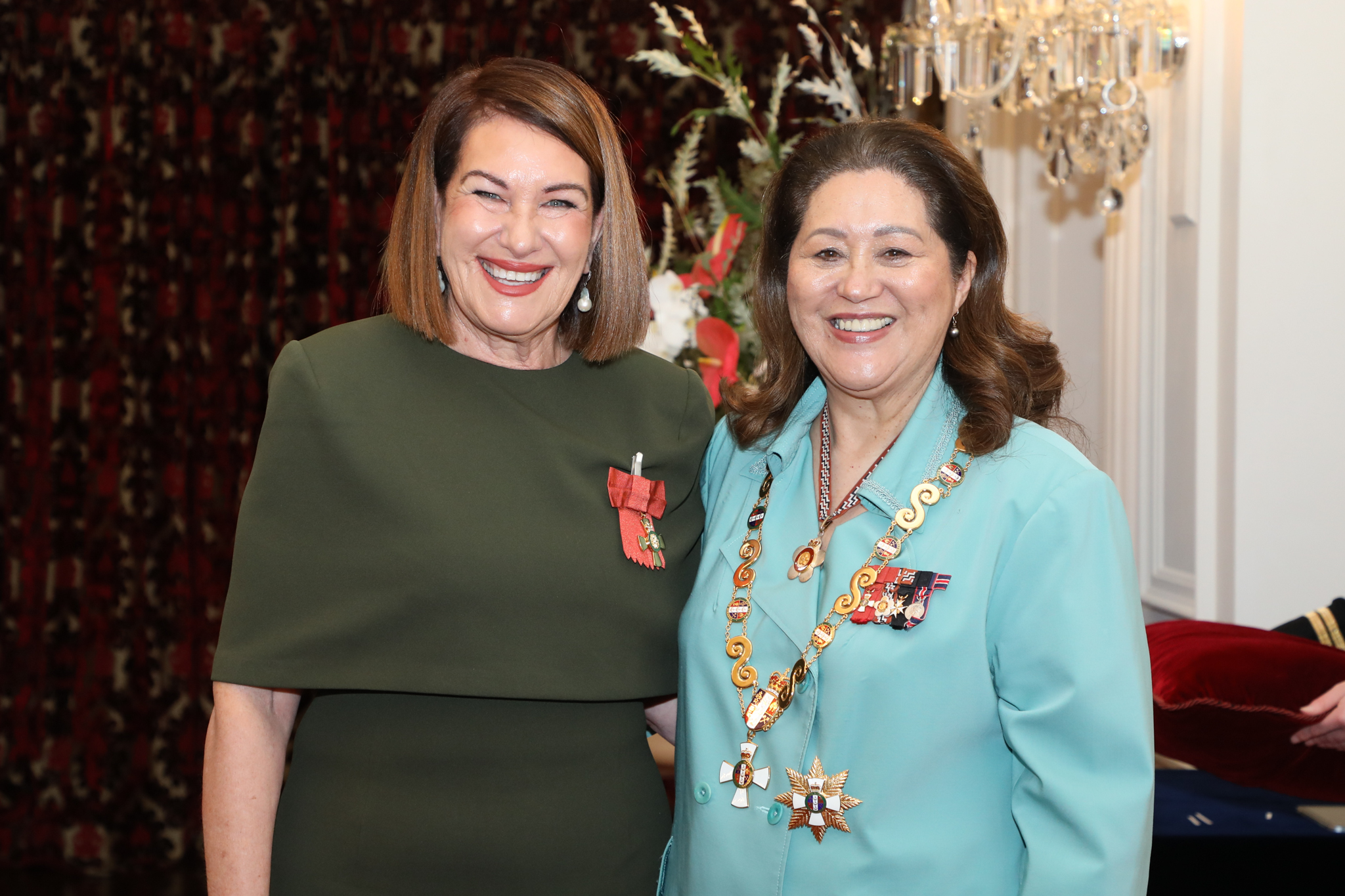
Hazlehurst (left), after her investiture as an Officer of the New Zealand Order of Merit by the governor-general, Dame Cindy Kiro, at Government House, Wellington, on 22 May 2026

In the 2026 New Year Honours, Hazlehurst was appointed an Officer of the New Zealand Order of Merit, for services to local government.

Political offices
| Preceded by Lawrence Yule | Mayor of Hastings; 2017–2025 | Succeeded by Wendy Schollum |
