= Maraekākaho River =

River in New Zealand

- Route of the Maraekākaho River
- Mouth of the Maraekākaho River Maraekākaho River (North Island)
- Native name: Maraekākaho (Māori)

Location
- Country: New Zealand
- Island: North Island
- Region: Hawke's Bay
- District: Hastings

Physical characteristics
- Source
  - coordinates: 39.78658°S 176.55935°E
- Mouth: Ngaruroro River
  - location: Maraekākaho
  - coordinates: 39°38′41″S 176°37′34″E
- Length: 24.3 km (15.1 mi)
- Basin size: 122.4 km^{2} (47.3 sq mi)

Basin features
- Progression: Maraekākaho River → Ngaruroro River → Hawke Bay → Pacific Ocean
- Tributaries
  - left: Wye Stream, Gala Water, Ettrick Stream, Yarrow Stream
- Bridges: Ben Lomond Bridge, Maraekakaho Bridge

The Maraekākaho River is a river of the Hawke's Bay region, New Zealand. It flows into the Ngaruroro River.

== Etymology ==
The river's name means "abundance of flax plumes" in Māori, a name shared by the community found at the mouth of the river, Maraekākaho.

== Geography ==
The Maraekākaho River rises in the Raukawa area of the Hawke's Bay Region, following a meandering course through farmland. It flows into the Ngaruroro River immediately north of the rural village of Maraekākaho. The catchment of the Maraekākaho River is primarily farmland used to raise sheep and cattle, with native forest only covering 3% of the catchment area. Geologically, the river flows over greywacke formed between the Holocene and Pleistocene, originally deposited by the Ngaruroro River.

== History ==
The river has traditional significance to Ngāti Kahungunu, including the hapū Ngāti Te Upokoiri and Ngāti Te Rangikoianake.
