= Ngaruroro River =

River in the Hawke's Bay Region, New Zealand

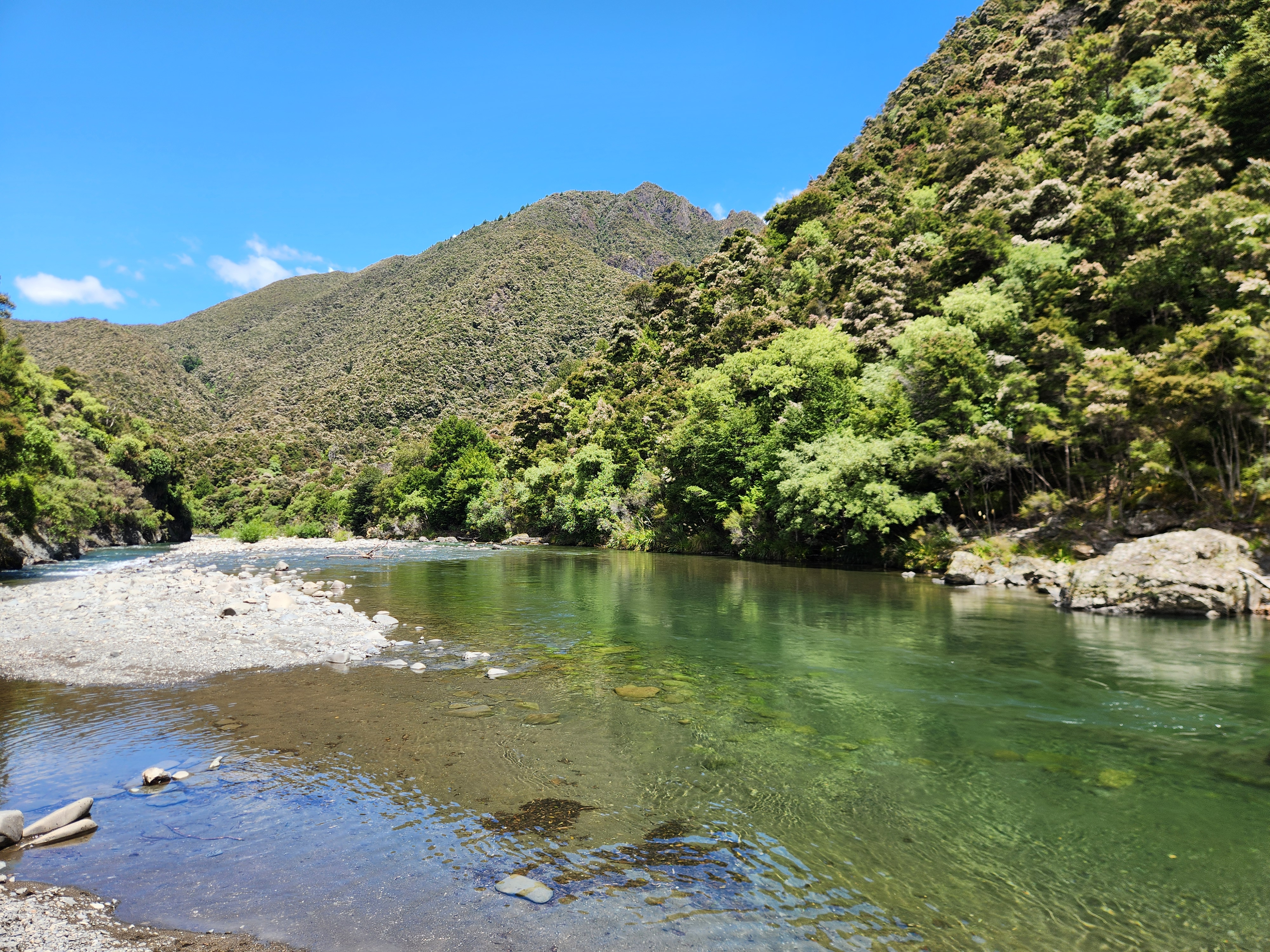
- Ngaruroro River at Kuripapango the Kaweka Range
- Route of the Ngaruroro River
- Mouth of the Ngaruroro River Ngaruroro River (North Island)
- Native name: Ngaruroro Moko-tū-ā-raro ki Rangatira, Nga-ngaru-o-nga-upokororo-mai-i-mokotuararo-ki-Rangatira

Location
- Country: New Zealand
- Island: North Island
- Region: Hawke's Bay
- District: Hastings, Taupō, Rangitikei

Physical characteristics
- Source: Confluence of Mangamingi Stream and Te Waiotupuritia Stream
  - location: Kaimanawa Range
  - coordinates: 39.1341°S 176.14661°E
- Mouth: Hawke Bay
  - location: Waitangi Estuary
  - coordinates: 39°34′10″S 176°55′45″E
  - elevation: 0 m (0 ft)
- Length: 164 km (102 mi)
- Basin size: 2,500 km^{2} (970 sq mi)

Basin features
- Progression: Ngaruroro River → Hawke Bay → Pacific Ocean
- Cities: Maraekākaho, Omahu, Fernhill
- Tributaries
  - left: Waiwhakamate Stream, Purungetungetu Stream, Ngaawapurua Stream / Harkness Stream, Omarukokere Stream, Rocks Ahead Stream, Kiwi Creek, Waikarekare Stream, Omahaki Stream, Ōtamauri Stream, Kikowhero Stream, Waitio Stream, Ōhiwa Stream, Tūtaekurī-Waimate Stream, Tūtaekurī River
  - right: Te Matia Stream, Panoko Stream / Gold Creek, Tapahiwhenua Stream, Manson Creek, Raoraoroa Stream, Kakekino Stream, Moatangiora Stream, Taruarau River, Kōau Stream, Waitutu Stream, Waitutaki Stream, Pōpōrangi Stream, Caron Stream, Mangatahi Stream, Maraekākaho River
- Bridges: Ngaruroro Cableway, Cameron Swing Bridge (removed), Ngaruroro Brudge (Taihape-Napier Road), Fernhill Bridge, Ngaruroro River Bridge (Hawke's Bay Expressway), Chesterhope Bridge Number 2, Ngaruroro Railway Bridge (Palmerston North–Gisborne Line), Ngaruroro Bridge (State Highway 51)

The Ngaruroro River is located in the eastern North Island of New Zealand. It runs for a total of 164 km (102 mi) southeast from the Kaweka Range, Kaimanawa Range and Ruahine Range and then east before emptying into Hawke Bay roughly halfway between the cities of Napier and Hastings, near the town of Clive (drainage area 2,000 square kilometres (770 sq mi) above Tūtaekurī River confluence). About 40% of the catchment is pasture, and 55% native forest.

== Etymology ==
The river is given a longer name in Te Reo Māori, Ngaruroro Moko-tū-ā-raro ki Rangatira or Nga-ngaru-o-nga-upokororo-mai-i-mokotuararo-ki-Rangatira. The name was given by the ancestor Mahu, and recalls an incident where his dog startled a school of upokororo (New Zealand graylings), which caused a great number of ripples (ngaru) in the water. An alternative name for the river is Ngaru Roromoko Tuararo ki Rangatira.

The river was briefly known as the Plassey River to early European settlers, before the name Ngaruroro River grew in popularity.

== Course ==
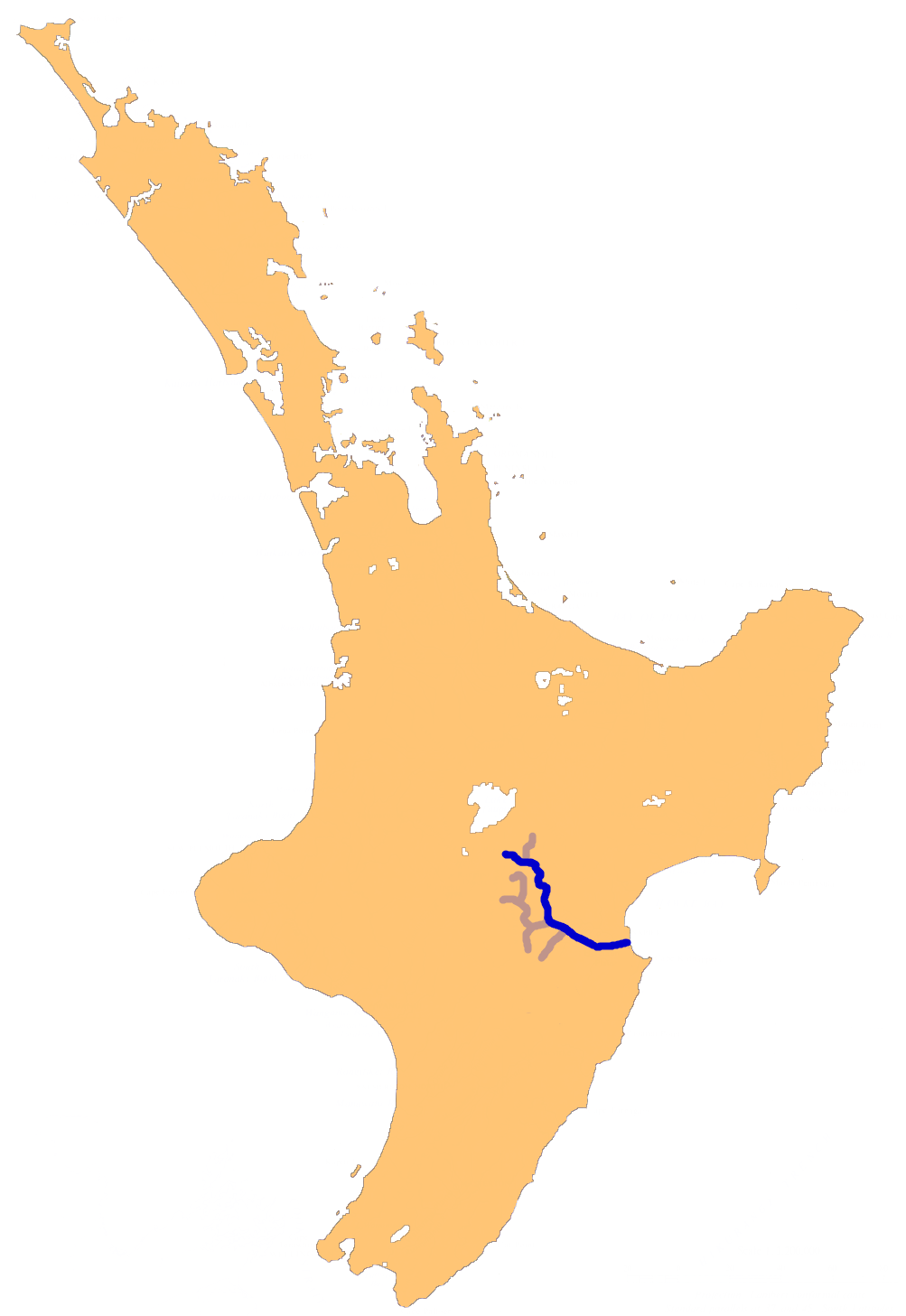
Ngaruroro river system

The upper Ngaruroro drains the Kaweka Forest Park, and it is used for trout fishing (mostly rainbow), rafting, tramping and deer hunting.

The river is mostly a single-thread channel down to Whanawhana (45 kilometres (28 mi) from the coast), flowing through a greywacke rock gorge. Below Whanawhana, the river opens to wide braided channel and is joined by the Maraekakaho River. The Ngaruroro shares a river mouth with the Tūtaekurī River, Clive River and Muddy Creek. The meeting of these rivers forms the Waitangi Estuary.

=== Aquifer ===
The Ngaruroro River recharges freshwater to the Heretaunga groundwater aquifer (in the order of four cubic metres per second (140 cu ft/s)). This aquifer feeds several streams in the area (e.g. Raupare, Irongate), in addition to pumping that supports extensive orchards of the Heretaunga Plains. Eventually the aquifer discharges to the sea in submarine springs some 20 kilometres (12 mi) off the coast.

== Flooding ==
The Ngaruroro is one of several rivers that helped form the alluvial Heretaunga Plains at the south end of the coast of Hawke Bay. The course of the Ngaruroro has changed several times, originally flowing down what is now the Clive River. It changed to much of its present course in 1867 during a major flood. In 1969, the bottom four kilometres (2.5 mi) of river was diverted more directly to the coast (near Pakowhai Road) in an effort to reduce flooding. The river is now contained within flood banks in these lower reaches from Fernhill, Hawke's Bay to the mouth of the river. The Karamu and Clive remain as rivers, but drain a smaller catchment.

The river breached its flood banks during Cyclone Gabrielle in February 2023, inundating a large area of the Heretaunga Plains. The settlements of Omahu, Waiohiki and Pakowhai were severely affected with dozens of homes being destroyed. Large areas of orchards and vineyards were ruined and homes in Taradale were evacuated. Bridges 216 and 217 (Waitangi Washout) on the Palmerston North–Gisborne railway line and Waitangi Park Bridge on SH51 were damaged.

== History ==
The river is traditionally important to Ngāti Kahungunu, especially the hapū of Ngāti Kahungunu ki Te Whanganui-a-Orotu and Heretaunga Tamatea. The lower river was traditionally used as a transportation route between the Hawke Bay coast and the mountains. Numerus archaeological sites are found along the river, and the river is an important tranditional food source for fishing.

== See also ==
- List of rivers of New Zealand
