= Taruarau River =

River in New Zealand

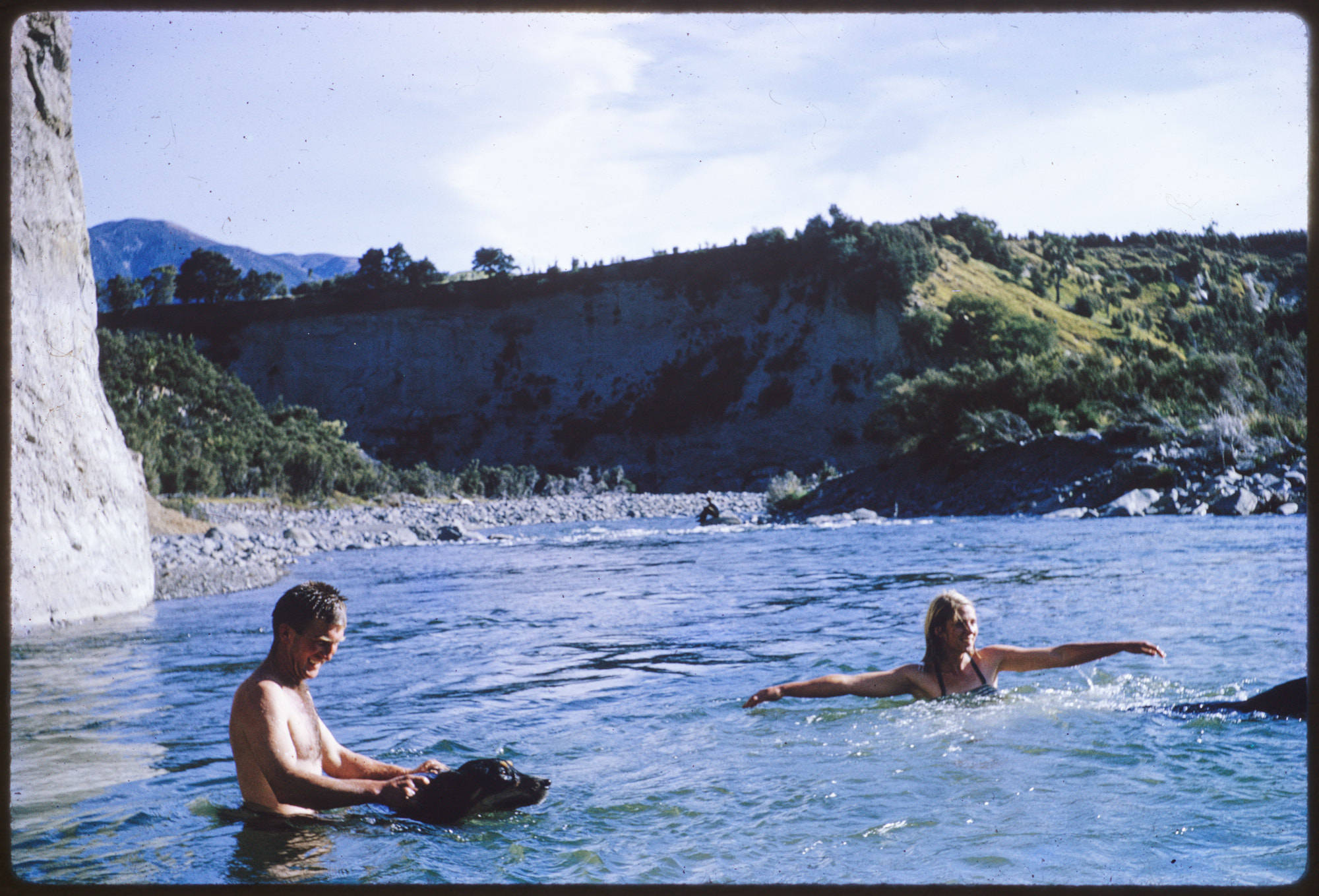
- Taruarau River in the 1960s
- Route of the Taruarau River
- Mouth of the Taruarau River Taruarau River (North Island)
- Native name: Tāruarau (Māori)

Location
- Country: New Zealand
- Island: North Island
- Region: Hawke's Bay
- District: Rangitikei, Hastings

Physical characteristics
- Source: Tawake Tohunga Range
  - coordinates: 39.22102°S 176.11578°E
- Mouth: Ngaruroro River
  - coordinates: 39°30′12″S 176°20′23″E
- Length: 40 km (25 mi)

Basin features
- Progression: Taruarau River → Ngaruroro River → Hawke Bay → Pacific Ocean
- Tributaries
  - left: Rocky Creek, Mangataramea Stream, Timahanga Stream
  - right: Stony Creek, Ngawaiawhitu / Poverty Creek Stream, Woolwash Creek, Kaianu Stream, Tamateaatautahi Stream, Ikawetea Stream
- Bridges: Taruarau River Brige

The Taruarau River is a river in the Hawke's Bay region of the eastern North Island of New Zealand. It is located 100 km (62 mi) northwest of Napier. It flows south for 40 km (25 mi) from the Tawake Tohunga Range, before flowing into the Ngaruroro River 60 km (37 mi) from that river's outflow into Hawke Bay.

== Geography ==
The river rises from the Tawake Tohunga Range of the Kaimanawa Range, flowing south across tussock country, scrub-dominated valleys and gorges, before joining the Ngaruroro River. Much of the lower section of the river forms part of the border between the Rangitikei District and Hastings District, between the Ikawatea Stream and the Ngaruroro River.

== History ==
The river has traditional significance to Heretaunga Tamatea of Ngāti Kahungunu and Ngāti Tūwharetoa, serving as a marker between the rohe of the two iwi. Near the mouth of the Ikawetea Stream is a location called Te Upokororo-o-Kahungunu, where the ancestor Kahungunu sat on a rock to wait for upokororo (New Zealand graylings).

== Recreation ==
The river is highly valued for fishing and kayaking, especially salmon and trout fishing.
