= Harapaki Wind Farm =

Wind farm project in New Zealand

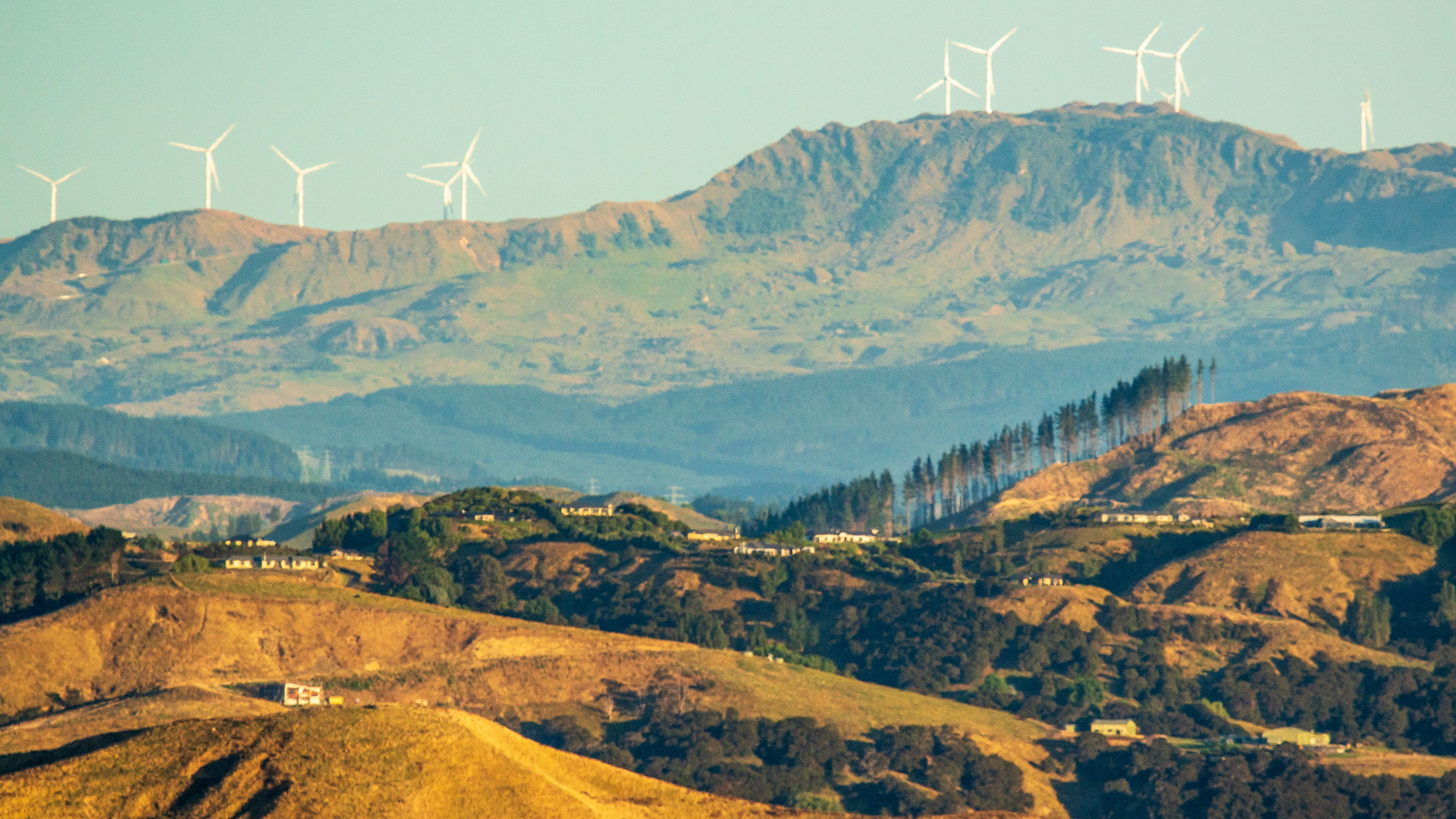
- Harapaki Wind Farm from Napier
- Country: New Zealand
- Location: Hawke's Bay
- Coordinates: 39°11′2″S 176°41′35″E
- Status: Operational
- Owner: Meridian Energy
- Operator: Meridian Energy

Wind farm
- Hub height: 85 metres (279 ft)
- Rotor diameter: 120 metres (390 ft)

Power generation
- Units operational: 41
- Nameplate capacity: 176 MW
- Annual net output: 542 GWh

The Harapaki Wind Farm is a wind farm project in the Hawke's Bay region of New Zealand. Construction began in June 2021 and was completed in 2024. As of 2024 it is the second-biggest wind farm in New Zealand.

== History ==
In 2006, Hawke's Bay Wind Farm Ltd was granted resource consent for a 75 turbine, 225 MW wind farm at Titiokura. The same year Unison Networks was granted consent for a 15 turbine, 45 MW development. Both consents were upheld by the Environment Court in October 2006. A proposed expansion of Unison's project was rejected by the Environment Court in 2009.

In 2010 Hawke's Bay Wind Farm Ltd was purchased by Meridian Energy. Unison's consent was purchased in 2011, and the sites combined.

In August 2019 Meridian sought interest from potential contractors for the wind farm's construction. Construction was expected to begin in 2020, but was delayed due to the possible closure of the Tiwai Point aluminium smelter. In February 2021 Meridian announced that construction would begin later that year, and would take approximately three years. Site preparation began in mid-2021. The first turbines arrived in Napier in March 2023 and transportation of components to the wind farm site began in July 2023 when State Highway 5 had been sufficiently repaired following the damage caused by Cyclone Gabrielle.

The wind farm began generating in November 2023 and reached full capacity in July 2024.

== Location ==
The wind farm is built on the Maungaharuru Range, near the Titiokura Summit, about 34 km northwest of Napier Airport. The altitude of the range is approximately 1300 metres.

== Operation ==
The wind farm uses 41 Siemens Gamesa 4.3 MW turbines, measuring 85 m (279 ft) from base to hub with a rotor diameter of 120 m (394 ft). Electricity is supplied to the national grid via a new substation on Transpower's Redclyffe-Whirinaki-Wairakei 220 kV transmission line.

== See also ==
- Wind power in New Zealand
