= Maungaharuru Range =

Mountain range in New Zealand

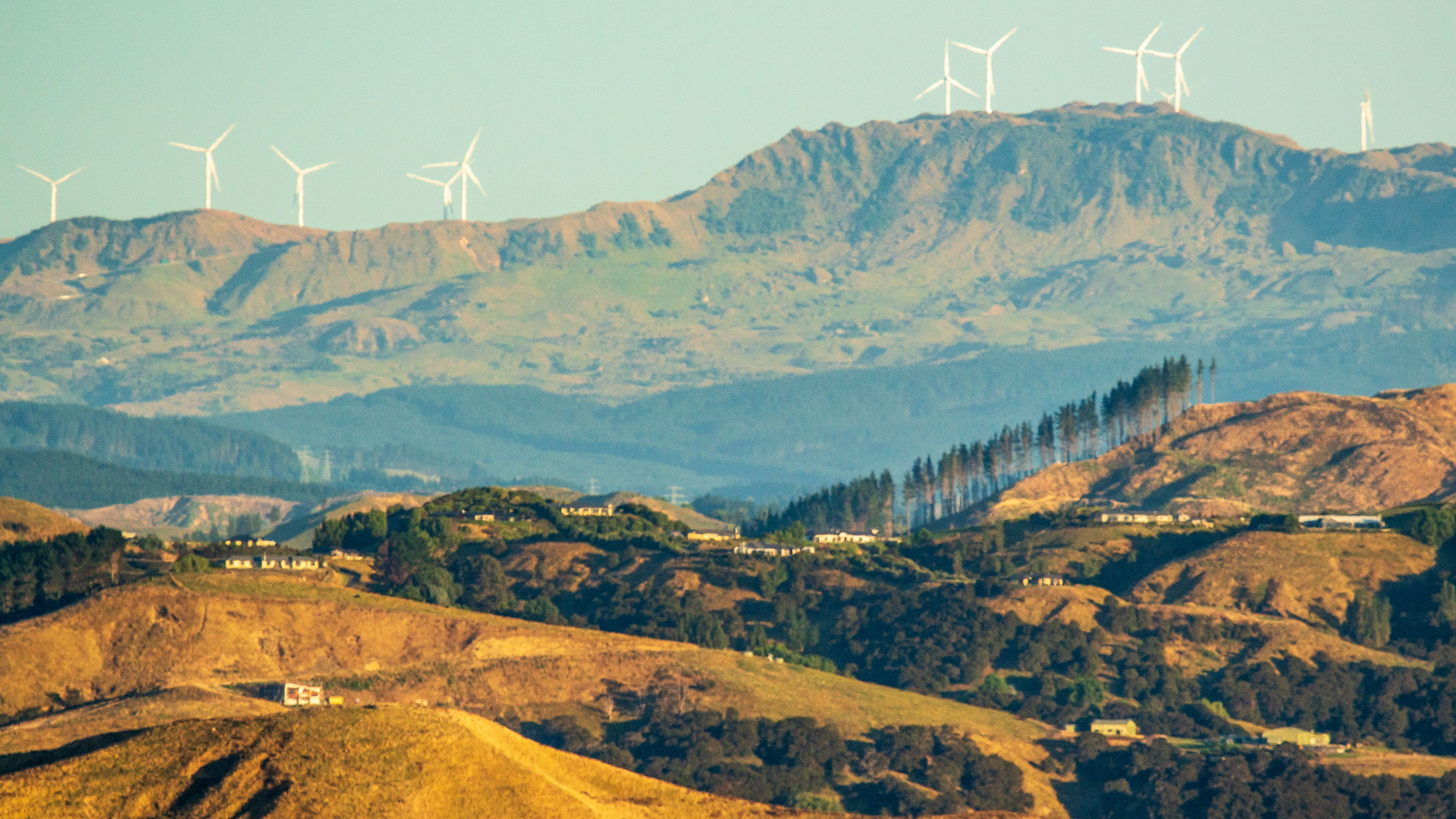
- Harapaki Wind Farm on the Maungaharuru Range

Highest point
- Peak: Tarapōnui
- Elevation: 1,308 m (4,291 ft)
- Coordinates: 39.12°S 176.76°E

Geography
- Location within New Zealand
- Country: New Zealand

The Maungaharuru Range is located 34 km (21 mi) from Napier in the New Zealand region of Hawke's Bay. The name means in the mountain that resounded in Te Reo Māori due to the bird population.

Maungaharuru is the spiritual mountain of the hapū Ngati Kurumōkihi. They are the kaitiaki of Boundary Stream and the area. In 2017 the hapū were given four conservation reserves in the Hawke's Bay by the Crown as part of Treaty of Waitangi settlements. The Ngati Kurumōkihi hapū gave the reserves to the people of New Zealand (Aotearoa), three of these conservation areas are located in the Maungaharuru Range.

== Conservation ==
The Maungaharuru Ecological District is part of the Maungaharuru Range, a conservation reserve known as the Boundary Stream Mainland Island. There are five tracks are maintained by the New Zealand Department of Conservation through the reserve called the Boundary Stream tracks. These include a walk to Hawke's Bay's highest waterfall, Shine Falls which is 58 metres high, and the rock formation named Bell Rock. This conservation reserve makes up 800 hectares of the Maungaharuru Range which is home to native plant and bird species including wētā, kaka and kiwi. The elevation in this reserve is 300 metres above sea level at its lowest to 950 metres high in the range.

=== Pest management ===
An organised pest management programme began in 1996 in the area by Predator Free Hawke's Bay to remove the introduced mammals destroying the natural environment. Predator Free programmes aim to create an environment where native species could survive. In 2018 Titi (Cook's Petrel) were returned to their original nesting site in the range through the translocation project Poutiri Ao o Tane.

== Geography ==
The smaller Bellbird Bush Scenic Reserve, Opouahi Scenic Reserve and Thomas Bush Scenic Reserved are also located in the Maungaharuru Ranges. The rest of the range is farmland. Tarapōnui Peak is a part of this range, rising to 1,308 m (4,291 ft). The range is rugged with high winds, this environment has attracted two wind farm consents for a Hawke's Bay wind farm.

== Renewable generation ==
In 2005 two consents were issued in the Maungaharuru area, one for the private company Hawkes Bay Wind Farm Ltd and the other by Unison Networks Limited. The two consents were purchased by Meridian Energy in 2010 and 2011 respectively and were combined as one site, these consents were extended to 2023. In August 2019, Meridian sought interest from potential contractors for the wind farm's construction.
