= Kaweka Challenge =

Races held in the Kaweka Ranges, New Zealand

The Kaweka Challenge is an annual group of races held in the Kaweka Ranges, New Zealand, since 1991, consisting of five running courses and one duathlon. The Challenge is the highest endurance race in New Zealand. In 2005, the event attracted 395 competitors.

The current course record for the 41-kilometre (25 mi) event, set in 2007, is held by George Christison, who finished with a time of 05:13:29.

The start and finish line of every course is held at the bottom of the Kuripapango hill. For each course, the first challenge is reaching the summit of the hill, a steep climb of 750 metres (2,460 ft).
