= Kaweka Range =

Mountain range

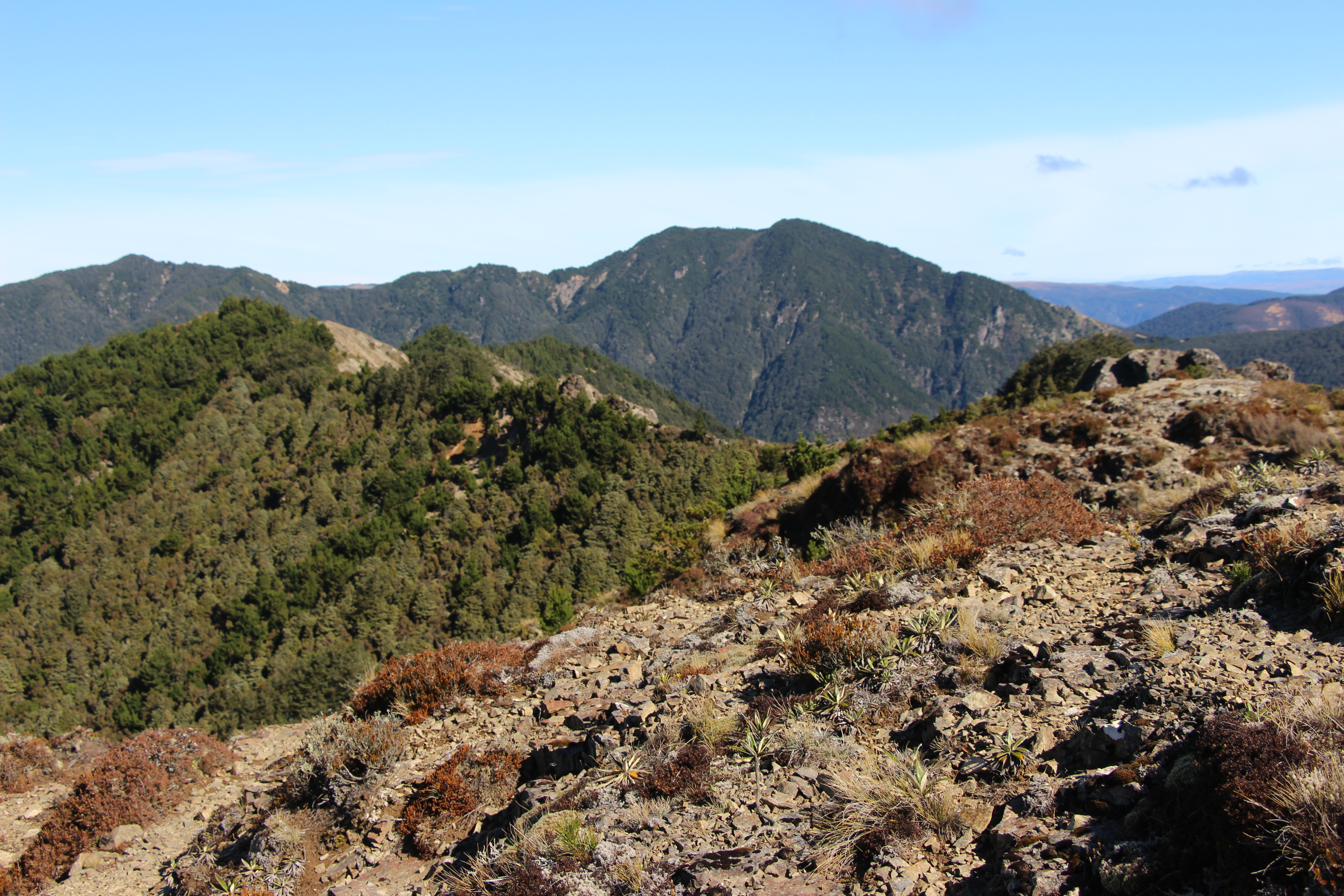

Highest point
- Peak: Kaweka
- Elevation: 1,724 m (5,656 ft)
- Coordinates: 39°17′0″S 176°22′44.45″E

Dimensions
- Length: 14 km (8.7 mi)

Geography
- Country: New Zealand
- Region: Hawke's Bay
- Range coordinates: 39°15′S 176°20′E

The Kaweka Range (also known as the Kaweka Ranges or just the Kawekas) of mountains is located in inland Hawke's Bay in the eastern North Island (Te Ika-a-Māui) of New Zealand. It forms part of the mountainous spine of the North Island which extends from Wellington to East Cape, including the Tararua and Ruahine ranges.

The range lies between the city of Napier, 55 kilometres (34 mi) to the southeast, and Lake Taupō, 50 kilometres (31 mi) to the northwest. It is the source of many rivers which flow into Hawke Bay, including among them the Tūtaekurī, Mohaka, and Ngaruroro Rivers.

The highest point in the range is Kaweka J (1,724 metres (5,656 ft)). The bush line varies from 1000 m to 1300 m.

A tramping track follows the ridge line of the entire range. The Kaweka challenge is a running race held annually in the range since 1990.

== Climate ==
Climate data for Makahu Saddle DOC Hut, elevation 974 m (3,196 ft), (1965–1975)
Month	Jan	Feb	Mar	Apr	May	Jun	Jul	Aug	Sep	Oct	Nov	Dec	Year
Record high °C (°F)	27.4 (81.3)	30.8 (87.4)	25.0 (77.0)	20.8 (69.4)	17.8 (64.0)	16.1 (61.0)	15.3 (59.5)	15.7 (60.3)	19.9 (67.8)	22.3 (72.1)	23.2 (73.8)	27.8 (82.0)	30.8 (87.4)
Mean daily maximum °C (°F)	18.5 (65.3)	18.6 (65.5)	16.5 (61.7)	13.3 (55.9)	10.2 (50.4)	7.7 (45.9)	6.8 (44.2)	7.8 (46.0)	10.4 (50.7)	13.7 (56.7)	15.3 (59.5)	16.6 (61.9)	13.0 (55.3)
Daily mean °C (°F)	13.6 (56.5)	13.7 (56.7)	12.2 (54.0)	9.6 (49.3)	6.8 (44.2)	4.5 (40.1)	3.6 (38.5)	4.4 (39.9)	6.4 (43.5)	8.8 (47.8)	10.4 (50.7)	12.0 (53.6)	8.8 (47.9)
Mean daily minimum °C (°F)	8.6 (47.5)	8.7 (47.7)	7.8 (46.0)	5.8 (42.4)	3.3 (37.9)	1.2 (34.2)	0.3 (32.5)	1.0 (33.8)	2.4 (36.3)	3.8 (38.8)	5.5 (41.9)	7.3 (45.1)	4.6 (40.3)
Record low °C (°F)	0.0 (32.0)	0.1 (32.2)	−1.0 (30.2)	−1.8 (28.8)	−4.3 (24.3)	−5.0 (23.0)	−5.5 (22.1)	−5.3 (22.5)	−5.6 (21.9)	−4.9 (23.2)	−3.3 (26.1)	−4.4 (24.1)	−5.6 (21.9)
Average rainfall mm (inches)	163.7 (6.44)	173.5 (6.83)	184.9 (7.28)	257.0 (10.12)	222.8 (8.77)	258.1 (10.16)	250.9 (9.88)	257.1 (10.12)	200.3 (7.89)	157.8 (6.21)	162.8 (6.41)	192.7 (7.59)	2,481.6 (97.7)
Mean monthly sunshine hours	190.0	143.3	151.4	125.5	118.6	100.8	103.4	111.4	145.0	190.0	169.7	165.6	1,714.7
Source: NIWA

Climate data for Dominie DOC Hut, elevation 1,478 m (4,849 ft), (1969–1973)
Month	Jan	Feb	Mar	Apr	May	Jun	Jul	Aug	Sep	Oct	Nov	Dec	Year
Mean daily maximum °C (°F)	15.0 (59.0)	14.3 (57.7)	13.4 (56.1)	9.7 (49.5)	6.0 (42.8)	4.2 (39.6)	2.3 (36.1)	4.0 (39.2)	6.4 (43.5)	9.0 (48.2)	11.4 (52.5)	13.3 (55.9)	9.1 (48.3)
Daily mean °C (°F)	11.3 (52.3)	10.6 (51.1)	10.1 (50.2)	6.7 (44.1)	3.6 (38.5)	2.3 (36.1)	0.4 (32.7)	1.5 (34.7)	3.2 (37.8)	5.5 (41.9)	7.8 (46.0)	10.0 (50.0)	6.1 (42.9)
Mean daily minimum °C (°F)	7.6 (45.7)	6.8 (44.2)	6.8 (44.2)	3.6 (38.5)	1.1 (34.0)	0.3 (32.5)	−1.5 (29.3)	−1.1 (30.0)	−0.1 (31.8)	1.9 (35.4)	4.2 (39.6)	6.6 (43.9)	3.0 (37.4)
Source: NIWA

== See also ==
- Kaweka Challenge
- Kaweka Forest Park
