= Tarapōnui =

Highest point
- Elevation: 1,308 m (4,291 ft)
- Coordinates: 39.134°S 176.74°E

Geography
- Location: North Island, New Zealand
- Parent range: Maungaharuru Range

Tarapōnui is a prominent peak in inland Hawke's Bay, in New Zealand's eastern North Island. It lies between the settlements of Te Haroto and Tūtira and rises to a height of 1,308 m (4,291 ft). It is most noticed by a sharp drop on the west side and a large radio tower on top.
