= Kaweka J =

Highest point
- Elevation: 1,724 m (5,656 ft)
- Coordinates: 39.283028°S 176.379318°E

Geography
- Location: North Island, New Zealand
- Parent range: Kaweka Range

Kaweka J, also known as Mount Kaweka or Kaweka, is the highest mountain in the Kaweka Range. Situated in the central North Island of New Zealand, it has a total height of 1,724 metres (5,656 ft).

The mountain is the highest point in the Hawke's Bay region.
