= Fernhill, Hawke's Bay =

Fernhill
- Village
- Interactive map of Fernhill
- Country: New Zealand
- Region: Hawkes Bay
- District: Hastings District

Fernhill is a village and rural community in the Hastings District and Hawke's Bay Region of New Zealand's North Island. It is located on State Highway 50, north-west of Hastings on the south bank of the Ngaruroro River.

Due to cloud cover over much of the country, Fernhill was one of the few places in New Zealand where the January 2018 lunar eclipse was clearly visible.
