= Kuripapango =

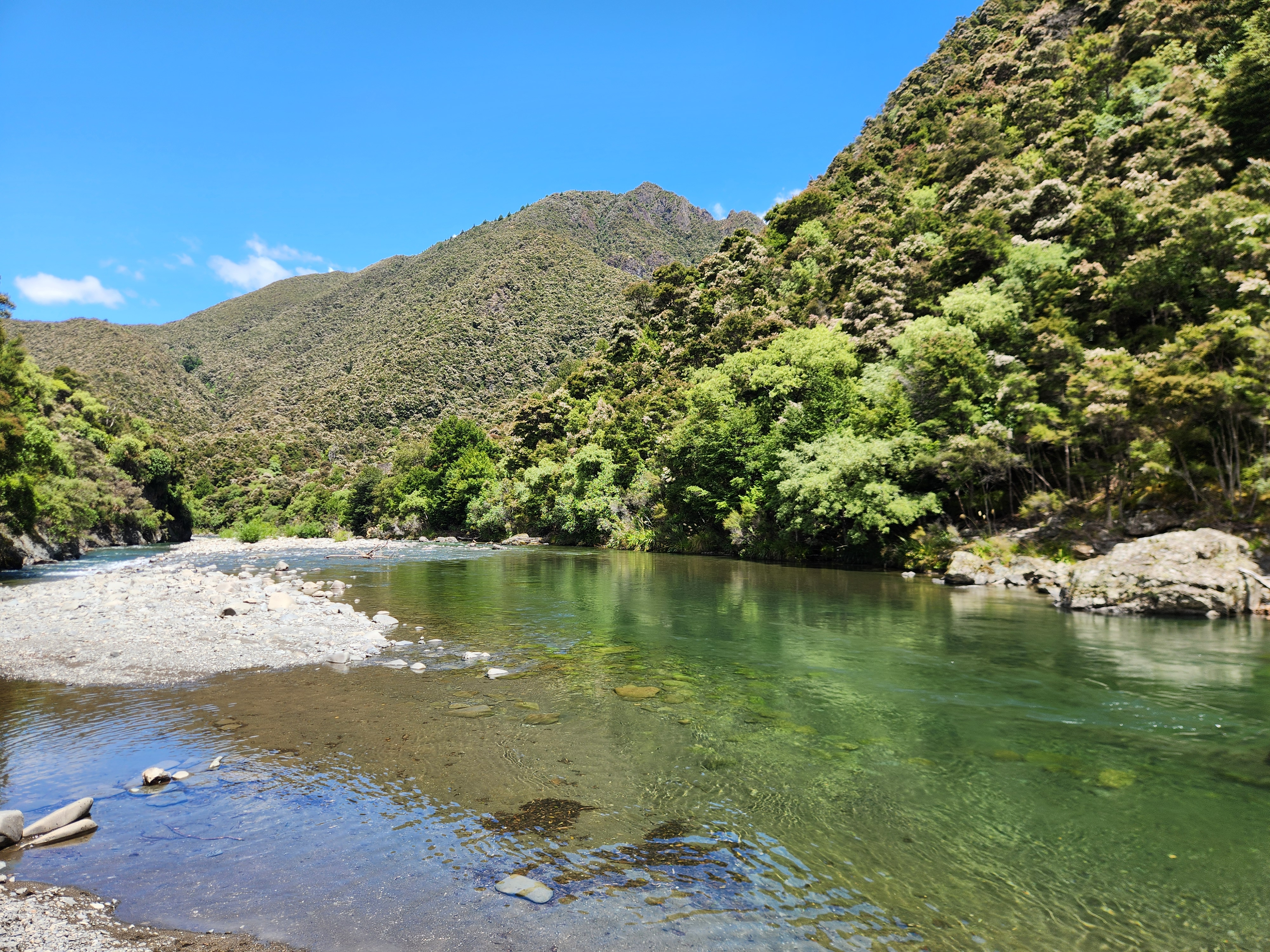
- Ngaruroro River at Kuripapango

- Location within North Island
- Coordinates: 39.395°S 176.370°E
- Country: New Zealand
- Region: Hawke's Bay
- Territorial authority: Hastings District

Kuripapango is a locality in the Hawke's Bay region of New Zealand, situated 76.6 km from Napier and 78.6 km from Taihape. It is on the Napier-Taihape Road more known as the Gentle Annie which rises to 4,101 feet (1,250 m) at its peak.

In the early days Kuripapango was a health resort with stores, two hotels and a weekly mail run. Both hotels ended up burning down and Kuripapango fell into decline. Today it is a popular tramping and kayaking area. The name "Kuripapango" is a Māori-language word meaning "spotty dog".

== Climate ==
Climate data for Kuripapango (1954–1967)
| Month | Jan | Feb | Mar | Apr | May | Jun | Jul | Aug | Sep | Oct | Nov | Dec | Year |
|---|---|---|---|---|---|---|---|---|---|---|---|---|---|
| Record high °C (°F) | 31.8 (89.2) | 29.4 (84.9) | 29.6 (85.3) | 27.3 (81.1) | 22.5 (72.5) | 21.1 (70.0) | 19.4 (66.9) | 18.7 (65.7) | 21.8 (71.2) | 25.0 (77.0) | 26.7 (80.1) | 28.1 (82.6) | 31.8 (89.2) |
| Mean daily maximum °C (°F) | 22.3 (72.1) | 22.5 (72.5) | 19.8 (67.6) | 16.7 (62.1) | 14.0 (57.2) | 11.5 (52.7) | 10.3 (50.5) | 11.3 (52.3) | 13.6 (56.5) | 16.1 (61.0) | 18.4 (65.1) | 20.0 (68.0) | 16.4 (61.5) |
| Daily mean °C (°F) | 16.0 (60.8) | 16.3 (61.3) | 13.9 (57.0) | 11.2 (52.2) | 8.7 (47.7) | 6.4 (43.5) | 5.5 (41.9) | 6.4 (43.5) | 8.3 (46.9) | 10.7 (51.3) | 12.9 (55.2) | 14.5 (58.1) | 10.9 (51.6) |
| Mean daily minimum °C (°F) | 9.9 (49.8) | 10.0 (50.0) | 8.1 (46.6) | 5.7 (42.3) | 3.4 (38.1) | 1.2 (34.2) | 0.8 (33.4) | 1.5 (34.7) | 2.9 (37.2) | 5.2 (41.4) | 7.2 (45.0) | 8.9 (48.0) | 5.4 (41.7) |
| Record low °C (°F) | −2.7 (27.1) | −1.1 (30.0) | −3.2 (26.2) | −4.9 (23.2) | −6.9 (19.6) | −11.6 (11.1) | −8.1 (17.4) | −6.9 (19.6) | −6.3 (20.7) | −5.3 (22.5) | −3.9 (25.0) | −1.3 (29.7) | −11.6 (11.1) |
| Average rainfall mm (inches) | 85.8 (3.38) | 82.3 (3.24) | 129.8 (5.11) | 112.4 (4.43) | 140.8 (5.54) | 169.3 (6.67) | 195.5 (7.70) | 155.0 (6.10) | 115.5 (4.55) | 106.1 (4.18) | 84.1 (3.31) | 141.9 (5.59) | 1,518.5 (59.8) |
Source: NIWA (rain 1954–1975)
