= Maraekākaho =

Settlement in Hawke's Bay Region, New Zealand

- Settlement
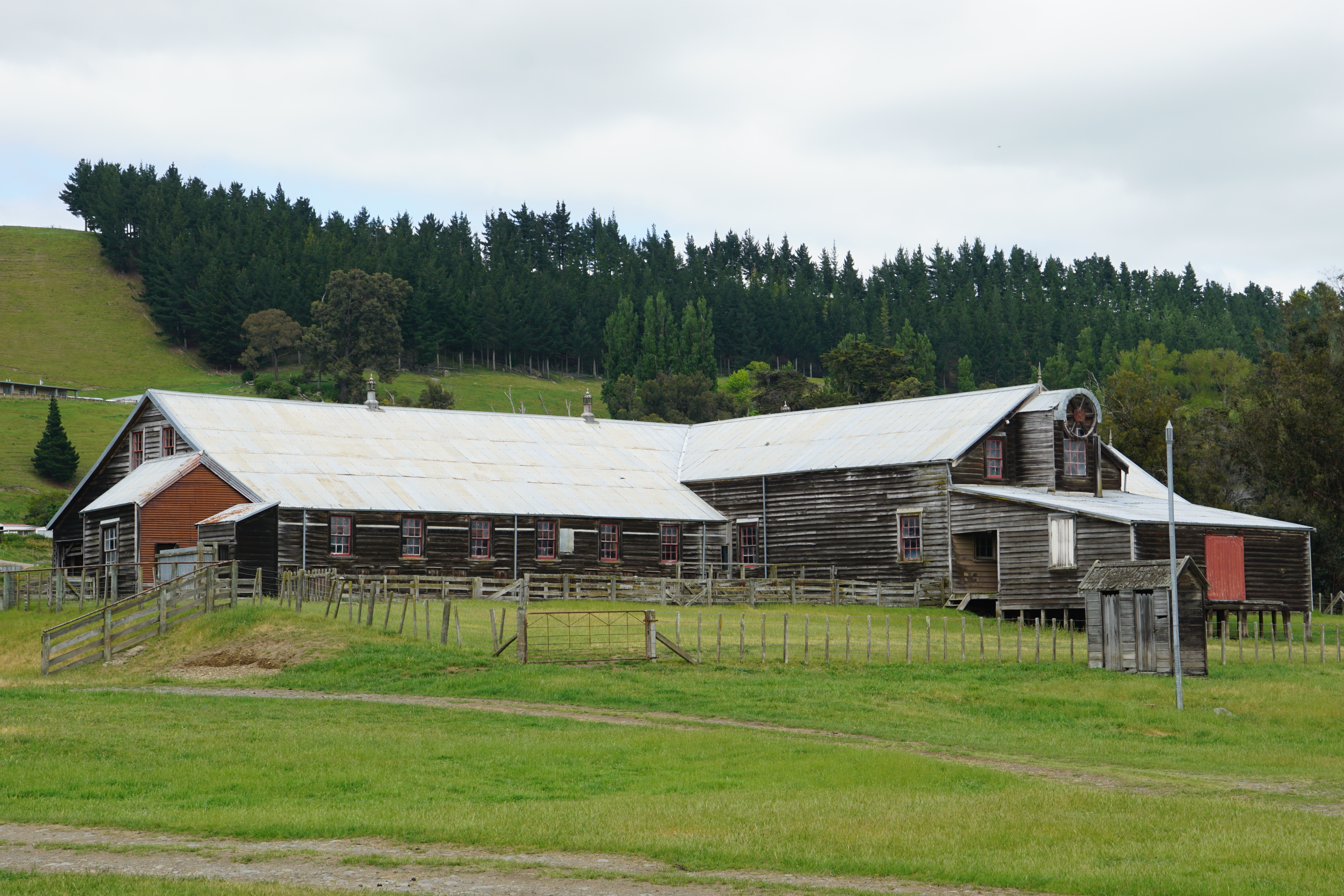
- Woolshed in Maraekākaho
- Interactive map of Maraekākaho
- Coordinates: 39.648668°S 176.617552°E
- Country: New Zealand
- Region: Hawke's Bay Region
- Territorial authority: Hastings District
- Ward: Kahurānaki General Ward; Takitimu Māori Ward
- Community: Hastings District Rural Community
- Subdivision: Maraekākaho subdivision
- Electorates: Tukituki; Ikaroa-Rāwhiti (Māori)

Government
  - Territorial Authority: Hastings District Council
  - Regional council: Hawke's Bay Regional Council
  - Mayor of Hastings: Wendy Schollum
  - Tukituki MP: Catherine Wedd
  - Ikaroa-Rāwhiti MP: Cushla Tangaere-Manuel

Area
  - Total: 151.29 km^{2} (58.41 sq mi)

Population (2023 Census)
  - Total: 765
  - Density: 5.06/km^{2} (13.1/sq mi)
- Postcode(s): 4171

Maraekākaho is a rural settlement in the Hastings District and Hawke's Bay Region of New Zealand's North Island.

The main village was developed by Sir Douglas Maclean in the early 20th century, on a pastoral station established by his father, Sir Donald McLean, during the 19th century. The surrounding area includes lifestyle blocks, vineyards and wineries, orchards and pastoral farms.

Maraekākaho is a Māori name, translating as the area (marae) of the culm of the toetoe (kakaho); the grasses were once very common in the area.

A war memorial was set up in the settlement in 1986, commemorating the approximately 100 local men killed during World War I.

The Kereru Homestead and Station was established in 1857 on land purchased by the government from local Māori at the base of the Ruahine Ranges. It features mixed terrain, including flat land, rolling hills and ravines.

== Demographics ==
Maraekākaho and its surrounds cover 151.29 km^{2} (58.41 sq mi). It is part of the Maraekākaho statistical area.

Historical population for Maraekākaho and its surrounds
Year	Pop.	±% p.a.
2006	555	—
2013	609	+1.34%
2018	660	+1.62%
2023	765	+3.00%

Maraekākaho and its surrounds had a population of 765 in the 2023 New Zealand census, an increase of 105 people (15.9%) since the 2018 census, and an increase of 156 people (25.6%) since the 2013 census. There were 384 males and 384 females in 291 dwellings. 2.0% of people identified as LGBTIQ+. There were 141 people (18.4%) aged under 15 years, 111 (14.5%) aged 15 to 29, 402 (52.5%) aged 30 to 64, and 120 (15.7%) aged 65 or older.

People could identify as more than one ethnicity. The results were 96.1% European (Pākehā); 12.2% Māori; 1.2% Pasifika; 1.6% Asian; 0.4% Middle Eastern, Latin American and African New Zealanders (MELAA); and 1.6% other, which includes people giving their ethnicity as "New Zealander". English was spoken by 98.8%, Māori by 3.5%, and other languages by 5.5%. No language could be spoken by 2.0% (e.g. too young to talk). New Zealand Sign Language was known by 0.4%. The percentage of people born overseas was 15.7, compared with 28.8% nationally.

Religious affiliations were 28.6% Christian, 0.4% Māori religious beliefs, and 1.2% other religions. People who answered that they had no religion were 65.9%, and 5.1% of people did not answer the census question.

Of those at least 15 years old, 162 (26.0%) people had a bachelor's or higher degree, 366 (58.7%) had a post-high school certificate or diploma, and 102 (16.3%) people exclusively held high school qualifications. 90 people (14.4%) earned over $100,000 compared to 12.1% nationally. The employment status of those at least 15 was 387 (62.0%) full-time, 93 (14.9%) part-time, and 12 (1.9%) unemployed.

=== Maraekākaho statistical area ===
Maraekākaho statistical area covers 820.55 km^{2} (316.82 sq mi) and had an estimated population of 1,620 as of June 2025, with a population density of 2.0 people per km^{2}.

Historical population for the statistical area
Year	Pop.	±% p.a.
2006	1,185	—
2013	1,311	+1.45%
2018	1,392	+1.21%
2023	1,590	+2.70%

Maraekākaho statistical area had a population of 1,590 in the 2023 New Zealand census, an increase of 198 people (14.2%) since the 2018 census, and an increase of 279 people (21.3%) since the 2013 census. There were 816 males, 768 females, and 6 people of other genders in 582 dwellings. 1.9% of people identified as LGBTIQ+. The median age was 41.4 years (compared with 38.1 years nationally). There were 312 people (19.6%) aged under 15 years, 255 (16.0%) aged 15 to 29, 804 (50.6%) aged 30 to 64, and 219 (13.8%) aged 65 or older.

People could identify as more than one ethnicity. The results were 92.8% European (Pākehā); 12.6% Māori; 0.6% Pasifika; 2.5% Asian; 0.2% Middle Eastern, Latin American and African New Zealanders (MELAA); and 3.2% other, which includes people giving their ethnicity as "New Zealander". English was spoken by 98.3%, Māori by 2.6%, and other languages by 5.8%. No language could be spoken by 1.3% (e.g. too young to talk). New Zealand Sign Language was known by 0.4%. The percentage of people born overseas was 14.0, compared with 28.8% nationally.

Religious affiliations were 28.9% Christian, 0.8% Māori religious beliefs, 0.2% Buddhist, 0.2% New Age, and 0.8% other religions. People who answered that they had no religion were 64.0%, and 5.1% of people did not answer the census question.

Of those at least 15 years old, 354 (27.7%) people had a bachelor's or higher degree, 702 (54.9%) had a post-high school certificate or diploma, and 222 (17.4%) people exclusively held high school qualifications. The median income was $50,200, compared with $41,500 nationally. 186 people (14.6%) earned over $100,000 compared to 12.1% nationally. The employment status of those at least 15 was 783 (61.3%) full-time, 219 (17.1%) part-time, and 15 (1.2%) unemployed.

== Education ==
Maraekākaho School is a co-educational state primary school, with a roll of 137 as of July 2026. It opened in 1893.

Kererū School is a co-educational state primary school about 22 km (14 mi) west of Maraekākaho settlement, with a roll of 28 as of July 2026. It opened in 1912.
