= Hawke's Bay =

Region of New Zealand

Hawke's Bay Te Matau-a-Māui (Māori)
- Region
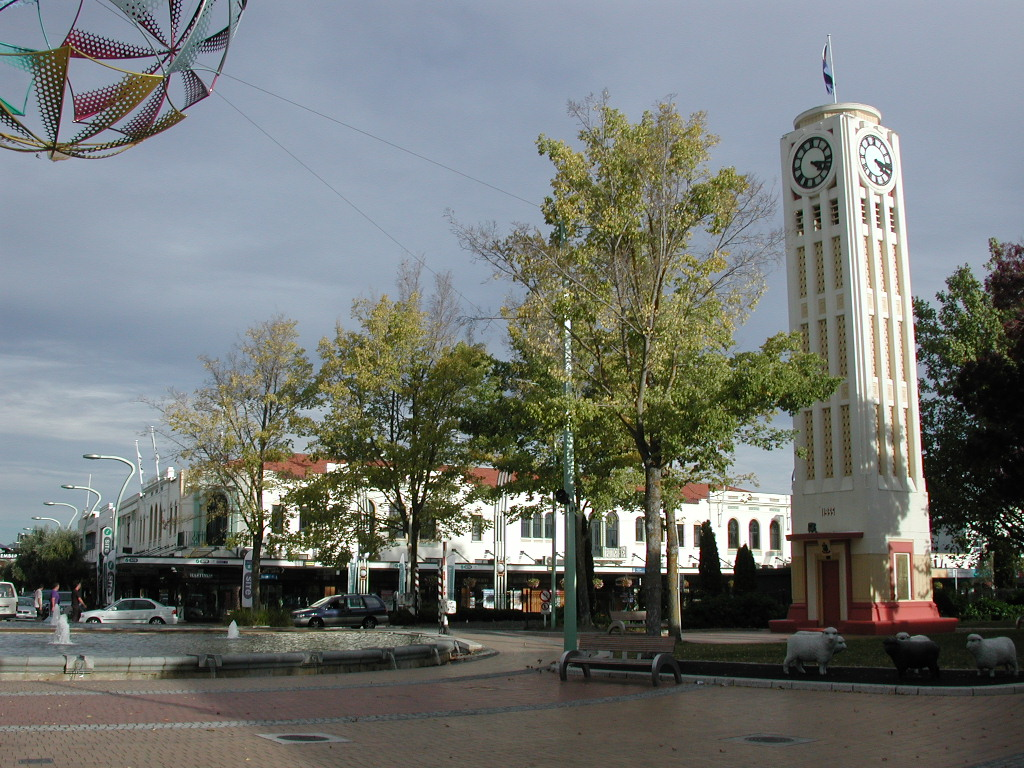
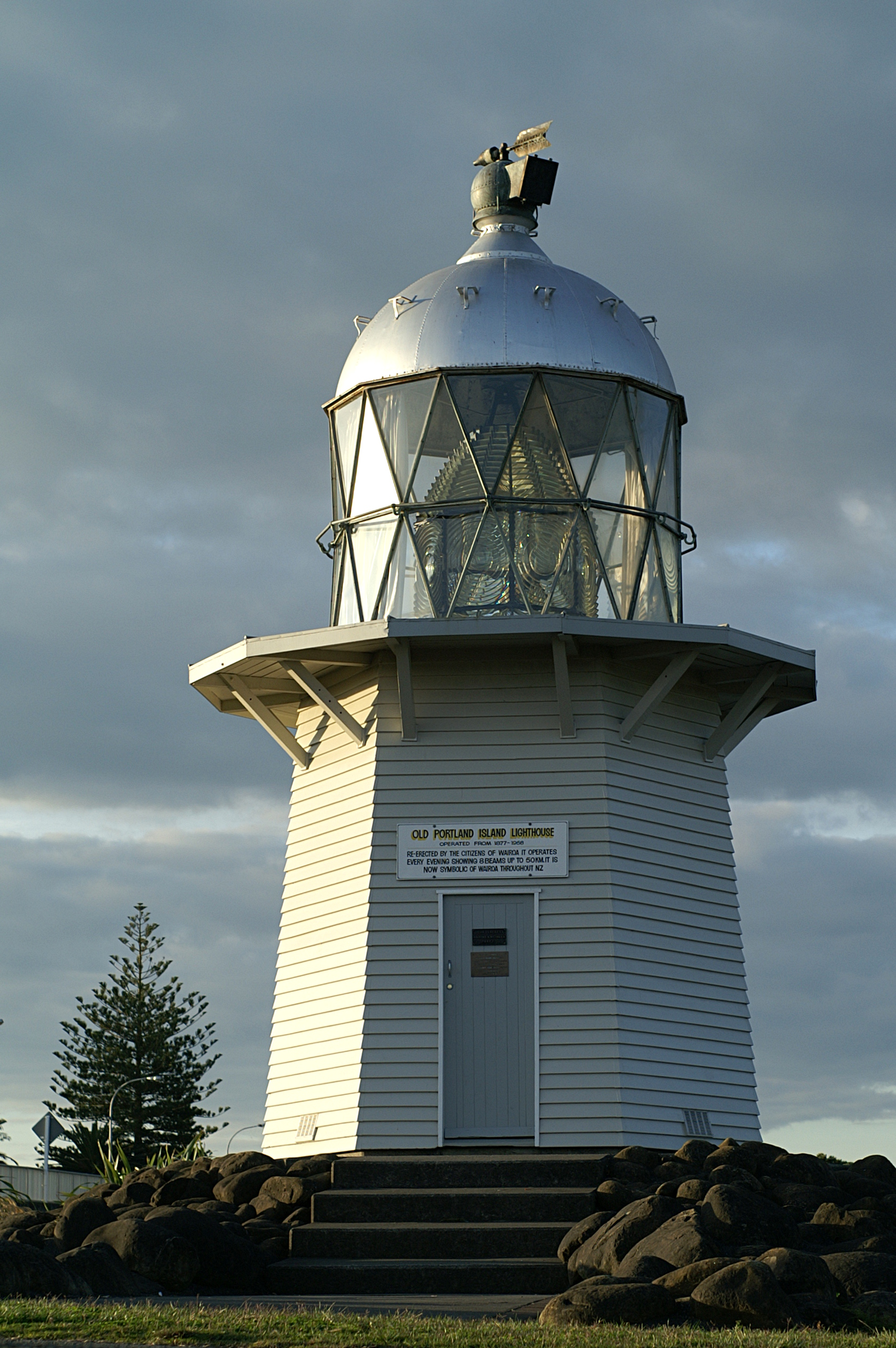
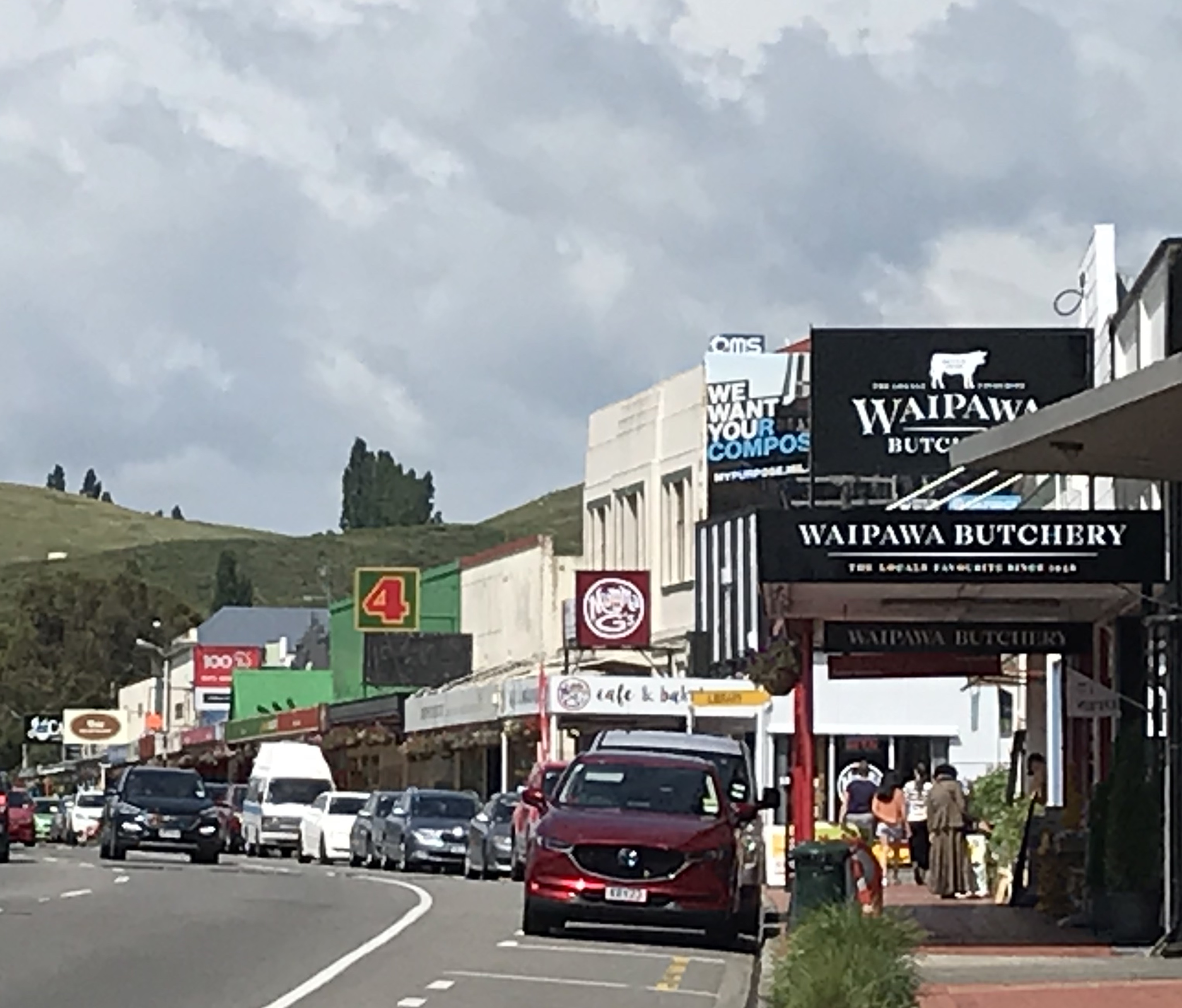
- Napier and a view towards Cape Kidnappers Hastings Wairoa Waipawa Waipukurau Māhia Peninsula

- Hawke's Bay within New Zealand
- Coordinates: 39°25′S 176°49′E
- Country: New Zealand
- Island: North Island
- Seat: Napier

Government
  - Type: Regional council
  - Body: Hawke's Bay Regional Council
  - Chair: Sophie Siers
  - Deputy chair: Jerf van Beek

Area
  - Land: 14,139.15 km^{2} (5,459.16 sq mi)
- Highest elevation (Kaweka J): 1,724 m (5,656 ft)

Population (June 2025)
  - Total: 179,700
  - Density: 12.71/km^{2} (32.92/sq mi)

GDP
  - Total: NZ$11.385 billion (2021) (8th)
  - Per capita: NZ$61,977 (2021)
- ISO 3166 code: NZ–HKB
- HDI (2023): 0.92 very high · 11th
- Website: www.hbrc.govt.nz

Hawke's Bay (Māori: Te Matau-a-Māui) is a region on the east coast of New Zealand's North Island. The region is named after Hawke Bay, which was named in honour of Edward Hawke. The region's main centres are the cities of Napier and Hastings, while the more rural parts of the region are served by the towns of Waipukurau, Waipawa, and Wairoa.

== Name ==
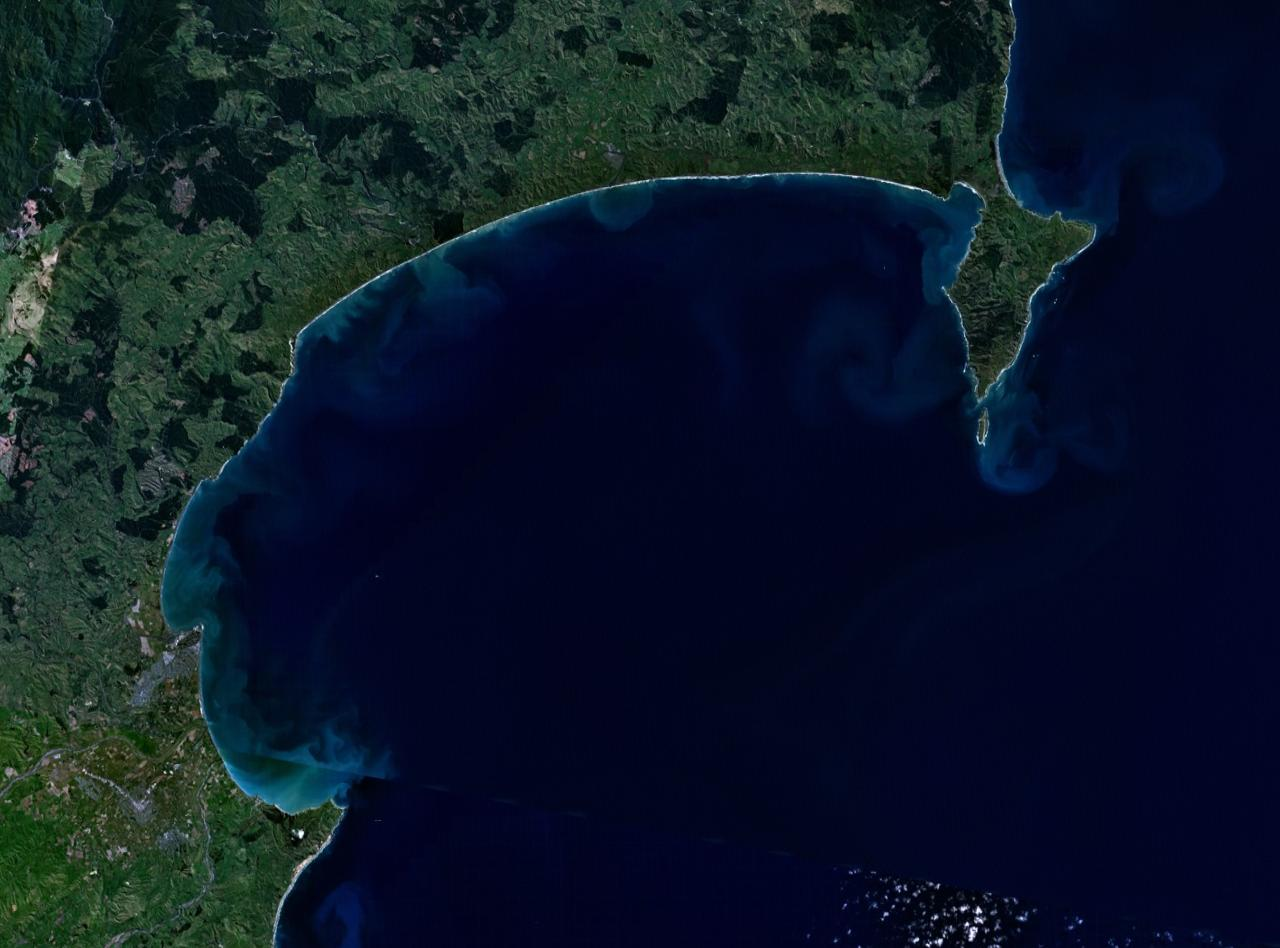
Hawke Bay

Hawke's Bay is named after the bay to its east, Hawke Bay, which was named in honour of Edward Hawke, 1st Baron Hawke by Captain James Cook during one of his voyages along the coasts of New Zealand.

The Māori language name for Hawke's Bay is Te Matau-a-Māui (lit. the fishhook belonging to Māui). This name comes from a traditional story in which Maui lifted the islands of New Zealand from the waters. The story says that Hawke's Bay is the fishhook that Māui used, with Portland Island and Cape Kidnappers being the northern and southern barbs of the hook, respectively.

Hawke's Bay is one of only two places in New Zealand with a possessive apostrophe in its name, the other being Arthur's Pass. Captain Cook originally used an apostrophe in the name for the bay, but was inconsistent and wrote the name without an apostrophe a day later. Many New Zealanders spell the name without an apostrophe.

== History ==
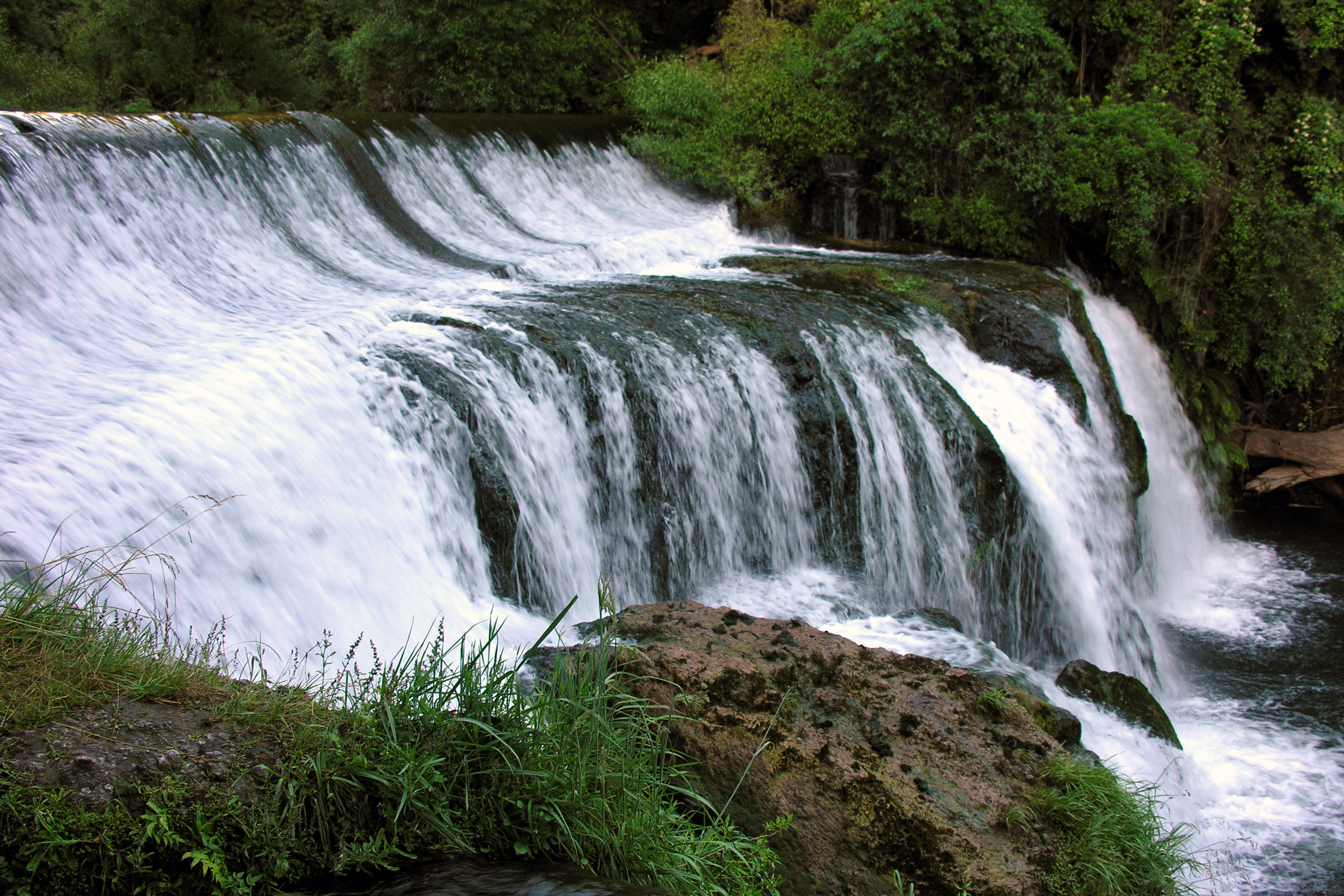
Maraetotara Falls

=== Early history ===
Bay whaling stations operated on the shores of the bay in the nineteenth century.

Hawke's Bay Province was founded in 1858 as a province of New Zealand, after being separated from the Wellington Province following a meeting in Napier in February 1858. The Province was abolished in 1876 along with all other provinces in New Zealand. It was replaced with a Provincial District.

=== 1931 earthquake ===
On 3 February 1931, Napier and Hastings were devastated by New Zealand's worst natural disaster, an earthquake measuring 7.9 on the Richter magnitude scale, which killed 256 people. Napier rebuilt and now the city is famous for its Art Deco buildings, and celebrates its heritage each February with the Art Deco Weekend. MTG Hawke's Bay, formerly Hawke's Bay Museum and Art Gallery, has an exhibition on the earthquake, its causes and impact.

=== Second World War ===
During the Second World War, the German submarine U-862 entered the waters around Napier undetected, surfacing by the Sound Shell. The submarine fired a torpedo at the Pukeko, a steamer leaving the Port of Napier, but narrowly missed.

=== Cyclone Gabrielle ===
On the 13 and 14 February 2023, Cyclone Gabrielle caused extensive damage in Hawke's Bay as it passed over the North Island. Power, phone service and internet access was cut to over 16,000 properties when the main Redcliffe substation was damaged in floodwaters after the Tutaekuri River burst its banks. Downstream, 1,000 people were evacuated from low-lying plains surrounding the river, where significant parts of Taradale, Meeanee and Awatoto were submerged.

The floodwaters destroyed 4 bridges, including Redcliffe Bridge, a major crossing just south of Taradale. SH2 and SH51 bridges were heavily damaged, but did not collapse. A span of the Palmerston North-Gisborne Line crossing the Tūtaekurī River also collapsed. The Ngaruroro River also breached its banks, flooding the town of Omahu where 20 people required evacuation via helicopter.

In Wairoa, the Wairoa River breached its banks, flooding approximately 15 percent of the town. Access to Wairoa was cut off after extensive damage on SH2's Mohaka River Bridge in the south, and landslides also closing SH2 to the north. Water supply in Central Hawke's Bay failed, and a mandatory evacuation was ordered for eastern Waipawa after the Waipara river rose to record levels. The total cost and damages are unknown at this time.

== Geography ==
The region is situated on the east coast of the North Island. It bears the former name of what is now Hawke Bay, a large semi-circular bay that extends for 100 kilometres from northeast to southwest from Māhia Peninsula to Cape Kidnappers.

The Hawke's Bay Region includes the hilly coastal land around the northern and central bay, the floodplains of the Wairoa River in the north, the wide fertile Heretaunga Plains around Hastings in the south, and a hilly interior stretching up into the Kaweka and Ruahine Ranges. The prominent peak Taraponui is located inland.

Five major rivers flow to the Hawke's Bay coast. From north to south, they are the Wairoa River, Mohaka River, Tutaekuri River, Ngaruroro River and Tukituki River. Lake Waikaremoana, situated in northern Hawke's Bay, roughly 35 km from the coast, is the largest lake in Hawke's Bay, the fourth largest in the North Island and the 16th largest in New Zealand.

The region has a hill with the longest place name in New Zealand, and the longest in the world according to the 2009 Guinness Book of Records. Taumatawhakatangihangakoauauotamateaturipukakapikimaungahoronukupokaiwhenuakitanatahu is an otherwise unremarkable hill in southern Hawke's Bay, not far from Waipukurau.

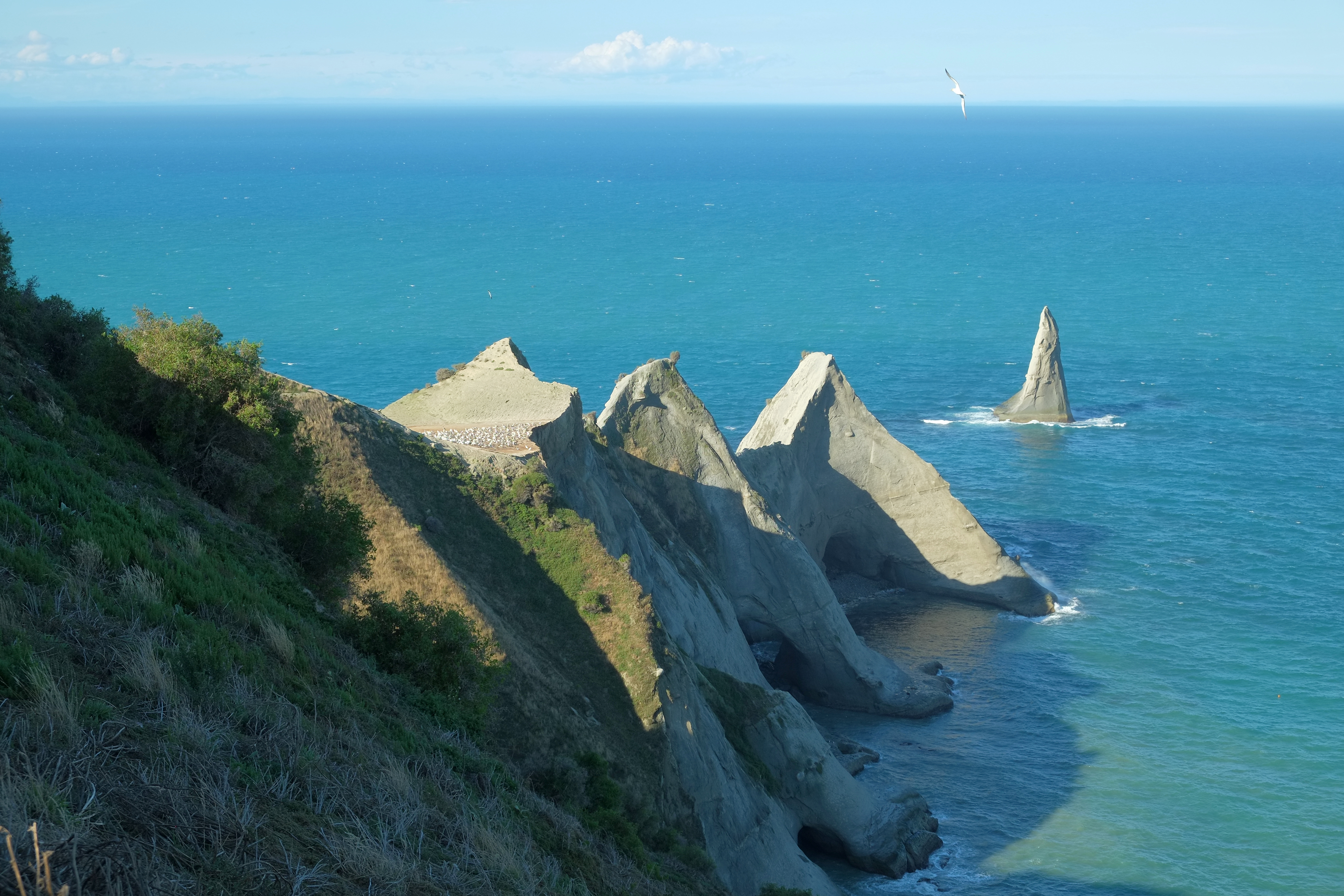
Cape Kidnappers

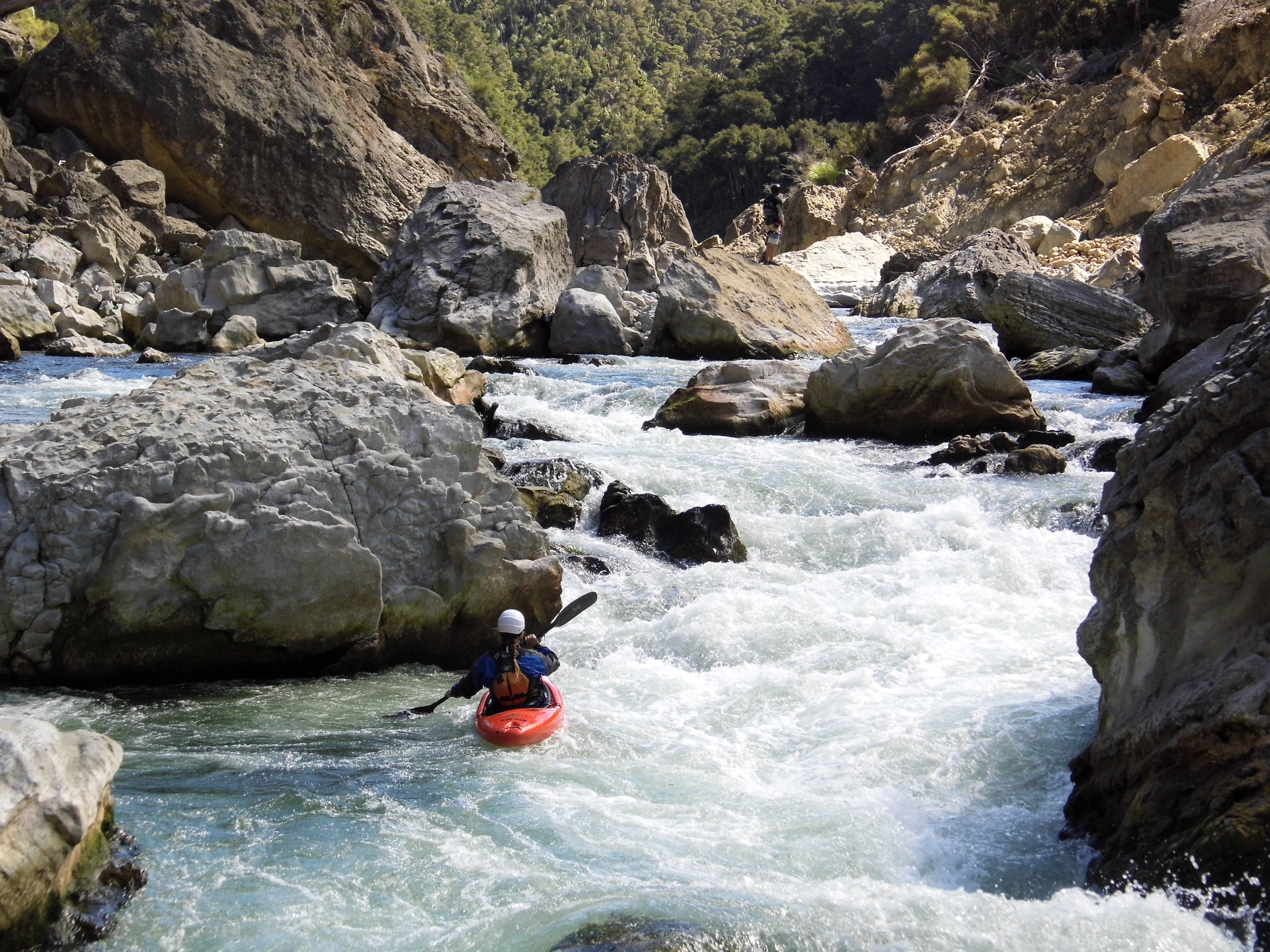
Mohaka River

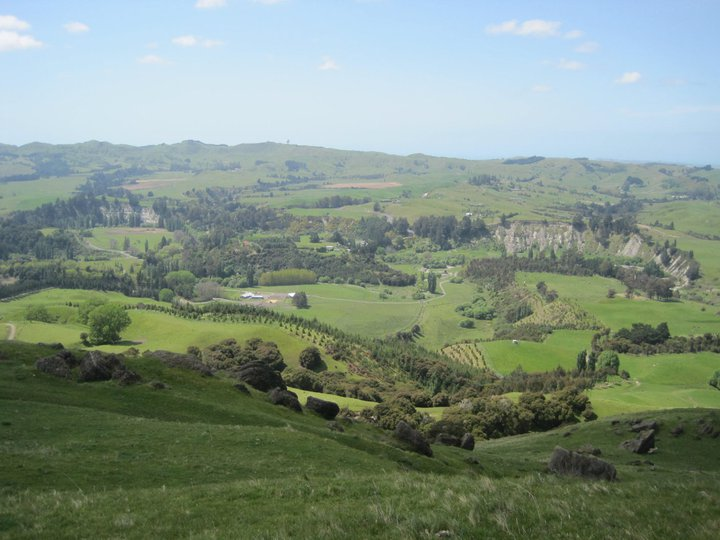
Countryside

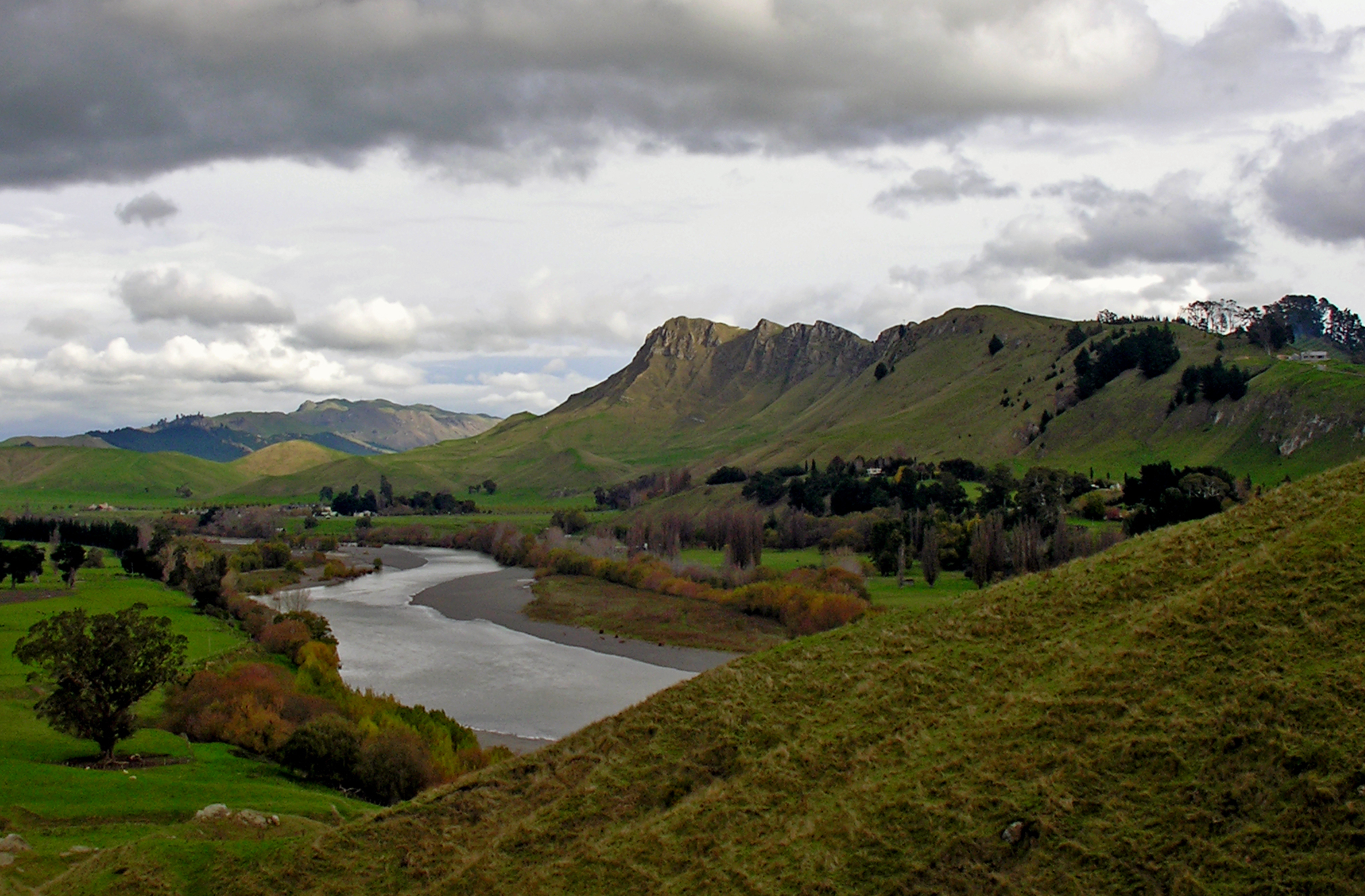
Tukituki River and Te Mata Peak

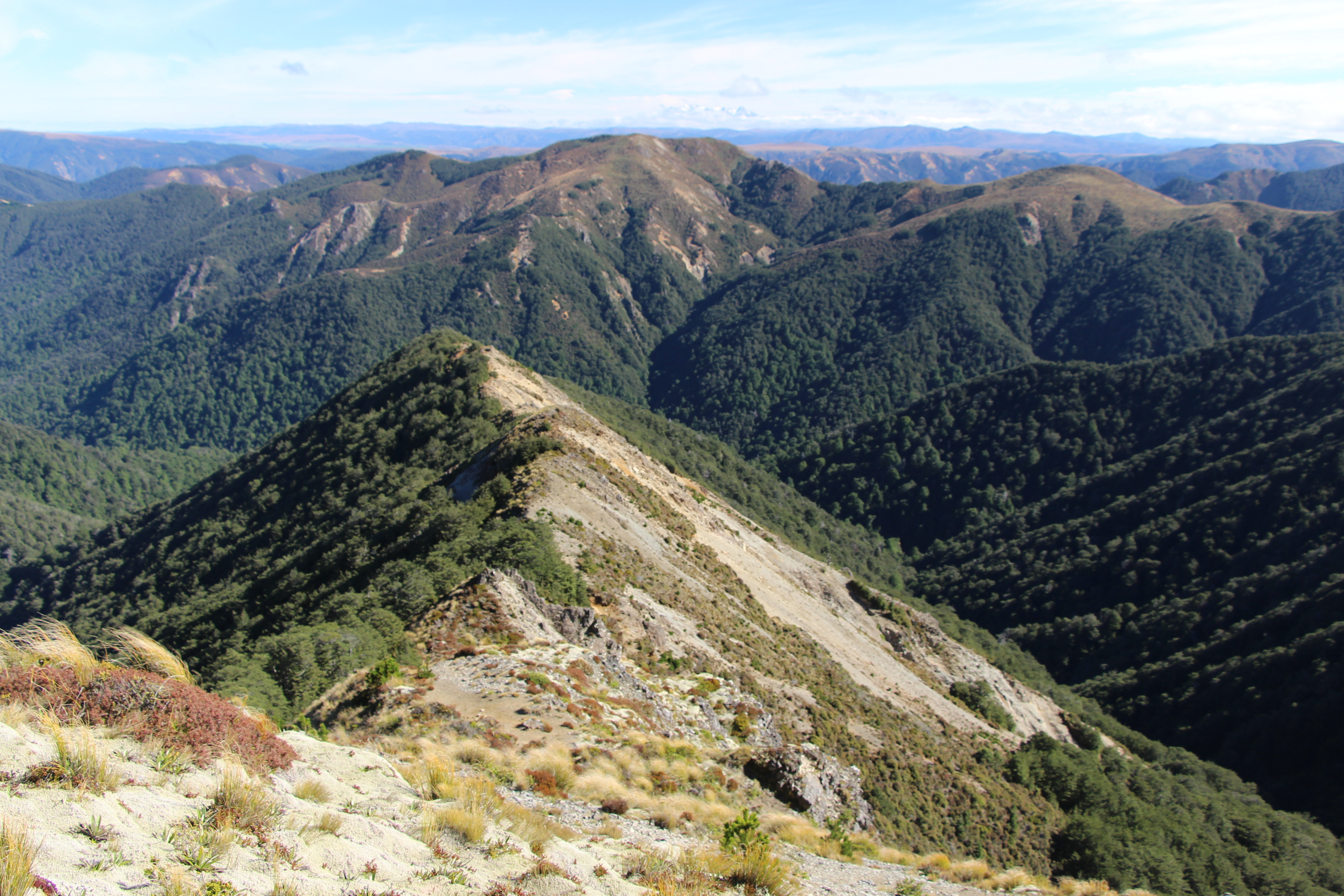
Kaweka Ranges

== Demographics ==
Hawke's Bay Region covers 14,139.05 km^{2} (5,459.12 sq mi) and had an estimated population of 179,700 as of June 2025, 3.4 percent of New Zealand's population, with a population density of 13 people per km^{2}. Around 74 percent of the region's population lives in the Napier-Hastings conurbation.

Historical population
Year	Pop.	±% p.a.
1991	138,342	—
1996	142,791	+0.64%
2001	142,950	+0.02%
2006	147,783	+0.67%
2013	151,179	+0.33%
2018	166,368	+1.93%
2023	175,074	+1.03%

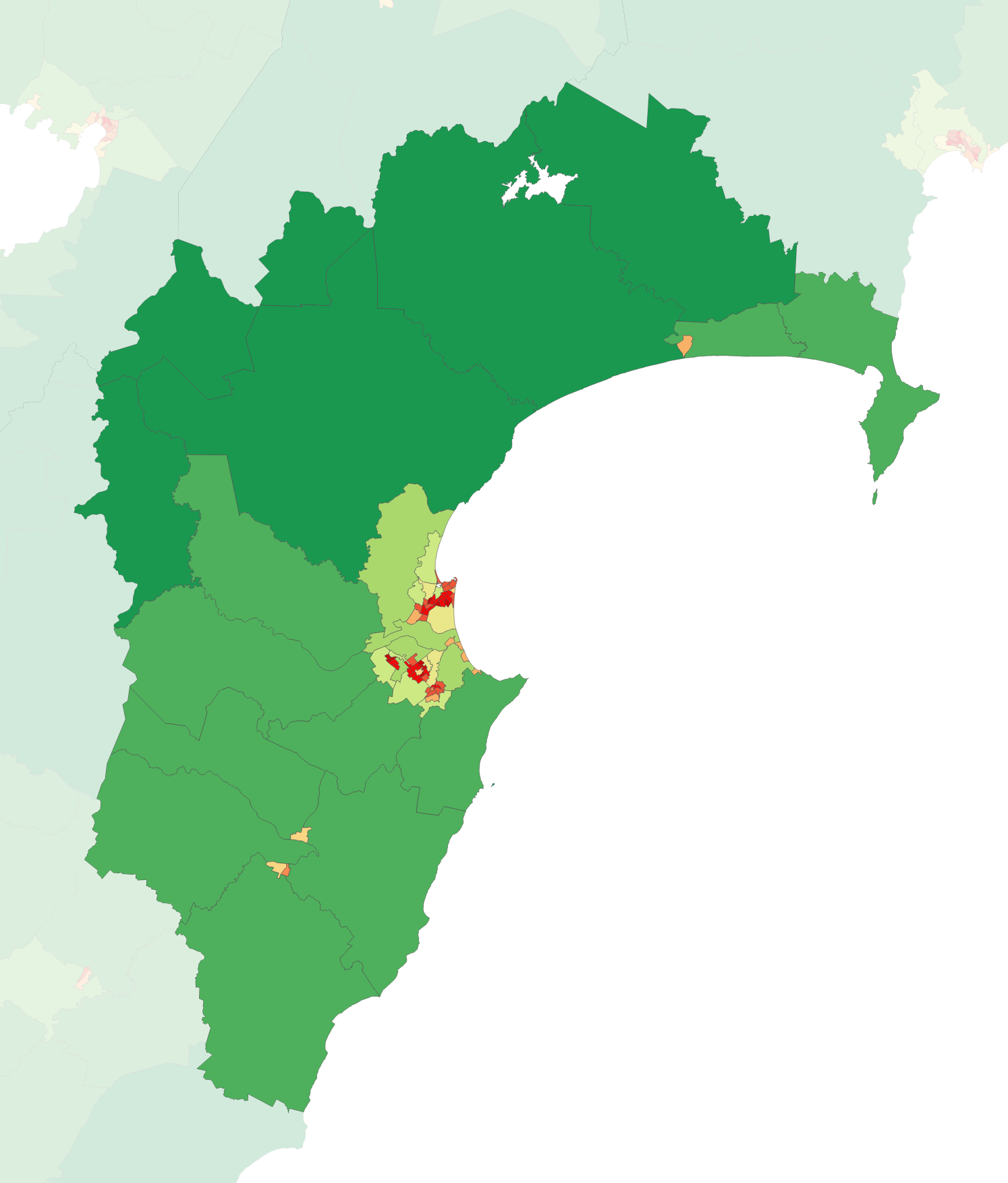
Map of population density in the 2023 census

Hawke's Bay Region had a population of 175,074 in the 2023 New Zealand census, an increase of 8,706 people (5.2%) since the 2018 census, and an increase of 23,895 people (15.8%) since the 2013 census. There were 85,497 males, 89,055 females and 516 people of other genders in 63,735 dwellings. 2.3% of people identified as LGBTIQ+. The median age was 40.4 years (compared with 38.1 years nationally). There were 34,641 people (19.8%) aged under 15 years, 30,249 (17.3%) aged 15 to 29, 76,266 (43.6%) aged 30 to 64, and 33,918 (19.4%) aged 65 or older.

People could identify as more than one ethnicity. The results were 73.3% European (Pākehā); 28.6% Māori; 6.2% Pasifika; 6.5% Asian; 0.8% Middle Eastern, Latin American and African New Zealanders (MELAA); and 2.4% other, which includes people giving their ethnicity as "New Zealander". English was spoken by 96.5%, Māori language by 7.2%, Samoan by 1.9% and other languages by 8.2%. No language could be spoken by 1.9% (e.g. too young to talk). New Zealand Sign Language was known by 0.6%. The percentage of people born overseas was 17.5, compared with 28.8% nationally.

Largest groups of overseas-born residents
Nationality	Population (2018)
England	6,840
Australia	2,625
India	2,076
Samoa	1,665
South Africa	1,473
Philippines	942
Scotland	876
China	765
Netherlands	738
United States	657

The major local Māori tribe is Ngāti Kahungunu.

Religious affiliations were 33.6% Christian, 0.9% Hindu, 0.5% Islam, 3.3% Māori religious beliefs, 0.6% Buddhist, 0.5% New Age, 0.1% Jewish, and 1.7% other religions. People who answered that they had no religion were 52.5%, and 6.5% of people did not answer the census question.

Of those at least 15 years old, 20,490 (14.6%) people had a bachelor's or higher degree, 77,136 (54.9%) had a post-high school certificate or diploma, and 36,423 (25.9%) people exclusively held high school qualifications. The median income was $39,300, compared with $41,500 nationally. 12,315 people (8.8%) earned over $100,000 compared to 12.1% nationally. The employment status of those at least 15 was that 69,846 (49.7%) people were employed full-time, 18,585 (13.2%) were part-time, and 3,948 (2.8%) were unemployed.

Below is a list of urban areas that contain more than 1,000 population.

Urban area	Population (June 2025)	% of region
Napier	66,400	37.0%
Hastings	49,800	27.7%
Havelock North	15,000	8.3%
Waipukurau	4,750	2.6%
Wairoa	4,720	2.6%
Waipawa	2,430	1.4%
Clive	2,040	1.1%
Haumoana	1,160	0.6%

Other towns and settlements in Hawke's Bay include:

- Tuai
- Frasertown
- Nūhaka
- Mahia Beach
- Whirinaki
- Whakatu
- Te Awanga
- Waimārama
- Tikokino
- Ōtāne
- Ongaonga
- Takapau
- Pōrangahau

== Economy ==
The subnational gross domestic product (GDP) of Hawke's Bay was estimated at NZ$8.67 billion in the year to March 2019, 2.9% of New Zealand's national GDP. The regional GDP per capita was estimated at $50,251 in the same period. In the year to March 2018, primary industries contributed $1.14 billion (13.9%) to the regional GDP, goods-producing industries contributed $1.84 billion (22.3%), service industries contributed $4.56 billion (55.3%), and taxes and duties contributed $707 million (8.6%).

=== Agriculture ===
The region is renowned for its horticulture, with large orchards and vineyards on the plains. In the hilly parts of the region sheep and cattle farming predominates, with forestry blocks in the roughest areas.

Hawke's Bay has 17,886 ha (44,200 acres) of horticultural land, the third largest area in New Zealand behind Canterbury and Marlborough. The largest crops by land area are apples (4,750 ha), wine grapes (3,620 ha), squash (3,390 ha), and peas and beans (1,360 ha).

==== Wine ====
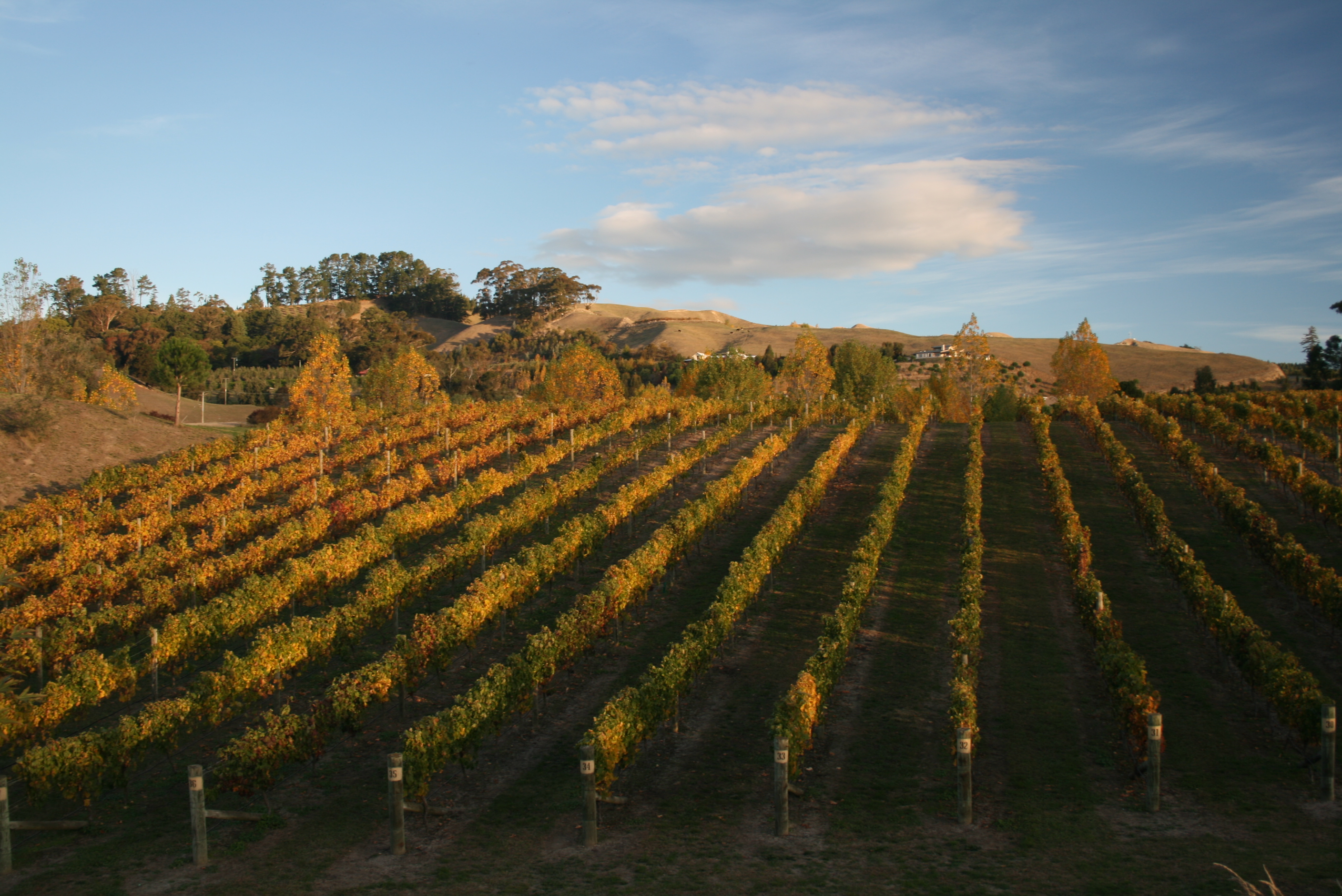
A Hawke's Bay vineyard in autumn

The climate is dry and temperate, and the long, hot summers and cool winters offer excellent weather for growing grapes. Missionaries in the mid 19th century planted the first vines in Hawke's Bay and it is now an important place for full bodied red wines. The wine region is the second largest after the Marlborough wine region, with 4,681 hectares (11,570 acres) of vineyards and 91 operating wineries in 2018.

=== Aerospace ===
Hawke's Bay is home to Rocket Lab's Launch Complex 1, New Zealand's first orbital launch site, on Māhia Peninsula. Wairoa District is home to Space Coast New Zealand, a stretch of coastline from which space launches can be viewed. Rocket Lab launches its Electron rockets several times a year, after its first successful launch of Humanity Star in January 2018.

== Infrastructure ==
=== Air travel ===
Hawke's Bay is served by Hawke's Bay Airport (also known as Napier Airport). 452,000 travellers passed through the terminal in the 12 months to June 2013. This increased to 652,426 in the 12 months to June 2017.

Hastings Aerodrome is a smaller uncontrolled airport in Bridge Pa near Hastings.

=== Roads ===
Inter-regional travel into and out of Hawke's Bay is served by State Highway 2 and State Highway 5, as well as the Taihape-Napier Road also known as "The Gentle Annie". State Highway 38 also connects inter-regionally, although it is less used due to being partially unsealed.

State Highway 2 enters the region coming south from Gisborne, connecting the East Cape region to Hawke's Bay. It continues through Nūhaka and then Wairoa, crossing over the Mohaka River near the Mohaka Viaduct. It then winds through the hills of northern Hawke's Bay, passing by Lake Tūtira. It meets the ocean and then passes through Whirinaki where it intersects with the end of State Highway 5. After cutting by Bay View, it passes by Hawke's Bay Airport as it enters Napier next to Pandora Pond. As it goes through Napier it is concurrent with State Highway 50 passing by Taradale. The Hawke's Bay Expressway forms the next section of the road as it crosses over the Tutaekuri River and Ngaruroro rivers. The road then bisects Hastings and Flaxmere. The road continues through the Heretaunga Plains into Central Hawke's Bay, connecting the towns of Ōtāne, Waipawa, and Waipukurau. It then heads towards Takapau where it meets the other end of State Highway 50. After Takapau it heads into the Tararua District and through the towns of Norsewood and Dannevirke. State Highway 2 is the main route heading south from Napier-Hastings to get to major centres such as Palmerston North and Wellington.

State Highway 5 enters Hawke's Bay from the north-west as the Napier-Taupo Road. It serves as the main connection between Hawke's Bay and the main centres up north – including Auckland, Hamilton, Tauranga, Rotorua, and Taupō. It travels through the hilly interior of the region. It meets up with State Highway 2 after passing through Eskdale.

The Taihape-Napier Road serves as an inland route between Hawke's Bay and the Rangitikei and Ruapehu districts, creating a connection to the towns of Taihape, Waiouru, and Ohakune.

State Highway 50 starts in Ahuriri in Napier and after being concurrent with State Highway 2, splits off and connects the more interior sections of the region – including the settlements of Fernhill, Maraekakaho, Tikokino, Ongaonga, and Ashley Clinton. The road terminates at an intersection with State Highway 2 near Takapau.

== Government ==
=== Regional ===
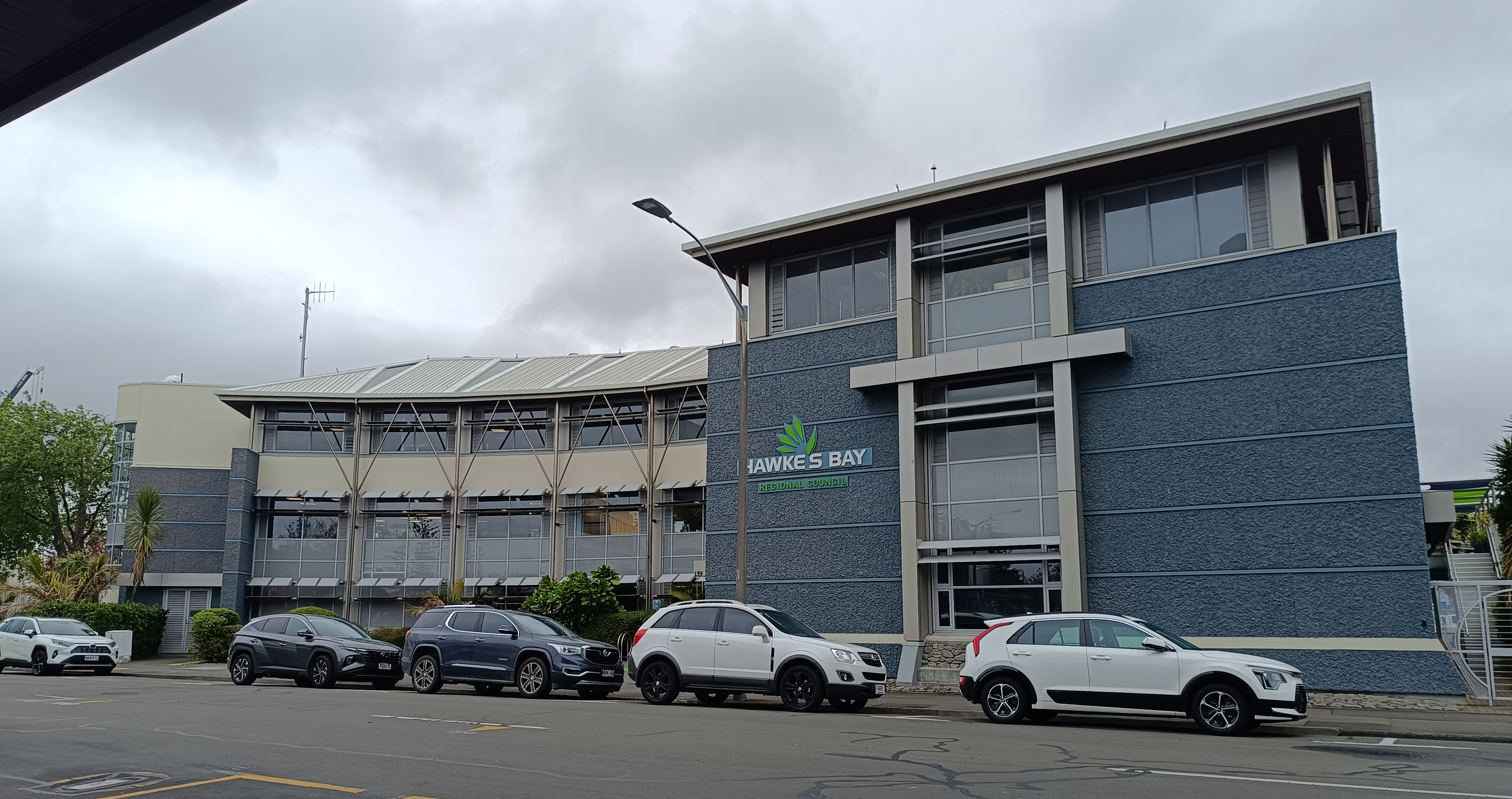
Hawke's Bay Regional Council building in Napier

The region is governed by Hawke's Bay Regional Council, which has its main office and council chamber in Napier. The council consists of eleven elected members and holds elections every three years.

=== Proposal for a unitary authority ===
Between 2013 and 2015 the Local Government Commission considered amalgamating Hawke's Bay Regional Council, its four constituent territorial authorities (Napier City Council, Central Hawke's Bay District Council, Hastings District Council and Wairoa District Council), and the small parts of the Rangitikei District Council (the rural community of Ngamahanga) and Taupo District Council (the rural community of Taharua) that fall within the Hawke's Bay Region into a unitary authority that would hold all local decision-making powers for the region. This proposal was initiated by an application from a group called "A Better Hawke's Bay" and followed the Government-led amalgamation of eight local authorities into the new Auckland Council in 2010 and a 2012 "prosperity study" that found a similar amalgamation in Hawke's Bay could save up to $25m per year. A previous proposal to merge Napier and Hastings, though supported by Hastings residents, was defeated in a public referendum in 1999.

The Local Government Commission released an initial proposal in November 2013. After taking public submissions on the proposal, the Commission issued a final proposal in June 2015. The final proposal was that Hawke's Bay would be governed by a unitary council comprising a governing body (one mayor elected at-large and eighteen councillors elected across five wards) with subsidiary decision-making made by five local boards (each with six to nine elected members).

Under the Local Government Act, the public had the right to demand a binding referendum on whether the amalgamation should proceed; such a demand would be valid if it was signed by at least 10% of the affected electors in one of the affected districts. Two days after the final proposal was issued, a valid referendum demand signed by more than 10% of the affected electors in the Rangitikei district was received (there were only twelve affected electors in that district, therefore only two signatures were required to trigger the poll). The referendum was held by post. Voting concluded on Tuesday 15 September 2015. Because 66% of electors opposed the change, the proposal was defeated and did not progress further. Results broken down to the council level showed that only Hastings district electors favoured amalgamation (52% in favour). Napier (84% opposed), Wairoa District (88% opposed) and Central Hawke's Bay (58%) were opposed. Only four votes were returned from Rangitikei (two each way); no votes were returned from Taupo district.

2015 Hawke's Bay amalgamation referendum
Council area	For		Against		Informal		Blank		Total	Turnout
Hastings District	15,639	51.54%	14,614	48.16%	8	0.03%	84	0.28%	30,345	56.71%.
Napier City	4,632	15.83%	24,553	83.92%	5	0.02%	67	0.23%	29,257	67.29%.
Central Hawke's Bay District	2,629	41.55%	3,684	58.23%	2	0.03%	12	0.19%	6,327	65.50%.
Wairoa District	457	11.62%	3,465	88.12%	0	0.00%	10	0.25%	3,932	69.35%.
Rangitikei District	2	50.00%	2	50.00%	0	0.00%	0	0.00%	4	33.33%.
Taupō District	0	0.00%	0	0.00%	0	0.00%	0	0.00%	0	0.00%
Total	23,359	33.43%	46,318	66.30%	15	0.02%	173	0.25%	69,865	62.18%

=== Local ===
Territorial authorities map of Hawke's Bay

Local government is organised into territorial authorities areas, consisting of Hastings District, Wairoa District, Central Hawke's Bay District, and Napier City. The localities of Taharua in the Taupō District and Ngamatea in the Rangitikei District are also within the boundaries of the region. It does not include the Tararua District, Dannevirke, Woodville or Norsewood, which have been under the Manawatū-Whanganui Regional Council (also known as Horizons Regional Council) since the 1989 local government reforms.

District	Mayor	Year Elected
Central Hawke's Bay	Will Foley	2025
Hastings	Wendy Schollum	2025
Napier	Richard McGrath	2025
Wairoa	Craig Little	2013

=== National ===
Hawke's Bay is covered by five general electorates – namely Napier, Tukituki, Wairarapa, Rangitīkei, and Taupō. The bulk of the region is contained within the Napier and Tukituki electorates, the former comprising most of the northern part of the region (including Napier and Wairoa), whilst the latter comprises much of the central parts of the region and the area around Hastings, including Havelock North and Clive. Wairarapa, which extends across parts of Greater Wellington and Manawatū-Whanganui, includes much of Central Hawke's Bay District, including Waipukurau and Waipawa. The Rangitīkei and Taupō electorates do not contain much of any population within the region.

Napier and Tukituki are often called 'bellwether' electorates. Since the introduction of Mixed-Member Proportional elections in New Zealand, both electorates have been held by both Labour and National members of parliament, often shifting in a way similar to that of the nation as a whole.

Hawke's Bay is also covered by three Māori electorates – namely Ikaroa-Rāwhiti, Waiariki, and Te Tai Hauāuru. The vast majority of the population of the region is within the Ikaroa-Rāwhiti electorate.

Current state of the main electorates in the region
Electorate	Main centres	MP	First elected
Napier	Napier, Wairoa	Kate Nimon	2023
Tukituki	Hastings, Havelock North, Clive	Catherine Wedd	2023
Wairarapa	Waipukurau, Waipawa	Mike Butterick	2023
Ikaroa-Rāwhiti	All	Cushla Tangaere-Manuel	2023

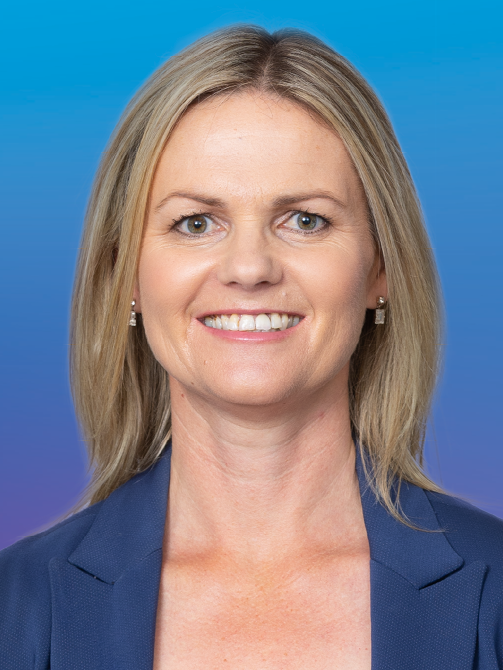
Catherine Wedd

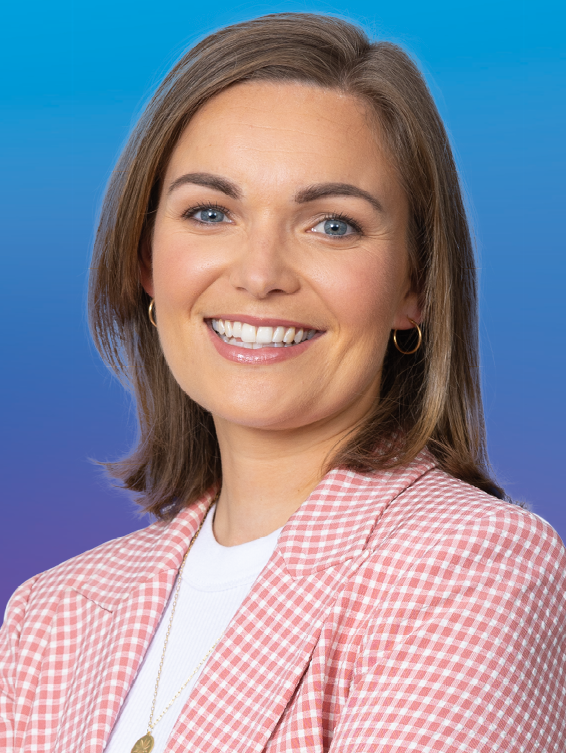
Katie Nimon

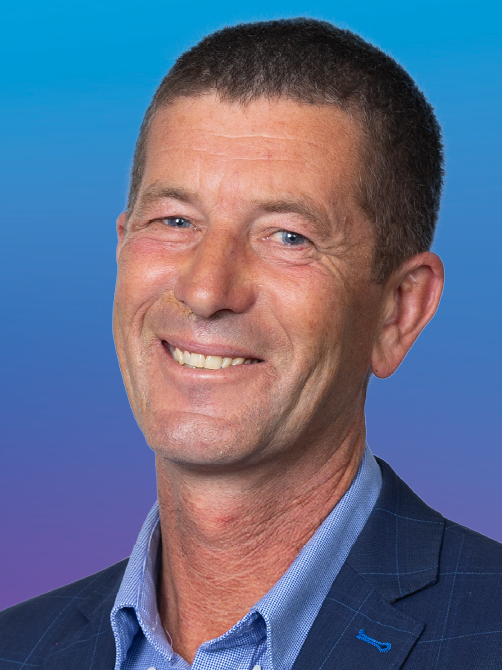
Mike Butterick

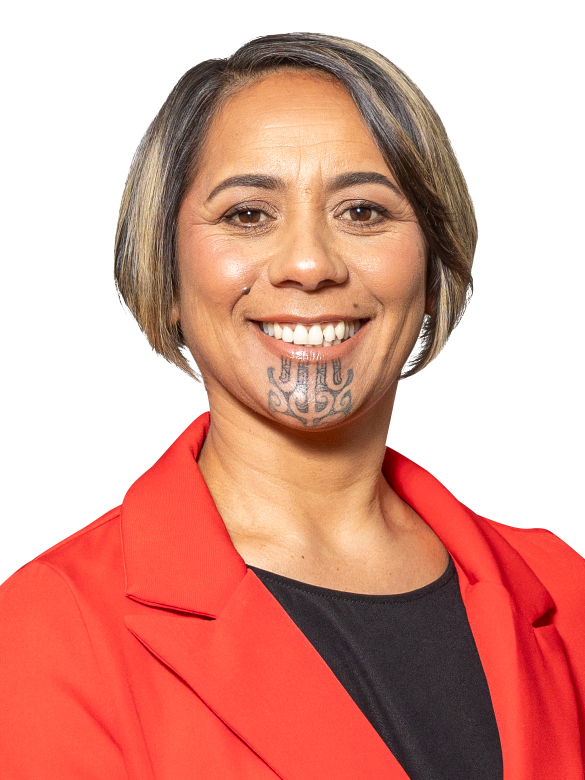
Cushla Tangaere-Manuel

== Culture and lifestyle ==
=== Hawke's Bay Anniversary Day ===
Hawke's Bay Anniversary Day is an annual day of celebration held on the Friday before Labour Day. It is celebrated throughout the old provincial boundaries of Hawke's Bay.

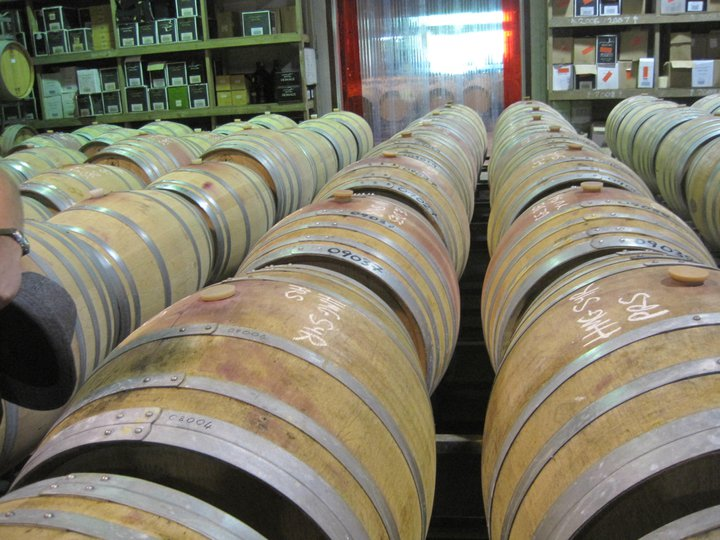
Inside a Hawke's Bay winery

=== Media ===
The Hawke's Bay radio market is the seventh-largest in New Zealand, with 142,200 listeners aged 10 and over. The largest commercial stations by share as of May 2025 are Newstalk ZB (14.8%), Magic (12.4%), The Breeze (10.6%), The Rock (10.0%), and The Hits (9.8%).

The region is served by a variety of radio stations including Radio Kahungunu, The Hits 89.5, More FM, access station Radio Hawke's Bay (formally Radio Kidnappers) and local station Bay FM. As well, most of the national commercial and non-commercial operators have transmitters covering the region.

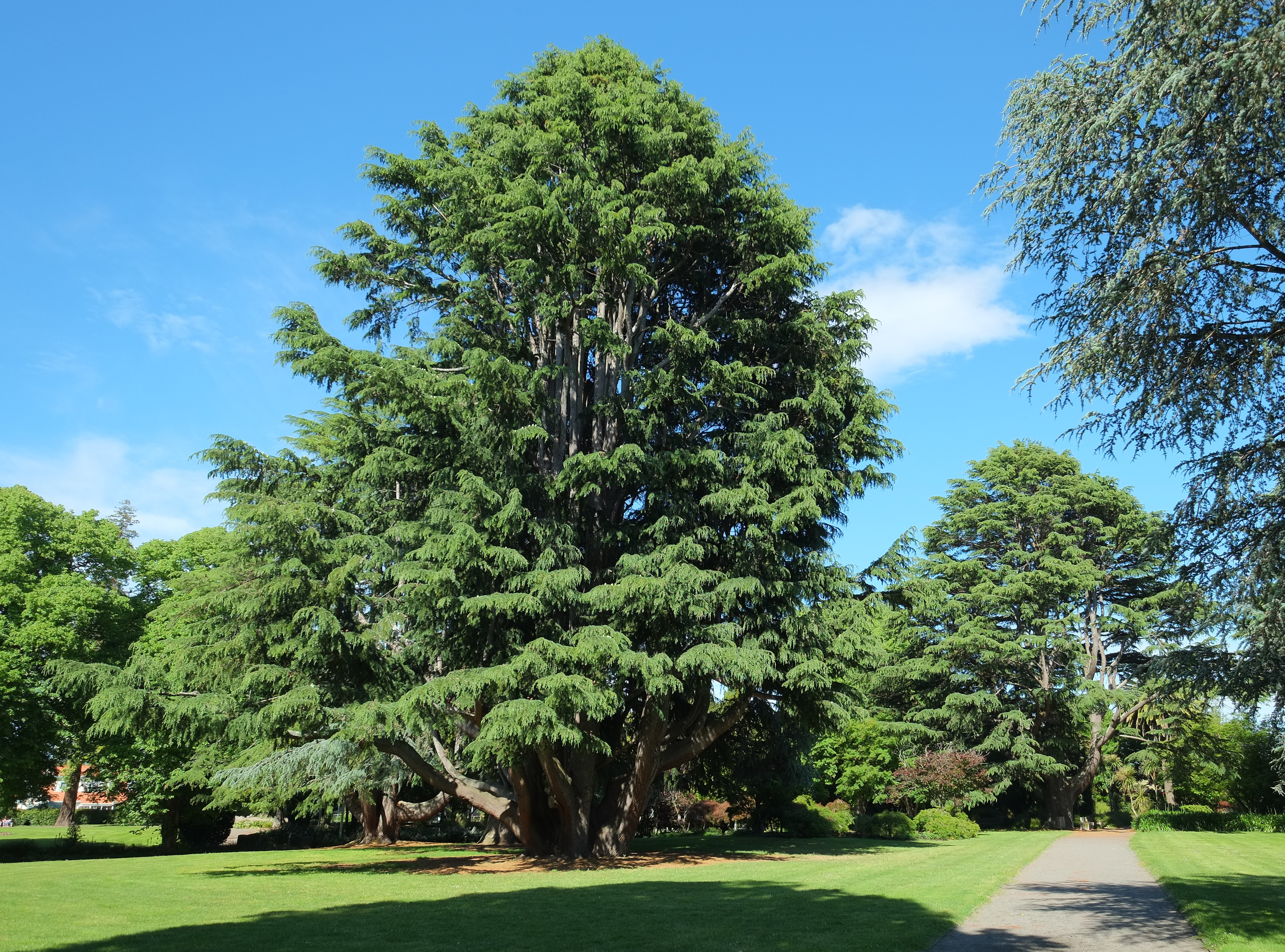
Himalayan cedar in Cornwall Park

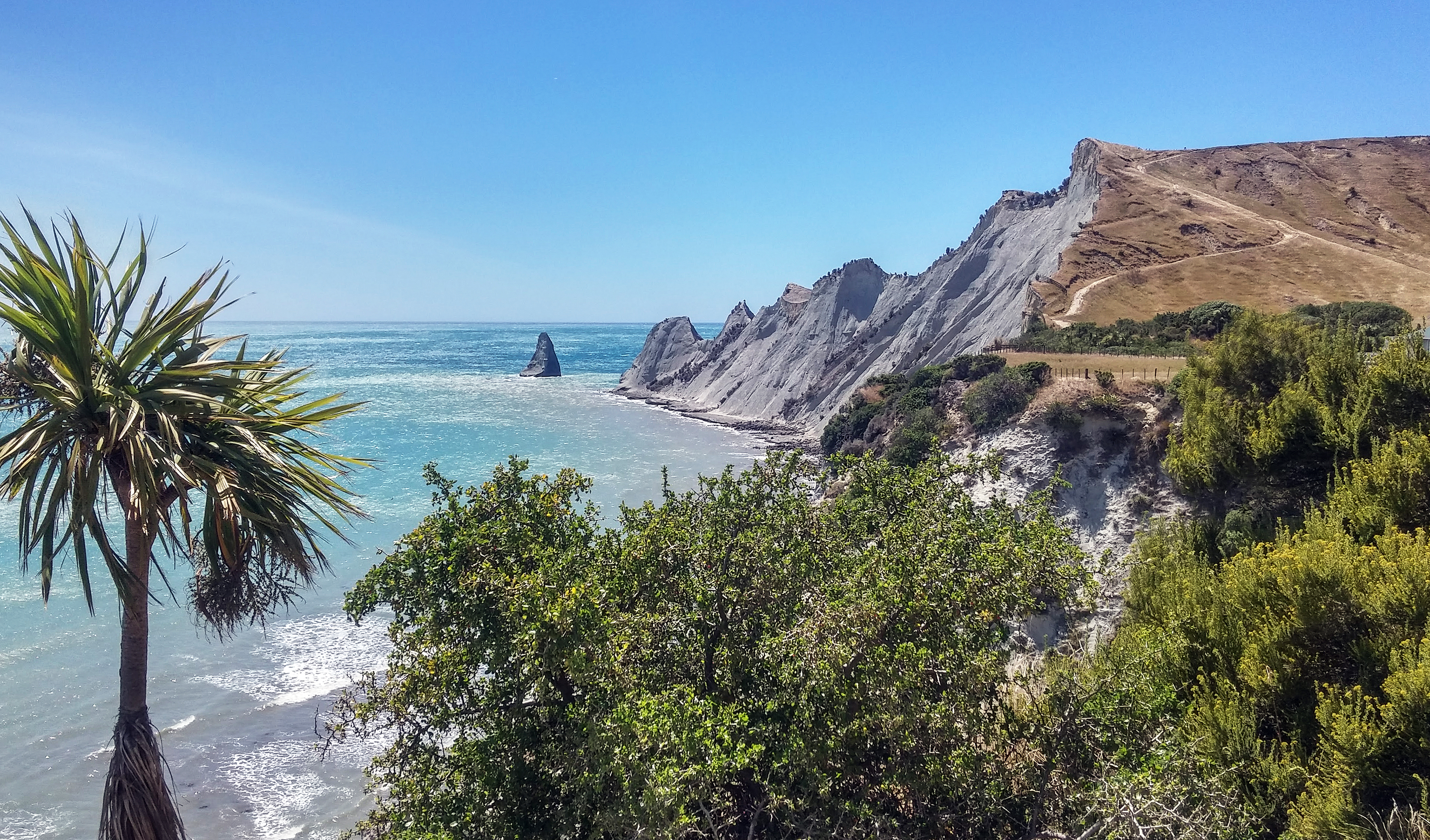
Cape Kidnappers

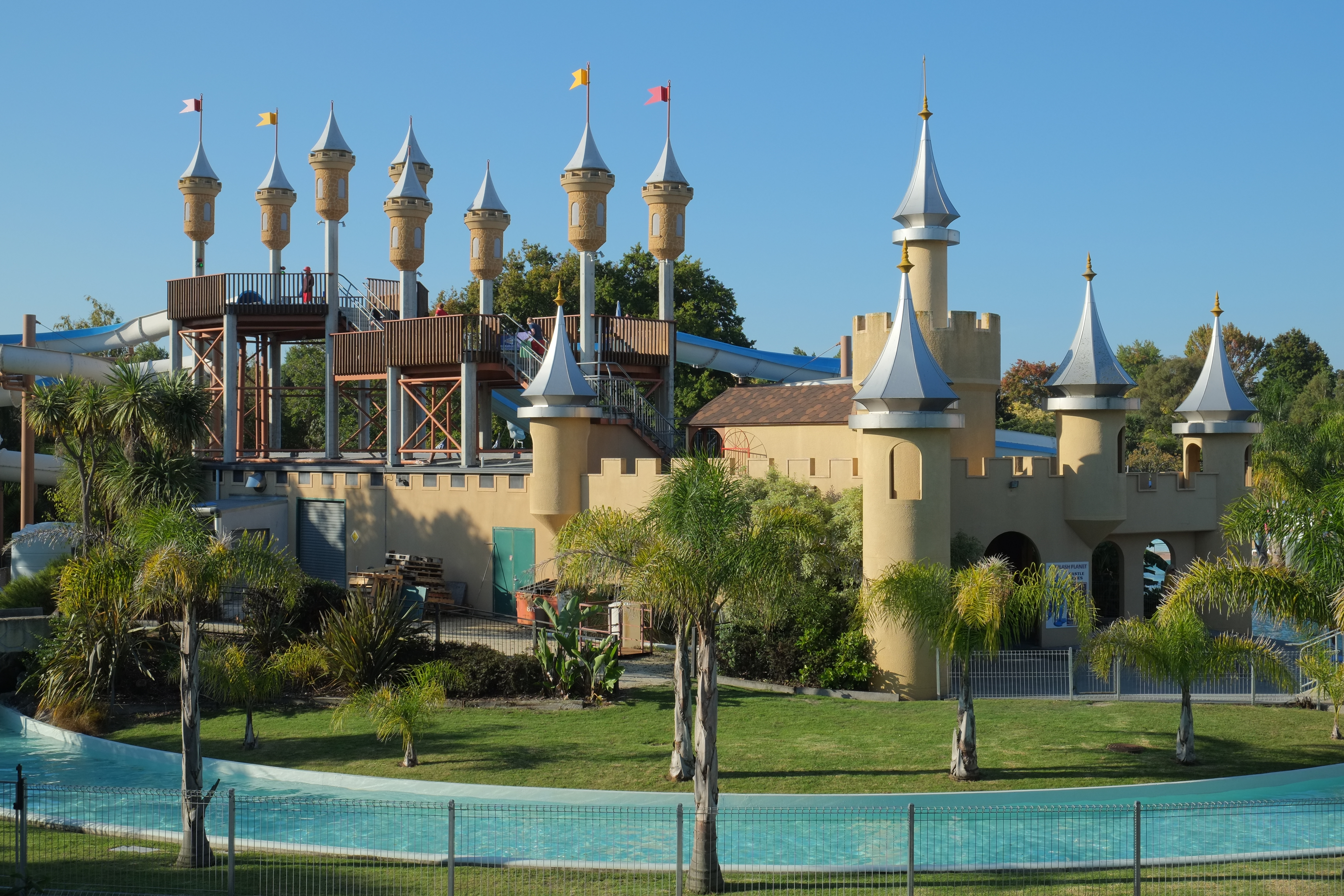
Splash Planet

=== Parks and nature ===
Hawke's Bay is home to numerous parks, forests, beaches and various other natural attractions.

Napier and Hastings are home to many parks, with major parks including Cornwall, Frimley, and Windsor Parks in Hastings, and Anderson Park, Park Island, Taradale Park and the Botanical Gardens in Napier.

Located in Windsor Park is Splash Planet, an amusement and water park that is open in the summer.

Cape Kidnappers, a headland at the south-eastern extremity of Hawke Bay, is a popular tourist attraction. The cape has been identified as an Important Bird Area due to being a breeding site for over 6500 pairs of Australasian gannets.

=== Food ===
The Hawke's Bay wine region produces some of New Zealand's finest wines, celebrated together with local cuisine twice a year with the Food And Wine Classic festivals. These take place over several weekends in winter and ten days in summer, attracting thousands of visitors, many from overseas.

=== Music ===
Napier is home to the Mission Concert held early each year since 1993. The event, held at the Mission Estate Winery in Taradale, has attracted performers such as Kenny Rogers, Elton John, Shirley Bassey, Rod Stewart, The B-52's, Belinda Carlisle, Ray Charles, and Eric Clapton. The 2009 concert attraction was to be Lionel Richie, but the concert was cancelled because of rain.

UK music artist Tycho Jones was staying in Hastings, Hawkes Bay when he was inspired to write the track Don't Be Afraid, produced by Jonathan Quarmby.

=== Sport ===
The Hawke's Bay Rugby Union's representative team, the Magpies, plays in New Zealand's annual professional domestic rugby union competition, the Mitre 10 Cup. The team represents the Hawke's Bay Region in provincial representative rugby, and draws its players from the constituent clubs who are affiliated to the provincial union. The team play their home matches in McLean Park in Napier. Players representing Hawke's Bay are also eligible to play for the Hurricanes in the annual transnational Super Rugby competition. Hawke's Bay has produced a number of All Blacks.

The Hawke's Bay Hawks compete in the New Zealand National Basketball League.

== Seismicity ==
Hawke's Bay is one of the most seismically active regions in New Zealand and has experienced many large and often damaging earthquakes. More than 50 damaging earthquakes have been recorded in the region since the 1800s.

Date	Location	Magnitude (ML)	Depth	Fatalities	More information
8 Jul 1843	25 km west of Tikokino	7.6	12 km	2	
22 Feb 1863	Waipukurau	7.5	25 km		1863 Hawke's Bay earthquake
14 Sep 1875	Māhia Peninsula	5.8	25 km		
9 Aug 1904	Pōrangahau	7.0	16 km		
28 Jun 1921	Kaweka Forest Park	6.7	80 km		
12 Feb 1930	Pōrangahau	6.2	33 km		
3 Feb 1931	20 km north of Napier	7.8	20 km	256	1931 Hawke's Bay earthquake
3 Feb 1931	25 km north east of Napier	5.8	25 km		
8 Feb 1931	Wairoa	6.4	60 km		
13 Feb 1931	50 km east of Napier	7.3	30 km		
5 May 1932	50 km east of Napier	5.9	12 km		
16 Sep 1932	Wairoa	6.9	12 km		
5 Mar 1934	Pongaroa	7.2	12 km		
15 Mar 1934	Wairoa	6.3	25 km		
26 Feb 1940	Hastings	6.0	25 km		
1 Mar 1950	Lake Waikaremoana	5.8	60 km		
10 Feb 1951	Pōrangahau	6.2	33 km		
6 Oct 1980	Hastings	5.7	30 km		
19 Feb 1990	Pōrangahau	6.2	34 km		
13 May 1990	Pōrangahau	6.4	30 km		
