= Ocean Beach, Hawke's Bay =

Ocean Beach Waipuka
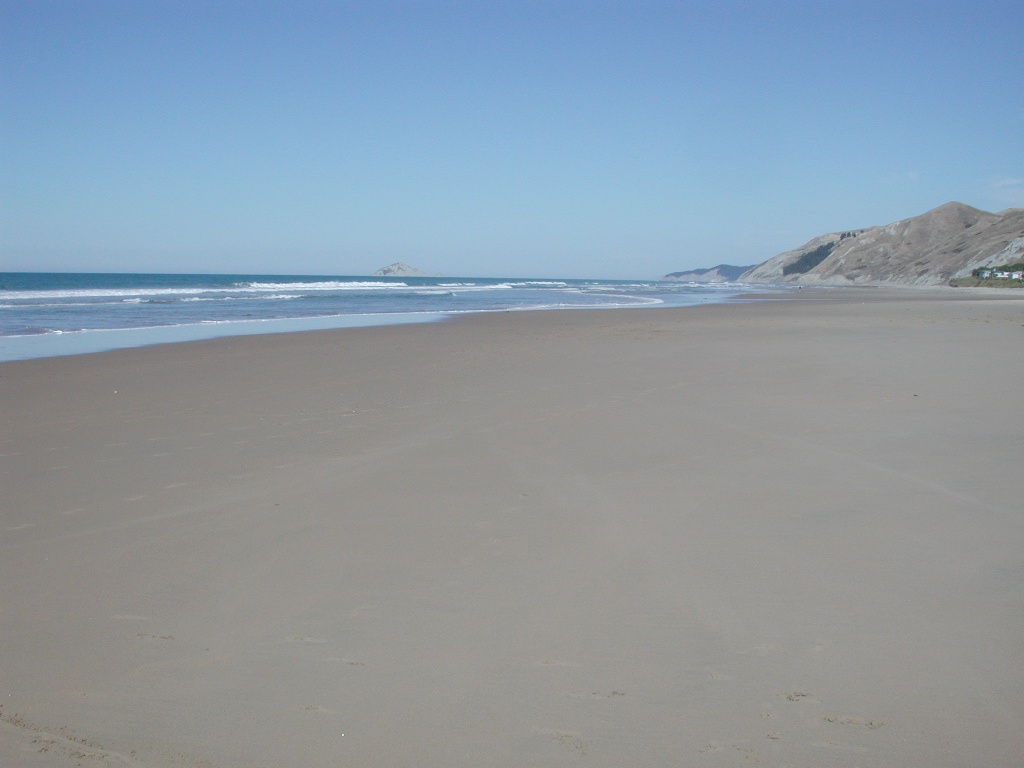
- Ocean Beach
- Interactive map of Ocean Beach
- Coordinates: 39.744°S 177.01°E
- Country: New Zealand
- Region: Hawke's Bay
- Territorial authority: Hastings District
- Ward: Kahurānaki General Ward; Takitimu Māori Ward
- Community: Hastings District Rural Community
- Subdivision: Poukawa Subdivision
- Electorates: Tukituki; Ikaroa-Rāwhiti (Māori)

Government
  - Territorial Authority: Hastings District Council
  - Regional council: Hawke's Bay Regional Council
  - Mayor of Hastings: Wendy Schollum
  - Tukituki MP: Catherine Wedd
  - Ikaroa-Rāwhiti MP: Cushla Tangaere-Manuel

Area
  - Total: 82.53 km^{2} (31.87 sq mi)

Population (2023 Census)
  - Total: 378
  - Density: 4.58/km^{2} (11.9/sq mi)

Ocean Beach is a long beach of golden sand in the Hastings District of the Hawke's Bay Region, on the east coast of New Zealand. It lies between Cape Kidnappers to the north, and Waimarama Beach to the south. Local Māori know it also as Waipuka. Visitors, mainly Hawke's Bay locals, enjoy it as a seaside recreational beach. Ocean Beach has few roads – only the road to it from Havelock North, and some others branching off to a few houses.

Ocean Beach has a strong rip current and usually has large strong waves and is therefore popular with surfers. The beach has surf life-saving patrols running all through summer. Behind the sandy beachfront are the Haupouri Flats, an area of farm pasture. The land behind that is very hilly and the one-way road going down to the beach is steep. A river formed by runoff from farmland flows onto the beach and creates features that vary often, from a river going straight into the sea, to a delta, a lake, or a lagoon. Sometimes beachgoers create canals from these lakes and rivers to the sea.

On 13 March 2006, leaked documents between Hastings District Mayor Lawrence Yule and a syndicate of developers that approved of over 500 houses and new roading to be built in Ocean Beach. The area mainly owned by Māori was to become a town and residents were outraged. There was a dispute between Hastings authorities and residents over the new constructions. Many developments have been proposed on the area dating back to 1995 and have been rejected by locals.

== Demographics ==
Ocean Beach and its surrounds cover 82.53 km^{2} (31.87 sq mi). It is part of the larger Poukawa statistical area.

Historical population
Year	Pop.	±% p.a.
2006	234	—
2013	258	+1.40%
2018	300	+3.06%
2023	378	+4.73%
The 2006 population is for a larger area of 102.65 km^{2}. Source:

Ocean Beach had a population of 378 in the 2023 New Zealand census, an increase of 78 people (26.0%) since the 2018 census, and an increase of 120 people (46.5%) since the 2013 census. There were 174 males and 204 females in 141 dwellings. 2.4% of people identified as LGBTIQ+. There were 75 people (19.8%) aged under 15 years, 42 (11.1%) aged 15 to 29, 192 (50.8%) aged 30 to 64, and 66 (17.5%) aged 65 or older.

People could identify as more than one ethnicity. The results were 77.0% European (Pākehā), 28.6% Māori, 2.4% Pasifika, 0.8% Asian, and 1.6% other, which includes people giving their ethnicity as "New Zealander". English was spoken by 98.4%, Māori by 11.9%, Samoan by 0.8%, and other languages by 3.2%. No language could be spoken by 0.8% (e.g. too young to talk). New Zealand Sign Language was known by 0.8%. The percentage of people born overseas was 19.8, compared with 28.8% nationally.

Religious affiliations were 36.5% Christian, 6.3% Māori religious beliefs, and 0.8% New Age. People who answered that they had no religion were 50.0%, and 4.8% of people did not answer the census question.

Of those at least 15 years old, 75 (24.8%) people had a bachelor's or higher degree, 159 (52.5%) had a post-high school certificate or diploma, and 72 (23.8%) people exclusively held high school qualifications. 39 people (12.9%) earned over $100,000 compared to 12.1% nationally. The employment status of those at least 15 was 156 (51.5%) full-time, 57 (18.8%) part-time, and 9 (3.0%) unemployed.
