= Anna Lorck =

New Zealand politician

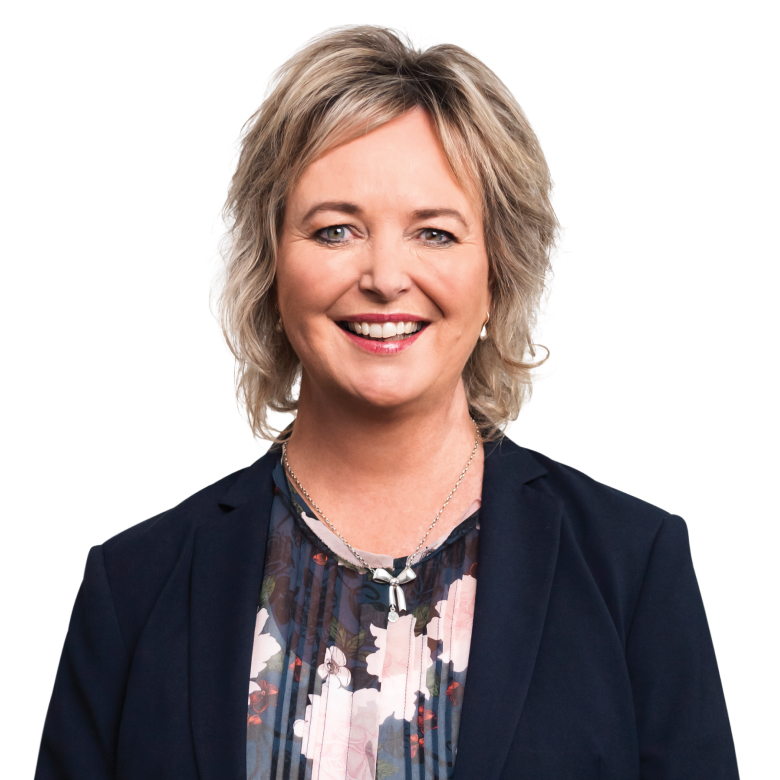
- Lorck in 2023

Member of the New Zealand Parliament for Tukituki
- In office 17 October 2020 – 14 October 2023
- Preceded by: Lawrence Yule
- Succeeded by: Catherine Wedd

Personal details
- Party: Labour
- Spouse: Damon Harvey
- Children: 5
- Profession: Business owner

Anna Louise Lorck is a New Zealand politician of the Labour Party. She served in the New Zealand House of Representatives as the MP for Tukituki from 2020 to 2023.

== Early life and career ==
Lorck grew up in Waipukurau and trained as a journalist. Before entering parliament, she owned a public relations company.

== Hawkes' Bay District Health Board ==
Before standing as a Labour Party candidate, Lorck, who had vocally opposed Labour sacking the Hawke's Bay District Health Board (DHB), volunteered to phone canvass to motivate voter turnout for two hours for the National Party. She was never a member of the party.

In 2019 Lorck was elected to the Hawke's Bay DHB, as the highest polling new candidate. She served as part of the governance of the region's response to COVID-19. Lorck advocates for a local cardiology centre, costed at $15 million, to enable life-saving surgery locally.

== Political career ==
=== Labour parliamentary candidate, 2014–2020 ===
New Zealand Parliament
Years	Term	Electorate	List	Party
2020–2023	53rd	Tukituki	none	Labour

At the 2014 election, Lorck, a Hastings business woman, stood as a candidate in the Tukituki electorate for the Labour Party, and did not stand on the Labour list. As a first time candidate she made significant progress into the margin against incumbent National Party MP Craig Foss, and announced she would stand again at the 2017 election. She was ranked 46 on the Labour party list.

During a tightly fought contest, in July 2017 a complaint by a right-wing blogger, was made against Lorck to the Advertising Standards Authority over her billboard wording of "Your Local MP". Lorck responded by stating the intention of the message was to convey that she lived in the Tukituki electorate while National candidate Lawrence Yule lived in neighboring Napier. Lorck again made significant inroads into the majority but was not elected, nor ranked high enough on the Labour list to be elected to Parliament.

At the 2020 general election, Lorck was selected as the Labour candidate for Tukituki for the third time. She was given the Labour Party's endorsement to run a local MP campaign and consequently was not on the party list. This time she unseated Yule by a margin of 1590 votes, returning the electorate to Labour for the first time since 2002.

=== Member of Parliament ===
In August 2022, a former senior staffer within the New Zealand Parliament alleged that Lorck had bullied her, and that Lorck had been through three executive assistants in a year and a half. In September 2022, a second former staffer made allegations of bullying including "persistent scolding" against Lorck. In response to media coverage, Lorck confirmed that she was undergoing leadership training and claimed that she had never received complaints of bullying from the staffer during their employment period.

During the 2023 New Zealand general election, Lorck was unseated by National Party candidate Catherine Wedd, who won by a margin of 10,118 votes.

=== Hawke’s Bay Power Consumers Trust ===
In 2024, Lorck stood for election to the Hawke's Bay Power Consumers Trust Board but was not elected, receiving the fewest votes among the candidates.

== Personal life ==
Lorck is married to former Hastings District Councillor Damon Harvey. They have a blended family of five children.

New Zealand Parliament
Preceded by Lawrence Yule	Member of Parliament for Tukituki; 2020–2023	Succeeded by Catherine Wedd
