= Waimārama =

Settlement in Hawke's Bay Region, New Zealand

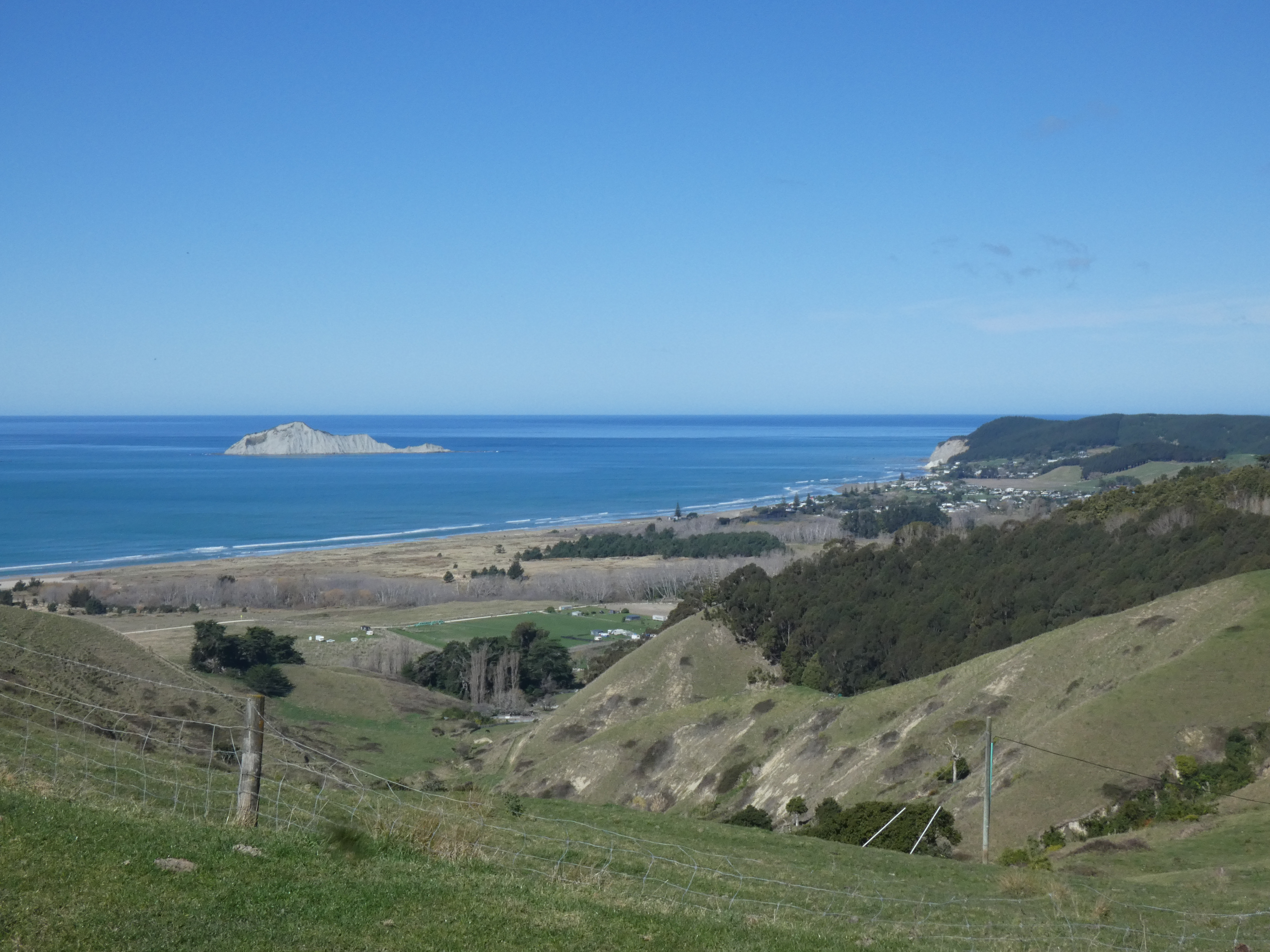
- Waimārama and Te Motu-o-Kura / Bare Island viewed from lookout point near road entrance to the village
- Interactive map of Waimārama
- Coordinates: 39°48′58″S 176°59′24″E
- Country: New Zealand
- Region: Hawke's Bay
- Territorial authority: Hastings District
- Ward: Kahurānaki general ward; Takitimu Māori ward
- Electorates: Tukituki; Ikaroa-Rāwhiti (Māori)

Government
  - Territorial Authority: Hastings District Council
  - Regional council: Hawke's Bay Regional Council
  - Mayor of Hastings: Wendy Schollum
  - Tukituki MP: Catherine Wedd
  - Ikaroa-Rāwhiti MP: Cushla Tangaere-Manuel

Area
  - Total: 1.63 km^{2} (0.63 sq mi)

Population (June 2025)
  - Total: 210
  - Density: 130/km^{2} (330/sq mi)
- Postcode(s): 4294

Waimārama is a seaside village in Hastings District, Hawke's Bay, New Zealand.

Waimārama is a popular surf beach, known as a beach break on a sandy beach, with a rocky point. It offers both left and right handers and conditions are often suitable for surfers of all levels. The beach has strong rip currents, and is patrolled by surf lifeguards at weekends from November to March.

Motu-o-Kura or Bare Island is located just off the coast and is a popular spot for fishing and diving. The beach town attracts people from across the region, with a restaurant, bar and shop. It also has about 240 permanent residents, with many former holiday baches becoming homes.

On 28 April 2011, heavy rain hit the village, causing floods and mudslides.

== Demographics ==
Statistics New Zealand describes Waimārama as a rural settlement, which covers 1.63 km^{2} (0.63 sq mi). It had an estimated population of 210 as of June 2025, with a population density of 129 people per km^{2}. It is part of the larger Kahuranaki statistical area.

Historical population for Waimārama
| Year | Pop. | ±% p.a. |
|---|---|---|
| 2006 | 222 | — |
| 2013 | 183 | −2.72% |
| 2018 | 216 | +3.37% |
| 2023 | 210 | −0.56% |

Waimārama had a population of 210 in the 2023 New Zealand census, a decrease of 6 people (−2.8%) since the 2018 census, and an increase of 27 people (14.8%) since the 2013 census. There were 114 males and 96 females in 87 dwellings. 1.4% of people identified as LGBTIQ+. The median age was 53.7 years (compared with 38.1 years nationally). There were 30 people (14.3%) aged under 15 years, 24 (11.4%) aged 15 to 29, 93 (44.3%) aged 30 to 64, and 66 (31.4%) aged 65 or older.

People could identify as more than one ethnicity. The results were 82.9% European (Pākehā), 31.4% Māori, 4.3% Pasifika, 1.4% Asian, and 2.9% other, which includes people giving their ethnicity as "New Zealander". English was spoken by 98.6%, Māori by 14.3%, Samoan by 1.4%, and other languages by 4.3%. New Zealand Sign Language was known by 4.3%. The percentage of people born overseas was 5.7, compared with 28.8% nationally.

Religious affiliations were 37.1% Christian, 2.9% Māori religious beliefs, and 1.4% New Age. People who answered that they had no religion were 54.3%, and 7.1% of people did not answer the census question.

Of those at least 15 years old, 39 (21.7%) people had a bachelor's or higher degree, 99 (55.0%) had a post-high school certificate or diploma, and 42 (23.3%) people exclusively held high school qualifications. The median income was $39,900, compared with $41,500 nationally. 21 people (11.7%) earned over $100,000 compared to 12.1% nationally. The employment status of those at least 15 was 78 (43.3%) full-time, 24 (13.3%) part-time, and 6 (3.3%) unemployed.

=== Kahuranaki statistical area ===
Kahuranaki statistical area covers 372.64 km^{2} (143.88 sq mi) and had an estimated population of 1,590 as of June 2025, with a population density of 4.3 people per km^{2}.

Historical population for Kahuranaki
| Year | Pop. | ±% p.a. |
|---|---|---|
| 2006 | 1,104 | — |
| 2013 | 1,152 | +0.61% |
| 2018 | 1,392 | +3.86% |
| 2023 | 1,539 | +2.03% |
The 2006 population is for a smaller area of 367.96 km^{2}. Source:

Kahuranaki had a population of 1,539 in the 2023 New Zealand census, an increase of 147 people (10.6%) since the 2018 census, and an increase of 387 people (33.6%) since the 2013 census. There were 765 males, 771 females, and 3 people of other genders in 558 dwellings. 2.1% of people identified as LGBTIQ+. The median age was 45.0 years (compared with 38.1 years nationally). There were 303 people (19.7%) aged under 15 years, 219 (14.2%) aged 15 to 29, 756 (49.1%) aged 30 to 64, and 261 (17.0%) aged 65 or older.

People could identify as more than one ethnicity. The results were 86.2% European (Pākehā); 22.2% Māori; 1.9% Pasifika; 0.6% Asian; 0.4% Middle Eastern, Latin American and African New Zealanders (MELAA); and 3.3% other, which includes people giving their ethnicity as "New Zealander". English was spoken by 98.2%, Māori by 7.6%, Samoan by 0.6%, and other languages by 6.6%. No language could be spoken by 1.4% (e.g. too young to talk). New Zealand Sign Language was known by 1.8%. The percentage of people born overseas was 20.7, compared with 28.8% nationally.

Religious affiliations were 32.2% Christian, 2.7% Māori religious beliefs, 0.2% Buddhist, 1.4% New Age, and 0.4% other religions. People who answered that they had no religion were 56.1%, and 7.0% of people did not answer the census question.

Of those at least 15 years old, 342 (27.7%) people had a bachelor's or higher degree, 660 (53.4%) had a post-high school certificate or diploma, and 225 (18.2%) people exclusively held high school qualifications. The median income was $41,900, compared with $41,500 nationally. 180 people (14.6%) earned over $100,000 compared to 12.1% nationally. The employment status of those at least 15 was 624 (50.5%) full-time, 225 (18.2%) part-time, and 36 (2.9%) unemployed.

== Marae ==
The local Waimārama Marae and Taupunga meeting house is a meeting place for the Ngāti Kahungunu hapū of Ngāti Hikatoa, Ngāti Kurukuru, Ngāti Urakiterangi and Ngāti Whakaiti.

In October 2020, the Government committed $6,020,910 from the Provincial Growth Fund to upgrade a group of 18 marae, including Waimārama Marae. The funding was expected to create 39 jobs.

== Education ==
Waimārama School is a co-educational state primary school, with a roll of 13 as of July 2026. The school started in 1906.
