= Lawrence Yule =

New Zealand politician (born 1963)

Lawrence Yule JP
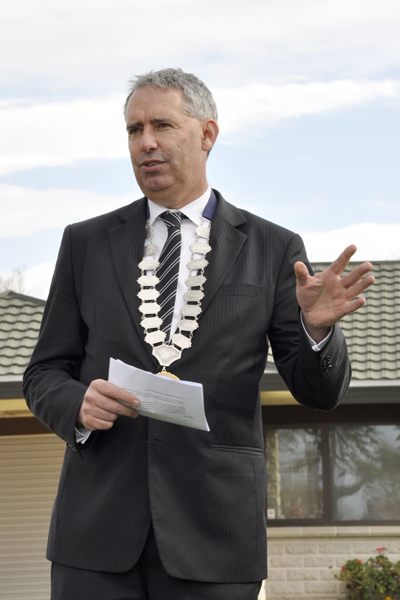

Member of the New Zealand Parliament for Tukituki
- In office 23 September 2017 – 17 October 2020
- Preceded by: Craig Foss
- Succeeded by: Anna Lorck

Mayor of Hastings
- In office 2001–2017
- Preceded by: Jeremy Dwyer
- Succeeded by: Sandra Hazlehurst

Personal details
- Born: 1963 (age 62–63)
- Party: National
- Spouse: Kerryn (wife)

Lawrence Arden Yule (born 1963) is a New Zealand politician. He was Mayor of Hastings from 2001 to 2017, and a Member of Parliament representing the Tukituki electorate for the National Party from 2017 to 2020.

== Political career ==
=== Mayor of Hastings ===
Yule became mayor of Hastings in 2001. In this role he presided over the Hastings District Council. When elected he was the youngest person to become mayor of Hastings.

In 2016, the Hastings district was hit by an outbreak of campylobacter in drinking water which affected thousands of people.

In the last mayoral election he stood in, in 2016, Yule received more than 3,000 more votes than his closest rival. Yule announced that his sixth term, starting in 2016, would be his last as mayor.

=== National politics ===
New Zealand Parliament
Years	Term	Electorate	List	Party
2017–2020	52nd	Tukituki	67	National

After National MP Craig Foss announced his retirement from politics in December 2016. Yule announced his intention to be selected as the National Party candidate for the electorate of Tukituki and in February 2017, he was selected to contest the 2017 general election. Yule defeated the Labour Party's Anna Lorck, who Yule had previously hired as a public relations consultant for local election campaigns. Yule resigned as Hastings Mayor, resulting in a by-election held in November 2017.

In the 2020 New Zealand general election, Yule stood again for Tukituki, again against Anna Lorck. Yule lost the electorate to Lorck by 1,590 votes, in an election that saw National lose 18 of its 41 electorate seats. The day after the election, Yule admitted defeat and said he had no plans for his future yet.

=== Other roles ===
Yule was the president of Local Government New Zealand. He is also a justice of the peace.

== Personal life ==
Yule is married to his wife Kerryn. He has four adult children.

Political offices
Preceded by Jeremy Dwyer	Mayor of Hastings; 2001–2017	Succeeded by Sandra Hazlehurst
New Zealand Parliament
Preceded by Craig Foss	Member of Parliament for Tukituki; 2017–2020	Succeeded by Anna Lorck
