= 2017 New Zealand general election =

- 23 September 2017

All 120 seats in the House of Representatives 61 seats needed for a majority
- Opinion polls
- Registered: 3,298,009
- Turnout: 2,630,173 (79.8% ▲1.9 pp)
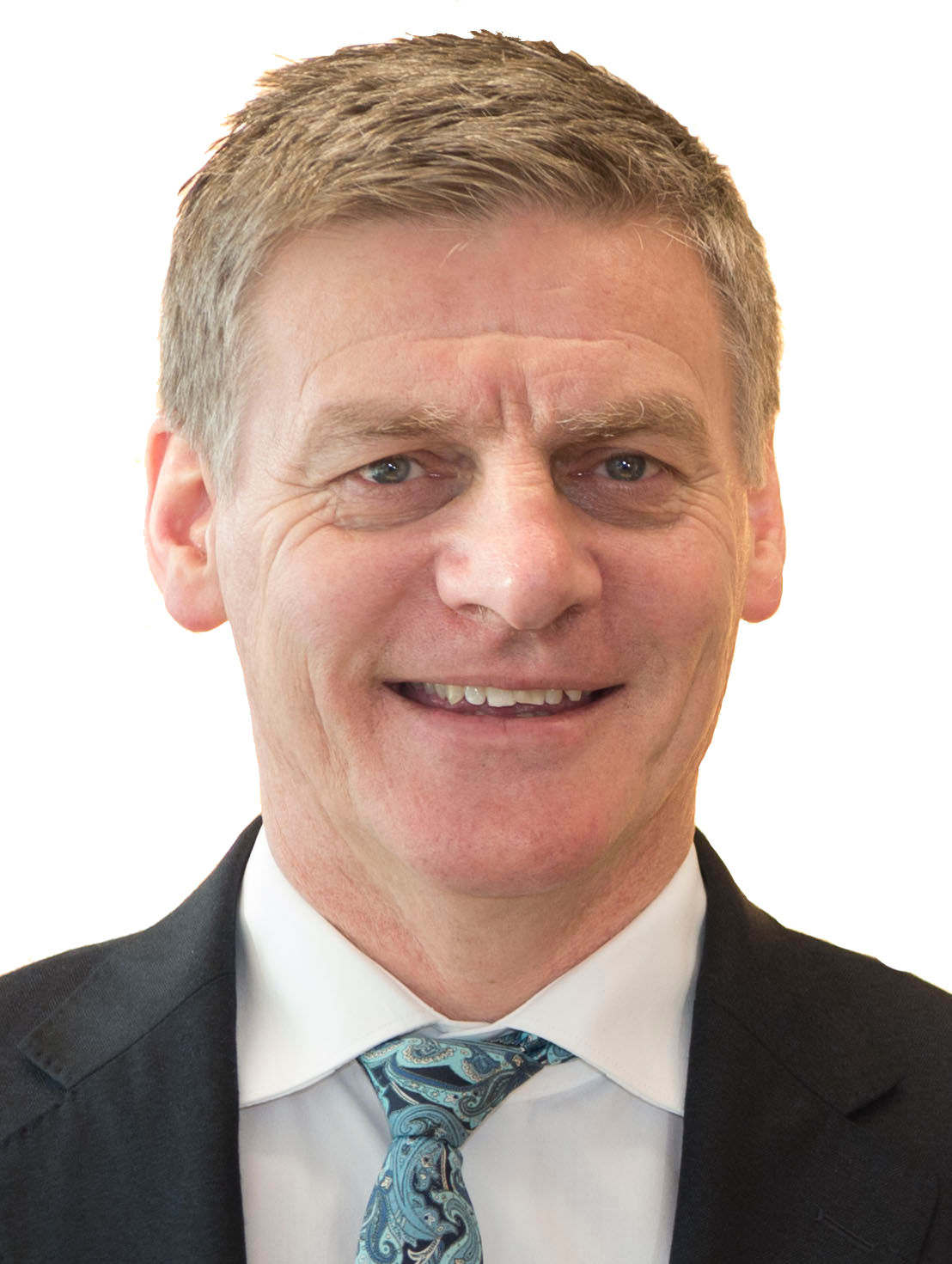

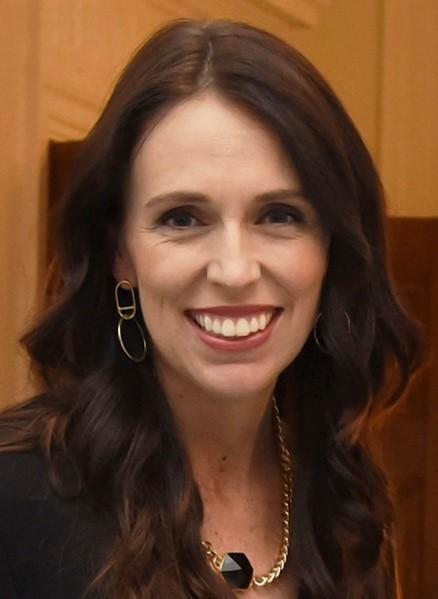

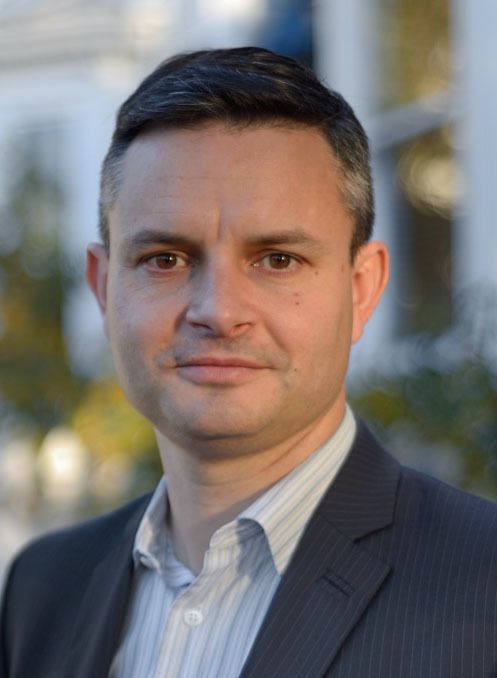

	First party	Second party	Third party
Leader	Bill English	Jacinda Ardern	Winston Peters
Party	National	Labour	NZ First
Leader since	12 December 2016	1 August 2017	18 July 1993
Leader's seat	List	Mount Albert	List (lost Northland)
Last election	60 seats, 47.04%	32 seats, 25.13%	11 seats, 8.66%
Seats before	59	32	12
Seats won	56	46	9
Seat change	▼4	▲14	▼2
Party vote	1,152,075	956,184	186,706
Percentage	44.45%	36.89%	7.20%
Swing	▼2.59 pp	▲11.76 pp	▼1.46 pp
	Fourth party	Fifth party	Sixth party
Leader	James Shaw	David Seymour	Marama Fox; Te Ururoa Flavell
Party	Green	ACT	Māori Party
Leader since	30 May 2015	4 October 2014	October 2014; 13 July 2013
Leader's seat	List	Epsom	List; Waiariki (lost both seats)
Last election	14 seats, 10.70%	1 seat, 0.69%	2 seats, 1.32%
Seats before	14	1	2
Seats won	8	1	0
Seat change	▼6	Steady	▼2
Party vote	162,443	13,075	30,580
Percentage	6.27%	0.50%	1.18%
Swing	▼4.43 pp	▼0.19 pp	▼0.14 pp
- Results by electorate, shaded by winning margin
Prime Minister and coalition before election
Bill English (National)
National (C&S: Māori, ACT, United Future)
Subsequent Prime Minister and coalition
Jacinda Ardern (Labour)
Labour—NZ First (C&S: Green)

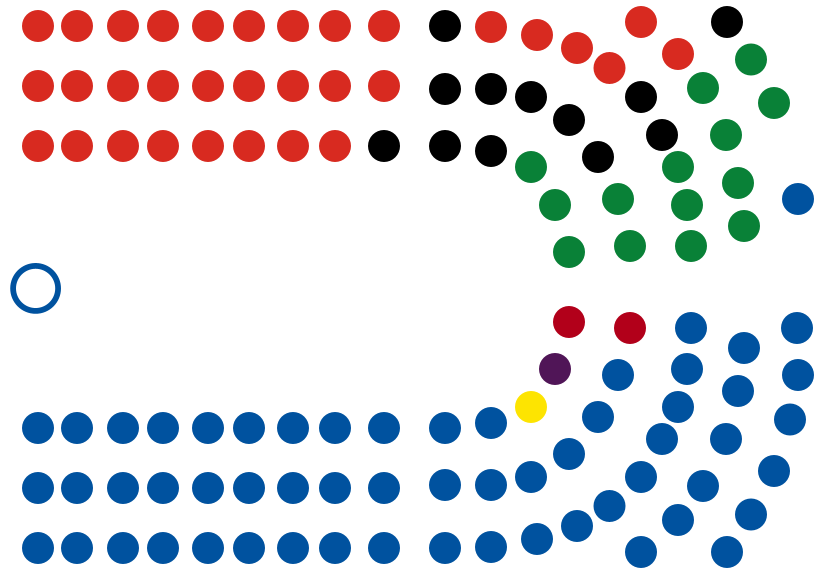
Parliamentary makeup prior to the 2017 election. Government: National (59) Māori (2) ACT (1) United Future (1) Opposition: Labour (32) Green (14) NZ First (12)

The 2017 New Zealand general election took place on Saturday 23 September 2017 to determine the membership of the 52nd New Zealand Parliament. The previous parliament was elected on 20 September 2014 and was officially dissolved on 22 August 2017. Voters elected 120 members to the House of Representatives under New Zealand's mixed-member proportional (MMP) voting system, a proportional representation system in which 71 members were elected from single-member electorates and 49 members were elected from closed party lists. Around 3.57 million people were registered to vote in the election, with 2.63 million (79.8%) turning out. Advance voting proved popular, with 1.24 million votes cast before election day, more than the previous two elections combined.

Prior to the election, the centre-right National Party, led by Prime Minister Bill English, had governed since 2008 in a minority government with confidence and supply from the Māori, ACT and United Future parties. It was the first election for English as incumbent prime minister, having replaced John Key on 12 December 2016 and the first since 1975 where both major parties had leadership changes. The main opposition parties to the National government were Labour (the official opposition), led by Jacinda Ardern, the Green Party, and New Zealand First.

The National Party won a plurality of the seats with 56, down from 60 in 2014. Labour made large gains following Jacinda Ardern becoming the party leader seven weeks prior to the election, increasing its representation from 32 to 46 seats. Labour was the only parliamentary party to gain support but a large portion came at the expense of the Green Party, which lost almost half its seats (dropping from 14 to 8) following co-leader Metiria Turei's resignation over self-admitted prior welfare benefit and electoral fraud. The anti-immigration populist party New Zealand First won 9 seats, down from 12 in 2014. ACT retained its one seat. Election-night counts had National with 58 seats, Labour with 45 seats, and the Greens with 7 seats, but when special votes were counted, National lost one list seat each to the Greens and Labour.

The election saw five parties return to Parliament, down from seven in 2014 and the lowest number since the introduction of MMP in 1996. Māori Party co-leader Te Ururoa Flavell lost his seat of Waiariki and, with the party's vote count being below the threshold of 5%, they also lost their list MP, co-leader Marama Fox, and departed Parliament. United Future leader and sole MP Peter Dunne retired from politics during the campaign due to poor polling in his electorate of Ōhāriu and his successor failed to win the seat. The party voted to dissolve less than two months later.

Even with support partner ACT retaining its sole seat, the existing National minority government were short of the 61 seats needed to govern, and Bill English declared that the arrangement would not be continued. New Zealand First's nine seats gave it the balance of power between the National Party and the Labour–Green bloc. On 19 October 2017, New Zealand First leader Winston Peters announced that the party was intending to form a minority coalition government with the Labour Party of 55 seats, with confidence and supply agreement from the Green Party. This is the first Government in New Zealand under MMP where the most popular party is not part of the Government. The election resulted in Ardern becoming New Zealand's third female prime minister, and Peters being reappointed deputy prime minister, a role he had first held in 1996–98. This marked an end to nine years under the Fifth National Government, and the beginning of the Sixth Labour Government of New Zealand.

== Electoral system ==
New Zealand uses the mixed-member proportional (MMP) voting system to elect the 120-member House of Representatives. Each voter gets two votes, one for a political party (the party vote) and one for a local candidate (the electorate vote). Political parties which meet the threshold (5% of the party vote or one electorate seat) receive seats in the House in proportion to the percentage of the party vote they receive. In the 2014 and 2017 elections, 71 of the 120 seats were filled by the MPs elected from the electorates, with the winner in each electorate determined by the plurality ("first-past-the-post") method; the remaining 49 seats were filled by candidates from each party's closed party list. If a party wins more electorates than seats it is entitled to under the party vote, an overhang results; in this case, the House will add extra seats to cover the overhang. The 2014 election saw a one-seat overhang where Peter Dunne won the Ōhāriu electorate when his United Future Party was entitled to zero seats under the party vote.

The majority of members in the House will form a Government. Since it is difficult for any single party to win a majority of seats under MMP, parties must generally negotiate with other parties either to form a majority coalition government or to obtain sufficient confidence and supply to operate as a minority government.

Electorate boundaries in the 2017 election were the same as at the 2014 election, with 64 general electorates (48 in the North Island and 16 in the South Island), and 7 Māori electorates.

=== Electoral law changes ===
The Electoral Amendment Act 2017 and the Broadcasting (Election Programmes and Election Advertising) Amendment Act 2017 made a number of changes to the conduct of general elections, including:

- Voters no longer have to complete and sign a new enrolment form if they are already enrolled and notify of a change of address, for example, through New Zealand Post's mail redirection service.
- The Electoral Commission no longer is required to send out nominations and polling place information to every voter by post; instead the Commission may use its discretion on how to advertise nominations and polling places.
- Polling booths may now use electronic electoral rolls to mark off voters.
- Counting of advance votes may now start earlier at 9:00 am (previously 2:00 pm), to take into account the increase in people voting in advance.
- The contact information of sitting MPs, such as business cards and signage on out-of-Parliament offices, has been clarified as not constituting election advertising.
- Election advertising is now legally prohibited in or near advance polling booths.
- Election hoardings may now be erected nine weeks before the election (previously two months), so the first day always falls on a Saturday.
- Parties are no longer allocated free airtime on Radio New Zealand and Television New Zealand to broadcast opening and closing addresses.

=== Eligibility to vote ===
To vote in the general election, one must:

- be on the electoral roll
- be aged 18 or over on election day (i.e. born on or before 23 September 1999)
- be a New Zealand citizen, permanent resident, residence visa holder, an Australian citizen or other person entitled to reside in New Zealand indefinitely.
- have lived in New Zealand for one year or more continuously at some point
- have been in New Zealand within the last 3 years (for New Zealand citizens) or 1 year (non-New Zealand citizens); public servants and Defence Force personnel on duty outside New Zealand, including their partners and children, are not subject to this rule.
- not be expressly disqualified from enrolling or voting (e.g., serving a sentence of imprisonment; convicted of a corrupt election practice).

== Election schedule ==
Unless an early election is called or the election date is set to circumvent holding a by-election, a general election is held every three years. The previous election was held on Saturday, 20 September 2014.

The Governor-General must issue writs for an election within seven days of the expiration or dissolution of the current Parliament. Under section 17 of the Constitution Act 1986, Parliament expires three years "from the day fixed for the return of the writs issued for the last preceding general election of members of the House of Representatives, and no longer." The writs for the 2014 election were returned on 10 October 2014, a day late due to a judicial recount of the Te Tai Tokerau electorate. As a result, the 51st Parliament would have expired, if not dissolved earlier, on Tuesday, 10 October 2017. Consequently, the last day for issuance of writs of election would have been 17 October 2017. The writs must be returned within 50 days of their issuance (save for any judicial recount or death of a candidate), which would have been Wednesday, 6 December 2017. Because polling day must be a Saturday and two weeks is generally required for the counting of special votes, the last possible date for the 2017 general election would have been Saturday, 18 November 2017.

On 1 February 2017, Prime Minister Bill English announced that the election would be held on Saturday 23 September 2017. This was the first election since 1975 that both major parties, Labour and National, contested under new leadership.

Key dates relating to the general election were as follows.

1 February 2017 (Wednesday)	Prime Minister Bill English announces election to be held on 23 September.
23 June 2017 (Friday)	The regulated election advertising period begins.
22 July 2017 (Saturday)	Election hoardings may be erected (subject to local council rules).
17 August 2017 (Wednesday)	Last sitting day for the 51st Parliament.
22 August 2017 (Tuesday)	The 51st Parliament is dissolved with a short ceremony on the steps of Parliament House.
23 August 2017 (Wednesday)	Writ day – Governor-General issues formal direction to the Electoral Commission to hold the election. Last day to ordinarily enrol to vote (late enrolments must cast special votes). Official campaigning begins; radio and television advertising begins.
28 August 2017 (Monday)	Deadline (12:00) for registered parties to lodge bulk nominations of candidates and party lists.
29 August 2017 (Tuesday)	Deadline (12:00) for individual candidates to lodge nominations.
30 August 2017 (Wednesday)	Details of candidates for election and polling places released.
6 September 2017 (Wednesday)	Overseas voting begins.
11 September 2017 (Monday)	Advance voting begins.
22 September 2017 (Friday)	Advance voting ends; overseas voting ends at 16:00 local time. Last day to enrol to vote. The regulated election advertising period ends; all election advertising must be taken down by midnight.
23 September 2017 (Saturday)	Election day – polling places open 09:00 to 19:00. Preliminary results released progressively after 19:00.
7 October 2017 (Saturday)	Official results declared.
12 October 2017 (Thursday)	Writ for election returned; official declaration of elected members (subject to judicial recounts).

== Parties and candidates ==
Political parties registered with the Electoral Commission can contest the general election as a party. To register, parties must have at least 500 financial members, an auditor, and an appropriate party name. A registered party may submit a party list to contest the party vote, and can have a party campaign expenses limit in addition to limits on individual candidates' campaigns. Unregistered parties and independents can contest the electorate vote only.

The following registered parties contested the general election:

Party	Leader(s)	Founded	Ideology	2014 election		Seats before election	Status
Party	Leader(s)	Founded	Ideology	% party vote	Seats	Seats before election	Status
National	Bill English	1936	Conservatism, classical liberalism	47.04	60	59 / 121	Minority
Labour	Jacinda Ardern	1916	Social democracy	25.13	32	32 / 121	Opposition
Green	James Shaw	1990	Green politics	10.70	14	14 / 121	Opposition
NZ First	Winston Peters	1993	Conservatism, nationalism, populism	8.66	11	12 / 121	Opposition
Māori Party	Te Ururoa Flavell/Marama Fox	2004	Indigenous rights	1.32	2	2 / 121	Confidence and supply
ACT	David Seymour	1994	Classical liberalism, right-libertarianism	0.69	1	1 / 121	Confidence and supply
United Future	Damian Light	2000	Social liberalism, centrism	0.22	1	1 / 121	Confidence and supply
Conservative	Leighton Baker	2011	Conservatism, fiscal conservatism, social conservatism	3.99	–	Extra-parliamentary	Extra-parliamentary
Internet	Suzie Dawson	2014	Collaborative e-democracy, Internet freedom, privacy, copyright reform	1.42	–	Extra-parliamentary	Extra-parliamentary
Mana	Hone Harawira	2011	Tino rangatiratanga, Māori rights	1.42	–	Extra-parliamentary	Extra-parliamentary
Legalise Cannabis	Jeff Lye	1996	Cannabis legalisation	0.46	–	Extra-parliamentary	Extra-parliamentary
Ban 1080	Mike Downard/Bill Wallace	2014	Opposition to 1080 poison	0.21	–	Extra-parliamentary	Extra-parliamentary
Democrats	Stephnie de Ruyter	1985	Social credit, economic democracy, left-wing nationalism	0.07	–	Extra-parliamentary	Extra-parliamentary
Opportunities	Gareth Morgan	2016	Radical centrism, environmentalism	not founded	–	Extra-parliamentary	Extra-parliamentary
Outdoors	David Haynes/Alan Simmons	2015	Environmentalism	not founded	–	Extra-parliamentary	Extra-parliamentary
People's Party	Roshan Nauhria	2015	Minority rights, cultural rights	not founded	–	Extra-parliamentary	Extra-parliamentary

=== MPs who did not stand for re-election ===
Twenty-two members of parliament announced that they would not stand for re-election.

Name	Party	Electorate/List	Term in office	Date announced
Todd Barclay	National	Clutha-Southland	2014–2017	21 June 2017
Chester Borrows	National	Whanganui	2005–2017	29 November 2016
Steffan Browning	Green	List	2011–2017	15 December 2016
David Clendon	Green	List	2009–2017	7 August 2017
Clayton Cosgrove	Labour	List	1999–2017	10 April 2016
David Cunliffe	Labour	New Lynn	1999–2017	1 November 2016
Catherine Delahunty	Green	List	2008–2017	15 December 2016
Peter Dunne	United Future	Ōhāriu	1984–2017	21 August 2017
Craig Foss	National	Tukituki	2005–2017	14 December 2016
Paul Foster-Bell	National	List	2013–2017	26 February 2017
Jo Goodhew	National	Rangitata	2005–2017	25 January 2017
Kennedy Graham	Green	List	2008–2017	7 August 2017
John Key	National	Helensville	2002–2017	5 December 2016
Annette King	Labour	Rongotai	1984–1990; 1993–2017	1 March 2017
Sam Lotu-Iiga	National	Maungakiekie	2008–2017	13 December 2016
Murray McCully	National	East Coast Bays	1987–2017	15 December 2016
Sue Moroney	Labour	List	2005–2017	30 April 2017
Jono Naylor	National	List	2014–2017	3 November 2016
Hekia Parata	National	List	2008–2017	19 October 2016
Barbara Stewart	NZ First	List	2002–2008; 2011–2017	7 March 2017
Lindsay Tisch	National	Waikato	1999–2017	20 June 2016
Maurice Williamson	National	Pakuranga	1987–2017	26 July 2016

=== Electorate-only or list-only MPs ===
- Bill English, Steven Joyce, David Carter, and Jian Yang of National stood as list-only candidates (as in 2014).
- Andrew Little announced in January 2017 that he would not contest New Plymouth, but would run as a list-only candidate.
- Trevor Mallard announced in July 2016 that he would not contest Hutt South, but run as a list-only candidate, with the intention of becoming Speaker of the House.
- Labour announced in March 2017 that the party's six incumbent Maori electorate MPs would not contest the party list but would run as electorate-only candidates, in a challenge to the Māori Party, and to increase the number of Maori MPs in the Labour caucus. After the August 2017 leadership change, it was announced that new deputy leader and Te Tai Tokerau MP Kelvin Davis would now contend the party list, as required by the constitution of the party.
- Metiria Turei stepped down as co-leader of the Green Party and after announcing that she would retire from politics at the election, withdrew her name from the party list. She appeared in the list of candidates for the Te Tai Tonga electorate.

== Results ==
Preliminary results were gradually released after polling booths closed at 19:00 (NZST) on 23 September. The preliminary count only includes advance ordinary and election day ordinary votes; it does not include any special votes. Special votes include votes from those who enrolled after the deadline of 23 August, those who voted outside their electorate (this includes all overseas votes), hospital votes, and those voters enrolled on the unpublished roll.

All voting papers, counterfoils and electoral rolls are returned to the electorate's returning officer for a mandatory recount; this also includes approving and counting any special votes, and compiling a master roll to ensure no voter has voted more than once. Official results, including all recounted ordinary votes and special votes, were released by the Electoral Commission on Saturday 7 October 2017.

Parties and candidates have three working days after the release of the official results to apply for a judicial recount. These recounts take place under the auspices of a District Court judge (the Chief District Court Judge in case of a nationwide recount), and may delay the return of the election writ by a few days.

Party vote percentage
1. National (44.5%)
2. Labour (36.9%)
3. NZ First (7.20%)
4. Green (6.27%)
5. Opportunities (2.44%)
6. Māori (1.18%)
7. ACT (0.50%)
8. Legalise Cannabis (0.31%)
9. Conservative (0.24%)
10. Other (0.52%)

The House of Representatives after the election, showing the resulting kingmaker position held by NZ First.

Highest polling party in each electorate.

Summary of the 23 September 2017 election for the House of Representatives
Party	Party vote			Electorate vote			Seats			
Party	Votes	%	Change (pp)	Votes	%	Change (pp)	List	Electorate	Total	+/-
National	1,152,075	44.45	▼2.59	1,114,367	44.05	▼2.0	15	41	56	▼4
Labour	956,184	36.89	▲11.76	958,155	37.88	▲3.75	17	29	46	▲14
NZ First	186,706	7.20	▼1.46	137,816	5.45	▲2.32	9	0	9	▼2
Green	162,443	6.27	▼4.43	174,725	6.91	▼0.15	8	0	8	▼6
ACT	13,075	0.50	▼0.19	25,471	1.01	▼0.17	0	1	1	Steady
Opportunities	63,261	2.44	new	26,034	1.03	new	0	0	0	new
Māori Party	30,580	1.18	▼0.14	53,247	2.11	▲0.32	0	0	0	▼2
Legalise Cannabis	8,075	0.31	▼0.14	4,144	0.16	▼0.05	0	0	0	Steady
Conservative	6,253	0.24	▼3.75	6,115	0.24	▼3.21	0	0	0	Steady
Mana	3,642	0.14	▼1.28 (Note: Contested the 2014 election as part of Internet Mana.)	8,196	0.32	▼1.26	0	0	0	Steady
Ban 1080	3,005	0.12	▼0.10	3,003	0.12	▼0.07	0	0	0	Steady
People's Party	1,890	0.07	new	—	—	—	0	0	0	new
United Future	1,782	0.07	▼0.15	1,285	0.05	▼0.58	0	0	0	▼1
Outdoors	1,620	0.06	new	1,357	0.05	new	0	0	0	new
Democrats	806	0.03	▼0.04	1,794	0.20	▼0.13	0	0	0	Steady
Internet	499	0.02	▼1.40	—	—	▼1.58	0	0	0	Steady
Unregistered Parties	—	—	—	1,073	0.04	Steady	—	0	0	Steady
Independent	—	—	—	12,749	0.50	▲0.34	—	0	0	Steady
Valid votes	2,591,896	98.54	▲0.20	2,529,531	96.17	▲0.20				
Informal votes	10,793	0.41	▼0.03	30,554	1.16	▲0.02				
Disallowed votes	27,484	1.04	▼0.18	70,088	2.66	▼0.23				
Below electoral threshold	121,413	4.62	—	—	—	—				
Total	2,630,173	100		2,630,173	100		49	71	120	▼1
Eligible voters and Turnout	3,298,009	79.75	▲1.85	3,298,009	79.75	▲1.85				

Constituency Vote
National	44.05%
Labour	37.88%
Green	6.91%
NZ First	5.45%
Māori	2.11%
Opportunities	1.03%
ACT	1.01%
Others	1.56%

Party vote
National	44.45%
Labour	36.89%
NZ First	7.20%
Green	6.27%
Opportunities	2.24%
Māori	1.18%
ACT	0.50%
Others	1.07%

Parliament seats
National	46.67%
Labour	38.33%
NZ First	7.50%
Green	6.67%
ACT	0.83%

=== Electorate results ===
Party affiliation of winning electorate candidates.

Prior to the election, the National Party held the majority of the electorate seats with 40. Labour held 27 seats, and NZ First, ACT, and United Future held one seat each. Between the 2014 and 2017 elections, one seat changed allegiance: in the 2015 Northland by-election, NZ First leader Winston Peters won the seat off National, after MP Mike Sabin resigned.

Fifty-five electorates saw the incumbent MP re-elected, while another 11 saw a new MP elected from the same party as the retiring incumbent.

In three electorates, the incumbent MP was defeated. Labour candidate and lawyer Duncan Webb claimed Christchurch Central off National MP Nicky Wagner; Labour previously held the electorate continuously from its formation in 1946 until Wagner won it in 2011. After National lost Northland to NZ First leader Winston Peters in 2015, candidate Matt King claimed the electorate back for National from Peters. Labour candidate and former television presenter Tāmati Coffey claimed Waiariki off Māori Party MP Te Ururoa Flavell; Flavell's defeat saw the Māori Party without an electorate seat and with the party polling below 5% in the party vote, saw the party voted out of Parliament. Coffey's win also saw Labour claim a clean sweep of the Māori electorates for the first time since the 2002 election.

In Hutt South, National list MP Chris Bishop claimed the electorate from Labour – the first time the electorate has swung since its creation in 1996. Contributing to the swing was the 2014 boundary changes which saw the Labour-leaning suburb of Naenae swapped for the National-leaning western hill suburbs of Lower Hutt, and long standing Labour MP Trevor Mallard standing down at the election to contest the party list only. In Ōhāriu, incumbent United Future MP Peter Dunne stepped down after holding the electorate in various incarnations since 1984. Labour candidate and former police officer Greg O'Connor subsequently claimed the electorate.

Overall, National gained one electorate to hold 41, Labour gained two electorates to hold 29, while ACT retained its one electorate seat.

Hamilton West was considered to be New Zealand's bellwether seat. Since the formation of the electorate in 1969, the winning candidate was from the party that went on to form the government, with the exception of 1993 when it elected a Labour MP while National went on to form the government (albeit with a one-seat majority). Hamilton West, Maungakiekie and Rotorua were also regarded as bellwethers in the MMP era, swinging with the government at every election since 1996. All three electorates in the 2017 election were won by National candidates.

The table below shows the results of the 2017 general election:

Key:

National	Labour	Green	NZ First	Opportunities
ACT	United Future	Māori Party	Mana	Independent

Electorate results of the 2017 New Zealand general election
Electorate	Incumbent	Winner	Majority	Runner up	Third place
Auckland Central	Nikki Kaye		1,581	Helen White	Denise Roche
Bay of Plenty	Todd Muller		13,996	Angie Warren-Clark	Lester Gray
Botany	Jami-Lee Ross		12,839	Tofik Mamedov	Julie Zhu
Christchurch Central	Nicky Wagner	Duncan Webb	2,871	Nicky Wagner	Peter Richardson
Christchurch East	Poto Williams		7,480	Jo Hayes	Cathy Sweet
Clutha-Southland	Todd Barclay	Hamish Walker	14,354	Cherie Chapman	Mark Patterson
Coromandel	Scott Simpson		14,326	Nathaniel Blomfield	Scott Summerfield
Dunedin North	David Clark		11,754	Michael Woodhouse	Niki Bould
Dunedin South	Clare Curran		8,717	Matt Gregory	Shane Gallagher
East Coast	Anne Tolley		4,807	Kiri Allan	Julian Tilley
East Coast Bays	Murray McCully	Erica Stanford	16,290	Naisi Chen	Nicholas Mayne
Epsom	David Seymour		5,519	Paul Goldsmith	David Parker
Hamilton East	David Bennett		5,810	Jamie Strange	Sam Taylor
Hamilton West	Tim Macindoe		7,731	Gaurav Sharma	Jo Wrigley
Helensville	Vacant (Note: Was John Key until his resignation on 14 April 2017.)	Chris Penk	14,608	Kurt Taogaga	Hayley Holt
Hunua	Andrew Bayly		19,443	Baljit Kaur	Jon Reeves
Hutt South	Trevor Mallard (Note: Mallard did not re-contest the electorate this election, instead contesting the party list only.)	Chris Bishop	1,530	Ginny Andersen	Virginia Horrocks
Ilam	Gerry Brownlee		8,256	Raf Manji	Anthony Rimell
Invercargill	Sarah Dowie		5,579	Liz Craig	Ria Bond
Kaikoura	Stuart Smith		10,553	Janette Walker	Jamie Arbuckle
Kelston	Carmel Sepuloni		7,269	Bala Beeram	Nicola Smith
Mana	Kris Faafoi		10,980	Euon Murrell	Jan Logie
Māngere	William Sio		14,597	Agnes Loheni	Elaine Dyett
Manukau East	Jenny Salesa		12,589	Kanwaljit Singh Bakshi	William Flesher
Manurewa	Louisa Wall		8,374	Katrina Bungard	John Hall
Maungakiekie	Sam Lotu-Iiga	Denise Lee	2,157	Priyanca Radhakrishnan	Chlöe Swarbrick
Mount Albert	Jacinda Ardern		15,264	Melissa Lee	Julie Anne Genter
Mount Roskill	Michael Wood		6,898	Parmjeet Parmar	Ricardo Menéndez March
Napier	Stuart Nash		5,220	David Elliott	Damon Rusden
Nelson	Nick Smith		4,283	Rachel Boyack	Matt Lawrey
New Lynn	David Cunliffe	Deborah Russell	2,825	Paulo Garcia	Leilani Tamu
New Plymouth	Jonathan Young		7,733	Corie Haddock	Murray Chong
North Shore	Maggie Barry		12,716	Romy Udanga	Josh Hubbard
Northcote	Jonathan Coleman		6,210	Shanan Halbert	Rebekah Jaung
Northland	Winston Peters	Matt King	1,389	Winston Peters	Willow-Jean Prime
Ōhāriu	Peter Dunne	Greg O'Connor	1,051	Brett Hudson	Jessica Hammond Doube
Ōtaki	Nathan Guy		6,156	Rob McCann	Sam Ferguson
Pakuranga	Maurice Williamson	Simeon Brown	14,886	Barry Kirker	Suzanne Kelly
Palmerston North	Iain Lees-Galloway		6,392	Adrienne Pierce	Darroch Ball
Papakura	Judith Collins		7,486	Jesse Pabla	Toa Greening
Port Hills	Ruth Dyson		7,916	Nuk Korako	Eugenie Sage
Rangitata	Jo Goodhew	Andrew Falloon	6,331	Jo Luxton	Olly Wilson
Rangitīkei	Ian McKelvie		10,290	Heather Warren	Rob Stevenson
Rimutaka	Chris Hipkins		8,609	Carolyn O'Fallon	Stefan Grand-Meyer
Rodney	Mark Mitchell		19,561	Marja Lubeck	Tracey Martin
Rongotai	Annette King	Paul Eagle	10,900	Chris Finlayson	Teall Crossen
Rotorua	Todd McClay		7,901	Ben Sandford	Fletcher Tabuteau
Selwyn	Amy Adams		19,639	Tony Condon	Chrys Horn
Tāmaki	Simon O'Connor		15,402	Sam McDonald	Richard Leckinger
Taranaki-King Country	Barbara Kuriger		15,259	Hilary Humphrey	Robert Moore
Taupō	Louise Upston		14,335	Al'a Al-Bustanji	Julie Sandilands
Tauranga	Simon Bridges		11,252	Jan Tinetti	Clayton Mitchell
Te Atatū	Phil Twyford		3,184	Alfred Ngaro	David Wilson
Tukituki	Craig Foss	Lawrence Yule	2,813	Anna Lorck	Joe Kairau
Upper Harbour	Paula Bennett		9,556	Jin An	James Goodhue
Waikato	Lindsay Tisch	Tim van de Molen	15,452	Brooke Loader	Stu Husband
Waimakariri	Matt Doocey		10,766	Dan Rosewarne	Nikki Berry
Wairarapa	Alastair Scott		2,872	Kieran McAnulty	Ron Mark
Waitaki	Jacqui Dean		12,816	Zélie Allan	Pat Wall
Wellington Central	Grant Robertson		9,963	Nicola Willis	James Shaw
West Coast-Tasman	Damien O'Connor		5,593	Maureen Pugh	Kate Fulton
Whanganui	Chester Borrows	Harete Hipango	1,706	Steph Lewis	Reginald Skipworth
Whangarei	Shane Reti		10,967	Tony Savage	Shane Jones
Wigram	Megan Woods		4,594	David Hiatt	Richard Wesley
Māori electorates
Hauraki-Waikato	Nanaia Mahuta		9,223	Rahui Papa	n/a
Ikaroa-Rāwhiti	Meka Whaitiri		4,210	Marama Fox	Elizabeth Kerekere
Tāmaki Makaurau	Peeni Henare		3,809	Shane Taurima	Marama Davidson
Te Tai Hauāuru	Adrian Rurawhe		1,039	Howie Tamati	Jack McDonald
Te Tai Tokerau	Kelvin Davis		4,807	Hone Harawira	Godfrey Rudolph
Te Tai Tonga	Rino Tirikatene		4,676	Metiria Turei	Mei Reedy-Taare
Waiariki	Te Ururoa Flavell	Tāmati Coffey	1,719	Te Ururoa Flavell	n/a

=== List results ===
The following MPs were elected from their respective party lists:

National	Labour	NZ First	Green
Bill English (01); David Carter (03); Steven Joyce (04); Chris Finlayson (09); Michael Woodhouse (10); Paul Goldsmith (18); Alfred Ngaro (20); Nicky Wagner (22); Brett Hudson (30); Melissa Lee (31); Kanwaljit Singh Bakshi (32); Jian Yang (33); Parmjeet Parmar (34); Jo Hayes (36); Nuk Korako (42)	Andrew Little (03); David Parker (10); Priyanca Radhakrishnan (12); Raymond Huo (13); Jan Tinetti (15); Willow-Jean Prime (17); Kiri Allan (21); Willie Jackson (22); Ginny Andersen (28); Jo Luxton (29); Liz Craig (31); Marja Lubeck (32); Trevor Mallard (33); Jamie Strange (36); Anahila Kanongata'a-Suisuiki (37); Kieran McAnulty (38); Angie Warren-Clark (39)	Winston Peters (01); Ron Mark (02); Tracey Martin (03); Fletcher Tabuteau (04); Darroch Ball (05); Clayton Mitchell (06); Mark Patterson (07); Shane Jones (08); Jenny Marcroft (09)	James Shaw (01); Marama Davidson (02); Julie Anne Genter (03); Eugenie Sage (04); Gareth Hughes (05); Jan Logie (06); Chlöe Swarbrick (07); Golriz Ghahraman (08)

=== Changes in MPs ===
Two former MPs (Shane Jones and Willie Jackson) and 31 first-time MPs were elected to the 52nd Parliament, joining 87 incumbents from the 51st Parliament.

Following the retirement of Peter Dunne, Bill English (National, list) became the new Father of the House, having served as an MP continuously since 1990. While both Winston Peters and Trevor Mallard have served longer than English, their tenures have been non-continuous.

23-year-old Chlöe Swarbrick (Green, list) became the new Baby of the House. She was the youngest MP to be elected to Parliament since the election of the 23-year-old Marilyn Waring in 1975.

Golriz Ghahraman (Green, list) became the first former refugee to be elected to the New Zealand Parliament.

== Government formation ==
Preliminary election results gave National 58 seats, Labour 45, New Zealand First 9, Green 7, and ACT 1, leaving no party or obvious coalition able to command a parliamentary majority of 61 seats. Final results saw the National Party lose two further seats, one each to Labour and the Greens, confirming New Zealand First as the election's kingmaker. Both the National and Labour parties outlined planned negotiations with New Zealand First in the hope of forming a government. A National–NZ First coalition would hold 65 seats, while a Labour–NZ First coalition would also need the support of the Green Party to form a majority government with 63 seats. National Party leader Bill English ruled out a formal governing arrangement with the ACT Party's sole MP David Seymour, though such an agreement existed following the 2014 election.

New Zealand First has held the balance of power in previous parliaments and its leader has served in several ministries. Following the 1996 election, the party joined a coalition government with National with Peters as Deputy Prime Minister and Treasurer, an agreement that ended when Peters was sacked from Cabinet in August 1998. Following the 2005 election, NZ First entered into a confidence and supply agreement with the minority Labour government that also saw Peters appointed as Foreign Minister but not as a member of the Cabinet.

Shaw announced the Greens' negotiation team of himself, MP Eugenie Sage, acting chief of staff Tory Whanau, Green co-convenor Debs Martin and campaign staffer Andrew Campbell on 26 September. Labour's negotiators were led by leader Ardern and deputy leader Davis.

Negotiations concluded on 12 October, with "extensive dossiers" provided to NZ First from both Labour and National. The NZ First Board met alongside the parliamentary caucus on 16 October to begin the process of formally choosing a coalition partner.

On 19 October, NZ First announced the formation of a minority coalition government with Labour. As part of the agreement, NZ First received four ministerial positions inside Cabinet and one parliamentary under-secretary position. Winston Peters also accepted an offer of the role of Deputy Prime Minister.

The Greens received three ministerial positions outside Cabinet and one parliamentary under-secretary position as a result of a confidence and supply agreement reached between them and Labour.

=== Cabinet and ministerial roles ===
On 20 October 2017, the names of Labour's 16 Cabinet ministers were announced as Jacinda Ardern, David Clark, Clare Curran, Kelvin Davis, Chris Hipkins, Iain Lees-Galloway, Andrew Little, Nanaia Mahuta, Stuart Nash, Damien O'Connor, David Parker, Grant Robertson, Jenny Salesa, Carmel Sepuloni, Phil Twyford, and Megan Woods. The Labour ministers outside cabinet were Kris Faafoi, Peeni Henare, Willie Jackson, William Sio, and Meka Whaitiri.

The Green Party announced on 21 October its three ministers outside cabinet and one parliamentary under-secretary slots as James Shaw, Julie Anne Genter, Jan Logie and Eugenie Sage.

The final ministers to be named were from New Zealand First. On 25 October, it was announced that Ron Mark, Tracey Martin and Shane Jones would join the Cabinet, with Fletcher Tabuteau as a parliamentary under-secretary.

== Campaigning ==
=== Expense limits and broadcasting allocations ===
During the three-month regulated period prior to election day (i.e. 23 June to 22 September 2017), parties and candidates have limits on how much they may spend on election campaigning. It is illegal in New Zealand to campaign on election day itself.

For the 2017 election, every registered party contending the party vote is permitted to spend $1,115,000 plus $26,200 per electorate candidate on election campaigning during the regulated period, excluding radio and television campaigning (broadcasting funding is allocated separately). A party contesting all 71 electorates is therefore permitted to spend $2,975,200 on election campaigning. All electorate candidates are permitted to spend $26,200 each on campaigning over and above their party's allocation.

Registered parties are allocated a separate broadcasting budget for radio and television campaigning. Only money from the broadcasting allocation can be used to purchase airtime; the actual production costs of advertisements can come from the general election expenses budget. The Electoral Commission sets the amount of broadcasting funds each party gets; generally the allocation is based on the number of seats in the current Parliament, previous election results, and support in opinion polls. The initial broadcasting allocation was released on 26 May 2017. The broadcasting allocation was revised on 23 August 2017, redistributing funds from parties that failed to register in time for the election.

Party	Broadcasting allocation
National	$1,370,860
Labour	$1,105,533
Green	$530,656
NZ First	$420,102
Māori Party	$132,664
ACT	$99,498
United Future	$99,498
Conservative	$55,277
Internet	$55,277
Mana	$55,277
Ban 1080	$44,221
Democrats	$44,221
Legalise Cannabis	$44,221
Opportunities	$44,221
Outdoors	$44,221

Third party promoters, such as trade unions and lobby groups, can campaign during the regulated period. The maximum expense limit is $315,000 for those promoters registered with the Electoral Commission, and $12,600 for unregistered promoters. As of 19 August 2017, the following third party promoters were registered:

- ActionStation
- New Zealand Aged Care Association
- New Zealand Council of Trade Unions
- E tū
- Family First New Zealand
- Hobson's Pledge
- New Zealand Nurses Organisation
- Post Primary Teachers' Association
- New Zealand Public Service Association
- New Zealand Taxpayers' Union
- Tertiary Education Union
- Thomas Enright
- New Zealand Union of Students' Associations

=== Issues ===
In a January 2017 poll conducted by Roy Morgan Research, 26 percent of respondents named housing supply and affordability as the most important issue facing New Zealand, while another 17 percent named poverty and income inequality.

==== Education ====
On 27 August 2017, National pledged a $379 million education package. New "digital academies" focused on IT training and similar to existing trades academies, would be introduced for 1,000 year-12 and 13 students at a cost of $48 million. There would also be investments of $126 million to improve maths achievements for primary school students and $160 million to give all primary school students the opportunity to learn a second language if they wished. There would be an expansion of the National Standards scheme that would allow parents to check the progress of their child via their mobile phone.

Labour leader Jacinda Ardern announced on 14 August 2017 that the party had reinstated a 2015 pledge to assist school students to learn to drive and budget. Five driving lessons and the fees for the licence test would be free, and students would be taught life skills and budgeting. On 29 August, Ardern announced that Labour would implement its 2016 policy of three years free tertiary education, starting with one year in 2018 and expanding to two years in 2021 and three years in 2024. She also announced a $50 per week increase in the student allowance and student loan living costs.

The ACT party continued to support partnership (charter) schools, with intentions to allow state schools to convert into partnership schools. ACT leader David Seymour said on 2 September 2017 that the party would give schools $975 million more, so long as they abandon nationally negotiated union contracts. Schools would be funded $93,000 per teacher in a bulk funding arrangement and would be free to allocate the grant how they wanted, with principals able to decide how much to pay individual teachers. Teachers' pay would be boosted by $20,000 on average, and the payments would reward good teachers and attract "our brightest graduates" to careers in teaching.

==== Housing ====
According to Quotable Value, residential house prices across New Zealand increased 34.2% between June 2014 and June 2017, from an average of $476,000 to an average of $639,000. In the Auckland metro area, the increase was 45.5% in the same period, from $718,000 to $1,045,000.

ACT announced its housing policy on 6 August 2017, proposing to scrap the urban rural boundary to free up land for those who want to subdivide and build, claiming that this would create room for 600,000 possible houses.

Green Party leader James Shaw reaffirmed on 22 August the party's intention to introduce a capital gains tax, saying that it was "a priority" for the party and a measure "we want to see addressed in a first term of a new government." Shaw said the fact that New Zealand was one of the only countries in the developed world without a consistent capital gains tax had helped fuel inequality between "those who don't own a home and those who now own ten".

Labour's flagship housing policy was the KiwiBuild scheme, which would aim to build 100,000 homes over 10 years. Labour announced on 3 September it would extend the landlords' termination notice period to 90 days (from 42 days), abolish termination without cause, and limit rent increases to once every 12 months (from 6 months). This was in addition to previously announced policies of extending the "bright-line test" for taxing capital gains on residential properties from two years to five years, and abolishing negative gearing on investment properties.

==== Immigration ====
According to Statistics New Zealand estimates, New Zealand's net migration (long-term arrivals minus long-term departures) in the June 2016/17 year was 72,300. That was up from 38,300 in the June 2013/14 year. Of those migrants specifying a region of settlement, 61 percent settled in the Auckland region.

Labour promised to reduce net immigration by about 20–30,000 annually, partly by reducing the number of students enrolled in "low value" courses that were susceptible to being used as a subterfuge for immigration. The party said it would introduce a stricter test regime to ensure employers seek to hire New Zealanders before recruiting overseas applicants, and would require skilled migrants to stay and work in the region their visa was issued for.

National planned to count migrants as "skilled" only if the job they were coming to paid more than about $49,000 a year, but the plan was opposed by employers who said their businesses would be put at risk by the blocking of foreign workers. Immigrants only needed to be paid over $41,859 a year – resulting in about 6000 more workers being able to stay in the country longer. Those earning less would be considered low-skilled and can stay in the country for a maximum of three years, after which a stand-down period applies before they can apply to come back. National planned to introduce legislation in 2018 that would raise the residency requirements for superannuation from 10 to 20 years.

NZ First leader Winston Peters vowed to reduce net immigration to around 10,000 per year. Peters said that unemployed New Zealanders would be trained to take jobs as the number was reduced, and the number of older immigrants would be limited, with more bonded to the regions.

The Green Party proposed that migration should be capped to 1 per cent of population growth, but later abandoned that policy due to the perception that the Greens were pandering to anti-immigrant rhetoric.

ACT had "long opposed populist attacks on immigrants", according to David Seymour. ACT wanted immigrants to "demonstrate they've earned above the average wage in their field" to get residency, and it would put an end to foreigners leaving their kids in New Zealand while paying taxes overseas by implementing an "infrastructure charge" of $10 per day for a maximum of a year for all migrants.

The Opportunities Party (TOP) wanted a change so that immigration would not be driven by student visas or reciprocal visitor working visas. The party also wanted to abandon the requirement for highly skilled migrants to have a job to come to.

==== Rail transport ====
National Party leader and Prime Minister Bill English announced on 6 August 2017 that there would be a $267 million investment in Auckland and Wellington commuter rail, which would include (in Auckland) electrification of the line between Papakura and Pukekohe, a third line between Westfield and Wiri, and (in Wellington) double-tracking the line between Trentham and Upper Hutt, and several other improvements.

Labour announced on 6 August 2017 that it would accelerate the building of a proposed light rail system between Auckland CBD and Auckland Airport so that it would be completed within a decade. The plan is part of Labour's wider transport improvements that would include a light rail link to West Auckland, an eventual extension of light rail to the North Shore, a bus network between Howick and the airport, electrification from Papakura to Pukekohe, a third main line between Westfield and Papakura, and other rail and road improvements. On 21 August 2017, the party's leader Jacinda Ardern announced a $20 million plan for a passenger rail service linking Auckland, Hamilton and Tauranga. She said that the region would grow by 800,000 people in the next 25 years, and that rail was historically a fundamental travel mode and it was time that it was again.

The Green Party announced on 17 August 2017 that it would introduce a passenger rail service between Auckland, Hamilton and Tauranga on a trial basis from 2019. The party had previously said that its policy was to complete the electrification of the rail network between Auckland and Hamilton and extend electrification to Tauranga. On 25 August 2017, Green party plans for a light rail line between Wellington railway station and Wellington Airport via Newtown were announced. The party would establish the line by 2027, and it could form the spine of an extended network north to Epuni via central Lower Hutt and south to Island Bay.

==== Poverty ====
During the leaders' debate held on 4 September 2017, National leader Bill English committed his party to a target to bring 100,000 children out of poverty within the next term. The National party policy was mainly built around their Families Package, due to be introduced in April 2018, which English said would bring 50,000 children out of poverty. They would increase the tax credits for 310,000 families who receive Working for Families, and the abatement level for the tax credits would decrease from $36,350 to $35,000.

At the same debate Labour leader Jacinda Ardern committed to changing the law to require that every government budget update would have to include a measurement of child poverty. Labour promised to extend Working for Families to another 30,000 families, by raising the abatement threshold and increasing the tax credits. They introduced the Best Start package that would give $60 a week for each child in their first year and extend paid parental leave to 26 weeks.

On 16 July 2017, the Green Party announced at their AGM that they would increase all benefits by 20% and remove all penalties and excessive sanctions to those on the benefit, looking to change the “punitive culture” at MSD. They would boost the Working for Families package and raise the minimum wage to $17.75.

The Māori Party set a target to eliminate all poverty by 2025, introducing a living wage for all workers and making cost of living adjustments to all benefits. The party promised to increase support to grandparents raising grandchildren and expand Whānau Ora.

TOP proposed an introduction of a universal basic income of $200 a week to all families with children under 3 (or under 6 if adopted), which would replace paid maternity leave. Low income families regardless of employment would get $72 a week and free child care.

ACT campaigned on implementing lifetime limits of five years for the sole parent benefit and three years for the jobseeker benefit. They proposed cutting Working for Families and paid parental leave for upper income earners. On 12 July 2017, ACT deputy leader Beth Houlbrooke made a Facebook post criticising Labour's Best Start package, stating "The fact is, parents who cannot afford to have children should not be having them. ACT believes in personal responsibility, meaning we stand with the majority of parents who wait and save before having children."

=== Party campaigns ===
==== National ====
National was campaigning for a fourth term in government. If successful, it would have been the first four-term government since the Second National Government (1960–72), and the first four-term government under MMP. National revealed the design of its first tranche of party hoardings in early July, featuring leader Bill English and the slogan "Delivering for New Zealanders".

On 20 August 2017, English announced that the government, if re-elected, planned to build ten new "Roads of National Significance" at a cost of $10.5 billion. Four-laning the Hawke's Bay Expressway, a solution for the Manawatū Gorge road (closed after rock falls in April 2017 and a long history of such falls), and a highway from Wellsford to Whangārei were included.

The party announced on 13 August 2017 that it would create a new bootcamp for youth offenders at the Waiouru Military Camp. English said that there were about 150 "very serious young offenders". The justice minister said that a new Young Serious Offender (YSO) classification would be established for the group.

Prime Minister Bill English and Health Minister Jonathan Coleman announced on 19 August 2017 that a new hospital costing more than $1.2 billion would be built to replace Dunedin Hospital, rather than refurbishing the existing building. It would be expected to open in 7–10 years. On 21 August, English and Coleman announced a pledge that 600,000 low income people would have access to $18 doctors' visits. The Community Services Card would also be expanded to an additional 350,000 people with low incomes and high housing costs.

The party's infrastructure spokesman Steven Joyce announced on 2 September 2017 that a National Infrastructure Commission would be set up to help expand and oversee public–private partnerships (PPPs). The commission would supervise large infrastructure projects, such as the building of new schools, roads, and hospitals, which would be built as PPPs. It was likely that the first project would be the $50 million rebuild of Whangarei Boys' High School, but several other large projects totalling several billion dollars were also being considered.

==== Labour ====
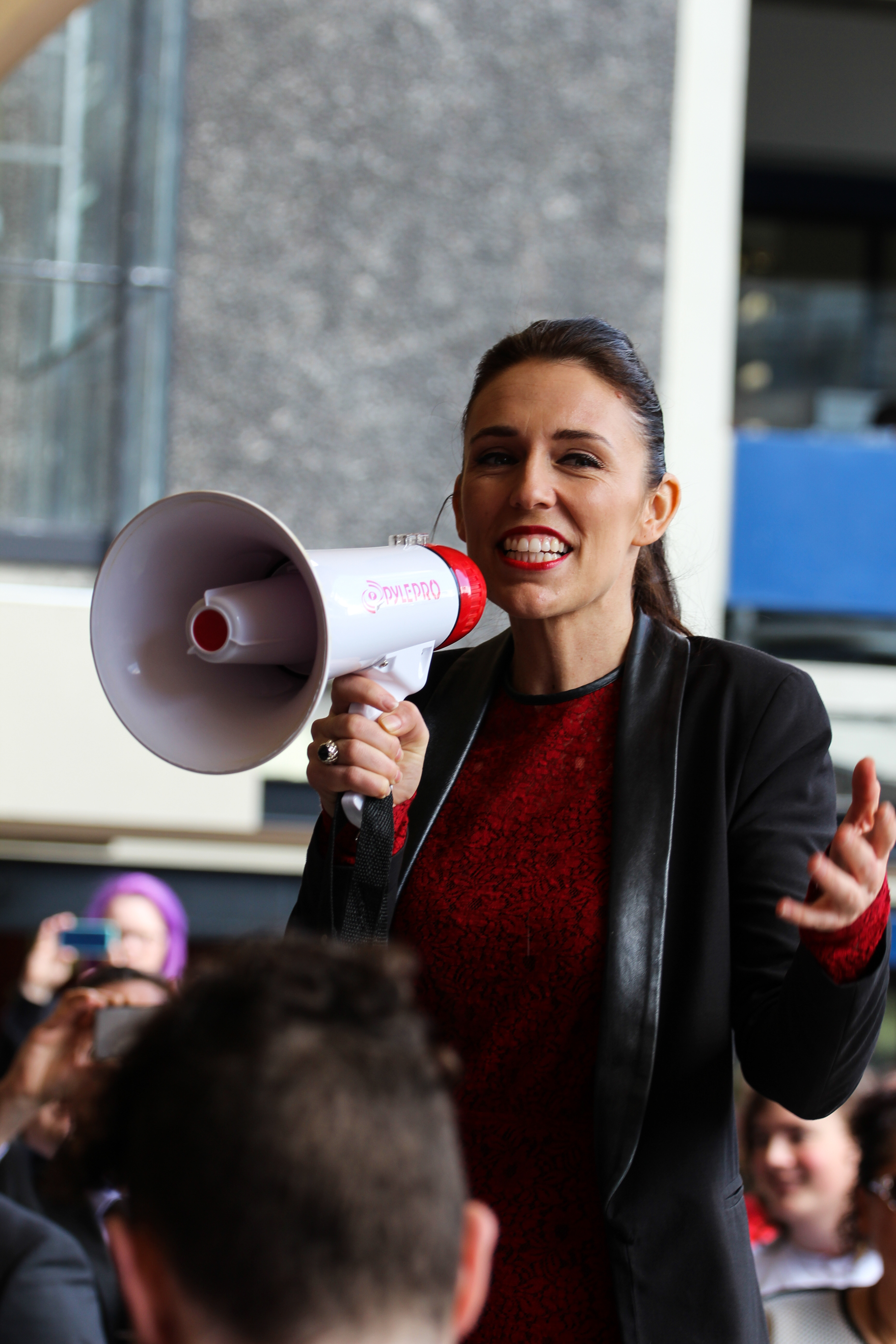
Ardern campaigning at the University of Auckland, 1 September 2017

Labour announced it would reverse the tax cuts included in the 2017 Budget and instead increase Working for Families rates and introduce a new benefit for families with children under 3 years old. It also would introduce a winter heating supplement for people on superannuation and benefits.

On 1 August 2017, party leader Andrew Little resigned on the back of poor opinion polling performance. Deputy leader Jacinda Ardern was unanimously elected leader by the party caucus, while Kelvin Davis was unanimously elected deputy leader to replace Ardern. The leadership change saw a large boost in the Labour Party's support – the party had received $250,000 in donations and signed up 1000 volunteers within 24 hours of the leadership change, according to party secretary Andrew Kirton.

The design for Labour's first tranche of party hoardings was released in early July, featuring both Little and Ardern with the slogan "A fresh approach". After the change of leadership, the new hoardings solely featured Ardern with the new slogan "Let's do this".

On 26 August, Ardern announced a plan to cut fees for visits to doctors. Community Services Card holders would be charged $8 for a visit to a doctor, teenagers would be charged $2, and under–13s would still pay nothing. The cost for an average adult would fall from $42 to $32.

Labour's finance spokesman Grant Robertson announced on 14 September 2017, nine days before the election, that there would be "no new taxes or levies" until after the 2020 election. Any changes arising from its tax working group would not take effect until 2021. Robertson's announcement reversed the position taken by leader Jacinda Ardern who had reserved the right to implement changes before obtaining a mandate at the 2020 election, and came as a Newshub-Reid Research poll showed National rising at the expense of Labour. Labour had gone into the previous two general elections with a capital gains tax policy.

==== Green ====
The Green Party launched its election campaign on 9 July in Nelson. Bryce Edwards writing for The New Zealand Herald claimed the party's policies announced in the run up to the election showed that: "After years of watering down policies and desperately trying to make themselves more respectable to the mainstream, they have made an abrupt shift to the left". One of the major announcements was the party's new radical welfare reform proposals. Social policy academic and welfare campaigner Susan St John gave the social welfare reforms a "definite thumbs up", pointing to two "breathtakingly bold policies" within the reforms. These two aspects included in the reforms were, one: "sole parents to keep their sole parent support when they attempt to repartner. She is the one to say, not WINZ [Work and Income New Zealand], when she is in a partnership in the nature of marriage". A second aspect would be to make "the In–Work Tax Credit available to all low income families".

The party also announced as part of its 'Families Package' it would lower the bottom rate of tax to 9%, introduce a new top rate of tax of 40% on those with an income over $150,000 and increase all core benefits by 20%.

Another policy announced by the party was the proposed introduction of an interim $0.10 per litre excise levy on bottled water. This would be in place until "a proposed working party helped develop a system to charge all commercial water users 'a fair amount'".

On 16 July 2017, co-leader Metiria Turei publicly admitted that she had not disclosed to Work and Income New Zealand that she was accepting rent from flatmates while on the Domestic Purposes Benefit in the early 1990s, and admitted on 3 August 2017 that she had registered a false residential address to vote for a friend who was running in the Mount Albert electorate in 1993. On 7 August 2017, MPs David Clendon and Kennedy Graham announced that they planned to resign as Green Party candidates for the 2017 election, due to Turei's revelations and her handling of the resulting situation. Both Clendon and Graham resigned from the party caucus the following day, after the party made moves to remove them involuntarily.

On 9 August 2017, Turei resigned as co-leader and as a list candidate for the 2017 election, saying that the "scrutiny on [her] family has become unbearable". She campaigned in the Te Tai Tonga Māori electorate, and retired from Parliament at the election. Per their constitution, the Green Party will choose a replacement co-leader at the next annual general meeting in 2018, leaving James Shaw as the sole party leader through the election campaign.

On 21 August 2017, the party promised free public transport for students and those aged under 19, to be achieved by means of a "green card". Green Party transport spokeswoman Julie Anne Genter said the cost of the card would be $70–80 million.

The party announced plans on 2 September 2017 to counter pollution by introducing a tax on farmers of $2 per kilogram of nitrate (fertiliser), which it said would raise about $136 million per year. The party would also distribute funds and allow concessions to the agricultural sector in response to declining water quality.

Leader James Shaw said on 17 September 2017 that the party wanted a capital gains tax, exclusive of the family home, to be implemented in the first year after the election, if Labour and the Greens formed a coalition government. Labour had already said that if it became the government, any capital gains tax recommendations made by its tax working group would not be implemented until after the 2020 election.

==== New Zealand First ====
New Zealand First launched its campaign in Palmerston North on 25 June 2017. Announced policies included ring-fencing GST to the regions it is collected from, writing off student loans of people willing to work outside major centres, cutting net immigration to 10,000 per year, retaining the superannuation age at 65, and holding two binding referendums on whether Māori electorates should be abolished and whether the number of MPs should be reduced to 100.

New Zealand First also campaigned on increasing the minimum wage to $17. They would later increase it to $20.

On 31 August 2017, party leader Winston Peters announced a policy of relocating the Port of Auckland to Marsden Point by 2027. Peters had vowed in July that a Northport rail connection to Marsden Point at a cost of up to $1 billion was non-negotiable in any post–election coalition between NZ First and either National or Labour.

==== Māori ====
The Māori Party election campaign focused on protecting indigenous rights by providing an independent voice for Māori. The party's whānau based policies focuses on obtaining affordable housing to help Māori in low-wage jobs, strengthening employment-support for Māori beneficiaries and making Te Reo Māori and Māori history core curriculum subjects in all schools up to year 10.

The party's policies on rangatiratanga focused on combating climate change in the Pacific to alleviate environmental destruction of our neighbouring Pacific nation and scholarships for Māori and Pasifika students to strengthen recruitment and retention of these students in tertiary institutions.

The party's policies on kāwanatanga focused on protecting freshwater as tāonga and growing iwi economic resources. They released a policy for a new rail scheme called IwiRail which they said would open up the regions to freight and tourism. Since the 2008 general election, the party provided parliamentary support to the Fifth National Government.

In previous elections their policies included improving public transport with fewer emissions, giving tax breaks to lower income earners, taking GST off food products, and banning the use of controversial 1080 poison.

==== ACT ====
Since the 2008 general election, the party provided parliamentary support to the Fifth National Government.

ACT announced policies including tax cuts, with the top personal tax bracket reducing from 33% to 25%, and raising the age of superannuation from 65 to 67 gradually every 2 months starting in 2020.

==== The Opportunities Party (TOP) ====
In taxation, the party proposed to deem a minimum rate of return for all assets (including housing, land and business assets) and charge a tax on it. At the same time, reduce income tax rates so that the total tax take would remain unchanged. The changes would be done gradually to ensure house prices remain stable while incomes grow. The party considered the existing tax regime to favour owners of capital and to over-tax wage earners, to favour home-owners and to disadvantage those who rent their home, and to encourage investment in real estate rather than productive businesses.

They would tighten immigration laws and shift the focus to attracting highly skilled migrants. Criteria for immigrants would involve demonstrating they can help improve the living standards of all New Zealanders, limiting net immigration to 1% population growth per annum (i.e. 47,900 based on June 2017 population), and making access to permanent residency harder and longer.

The party's founder, Gareth Morgan, announced plans to almost halve the number of prison inmates by 2027. Morgan said "New Zealand has some of the world's worst and most outdated criminal justice policies", and to reduce the prison population by 40%, the party wanted to scrap the 'three strikes' law, extend eligibility for the Youth Court to offenders under 20, and increase funding for restorative justice.

==== United Future ====
On 21 August 2017, United Future leader and sole MP Peter Dunne announced that he was quitting politics at the election, citing recent polling and his perception that there was a mood for change in his seat of Ōhāriu. United Future's candidate for the Botany electorate took over as leader shortly after, promising to move his party towards Labour because of its stance on social issues.

=== Major debates ===
Television New Zealand (TVNZ) hosted three television leaders' debates; two between the National and Labour leaders, and one where the leaders of the secondary and minor parties were also invited. The two National-Labour debates were to be moderated by Newstalk ZB and Seven Sharp host Mike Hosking. Hosking withdrew from moderating the multi-party debate due to illness; the debate was instead moderated by 1 News political editor Corin Dann. It also hosted an online debate focusing on young voters and youth issues, moderated by Breakfast host Jack Tame.

To be able to participate in their multiparty leaders debate, TVNZ requires a party to have an MP already in parliament, or be polling above 3% in the most recent One News/Colmar Brunton poll. Polling at 1.9%, new party TOP met neither of those criteria. Party leader Gareth Morgan filed an urgent judicial review, arguing that as he was polling higher than ACT, United Future and the Mãori party (who all fit the criteria by having at least one MP in parliament), his party had a right to be involved in the debates and TOP's exclusion was problematic. The case was heard at the Auckland High Court on 7 September, with the judge ultimately ruling against Morgan.

Three hosted one television leaders' debate between the National and Labour leaders on 4 September. The debate was moderated by Newshub political editor Patrick Gower.

Fairfax again hosted a debate, the Stuff Leaders Debate (formerly called The Press Leaders Debate), between the National and Labour leaders on 7 September. It was moderated by Fairfax's South Island editor-in-chief Joanna Norris and Stuff political editor Tracy Watkins, and was streamed online.

Date	Organiser(s)	Subject	Participants								
Date	Organiser(s)	Subject	National	Labour	Green	NZ First	Māori	ACT	United Future	Mana	TOP
22 August	Māori TV	Māori voters	Absent	Present; Davis	Present; Shaw	Absent	Present; Flavell	Absent	Absent	Present; Harawira	Present; Morgan
26 August	Three		Not invited	Not invited	Present; Shaw	Absent	Present; Fox	Present; Seymour	Absent	Present; Harawira	Present; Morgan
30 August	ASB / Newshub	Finance	Present; Joyce	Present; Robertson	Present; Shaw	Present; Peters	Not invited	Present; Seymour	Not invited	Not invited	Not invited
31 August	TVNZ		Present; English	Present; Ardern	Not invited	Not invited	Not invited	Not invited	Not invited	Not invited	Not invited
4 September	Three		Present; English	Present; Ardern	Not invited	Not invited	Not invited	Not invited	Not invited	Not invited	Not invited
6 September	The Spinoff		Present; Bennett	Present; Davis	Present; Davidson	Present; Jones	Present; Fox	Present; Seymour	Not invited	Not invited	Present; Morgan
7 September	Stuff		Present; English	Present; Ardern	Not invited	Not invited	Not invited	Not invited	Not invited	Not invited	Not invited
8 September	TVNZ		Absent	Absent	Present; Shaw	Absent	Present; Fox	Present; Seymour	Present; Light	Not invited	Not invited
14 September	Stuff	Finance	Present; Joyce	Present; Robertson	Not invited	Not invited	Not invited	Not invited	Not invited	Not invited	Not invited
14 September	TVNZ	Young voters	Present; Bishop	Present; Faafoi	Present; Swarbrick	Present; Ball	Present; Stoddart-Smith	Present; Seymour	Present; Light	Not invited	Not invited
19 September	WWF NZ	Environment	Present; Bayly	Present; Woods	Present; Shaw	Present; O'Rourke	Present; Stoddart-Smith	Absent	Present; Light	Absent	Present; Moore
20 September	TVNZ		Present; English	Present; Ardern	Not invited	Not invited	Not invited	Not invited	Not invited	Not invited	Not invited

=== Endorsements ===
Unlike in some other countries, political endorsements in New Zealand by media and people outside the political sphere are rare. The following people and organisations endorsed parties and candidates:

National Party

- Mark Richardson, radio and television host and former Black Cap

Labour Party

- Jeremy Corbyn, leader of the British Labour Party
- Dick Hubbard, former Mayor of Auckland
- Hollie Smith, singer
- David Tua, boxer
- Guy Williams, comedian
- Anika Moa, singer
- Taika Waititi, filmmaker

Green Party

- Gordon McLauchlan, author
- Guy Williams, comedian

Epsom – David Seymour for ACT

- Bill English, Prime Minister and leader of National Party

Ōhāriu – Peter Dunne for United Future (until his resignation on 21 August 2017)

- Bill English
- Brett Hudson, National Party candidate for Ōhāriu

== Opinion polling ==
Opinion polls have been undertaken periodically since the 2014 election, primarily by MediaWorks New Zealand, Roy Morgan Research, and Television New Zealand. The graph on the left below shows the collated results of all polls for parties that polled above the 5% electoral threshold at the 2014 election; the graph on the right shows results for parties that polled between 1% and 4.9%, or won an electorate seat, at the 2014 election.

=== Seat predictions ===
The use of mixed-member proportional representation allows ready conversion of a party's support into a party vote percentage and therefore a number of seats in Parliament. Projections generally assume no changes to electorate seats each party holds (ACT retains Epsom, Māori retains Waiariki, Labour retains Te Tai Tokerau, etc.) unless there is a specific reason to assume change. For example, after Peter Dunne announced his retirement, projections stopped assuming United Future would retain Ōhāriu. Other parties that do not pass the 5% threshold are assumed not to win an electorate and therefore gain no seats.

Radio New Zealand takes a "poll of polls" average to produce their forecast. The New Zealand Herald bases theirs on a predictive model incorporating poll data as well as past election results and past poll accuracy. Newshub and 1 News and produce projections based on their own polls only.

When determining the scenarios for the overall result, the minimum parties necessary to form majority governments are listed (provided parties have indicated openness to working together). Actual governments formed may include other parties beyond the minimum required for a majority. This happened after the 2014 election, when National only needed one seat from another party to reach a 61-seat majority, but they formed a 64-seat government with Māori, ACT and United Future.

Party	Newshub 13–20 Sep 2017 poll [final]	1 News 15–19 Sep 2017 poll [final]	Roy Morgan 28 Aug–10 Sep 2017 poll [final]	Radio NZ as of 21 Sep 2017 [final]	NZ Herald as of 22 Sep 2017 [final]	Stuff as of 22 Sep 2017 [final]	Official result
National	56	58	50	55	56 (±2)	54	56
Labour	45	46	49	46	47 (±3)	46	46
NZ First	9	6	7	8	9 (±2)	7	9
Green	9	9	11	9	7 (±2)	10	8
ACT	1	1*	1	1	1	1	1
Māori Party	2**	1	2	1	1	1	0
Seats in Parliament	122	121	120	120	120 (Note: The Herald's forecasted numbers are the medians of all likely outcomes for that party. The sum of the parties' forecasted seats does not necessarily equal the total likely seats in Parliament. In this table, "Seats in Parliament" is calculated by adding the number of forecast overhang seats to 120, even if the individual parties' seat projections do not add up to this number.)	120 (Note: Stuff's projected numbers add up to 119, but this outcome is impossible. Calculation (based on exact percentage) shows that 120th and last seat would be allocated to Labour. Taking into account that the polling average have three significant figures it is not possible to decide which party get the last seat.)	120
Overall result (majority)	National−NZ First (65)	National−NZ First (64)	Labour−Green−Māori (62)	National–NZ First (63)	National–NZ First (65)	National–NZ First (61)	National–NZ First (65)
Overall result (majority)	Labour−Green−NZ First (63)	Labour−Green−NZ First (61)	Labour−Green−Māori (62)	Labour−Green−NZ First (63)	Labour−Green–NZ First (62)	Labour−Green–NZ First (63)	Labour−Green–NZ First (63)

* indicates an overhang seat

== Post-election events ==
=== Leadership changes ===
Metiria Turei stepped down as co-leader of the Green Party during the campaign period and the party did not elect a replacement before the election. In 2018 she was succeeded by Marama Davidson.

=== Local by-elections ===
The following local by-elections were required due to the resignation of an incumbent local body politician following their election to Parliament:

- Hastings by-elections, Hastings District Council: Two by-elections were held in Hastings in 2017 after the resignations of Mayor Lawrence Yule who was elected MP for Tukituki and councillor Adrienne Pierce, who stood down from the council in August to contest Palmerston North for National. Sitting councillor and deputy mayor Sandra Hazlehurst won the election to fill Yule's vacancy, necessitating a subsequent by-election in 2018.
- Southern Ward by-election, Wellington City Council: Deputy Mayor of Wellington Paul Eagle resigned his seat on the council after he was elected MP for Rongotai, necessitating a council by-election in the Southern Ward.
- Bay of Islands–Whangaroa Ward by-election, Far North District Council: Councillor Willow-Jean Prime resigned to take her place as a Labour Party List MP. The by-election to replace her was held in February 2018, with Kelly Stratford defeating former Green MP David Clendon.
- Auckland by-elections, Auckland Council: By-elections were held in 2018 to fill vacancies on the Maungakiekie-Tamaki Ward and the Manurewa Local Board when Denise Lee and Simeon Brown were elected as Members of Parliament for Maungakiekie and Pakuranga, respectively.

=== Electoral offences ===
On 2 October 2017, the Electoral Commission referred four alleged electoral offences to Police. These all involved social media posts of electoral statements during the election silence period of midnight to 7:00pm on election day – a breach of section 197(1)(g)(i) of the Electoral Act. Two of these incidents concerned Sean Plunket, the communications director of The Opportunities Party. On 18 October 2017, the Electoral Commission referred a subsequent offence to Police about TVNZ re-broadcasting a bulletin of Te Karere during the silence period.

=== Election donations ===
On 13 May 2021, the Serious Fraud Office charged six people in relation to election donations made to the Labour Party during the 2017 general election. The six individuals are all charged with obtaining at least NZ$34,840 by deception or without claim of right, with the donation being paid to the Labour Party via an intermediary bank account.

In late July 2022, the NZ$34,840 Labour Party donation court case was combined with a second case involving two donations worth NZ$100,000 each that were made to the National Party between 2017 and 2018. Seven defendants were charged in the two combined political donations cases. Four of the defendants were named as former National MP and Advance New Zealand founder Jami-Lee Ross, and businessmen Yikun Zhang, Shijia (Colin) Zheng, Hengjia (Joe) Zheng. All defendants pleaded not guilty to charges of assisting Zhang in concealing his political donations. Under the Electoral Act 1993, all donations worth more than NZ$15,000 must be reported to the Electoral Commission. The trial is scheduled to last ten weeks. The Crown has summoned 51 witnesses including former National MP Simon Bridges, Labour MPs Andrew Little and Michael Wood, former Labour President Nigel Haworth, the National Party's general manager Greg Hamilton, Lee-Ross's wife Lucy Schwaner and his assistant Katja Kershaw.

In early September 2022, lawyers for the defendants delivered closing arguments. Closing arguments ranged from asserting that the defendants had not broken electoral law, were unaware of Electoral Act requirements, or that defendants were unaware of the alleged scheme to conceal large donations. Ross's lawyer Ron Mansfield KC also argued that Ross had lied to the Serious Fraud Office in an attempt to implicate former National leader Bridges.

In early October 2022, High Court Justice Ian Gault delivered his verdict. While Ross was acquitted of the fraud charges relating to the National and Labour parties' donations, Yikun Zhang was convicted of a 2018 donation made to the National Party. Colin Zheng was also convicted over the 2017 and 2018 donations to the National Party while his brother Joe Zheng was convicted over the 2018 donation to the National Party and obstructing a Serious Fraud Office investigation. In addition Zhang, the Zheng brothers and three people with name suppression were acquitted in relations to donations made to the Labour Party in 2017.

== See also ==
- Elections in New Zealand
- Politics in New Zealand
- List of political parties in New Zealand
