= Social Media (Age-Restricted Users) Bill =

Proposed New Zealand social media age restriction legislation

New Zealand Parliament
- Territorial extent: New Zealand
- Introduced by: Catherine Wedd
- Introduced: 6 May 2025

Summary
- Bans those younger than 16 years of age from having an account on social media services
- Status: Halted

The Social Media (Age-Restricted Users) Bill is a member's bill by National Party Member of Parliament of New Zealand Catherine Wedd that seeks to ban children under the age of 16 years from accessing social media by forcing social media companies to implement age verification measures. It is modelled after the Australian government's Online Safety Amendment Act 2024. In mid October 2025, the New Zealand Parliament confirmed plans to introduce the social media age restriction bill.

== Background ==
In late November 2024, the Albanese government of Australia, with support from the opposition Coalition parties, passed the Online Safety Amendment creating a world-first age verification regime targeting social media platforms operating in the country. The ban targets several social media platforms including Facebook, Instagram, Kick, Reddit, Snapchat, Threads, TikTok, Twitch, X (formerly Twitter) and YouTube. These platforms were required to implement age verification systems and to remove under-age users by 10 December 2025, when the law change came into effect.

== Draft provisions ==
The draft Social Media (Age-Restricted Users) Bill defines social media platforms as electronic platforms that enable social media interactions between two or more end-users, facilitates communication between multiple end-users and allows users to post content on the platform. The proposed bill requires social media companies to take action to prevent users under the age of 16 from creating accounts on their platforms. It also creates a framework for courts to impose fines on platforms that fail to take reasonable steps to prevent underaged users from accessing the platform.

== Legislative history ==
=== Draft legislation ===
On 6 May 2025, Wedd announced a private member's bill called the "Social Media (Age-Restricted Users) Bill" that would bar access to social media platforms for people under the age of 16 years. She said that she was motivated as the mother of four children to support families, parents and teachers' efforts to manage their children's online exposure and the passage of the Australian Online Safety Amendment legislation in December 2024. Since National's coalition partner ACT New Zealand had refused to support the bill, the Sixth National Government announce it as a member's bill rather than a government bill. Prime Minister Christopher Luxon has confirmed that National would seek cross-party support for the legislation. ACT MP and the Minister of Internal Affairs Brooke van Velden said that the Government would watch the implementation of the Australian social media age restriction policy.

In October 2025, Wedd's bill was drawn from the parliamentary ballot. In addition, Labour Reuben Davidson drafted a similar member's bill that would hold social media providers responsible for restricting "harmful content" and imposed NZ$50,000 fines for non-compliance. In November 2025, Luxon reiterated his support for social media age restriction legislation and said the New Zealand government would introduce a bill in 2026 before the 2026 New Zealand general election. He also confirmed that Education Minister Erica Stanford was leading an investigation into what lessons could be learnt from the Australian legislation.

At the request of ACT MP Parmjeet Parmar, Parliament's Education and Workforce Committee held an inquiry into a proposed social media ban in early October 2025. The committee was led by National MP Carl Bates and received 430 submissions from 400 groups and individuals. The committee also heard from 87 in-person submissions. On 10 December 2025, the committee made 12 recommendations including restricting social media access to persons under the age of 16, re-evaluating existing legislation such as the Films, Videos, and Publications Classification Act and the Harmful Digital Communications Act 2015, and regulating online platforms and Internet service providers. The ACT party released a dissenting view disagreeing with the need for a law restricting social media access to under-16 year olds.

In mid-May 2026, the Government confirmed that work on the proposed bill to ban under-16 year olds from social media had been paused. The New Zealand Parliament held a debate on the proposed bill on 13 May following a select committee inquiry into the harms caused by social media platforms. While the opposition Labour Party has agreed to support the member's bill, the ACT and Green parties opposed the proposed bill on the grounds that the rules were easy to circumvent, that at-risk groups could become more isolated, and that social media also harmed other age groups.

By mid-July 2026, the New Zealand First party had voiced opposition to the progression of the social media age ban. With the National Party's coalition partners ACT and NZ First opposed to the proposed legislation, Education Minister Erica Stanford confirmed that her party and government officials were seeking support from the opposition Labour Party to further progress the legislation into law. Stanford also denied NZ First's claims that the New Zealand government was considering introducing digital IDs or a ban on VPNs. In late July 2026, Labour's science, technology and innovation spokesperson Reuben Davidson expressed concern that he had been unable to share a copy of the bill with his fellow Labour MPs. Stanford said that she had given Labour plenty of opportunities to see the proposed legislation and that she could not share the bill for legal reasons.

== Responses ==
=== Academia and civil society ===
In late July 2025, the New Zealand Council for Civil Liberties (NZCCL) expressed concern that the proposed social media age restriction could infringe upon the New Zealand Bill of Rights Act 1990, the Privacy Act 2020 and the United Nations' Convention on the Rights of the Child. The NZCCL also questioned the practicality of age verification software, a social media age limit and whether it would fulfil its stated goal of combating online harm.

In August 2025, University of Auckland criminologist and senior lecturer Claire Meehan expressed concern that the social media age restriction legislation would cut children from their friendship and support networks. She also said that children and young people were digital natives who could use VPNs to circumvent the ban. Similar sentiments were echoed by Victoria University of Wellington media and communications lecturer Alex Beattie and "Ocean Today" Instagram social media influencer "Charlie."

In October 2025, New Zealand Initiative representative Dr Eric Crampton expressed concern that a social media age restriction would involve the introduction of digital IDs. He argued that a new law was unnecessary and said that parents could limit their children's exposure to social media via Google Family Link and Apple's equivalent. Similarly, Institute of Economic Affairs public policy fellow Matthew Lesh and the British Free Speech Union expressed concerns that young people could use VPNs to circumvent a social media ban, citing the spike in VPN usage in the United Kingdom following the passage of the Online Safety Act 2023.

The advocacy group B416's co-chair Anna Curzon advocated for a social media ban on underage users, stating that social media apps "are made to be addictive" and made it difficult for parents to relate with their children. In late November 2025, B416's co-founder Anna Mowbray expressed support for the Government's social media age restriction bill but expressed disappointment that Luxon had not timed his announcement with the launch of the group's campaign.

Generation-Z Aotearoa co-founder Lola Fisher has called on the New Zealand Government to consult with young people on the development of the legislation.

=== Government agencies and departments ===
In early October 2025, Privacy Commissioner Michael Webster expressed concern that social media platforms requiring users to prove their age via digital IDs could raise privacy concerns. Webster suggested that age verification systems could relay on various documents including passports. He said that age estimation technologies had high error rates and that age inference technologies relied on data mining.

=== Political parties ===
In early May 2025, the National Party government expressed support for a social media age restriction legislation. By contrast, its coalition partner ACT has opposed such legislation. ACT leader David Seymour described the ban as hasty and unworkable since it did not involve parents. Meanwhile, New Zealand First leader Winston Peters expressed support for a social media age restriction but said the bill should be subject to a select committee inquiry.

The opposition Labour Party leader Chris Hipkins has expressed interest in a social media age restriction legislation but emphasised the need for consensus. Meanwhile, Green Party co-leader Chlöe Swarbrick said she wanted to learn more about the bill but described it as simplistic. Fellow Greens co-leader Marama Davidson said that the proposed bill would punish children and young people for the harm caused by big tech platforms.

=== Tech companies ===
In early October 2025, representatives of TikTok and Meta Platforms cautioned against proposed social media ban on under-16 years olds. During a one-day parliamentary inquiry, Ella Woods-Joyce, TikTok's public policy lead for Australia and New Zealand, and Mia Garlick, Meta's regional director of policy, expressed concern that the social media age restriction could send children and young people to less regulated online spaces. Woods-Joyce highlighted TikTok's policy of closing down accounts belonging to users under the age of 13 years while Garlick highlighted Meta's policy of placing users under the age of 16 in private accounts by default.

In early February 2026 Meta's vice president and global head of safety, Antigone Davis, argued against a proposed social media age ban during a visit to an Instagram safety camp in Auckland. She also promoted the company's proposed "Teen Accounts" which she argued would address parents' safety concerns.

=== Public opinion polling ===
In June 2025, a RNZ–Reid Research poll found that 57.8% of respondents supported a social media ban for under-16 year olds. 31.6% opposed such a ban while 10.6% said they did not know. In terms of party support, 75.1% of National Party voters supported the ban, followed by 69.6% of New Zealand First voters, 55.5% of ACT voters, 46.7% of Labour voters, 43.7% of Green voters and 42.2% of Te Pāti Māori voters.

In October 2025, the annual Ipsos Education Monitor found that 72% of New Zealand respondents supported a social media ban on children under the age of 14. The poll sampled 1,000 respondents in New Zealand.
