= Tukituki (electorate) =

- Single-member general constituency for the New Zealand House of Representatives
- Interactive map of boundaries from the 2026 election
- Formation: 1996
- Region: Hawke's Bay
- Territorial authority: Hastings District; Central Hawke's Bay District
- Character: Urban and rural
- Term: 3 years

Member for Tukituki
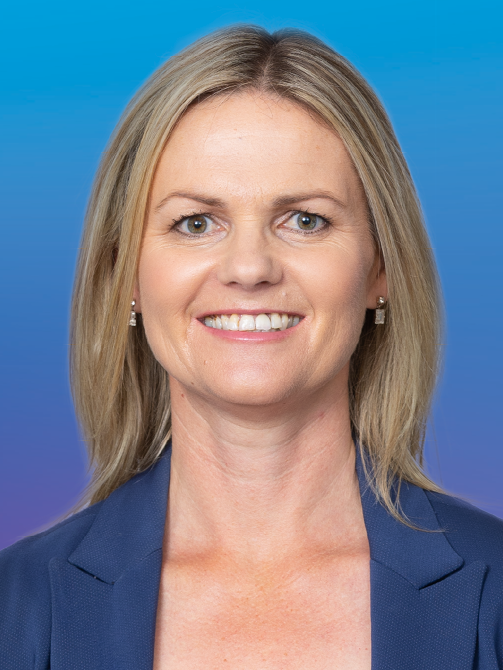
- Catherine Wedd since 14 October 2023
- Party: National
- Electorate office: Hastings
- Previous MP: Anna Lorck (Labour)
Party vote distribution

Tukituki is a New Zealand parliamentary electorate in Hawke's Bay. It returns one member of Parliament to the New Zealand House of Representatives. It was established for the 1996 general election and is named after the Tukituki River. Neighbouring electorates are Napier to the north, Wairarapa to the south, and Rangitīkei over the ranges to the west.

The current member of Parliament is Catherine Wedd of the National Party, who won the seat from first-term Labour MP Anna Lorck at the 2023 general election.

== Population centres ==
Map of boundaries at the 2020 and 2023 general elections

Tukituki was created ahead of the change to mixed-member proportional (MMP) voting at the 1996 election; it was a merger of the old Hastings seat with Central Hawke's Bay District. Tukituki centres on the southern Hawke's Bay region, with the bulk of the electorate's population coming from the city of Hastings, with the rural towns of Havelock North, Flaxmere, Clive and Ōtāne, and the coastal communities of Haumoana, Te Awanga, Ocean Beach and Waimārama drafted in to bring the electorate up to the required population. In 2008, a general northwards tug on boundaries in the Taranaki, Manawatū-Whanganui and Hawke's Bay regions saw Waipukurau and Waipawa moved into the Wairarapa electorate, in exchange for which Tukituki gained the suburbs and towns around Cape Kidnappers from the Napier electorate. No boundary adjustments were undertaken in the subsequent 2013/14 and 2020 redistributions. In the 2025 boundary review, the electorate lost the rural communities north of the Ngaruroro River to Napier.

== History ==
Labour's Rick Barker, who had represented Hastings since 1993, was elected as MP, and re-elected twice. National's Craig Foss first contested the electorate in the 2002 election, but Barker comfortably held it. Ranked 47th on National's party list, Foss did not enter Parliament.

With a large provincial swing to the National Party in the 2005 election, Foss took the seat. This was the third time in over thirty years that a Hastings electorate had elected a National MP – the other two times being National's landslide victories in 1975 and 1990. Foss was returned to Parliament with a greatly increased majority in the 2008 election. His majority increased to nearly 10,000 votes in the 2011 election. In the 2014 election, his majority dropped to 6,490 votes. Foss quit politics at the 2017 general election and Lawrence Yule was elected, retaining it for the National Party.

Anna Lorck narrowly took the seat off of Yule in the 2020 election, returning it to Labour after 15 years with National.

The 2023 election saw Catherine Wedd re-capture the electorate back from Labour for National. Hawke's Bay Today described it as part of a "blue wave" across Hawke's Bay; Wedd overturned a 1,590 Labour majority, with a margin of 10,118 votes.

=== Members of Parliament ===
Key

Labour National

Election	Winner
1996 election	Rick Barker
1999 election	Rick Barker
2002 election	Rick Barker
2005 election	Craig Foss
2008 election	Craig Foss
2011 election	Craig Foss
2014 election	Craig Foss
2017 election	Lawrence Yule
2020 election	Anna Lorck
2023 election	Catherine Wedd

=== List MPs ===
Members of Parliament elected from party lists in elections where that person also unsuccessfully contested the Tukituki electorate. Unless otherwise stated, all MPs terms began and ended at general elections.

Election	Winner
2005 election	Rick Barker
2008 election	Rick Barker

== Election results ==
=== 2026 election ===
The next election will be held on 7 November 2026. Candidates for Tukituki are listed at Candidates in the 2026 New Zealand general election by electorate § Tukituki. Official results will be available after 27 November 2026.

=== 2023 election ===
2023 general election: Tukituki
Notes:	Blue background denotes the winner of the electorate vote. Pink background denotes a candidate elected from their party list. Yellow background denotes an electorate win by a list member, or other incumbent. A ✓ or ✗ denotes status of any incumbent, win or lose respectively.						
Party	Candidate	Votes	%	±%	Party votes	%	±%
National	Catherine Wedd	21,981	53.5%	—	17,165	41.3%	
Labour	✗ Anna Lorck	11,863	28.9%		10,518	25.3%	
Green	Nick Ratcliffe	2,383	5.8%	—	3,284	7.9%	
ACT	Rob Douglas	2,016	4.9%	—	5,117	12.3%	
NZ Loyal	Rob Hulman	1,030	2.5%	—	620	1.5%	
Legalise Cannabis	Romana (Marnz) Manning	631	1.5%		228	0.5%	
Independent	Michael Ngahuka	379	0.9%	—			
Independent	Melanie Lorraine Petrowski	181	0.4%				
Independent	Allister David Tosh	66	0.2%				
Independent	Michael Ponk	45	0.1%				
Animal Justice					68	0.2%	
DemocracyNZ					71	0.2%	
Freedoms NZ					123	0.3%	
Leighton Baker Party					35	0.1%	
New Conservatives					64	0.2%	
New Nation					14	0.0%	
NZ First					2550	6.1%	
NewZeal					432	1.0%	
Te Pāti Māori					410	1.0%	
Opportunities					587	1.4%	
Women's Rights					39	0.1%	
Informal votes		507			264		
Total valid votes		41,082			41,589		
Turnout		41,863					
National gain from Labour	Majority	10118	+24.2%				

=== 2020 election ===
2020 general election: Tukituki
Notes:	Blue background denotes the winner of the electorate vote. Pink background denotes a candidate elected from their party list. Yellow background denotes an electorate win by a list member, or other incumbent. A ✓ or ✗ denotes status of any incumbent, win or lose respectively.						
Party	Candidate	Votes	%	±%	Party votes	%	±%
Labour	Anna Lorck	19,132	45.51	+5.38	20,300	47.93	+13.90
National	✗ Lawrence Yule	17,542	41.72	−5.70	12,524	29.57	−19.46
Green	Chris Perley	1,808	4.30	−0.83	2,273	5.36	0.26
ACT	Jan Daffern	1,051	2.50	—	3,745	8.84	+8.50
New Conservative	Nick McMinn-Collard	685	1.62	+1.08	902	2.12	+1.79
Legalise Cannabis	Marnz Manning	521	1.23	—	204	0.48	+0.17
Advance NZ	Carl Peterson	336	0.79	—	396	0.93	—
ONE	Melanie Lorraine Petrowski	175	0.41	—	104	0.24	—
Future Youth	Allister David Tosh	50	0.11	−0.10			
NZ First					869	2.05	−5.78
Opportunities					454	1.07	−0.87
Māori Party					162	0.38	+0.03
Outdoors					33	0.07	+0.01
Sustainable NZ					25	0.05	—
Social Credit					20	0.04	−0.01
Vision NZ					19	0.04	—
TEA					5	0.01	—
Heartland					5	0.01	—
Informal votes		737			309		
Total valid votes		42,037			42,349		
Turnout		42,349					
Labour gain from National	Majority	1,590	3.78	−3.52			

=== 2017 election ===
2017 general election: Tukituki
Notes:	Blue background denotes the winner of the electorate vote. Pink background denotes a candidate elected from their party list. Yellow background denotes an electorate win by a list member, or other incumbent. A ✓ or ✗ denotes status of any incumbent, win or lose respectively.						
Party	Candidate	Votes	%	±%	Party votes	%	±%
National	Lawrence Yule	18,280	47.42	−4.58	19,166	49.03	−2.78
Labour	Anna Lorck	15,467	40.13	+6.33	13,302	34.03	11.27
NZ First	Joe Kairau	2,027	5.26	—	3,062	7.83	+0.17
Green	Chris Perley	1,977	5.13	−0.92	1,993	5.1	−3.44
Conservative	Roger Larkins	209	0.54	−4.85	129	0.33	−6.21
Future Youth	Allister David Tosh	82	0.21	—			
Democrats	Dick Ryan	51	0.13	−0.14	18	0.05	±0
Opportunities					758	1.94	—
Māori Party					135	0.35	−0.16
ACT					134	0.34	−0.06
Legalise Cannabis					123	0.31	−0.11
Ban 1080					40	0.1	−0.04
United Future					33	0.08	−0.08
People's Party					30	0.08	—
Outdoors					24	0.06	—
Mana					9	0.02	−0.66 (Note: 2017 Mana Party swing is relative to the votes for Internet-Mana in 2014; it shared a party list with the Internet Party in the 2014 election)
Internet					6	0.02	−0.66 (Note: 2017 Internet Party swing is relative to the votes for Internet-Mana in 2014; it shared a party list with Mana Party in the 2014 election)
Informal votes		454			128		
Total valid votes		38,547			39,090		
National hold	Majority	2,813	7.3	−10.9			

=== 2014 election ===
2014 general election: Tukituki
Notes:	Blue background denotes the winner of the electorate vote. Pink background denotes a candidate elected from their party list. Yellow background denotes an electorate win by a list member, or other incumbent. A ✓ or ✗ denotes status of any incumbent, win or lose respectively.						
Party	Candidate	Votes	%	±%	Party votes	%	±%
National	✓ Craig Foss	18,537	52.00	−6.42	18,680	51.81	−0.79
Labour	Anna Lorck	12,047	33.80	+4.50	8,205	22.76	−1.38
Green	Chris Perley	2,156	6.05	−0.94	3,078	8.54	−1.12
Conservative	Stephen Jenkinson	1,920	5.39	+2.14	2,357	6.54	+2.74
Legalise Cannabis	Romana (Marnz) Manning	355	0.96	−0.08	150	0.42	−0.16
ACT	Duncan Lennox	163	0.46	−0.30	144	0.40	−1.06
Democrats	Dick Ryan	97	0.27	+0.05	18	0.05	+0.01
NZ First					2,357	7.66	+1.81
Internet Mana					244	0.68	+0.34
Māori Party					185	0.51	−0.26
United Future					59	0.16	−0.49
Ban 1080					50	0.14	+0.14
Civilian					12	0.03	+0.03
Focus					5	0.01	+0.01
Independent Coalition					4	0.01	+0.01
Informal votes		368			135		
Total valid votes		35,643			36,057		
National hold	Majority	6,490	18.20	−11.18			

=== 2011 election ===
2011 general election: Tukituki
Notes:	Blue background denotes the winner of the electorate vote. Pink background denotes a candidate elected from their party list. Yellow background denotes an electorate win by a list member, or other incumbent. A ✓ or ✗ denotes status of any incumbent, win or lose respectively.						
Party	Candidate	Votes	%	±%	Party votes	%	±%
National	✓ Craig Foss	19,378	58.42	+1.24	17,935	52.60	+2.36
Labour	Julia Haydon-Carr	9,718	29.30	−5.67	8,231	24.14	−8.01
Green	Jim MacDonald	2,319	6.99	+1.89	3,294	9.66	+3.64
Conservative	Stephen Jenkinson	1,078	3.25	+3.25	1,296	3.80	+3.80
Legalise Cannabis	Romana (Marnz) Manning	352	1.06	+1.06	198	0.58	+0.22
ACT	Robert Burnside	252	0.76	−0.73	498	1.46	−2.89
Democrats	Barry Pulford	74	0.22	+0.02	15	0.04	−0.02
NZ First					1,995	5.85	+2.68
Māori Party					263	0.77	−0.10
United Future					220	0.65	+0.10
Mana					117	0.34	+0.34
Libertarianz					19	0.06	+0.03
Alliance					17	0.05	−0.04
Informal votes		787			225		
Total valid votes		33,171			34,098		
National hold	Majority	9,660	29.12	+6.90			

Electorate (as at 26 November 2011): 44,708

=== 2008 election ===
2008 general election: Tukituki
Notes:	Blue background denotes the winner of the electorate vote. Pink background denotes a candidate elected from their party list. Yellow background denotes an electorate win by a list member, or other incumbent. A ✓ or ✗ denotes status of any incumbent, win or lose respectively.						
Party	Candidate	Votes	%	±%	Party votes	%	±%
National	✓ Craig Foss	20,103	57.18		17,904	50.24	
Labour	Rick Barker	12,292	34.96		11,457	32.15	
Green	Quentin Duthie	1,792	5.10		2,146	6.02	
ACT	Duncan Lennox	523	1.49		1,552	4.35	
Progressive	Dawn Patchett	270	0.77		309	0.87	
Alliance	Thomas O'Neill	104	0.30		32	0.09	
Democrats	Barry Pulford	73	0.21		22	0.06	
NZ First					1,129	3.17	
Māori Party					310	0.87	
United Future					196	0.55	–
Bill and Ben					187	0.52	
Kiwi					135	0.38	
Legalise Cannabis					127	0.36	
Family Party					63	0.18	
Pacific					37	0.10	
Workers Party					14	0.04	
Libertarianz					10	0.03	
RAM					5	0.01	
RONZ					4	0.01	
Informal votes		284			134		
Total valid votes		35,157			35,639		
National hold	Majority	7,811	22.22				

=== 2005 election ===
2005 general election: Tukituki
Notes:	Blue background denotes the winner of the electorate vote. Pink background denotes a candidate elected from their party list. Yellow background denotes an electorate win by a list member, or other incumbent. A ✓ or ✗ denotes status of any incumbent, win or lose respectively.						
Party	Candidate	Votes	%	±%	Party votes	%	±%
National	Craig Foss	17,239	49.31	+17.83	16,487	46.50	
Labour	✗ Rick Barker	14,837	42.44	−9.47	13,353	37.66	
Green	Liz Earth	1,171	3.35		1,373	3.87	
United Future	Jocelyn Smith	670	1.92		856	2.41	
Māori Party	Ngahiwi Tomoana	541	1.55		256	0.72	
ACT	John Ormond	456	1.30		407	1.15	
Direct Democracy	Scott Burch	49	0.14		10	0.03	
NZ First					1,852	5.22	
Progressive					458	1.29	
Destiny					183	0.52	
Legalise Cannabis					87	0.25	
Christian Heritage					50	0.14	
Alliance					22	0.06	
99 MP					14	0.04	
Democrats					13	0.04	
One NZ					10	0.03	
Libertarianz					8	0.02	
Family Rights					6	0.02	
RONZ					3	0.01	
Informal votes		329			135		
Total valid votes		34,963			35,454		
National gain from Labour	Majority	2,402	6.87	+27.30			

=== 1999 election ===
Refer to Candidates in the New Zealand general election 1999 by electorate#Tukituki for a list of candidates.
