= Bare Island (New Zealand) =

Island in New Zealand

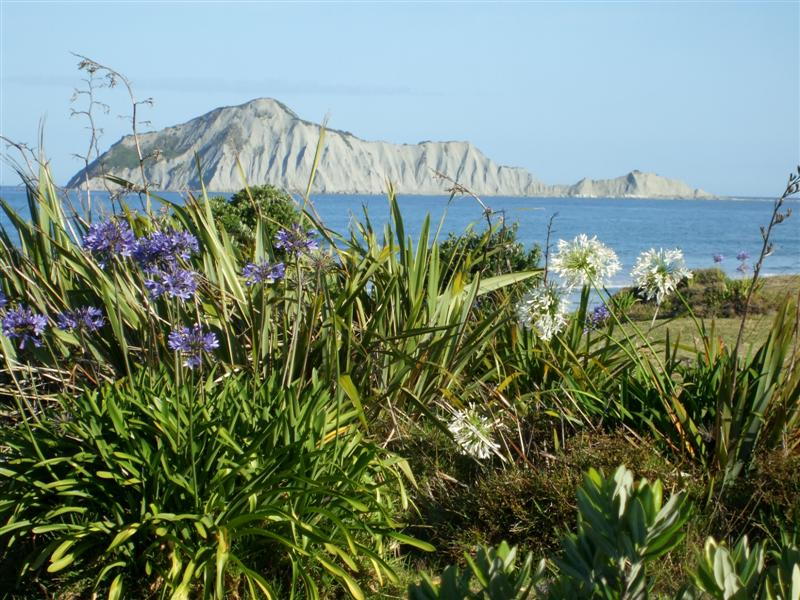
- Bare Island as seen from the mainland
- Interactive map of Bare Island

Geography
- Location: Pacific Ocean
- Coordinates: 39.833125°S 177.027589°E
- Area: 15 ha (37 acres)
- Highest elevation: 106 m (348 ft)

Administration
- New Zealand

Demographics
- Population: 0

Bare Island Māori: Te Motu-o-Kura is a small island located in the Pacific Ocean in the southern Hawke's Bay Region on the eastern shores of the North Island of New Zealand. It is located 2 kilometres (1.2 mi) off the North island coast, near Waimārama, 25 kilometres (16 mi) south of Cape Kidnappers.

On the south-west side of the island, there is an aquifer exuding fresh water (called Nga Puhake-o-te-ora or "the burp of life"). From the shore the island is bare, but from the seaward side, there is enough cover to provide resting sites for blue penguins and sooty shearwaters.

When Jules Dumont d'Urville sailed past in 1827 he reported houses and boats on the seaward side.

Following the passage of the Heretaunga Tamatea Claims Settlement Act 2018, the name of the island was officially altered to Motu o Kura / Bare Island.

== The legend of Motu-o-Kura ==
The New Zealand Ministry for Culture and Heritage gives a translation of "island of Kura" for Motu-O-Kura. According to Māori legend, Kura was a mighty woman who, during times of siege, would dive down to obtain fresh water from the aquifer behind the island under the ocean in the place called Te Puhake o te Ora (well of living waters) as there is no fresh water found on Motu o Kura.

== See also ==
- List of islands of New Zealand
- List of islands
- Desert island
