= Craig Foss =

New Zealand investment banker and politician

The Honourable Craig Foss
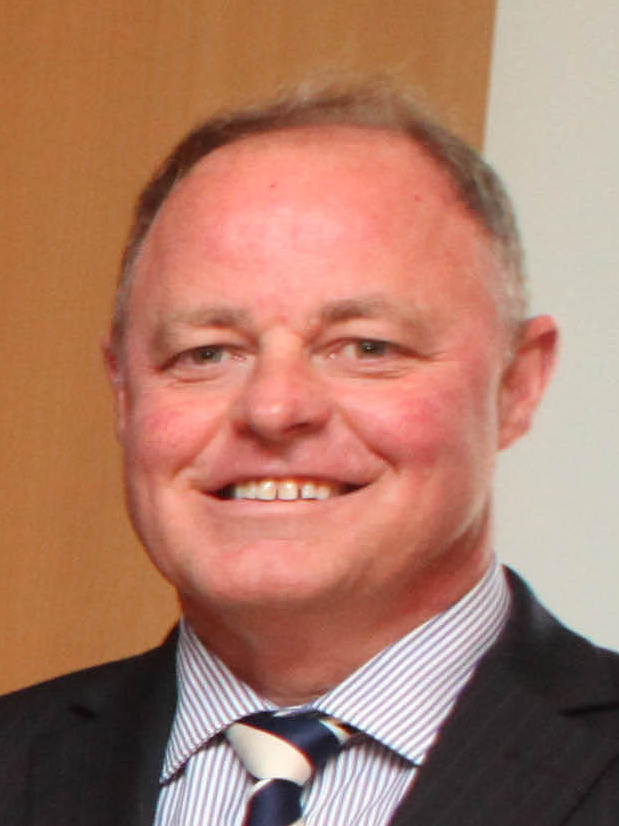
- Foss in 2013

Minister of Civil Defence
- In office 8 June 2011 – 22 January 2013
- Prime Minister: John Key
- Preceded by: John Carter
- Succeeded by: Nikki Kaye

10th Minister for Senior Citizens
- In office 8 June 2011 – 14 December 2011
- Prime Minister: John Key
- Preceded by: John Carter
- Succeeded by: Jo Goodhew

Member of the New Zealand Parliament for Tukituki
- In office 17 September 2005 – 23 September 2017
- Preceded by: Rick Barker
- Succeeded by: Lawrence Yule
- Majority: 2,402 (2005)

Personal details
- Born: 4 July 1963 (age 63) Lower Hutt, Wellington
- Party: National
- Spouse: Kristal Foss
- Children: Two daughters
- Profession: Investment banker
- Website: craigfoss.co.nz

Craig Raymond Robert Foss (born 4 July 1963) is a New Zealand investment banker and politician. He was elected to the Hawke's Bay Regional Council in October 2019 and was previously the Member of Parliament for Tukituki from 2005 until 2017.

== Early years and family ==
Foss was born on 4 July 1963 in Lower Hutt, the son of Raymond Foss and Rosemary Dwyer. He went to high school at Naenae College, then attended Victoria University of Wellington, completing a BCA. He worked in the banking sector. He was Chief Dealer for the Bank of New Zealand. Subsequently, he worked for Credit Suisse Financial Products as Interest Rate Risk Manager in London and Tokyo.

Foss married Kristal in 1993; they have two daughters together. Foss owns a small farm and some tourist accommodation.

== Political career ==
=== Member of Parliament ===
New Zealand Parliament
Years	Term	Electorate	List	Party
2005–2008	48th	Tukituki	44	National
2008–2011	49th	Tukituki	33	National
2011–2014	50th	Tukituki	21	National
2014–2017	51st	Tukituki	17	National

Foss represented the Tukituki electorate for twelve years but was not successful in winning the electorate at his first attempt. In the 2002 election, he was beaten by Labour's incumbent, Rick Barker, by 6,410 votes. He was ranked 47th on the National Party list, not high enough to enter Parliament as a list MP.

Foss contested Tukituki again in 2005 and defeated Barker to enter Parliament for the first time. He was returned for three further elections and his majority peaking at nearly 10,000 votes in 2011. Foss voted in favour of the Marriage (Definition of Marriage) Amendment Act 2013.

The National Party formed a government in 2008. Foss was the chair of the Finance and Expenditure Committee from 2008 until June 2011, when he was appointed a minister outside Cabinet. He held the Civil Defence, Racing and Senior Citizens portfolios, as well as associate ministerial responsibilities in local government and commerce, replacing John Carter who left to take up a High Commissioner post in the Cook Islands.

After the 2011 election, Foss was promoted to be a minister inside the Cabinet, as Minister of Broadcasting and Minister of Commerce. He was also an associate minister in the education and ACC portfolios. As associate minister of education, Foss had responsibility for the ill-fated rollout of Novopay. In January 2013 he was removed from the education portfolio and reassigned to be Minister of Consumer Affairs. In this term he also held brief acting appointments as Minister for Climate Change Issues, after the 2012 resignation of Nick Smith, and as Minister for ACC, after the 2014 resignation of Judith Collins.

National was elected for a third term in 2014, and Foss was appointed Minister for Small Business, Minister of Statistics, Minister of Veterans' Affairs, Associate Minister of Immigration, and Associate Minister of Transport, but no longer served in the Cabinet. On 14 December 2016, following a change to the National Party leadership, Foss announced that he would retire from politics at the 2017 general election. He relinquished his ministerial roles on 20 December 2016. The Tukituki electorate was won at the election by Lawrence Yule, who had succeeded Foss as the National Party's candidate.

=== Local government ===
Foss was elected to the Hawke's Bay Regional Council in the 2019 New Zealand local elections, alongside his former parliamentary rival Rick Barker.

New Zealand Parliament
Preceded by Rick Barker	Member of Parliament for Tukituki; 2005–2017	Succeeded by Lawrence Yule
Political offices
Preceded by John Carter	Minister for Senior Citizens; 2011	Succeeded by Jo Goodhew
Preceded by Simon Power	Minister of Commerce; 2011–2014	Succeeded by Paul Goldsmith
