= Catherine Wedd =

New Zealand politician

Catherine Wedd MP
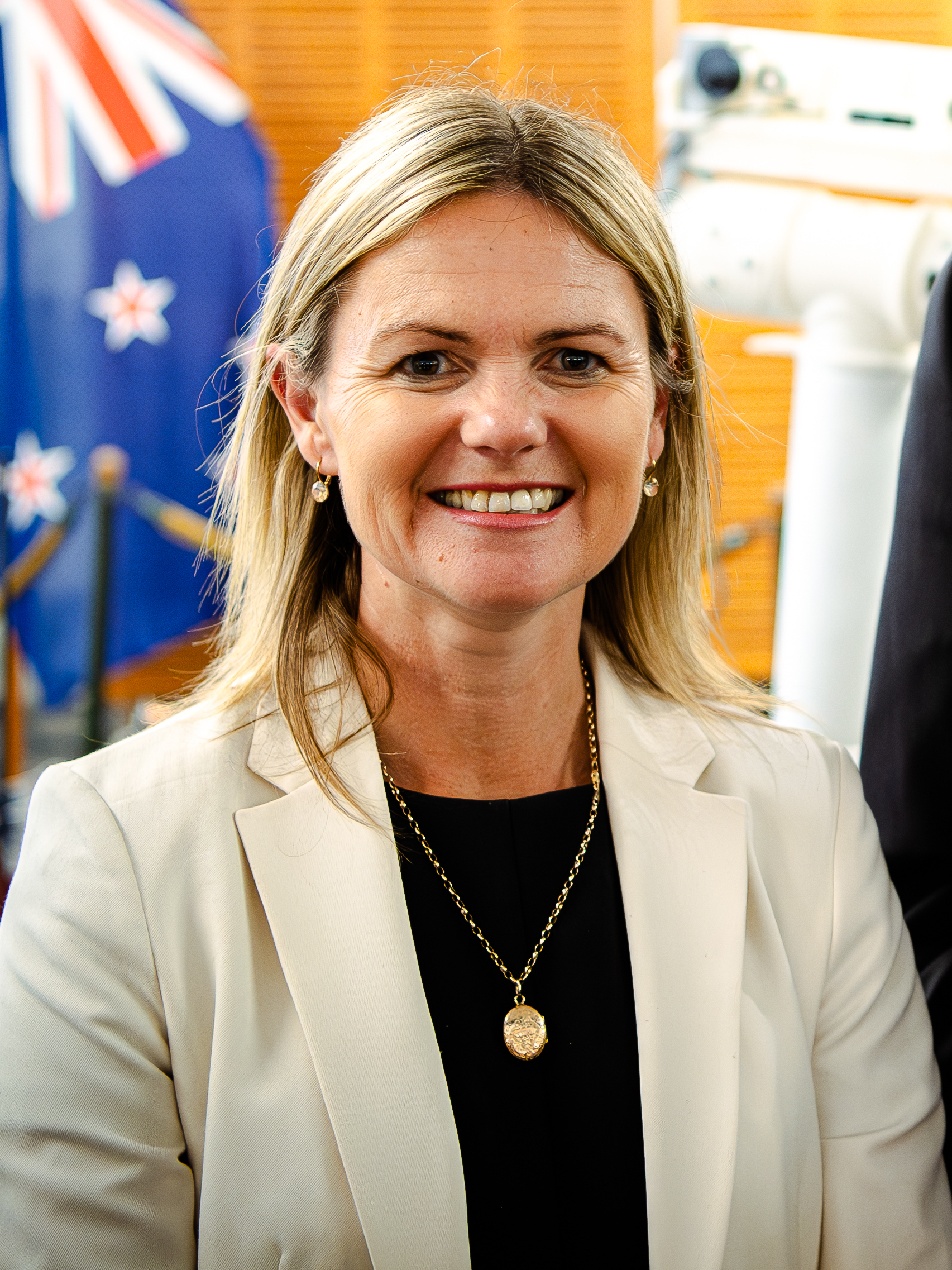
- Wedd in 2024

Member of the New Zealand Parliament for Tukituki
- Incumbent
- Assumed office 14 October 2023
- Preceded by: Anna Lorck

Personal details
- Born: Catherine Jane Loft; 1979 or 1980 (age 46–47)
- Party: National
- Relations: Bill Tolhurst (grandfather)
- Children: 4

Catherine Jane Wedd (née Loft; born 1979 or 1980) is a New Zealand politician and Member of Parliament for the National Party. Wedd currently serves as the chairperson of the Environment Select Committee. She is also Chair of the New Zealand Population and Development Committee which is a cross-party group focused on championing sexual and reproductive health and rights of women. She is a Parliamentary Private Secretary to Minister Mark Mitchell for Cyclone Recovery and was formerly the Deputy Chair of the Finance and Expenditure Committee and a member of the Primary Production Committee.

== Early life ==
Wedd was born and raised in Taumarunui. Here Wedd attended Ohura Area School, Tokirima School, Turaki Primary School and later Nga Tawa School in Marton.

=== Education ===
She completed a Bachelor of Law and Arts, majoring in Political Science and English and a post graduate diploma in Journalism at Canterbury University.

== Political career ==
New Zealand Parliament
Years	Term	Electorate	List	Party
2023–2026	54th	Tukituki	23	National
2026–present	55th	Tukituki	36	National

=== First term, 2023–2026 ===
On 21 January 2023, Wedd was announced as the National Party candidate for Tukituki in the 2023 New Zealand general election. She defeated the incumbent Anna Lorck, with whom she previously worked at Attn Marketing PR, with a margin of 10,118 votes. Lorck and Wedd were joint directors of that company.

During her campaign, Wedd criticized the government's response to Cyclone Gabrielle, saying perceived uncertainty about relief payments negatively impacted growers; she elsewhere supported the deregulation of the horticulture industry. Wedd has expressed support for a police crackdown on gang membership in the Hawke's Bay region, and has been critical of the education system.

On 17 December 2024, Wedd presented The Pae Ora (Healthy Futures) (3 Day Postnatal Stay) Amendment Bill, proposing at least 72 hours of postnatal inpatient care for new mothers – partly influenced by her own traumatic birth experience.

On 6 May 2025, Wedd introduced a private member's bill called the Social Media (Age-Restricted Users) Bill that would bar access to social media platforms for people under the age of 16 years. Since National's coalition partner ACT New Zealand had refused to support the bill, the Sixth National Government was forced to introduce it as a member's bill rather than a government bill. Prime Minister Christopher Luxon has confirmed that National would seek cross-party support for the legislation. Labour Party leader Chris Hipkins has expressed interest in supporting the bill, while New Zealand First leader Winston Peters said the bill should be subject to a select committee inquiry. Green Party co-leader Chlöe Swarbrick said she wanted to learn more about the bill but described it as simplistic.

=== Second term, 2026–present ===
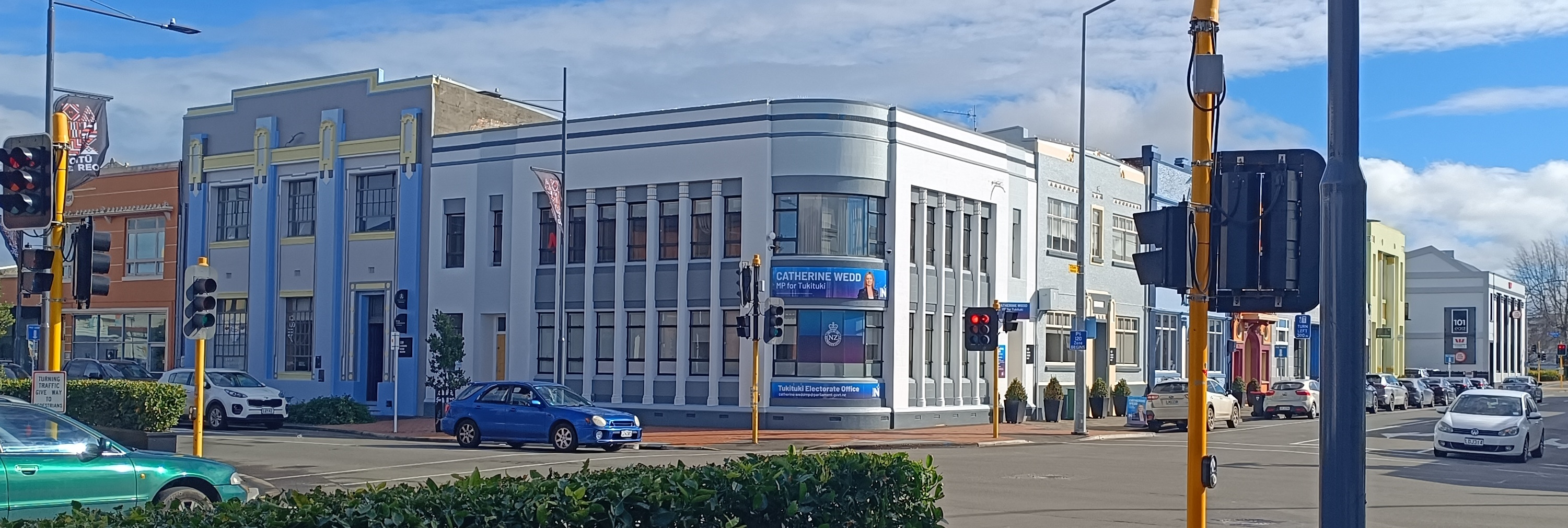
Wedd's electorate office in Hastings.

During the 2026 New Zealand general election, Wedd contested Tukituki for National. She was ranked 36th on the National Party list. Based on preliminary results, Wedd retained Tukituki by a landslide margin of 8,933 votes on 7 November.

== Personal life ==
Wedd and her husband Henry have four children. Wedd's grandfather was National Party MP Bill Tolhurst, who represented Whanganui from 1969 to 1972. Her grandmother Jeni Tolhurst also stood for selection.

New Zealand Parliament
Preceded by Anna Lorck	Member of Parliament for Tukituki; 2023–present	Incumbent
