= Ngāti Tūwharetoa–Ngāti Whitikaupeka War =

Maori conflict in New Zealand

Date	16th or 17th century?
Location	Mohaka and Ōamaru Rivers, New Zealand
Result	Ngāti Tūwharetoa victory: Ngāti Tūwharetoa gain the area between the Mohaka River and the Owhaoko Plateau

Belligerents
Ngāti Tūwharetoa Ngāti Kurapoto	Ngāti Whitikaupeka

Commanders and leaders
Ranginui-a-Haweri; Turi-roa; Whakarua	Pakira: Te Unahi; Po-te-heuea

The Ngāti Tūwharetoa–Ngāti Whitikaupeka War was a conflict which took place along the Mohaka and Ōamaru River valleys in the Kaweka and Kaimanawa Ranges of the central North Island of New Zealand. In revenge for the murder of Taniwha-pare-tuiri, Ngāti Tūwharetoa and Ngāti Kurapoto attacked Ngāti Whitikaupeka, a hapū of Ngāti Kahungunu. After the war the area between the Mohaka River and the Owhaoko Plateau became part of Ngāti Tūwharetoa's territory.

== Murder of Taniwha-pare-tuiri ==
Locations in the Ngāti Tūwharetoa–Ngāti Whitikaupeka War
1 Mohaka-Tapapa and Paengaroa
2 Tutae-puehu on the Taharua River
3 Rounui & Rouiti
4 Mount Te Ranga-a-Whakarua
5 Wai-a-Tapuritia
6 Owhaoko
7 Kuratau
8 Lake Rotoaira
9 Tauranga Taupō

Taniwha-pare-tuiri was the wife of Turi-roa of Ngāti Tūwharetoa, who lived at Mohaka-Tapapa on the Mohaka River. She went to dig fernroot at the nearby area of Poponui, drying it and placing it in kete (flax baskets) along with perei roots which she found while digging. These roots look a lot like kumara and when she passed by the Ngāti Whitikaupeka village of Paerangi, the local children told the adults that Taniwha-pare-tuiri was carrying kumara stolen from Paerangi, so a band of the men killed her and cooked her in an oven.

== Course of the war ==
When the people at Mohaka-Tapapa learnt of Taniwha-pare-tuiri's murder, they immediately gathered a war party, led by the leader of Ngāti Kurapoto, Ranginui-a-Haweri, who was her nephew (the son of her sister Pahau-moko), her husband Turi-roa, and Whakarua. They sent a message to the Ngāti Tūwharetoa and Ngāti Kurapoto at Taupō, who came down the Taharua River to join them. At Tutae-puehu, they encountered a woman of Ngāti Whitikaupeka called Hine-te-kikini whom they interrogated for information on the location of Ngāti Whitikaupeka. After she had told them what they wanted to know, they killed her and set up a block of pumice which was still known as Hine-te-kikini as of 1916.

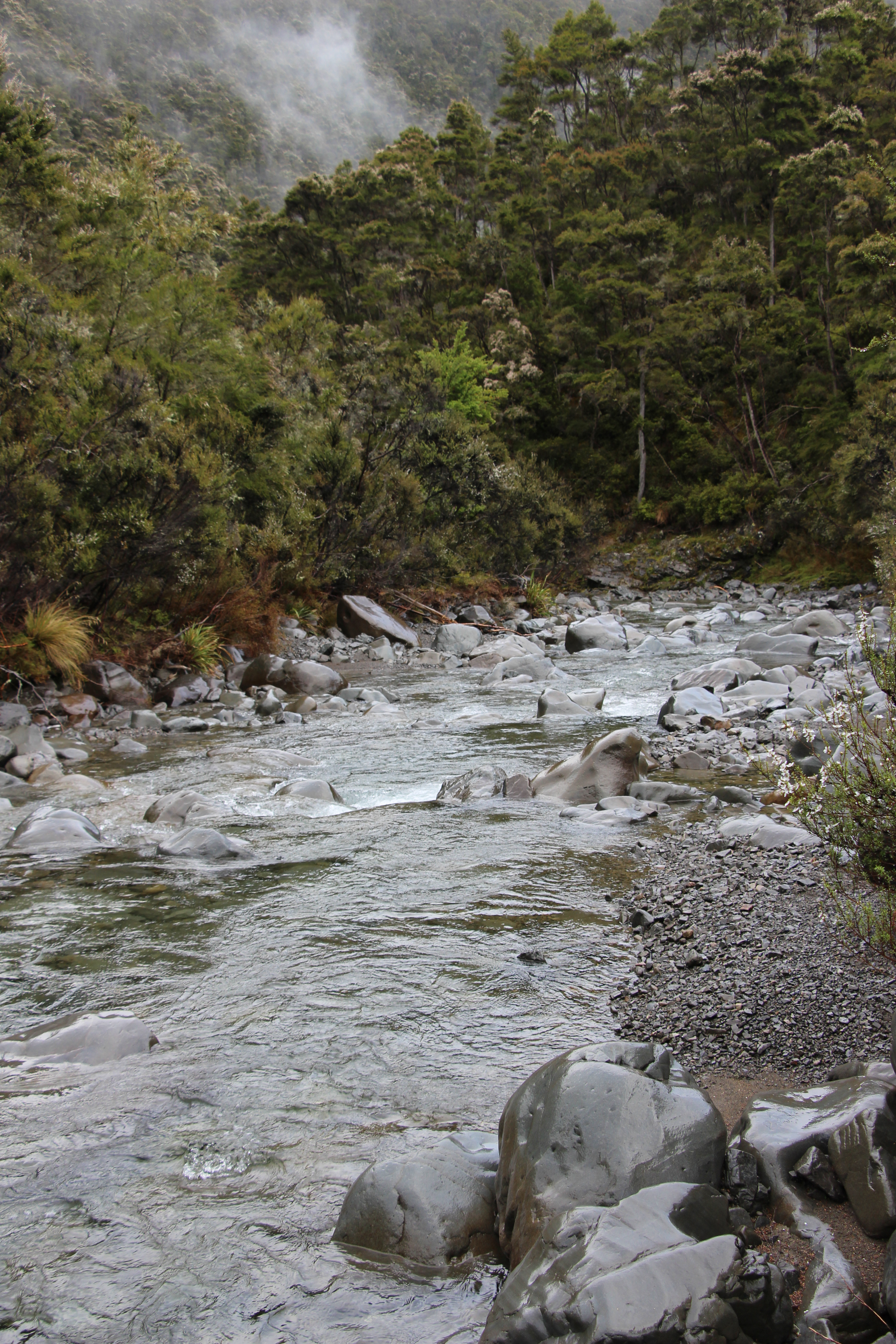
Upper reaches of the Ngaruroro River.

The war party took the fortresses of Rounui and Rouiti. Then they fought a battle, chasing Ngāti Whitikaupeka up the Ōamaru River, continuing up over Mount Te Ranga-a-Whakarua (named because it was first climbed on this occasion, by Whakarua), and along the Ngaruroro River, until they reached the Owhaoko plateau, where the Ngāti Whitikaupeka were defeated. The upper reaches of the Ngaruroro River are called Wai-a-Tapuritia, because Tapuritia was killed there.

As a result of this conflict, the whole area from the Mohaka River to the Owhaoko plateau was added to the domains of Ngāti Tūwharetoa. The war was successfully cited to establish their right to this land in the Maori Land Court in the late nineteenth century.

=== Subsequent conflicts ===
Further conflicts between Ngāti Tūwharetoa and Ngāti Whitikaupeka led Tū-te-tawhā to relocate his base from Lake Rotoaira (south of Lake Taupō) to the Karangahape cliffs at the south end of Lake Taupō, where he made his fortress on Motuwhara Island. Subsequently, he and his brother-in-law Tū-hereua went searching for a new location for a fortress. As the two of them came into Kuratau, unaware that it had been occupied by Ngāti Whitikaupeka, they were ambushed, but they successfully fought back, killing four rangatira: Kuratau, Te Rae, Mori, and Te Tatō, and putting the rest of Ngāti Whitikaupeka to flight. This is known as the battle of Uwhiuwhi-hiawai.

A generation later still, the Ngāti Whitikaupeka rangatira Tumakau-rangi joined Te Rehu in an attack on Tauranga Taupō, in which the Tūwharetoa rangatira Te Iwikinakia, son of Waikari was killed. In revenge, Ngāti Tūwharetoa attacked the Whitikaupeka fortress of Kirimara at Moawhango. They took the fortress and most of the defenders drowned as they tried to flee across the river. There were no further conflicts between the two iwi after this.

== Bibliography ==
- Downes, T. W. (1909). "Early History of Rangitikei, and Notes on the Ngati Apa Tribe". Transactions of the New Zealand Institute. 42: 74–114.
- Te Hata, Hoeta; Fletcher, H. J. (1916). "The Ngati-Tuhare-toa occupation of Taupo-nui-a-tia". Journal of the Polynesian Society. 25 (99): 104–116.
