= Hautapu River (Hawke's Bay Region) =

- Route of the Hautapu River
- Mouth of the Hautapu River Hautapu River (Hawke's Bay Region) (North Island)
- Native name: Hautapu (Māori)

Location
- Country: New Zealand
- Island: North Island
- Region: Hawke's Bay
- District: Taupō, Hastings, Wairoa

Physical characteristics
- Source
  - coordinates: 38.8504°S 176.59724°E
  - elevation: 1,330 m (4,360 ft)
- Mouth: Te Hoe River
  - coordinates: 38°58′44″S 176°48′04″E
  - elevation: 260 m (850 ft)
- Length: 38 km (24 mi)

Basin features
- Progression: Hautapu River → Te Hoe River → Mōhaka River → Hawke Bay → Pacific Ocean
- River system: Mōhaka River
- Tributaries
  - right: Pukahunui Stream

The Hautapu River is a river in the Hawkes Bay region of New Zealand. Its catchment is almost entirely forested.

== Geography ==
The Hautapu rises near the source of the Waìpunga River in pumice country, near the eastern edge of the Volcanic Plateau, where large Manoao flats have been converted into pine forest. It winds south-east through a steep, eroding greywacke gorge with podocarp forest. In the lower gorge several Hautapu tributaries drain unmodified beech and mixed podocarp forest. The river leaves the gorge at Ngatapa, once an important Ngāti Hineuru pā, and flows for over a kilometre through pasture and pine forest to join Te Hoe River.

The river is part of the system protected by the Water Conservation (Mohaka River) Order of 15 November 2004 for its high ecological, cultural, recreational and scenic significance.
