= Ōtorehinaiti River =

- Route of the Ōtorehinaiti River
- Mouth of the Ōtorehinaiti River Ōtorehinaiti River (North Island)
- Native name: Ōtorehinaiti (Māori)

Location
- Country: New Zealand
- Island: North Island
- Region: Hawke's Bay
- District: Hastings

Physical characteristics
- Source: Ōtorehinaiti Saddle
  - coordinates: 39.14198°S 176.21572°E
- Mouth: Mōhaka River
  - coordinates: 39°06′31″S 176°13′41″E
- Length: 13 km (8.1 mi)

Basin features
- Progression: Ōtorehinaiti River → Mōhaka River → Hawke Bay → Pacific Ocean
- River system: Mōhaka River

The Ōtorehinaiti River is a river of the northwestern Hawke's Bay Region of New Zealand's North Island. It flows northwest from the Kaweka Forest Park to reach the Ōamaru River.

== See also ==
- List of rivers of New Zealand
