= Taharua =

Rural locality in Hawke's Bay, New Zealand

- Rural community
- Interactive map of Taharua
- Coordinates: 38.922°S 176.271°E
- Country: New Zealand
- Region: Hawke's Bay Region
- Territorial authority: Taupō District
- Ward: Taupō East Rural General Ward
- Electorates: Taupō; Waiariki (Māori)

Government
  - Territorial Authority: Taupō District Council
  - Regional council: Hawke's Bay Regional Council
  - Mayor of Taupō: John Funnell
  - Taupō MP: Louise Upston
  - Waiariki MP: Rawiri Waititi
- Postcode(s): 3379

Taharua is a rural community in the Taupō District and Hawke's Bay Region of New Zealand's North Island, located around the Ōamaru and Taharua Rivers, which are tributaries of the Mohaka River.

== Demographics ==
Taharua statistical area covers 784.24 km^{2} (302.80 sq mi) and had an estimated population of 90 as of June 2025, with a population density of 0.11 people per km^{2}.

Historical population
Year	Pop.	±% p.a.
2006	81	—
2013	57	−4.90%
2018	57	+0.00%
2023	81	+7.28%

Taharua had a population of 81 in the 2023 New Zealand census, an increase of 24 people (42.1%) since the 2018 census, and an increase of 24 people (42.1%) since the 2013 census. There were 42 males and 42 females in 36 dwellings. The median age was 31.7 years (compared with 38.1 years nationally). There were 15 people (18.5%) aged under 15 years, 21 (25.9%) aged 15 to 29, 39 (48.1%) aged 30 to 64, and 3 (3.7%) aged 65 or older.

People could identify as more than one ethnicity. The results were 51.9% European (Pākehā), 37.0% Māori, 3.7% Pasifika, 25.9% Asian, and 7.4% other, which includes people giving their ethnicity as "New Zealander". English was spoken by 96.3%, Māori by 3.7%, and other languages by 22.2%. No language could be spoken by 3.7% (e.g. too young to talk). New Zealand Sign Language was known by 3.7%. The percentage of people born overseas was 22.2, compared with 28.8% nationally.

Religious affiliations were 40.7% Christian, 3.7% Māori religious beliefs, and 7.4% other religions. People who answered that they had no religion were 51.9%, and 3.7% of people did not answer the census question.

Of those at least 15 years old, 3 (4.5%) people had a bachelor's or higher degree, 39 (59.1%) had a post-high school certificate or diploma, and 27 (40.9%) people exclusively held high school qualifications. The median income was $54,700, compared with $41,500 nationally. 6 people (9.1%) earned over $100,000 compared to 12.1% nationally. The employment status of those at least 15 was 45 (68.2%) full-time, 6 (9.1%) part-time, and 3 (4.5%) unemployed.
