= Kaipo River (Hawke's Bay) =

- Route of the Kaipo River
- Mouth of the Kaipo River Kaipo River (Hawke's Bay) (North Island)
- Native name: Kaipo (Māori)

Location
- Country: New Zealand
- Island: North Island
- Region: Hawke's Bay
- District: Taupō

Physical characteristics
- Source: Kaipo Saddle
  - location: Whirinaki Te Pua-a-Tāne Conservation Park
  - coordinates: 39.04625°S 176.14037°E
- Mouth: Mōhaka River
  - coordinates: 39°04′22″S 176°16′12″E

Basin features
- Progression: Kaipo River → Mōhaka River → Hawke Bay → Pacific Ocean
- River system: Mōhaka River
- Tributaries
  - left: Tiki Tiki Stream
  - right: Rouiti Stream

The Kaipo River, also known as the Kaipō River, is a river in the Taupō District and Hawke's Bay region of New Zealand's North Island. It flows east from its origins near the Kaipo Saddle in the Kaimanawa Forest Park, before flowing south, merging with the Ōamaru River to form the Mōhaka River.

== Geography ==
The Kaipo Valley to Cascade Stream Track follows the entire length of the river. A Department of Conservation hut, the Oamaru Hut, is located at the mouth of the Kaipo River.

== See also ==
- List of rivers of New Zealand
