= Makahu River =

- Route of the Makahu River
- Mouth of the Makahu River Makahu River (North Island)
- Native name: Makahu (Māori)

Location
- Country: New Zealand
- Island: North Island
- Region: Hawke's Bay
- District: Hastings

Physical characteristics
- Source: Kaweka Range
  - coordinates: 39.2773°S 176.38584°E
- Mouth: Mōhaka River
  - coordinates: 39°12′04″S 176°29′48″E
- Length: 15 km (9.3 mi)

Basin features
- Progression: Mākino River → Mōhaka River → Hawke Bay → Pacific Ocean
- River system: Mōhaka River
- Tributaries
  - right: Pinnacle Stream, Anawhenua Stream

The Makahu River is a river of New Zealand's North Island. It flows generally north from its origins in the Kaweka Range, reaching the Mohaka River in rough hill country southeast of Lake Taupō. About half of the river's length is within Kaweka Forest Park.

== See also ==
- List of rivers of New Zealand
