= Mangatainoka River (Hawke's Bay) =

- Route of the Mangatainoka River
- Mouth of the Mangatainoka River Mangatainoka River (Hawke's Bay) (North Island)
- Native name: Mangatainoka (Māori)

Location
- Country: New Zealand
- Island: North Island
- Region: Hawke's Bay
- District: Taupō District, Hastings

Physical characteristics
- Source
  - coordinates: 39.17519°S 176.26259°E
- Mouth: Mōhaka River
  - coordinates: 39°09′44″S 176°23′41″E

Basin features
- Progression: Mangatainoka River → Mōhaka River → Hawke Bay → Pacific Ocean
- River system: Mōhaka River

The Mangatainoka River is a river of the centre of New Zealand's North Island. A tributary of the Mōhaka River, it flows generally east from its source in the Kaweka Forest Park.

== Geography ==
The mouth of the Mangatainoka River is located at the border between the Hastings District and a section of the Taupō District found in the Hawke's Bay Region.

== History ==
In 1966, the Mangatainoka Hut, a Department of Conservation hut, was constructed near the banks of the river.

== See also ==
- List of rivers of New Zealand
