= Kaipo River =

Kaipo River may refer to two rivers in New Zealand:

- Kaipo River (Hawke's Bay), a tributary of the Mōhaka River
- Kaipo River (Fiordland), a river in northern Fiordland
