= Te Hoe River =

- Route of the Te Hoe River
- Mouth of the Te Hoe River Te Hoe River (North Island)
- Native name: Te Hoe (Māori)

Location
- Country: New Zealand
- Island: North Island
- Region: Hawke's Bay
- District: Wairoa

Physical characteristics
- Source
  - location: Whirinaki Te Pua-a-Tāne Conservation Park
  - coordinates: 38.81182°S 176.75071°E
- Mouth: Mōhaka River
  - coordinates: 39°01′21″S 176°49′13″E
- Length: 23 km (14 mi)

Basin features
- Progression: Te Hoe River → Mōhaka River → Hawke Bay → Pacific Ocean
- River system: Mōhaka River
- Tributaries
  - left: Mangahouanga Stream, Whakamarino Stream
  - right: Hautapu River

The Te Hoe River is a river of the Hawke's Bay region of New Zealand's North Island. It flows south from its sources west of Lake Waikaremoana to reach the Mohaka River 20 kilometres north of Lake Tutira.

The river and its tributary streams, including Mangahouanga, flow through the Tahora Formation, and is a location where many Mesozoic fossils have been uncovered since the 1970s. In 1999, palaeontologist Joan Wiffen discovered the vertebra bone of a titanosaur in a tributary of the Te Hoe River.

== See also ==
- List of rivers of New Zealand
