= Mokomokonui River =

River in New Zealand

- Route of the Mokomokonui River
- Mouth of the Mokomokonui River Mokomokonui River (North Island)
- Native name: Mokomokonui (Māori)

Location
- Country: New Zealand
- Island: North Island
- Region: Hawke's Bay
- District: Hastings

Physical characteristics
- Source
  - coordinates: 38.98176°S 176.69621°E
- Mouth: Waipunga River
  - coordinates: 39°02′55″S 176°35′18″E
- Length: 16 km (9.9 mi)

Basin features
- Progression: Mokomokonui River → Waipunga River → Mōhaka River → Hawke Bay → Pacific Ocean
- River system: Mōhaka River
- Tributaries
  - right: Mokomokomā Stream, Paewai Stream, Moose Stream, Matakuhia Stream

The Mokomokonui River, also known as the Mokomokonui Stream, is a river of the Hawke's Bay Region of New Zealand's North Island. It flows generally southwest from its sources in several streams southwest of Lake Waikaremoana, and flows into the Waipunga River close to the settlement of Tarawera and State Highway 5.

== Geography ==
The Mokomokonui River is a tributary of the Waipunga River. The Mokomokonui River adds enough water into the Waipunga River that the river becomes navigable by waka south of this point.

The Mokomokonui River meets the Waipunga River at the location of two reserves: the Waipunga Recreation Area and the Tarawera South Conservation Area.

== See also ==
- List of rivers of New Zealand
