= Mangatainoka River =

Mangatainoka River may refer to two rivers in New Zealand:

- Mangatainoka River (Hawke's Bay), a tributary of the Mōhaka River
- Mangatainoka River (Tararua District), a river flowing between the Tararua Range and Eketāhuna
