= Mākino River =

- Route of the Mākino River
- Mouth of the Mākino River Mākino River (North Island)
- Native name: Mākino (Māori)

Location
- Country: New Zealand
- Island: North Island
- Region: Hawke's Bay
- District: Hastings

Physical characteristics
- Source: Kaweka Range
  - coordinates: 39.24568°S 176.3249°E
- Mouth: Mōhaka River
  - coordinates: 39°10′23″S 176°24′24″E
- Length: 15 km (9.3 mi)

Basin features
- Progression: Mākino River → Mōhaka River → Hawke Bay → Pacific Ocean
- River system: Mōhaka River
- Tributaries
  - left: Mangaturutu Stream, Waimatai Stream
- Bridges: Makino–Mangaturutu three-wire bridge

The Mākino River is a river of the east of New Zealand's North Island. It flows northeast from the Kaweka Range as one of the headwaters of the Mohaka River. The Mākino's entire length is within Kaweka Forest Park.

== Geography ==
A Department of Conservation trail connects the Mangaturutu Hut and Makino Hut in the Kaweka Forest Park, which includes a three-wire bridge that crosses the Mākino River.

== See also ==
- List of rivers of New Zealand
