= Ripia River =

River in New Zealand

- Route of the Ripia River
- Mouth of the Ripia River Ripia River (North Island)
- Native name: Ripia (Māori)

Location
- Country: New Zealand
- Island: North Island
- Region: Hawke's Bay
- District: Taupō, Hastings

Physical characteristics
- Source: Ahimanawa Range
  - coordinates: 38.95777°S 176.33649°E
- Mouth: Mōhaka River
  - coordinates: 39°12′03″S 176°30′59″E
- Length: 33 km (21 mi)

Basin features
- Progression: Ripia River → Mōhaka River → Hawke Bay → Pacific Ocean
- River system: Mōhaka River
- Tributaries
  - left: Tunamaro Stream, Panemanga Stream, Papangahui Stream, Mangakiokio Stream, Rerepari Stream, Whakahu Stream, Awahōhonu Stream, Ōtumu Stream
  - right: Pawhare Creek, Awakari Stream, Waiari Stream, Makiekie Stream

The Ripia River is a river of the Hawke's Bay Region of New Zealand's North Island. A major tributary of the Mōhaka River, it flows generally southeast from its sources at the northern end of the Ahimanawa Range 25 km (16 mi) east of Lake Taupō, reaching the Mohaka 40 km (25 mi) northwest of Napier.

== Geography ==
The Ripia River is a tributary of the Mōhaka River.

== Biodiversity ==
The river is an important spawning location for introduced brown trout, as it does not frequently flood as much as the Mōhaka River. Due to this, the river is a location used for recreational trout fishing.

== History ==
The river is culturally significant to iwi of the northwestern Hawke's Bay Region, including Ngāti Hineuru. While not traditionally a focus of settlement, the river was an important resource, where New Zealand eels (Anguilla dieffenbachii and A. australis) kōura (freshwater crayfish), and hāngī stones were collected. The dens forested margins of the river were also an important source for traditional resources including birds, harakeke flax and medicinal plants.

== See also ==
- List of rivers of New Zealand
