= Waipunga River =

River in New Zealand

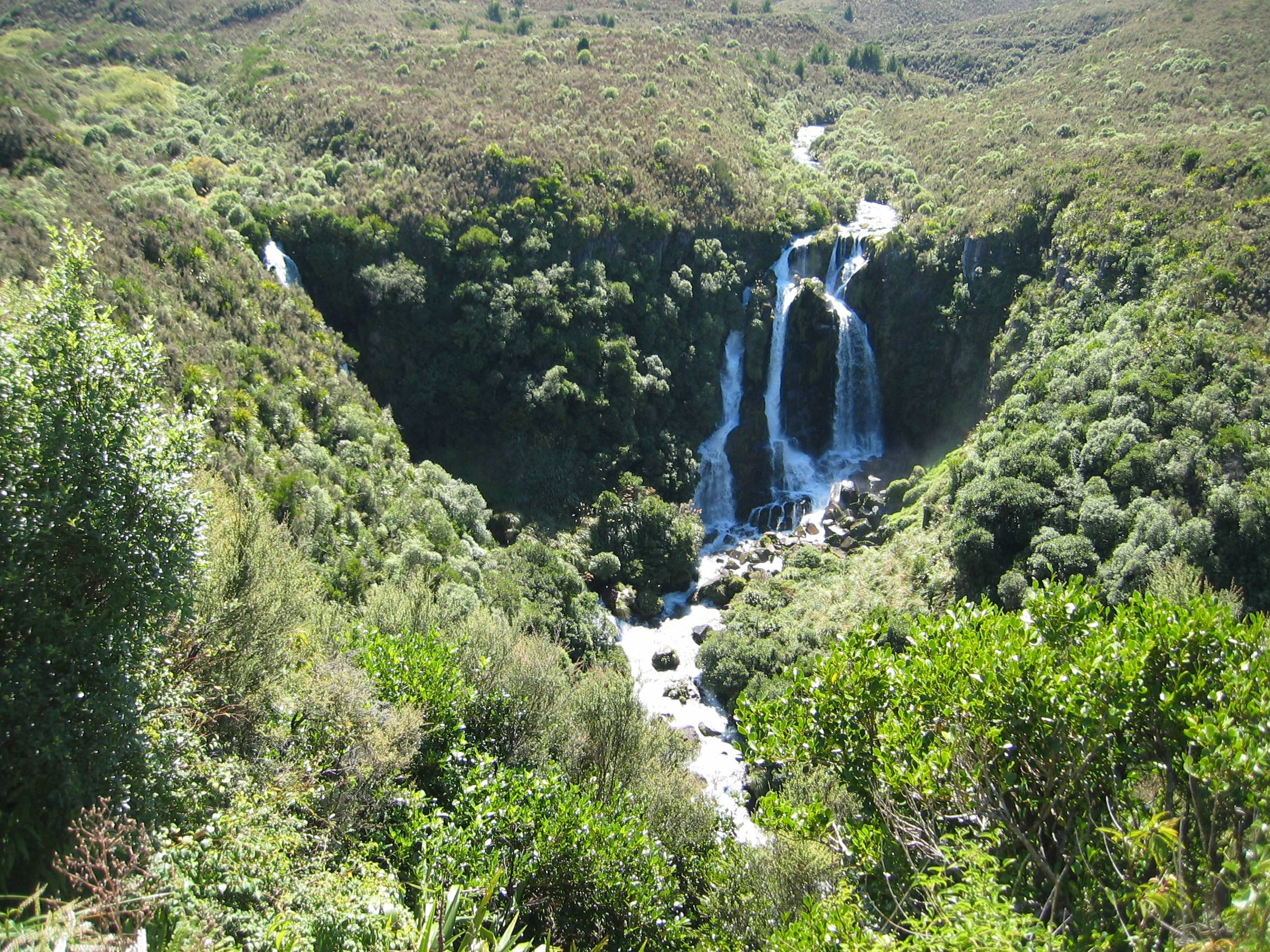
- Waipunga Falls
- Route of the Waipunga River
- Mouth of the Waipunga River Waipunga River (North Island)
- Native name: Waipunga (Māori)

Location
- Country: New Zealand
- Island: North Island
- Region: Hawke's Bay
- District: Taupō, Hastings Taupo

Physical characteristics
- Source: Confluence of the Kokomoka Stream and Harakeatanemate Stream
  - coordinates: 38.83677°S 176.53141°E
- Mouth: Mōhaka River
  - coordinates: 39°06′16″S 176°41′15″E
- Length: 50 km (31 mi)

Basin features
- Progression: Waipunga River → Mōhaka River → Hawke Bay → Pacific Ocean
- River system: Mōhaka River
- Tributaries
  - left: Okoeke Stream, Aniwaniwa Stream, Waione Stream, Otawhiri Stream, Mokomokonui River, Ōteākau Stream, Mangakahikatoa Stream, Mangawhio Stream
  - right: Ngapaaka Stream, Waiarua Stream, Kopitonui Stream, Takaroro Stream, Ōhane Stream, Waimakuku Stream, Waione Stream, Waikinakitangata Stream
- Waterfalls: Waipunga Falls, Hukawai Falls
- Bridges: Ohinekuku Bridge, Ruawhiti Bridge, Ruatiti Bridge

The Waipunga River is a river of the Hawke's Bay Region of New Zealand's North Island. A tributary of the Mōhaka River located between Taupō and Napier in New Zealand's North Island, it runs roughly 50 km (31 mi) from its source near the eastern edge of the Volcanic Plateau to its junction with the Mōhaka, of which some 15 km (9.3 mi) follow alongside the Napier-Taupō highway (State Highway 5).

== Geography ==
The Waipunga Falls and Hukawai Falls are both part of the Waipunga River. Both features can be found along State Highway 5. Fault lines can be found along the course of the river, leading to the presence of hot springs, such as the Tarawera Hot Springs.

== History ==
The river is culturally significant to iwi of the northwestern Hawke's Bay Region, including Ngāti Hineuru. The river is a traditional rohe marker, and has many traditional kāinga (villages), fortified pā and food collecting areas. Ngāti Hineuru have permanently settled the area near Tarawera since the times of the iwi's eponymous ancestress, Hineuru.

The name Waipunga literally means "Anchor River", and refers to how the river was a traditional anchorage. The Waipunga River is navigable by waka or canoe as far north as the point where the Mokomokonui River flows into the river.

The river is a traditional source for fish, koura (crayfish), drinking water and hāngī stones, while the surrounding forest provided birds, medicinal plants. The waters of the river are traditionally associated with spiritual cleansing for Ngāti Hineuru, used in birthing rituals, funerary cleansing, and as part of tā moko tattoing processes. The Tarawera Hot Springs have traditionally been used for bathing, cooking and rongoā medicinal practices.

== See also ==
- List of rivers of New Zealand
