= Tahora Formation =

Late Cretaceous geological formation in New Zealand

- Stratigraphic range: Santonian-Maastrichtian (Piripauan); ~85.8–66 Ma
- Type: Geological formation
- Unit of: Tinui Group
- Sub-units: Maungataniwha Sandstone Member, Mutuera Member, Houpapa Member
- Underlies: Whangai Formation
- Overlies: Urewera Group or Matawai Group
- Thickness: ~500 m (1,600 ft)

Lithology
- Primary: Sandstone, conglomerate
- Other: Siltstone

Location
- Coordinates: 39.0°S 176.8°E
- Approximate paleocoordinates: 59.4°S 168.8°W
- Region: North Island
- Country: New Zealand
- Extent: Gisborne

Type section
- Named for: Tahora Station
- Tahora Formation (New Zealand)

The Tahora Formation is a Late Cretaceous geologic formation that outcrops in northeastern New Zealand near Napier. It is Haumurian in age according to the New Zealand geologic time scale (mainly Campanian, but ranging from Santonian to lower Maastrichtian). It forms part of the Upper Cretaceous to Teurian (Danian) (lower Paleocene) Tinui Group. It unconformably overlies the Jurassic to Lower Cretaceous Urewera Group or the Upper Cretaceous Matawai Group. It is conformably overlain by the Haumurian to Teurian Whangai Formation. It consist of three members, the Maungataniwha Sandstone Member, the Mutuera Member and the Houpapa Member. It is named for Tahora Station, south of Matawai in the Gisborne Region. The aptly named Maungataniwha (Māori for "mountain of monsters") Sandstone Member is known for its rich reptile fossil remains, first investigated by amateur palaeontologist Joan Wiffen.

== Depositional environment ==
The whole of the Tinui Group is interpreted to be an upper Cretaceous transgressive sequence. The Maungataniwha Sandstone Member was deposited in a very shallow water to beach environment. The siltstones of the time-equivalent Mutuera Member are thought to have been deposited in a mid to outer shelf environment. The Houpapa Member is interpreted to be the fill of local channels cut into the underlying strata.

== Fossil content ==
=== Vertebrates ===
Indeterminate dinosaur remains have been recovered from the formation, including indeterminate theropod, sauropod, and ornithischian remains. Other fossils found in the Tahora Formation include plesiosaurs and pterosaurs.

Because of a lack of material, the exact taxonomic placement of the theropod from the Tahora Formation is uncertain, although its discoverer Joan Wiffen considered it possibly a megalosaurid, at the time a poorly defined group of unspecialized large carnivorous dinosaurs. The vertebra was described by Molnar (1981), and was considered an indeterminate theropod by Agnolin et al. (2010).

==== Reptiles ====
===== Plesiosaurs =====
Plesiosaurs recorded from Tahora Formation
Genus	Species	Member/Location	Material	Description	Image
Tuarangisaurus	T. keyesi	Maungataniwha Sandstone	A nearly complete skull, mandible, rear skull elements, and nine anterior-most cervical vertebrae from the same individual.	An elasmosaurid	

===== Mosasaurs =====
Mosasaurs recorded from Tahora Formation
Genus	Species	Member/Location	Material	Description	Image
Moanasaurus	M. mangahouangae	Maungataniwha Sandstone	A disarticulated skull, vertebrae, ribs and flipper bones.	A mosasaurin mosasaur	

===== Pterosaurs =====
Pterosaurs recorded from Tahora Formation
Genus	Species	Member/Location	Material	Description	Image
Azhdarchidae indet.	Indeterminate	Maungataniwha Member, Mangahouanga Stream	Distal left ulna, coracoid fragment		

===== Dinosaurs =====
Dinosaurs recorded from Tahora Formation
Genus	Species	Member/Location	Material	Description	Image
Ankylosauria indet.	Indeterminate	Maungataniwha Member, Mangahouanga Stream	An incomplete rib and two caudal veterbral centra		
Ornithopoda indet.	Indeterminate	Maungataniwha Member, Mangahouanga Stream	Partial right ilium		
Sauropoda indet.	Indeterminate	Maungataniwha Member	A rib fragment		
Theropoda indet.	Indeterminate	Maungataniwha Member, Mangahouanga Stream	Caudal vertebra, pedal phalanx		

=== Invertebrates ===
Invertebrates found in the formation include beetles, ammonites, annelids, belemnites, bivalves, brachiopods, crinoids, crustaceans, gastropods, nautiloids and scaphopods.

== See also ==
- List of dinosaur-bearing rock formations
  - List of stratigraphic units with indeterminate dinosaur fossils
- Geology of the Raukumara region
- Stratigraphy of New Zealand
- South Polar region of the Cretaceous
