= Mohaka Viaduct =

Mohaka viaduct
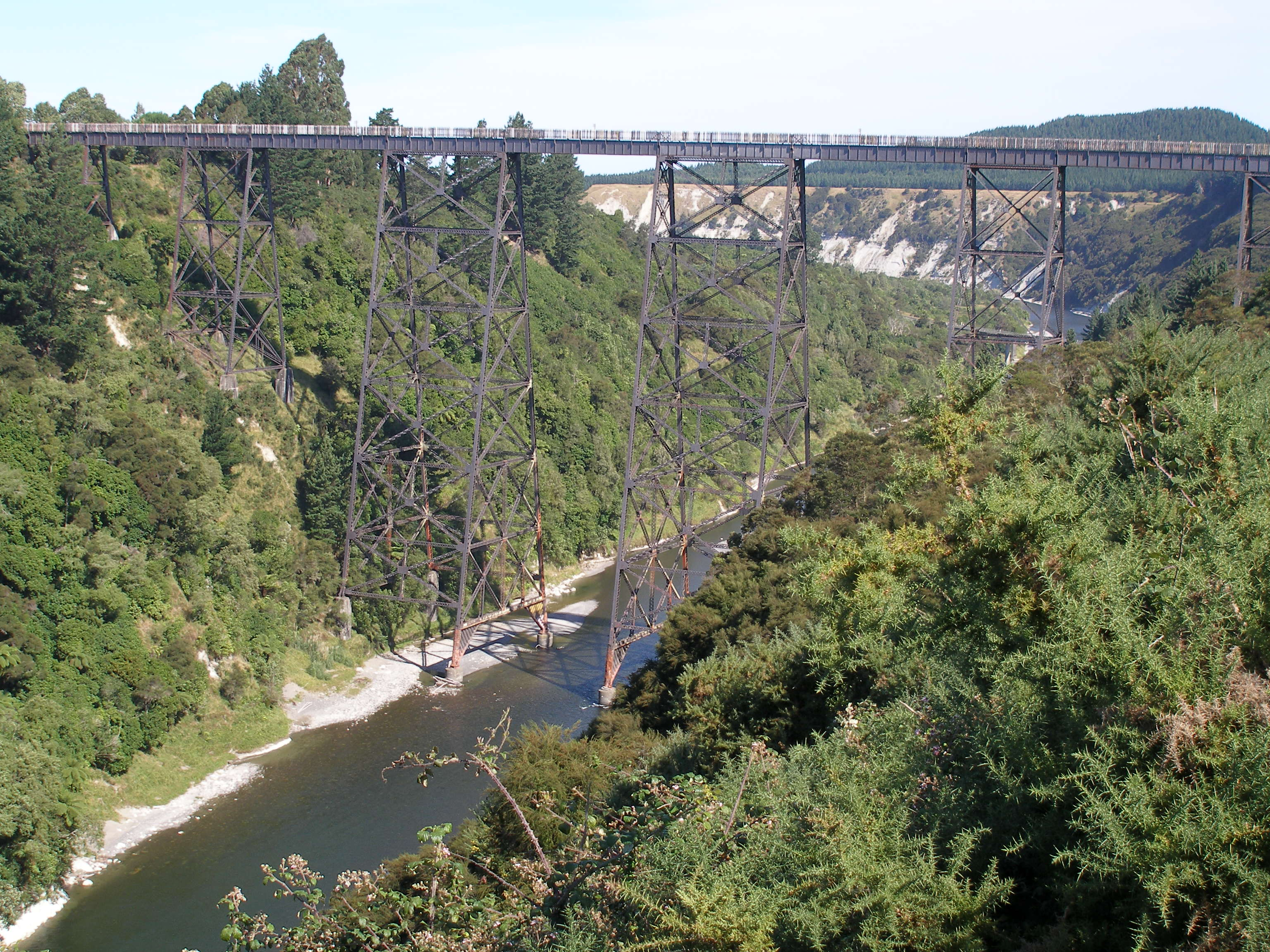
- The Mohaka viaduct crossing the Mohaka River in Northern Hawke's Bay, New Zealand
- Coordinates: 39.0686°S 177.1257°E
- Carries: Single track of the Palmerston North–Gisborne Line
- Crosses: Mohaka River
- Locale: Raupunga, Northern Hawke’s Bay, North Island, New Zealand
- Owner: KiwiRail

Characteristics
- Design: Plate girder
- Material: Mild steel
- Total length: 276.8 metres (908 ft)
- Height: 95 metres (312 ft)
- No. of spans: 12

History
- Designer: John L. Cull and W. L. Newnham
- Engineering design by: Components prefabricated by PWD workshops, Mt Maunganui, Bay of Plenty
- Constructed by: The Public Works Department (PWD) for the New Zealand Railways Department (NZR).
- Construction start: 1930
- Construction end: June 1937
- Opened: 1 July 1937

Location
- Interactive map of Mohaka viaduct

The Mohaka Viaduct is a railway viaduct spanning the Mohaka River in northern Hawke’s Bay, on the East Coast of the North Island of New Zealand, near the small settlement of Raupunga. It was built between 1930 and 1937 by the Public Works Department (PWD) for the New Zealand Railways Department (NZR). It is 276.8 metres (908 ft) in length, and at 95 metres (312 ft), is the tallest viaduct in Australasia.

== Background ==
Construction of the railway line from Palmerston North to Gisborne line began in 1872, connecting Palmerston North with Napier in 1891. The northern portion from Napier to Wairoa, and then to Gisborne followed much later, being built between 1912 and 1942.

The section of line between Napier and Wairoa passed through difficult country, requiring heavy earthworks, five tunnels, five high steel viaducts to cross deep gorges, and numerous other bridges. Progress was slow, with portions of the line being progressively opened as sections were completed and handed over to the Railways Department.

After completion of the line from Wairoa to the viaduct site in late 1930, the pre-fabricated steel work was railed from the small port of Waikokopu, about 40 km east of Wairoa. A start was made with the driving of test piles, and the digging of 18.3 metres (60 ft) to 21.3 metres (70 ft) deep foundations in the river bed, enabled by the use of pressurised caissons.

The Government of the day faced major financial problems following the 1929 stock market crash in the US, and the onset of what would become the Great Depression of the 1930s. To cut costs work was suspended on most of the line, although foundation work continued at the Mohaka viaduct.

Then on 3 February 1931 the Hawke’s Bay earthquake caused an enormous amount of damage to both the line and the associated works. Combined with ongoing financial difficulties, this caused the eventual abandonment of work all along the line, although the Mohaka viaduct foundations were finished before work stopped.

The works lay idle until restarted in 1936, after a change in Government and some degree of recovery from the Depression. Preparatory work on completing the viaduct started in June 1936, and the completed viaduct was formally opened by the Minister of Public Works Bob Semple on 1 July 1937; it was nick-named "Bob Semple's Meccano set". It was built without accidents and ahead of schedule. When catastrophic floods in April 1938 washed away part of the low-level road bridge the viaduct was pressed into temporary service for road traffic, before regular trains were using it.

== Design and construction ==
The viaduct was designed by John Ernest Lelliot Cull (known as JEL Cull) and William Langston Newnham, both of whom worked in the PWD head office. It is built of mild steel components, which were prefabricated at the Public Works Department Workshops at Mount Maunganui, near Tauranga, shipped to Waikokopu, and railed to the construction site.

The steelwork was erected using a cable-way across the gorge to place the material, with the actual erection taking seven months. All told the viaduct incorporates 1,824.7 tonnes (1,795.9 long tons; 2,011.4 short tons) of steel, held together by about 450,000 rivets.

On completion the Mohaka viaduct was the fourth highest in the world at 95 metres (312 ft), and remains the highest viaduct in Australasia. There are twelve plate girder through spans – four spans of 15.2 metres (50 ft), one of 19.8 metres (65 ft), three of 24.7 metres (81 ft), and four of 30.5 metres (100 ft) – supported on six trestle piers.

== Current status ==
This item of New Zealand's engineering heritage was recognised as part of the Institution of Professional Engineers New Zealand (IPENZ) "Engineering to 1990" project which the institution organised to help celebrate New Zealand's 150th anniversary in 1990. A plaque was unveiled to mark the significance of this railway viaduct as part of the development of the nation.

The viaduct has been registered by the New Zealand Historic Places Trust as a Category 1 historic place (Register no.4418).

Following severe storm damage between Wairoa and Gisborne, and doubts about financial viability of the line, the northern portion of the line from Napier – Gisborne was reviewed as part of KiwiRail's turn-around plan, and was effectively mothballed north of Wairoa in early 2012. Later, on 2 October 2012 KiwiRail announced the mothballing of the entire line from Napier to Gisborne. Trains began running again in 2019.

== Images ==
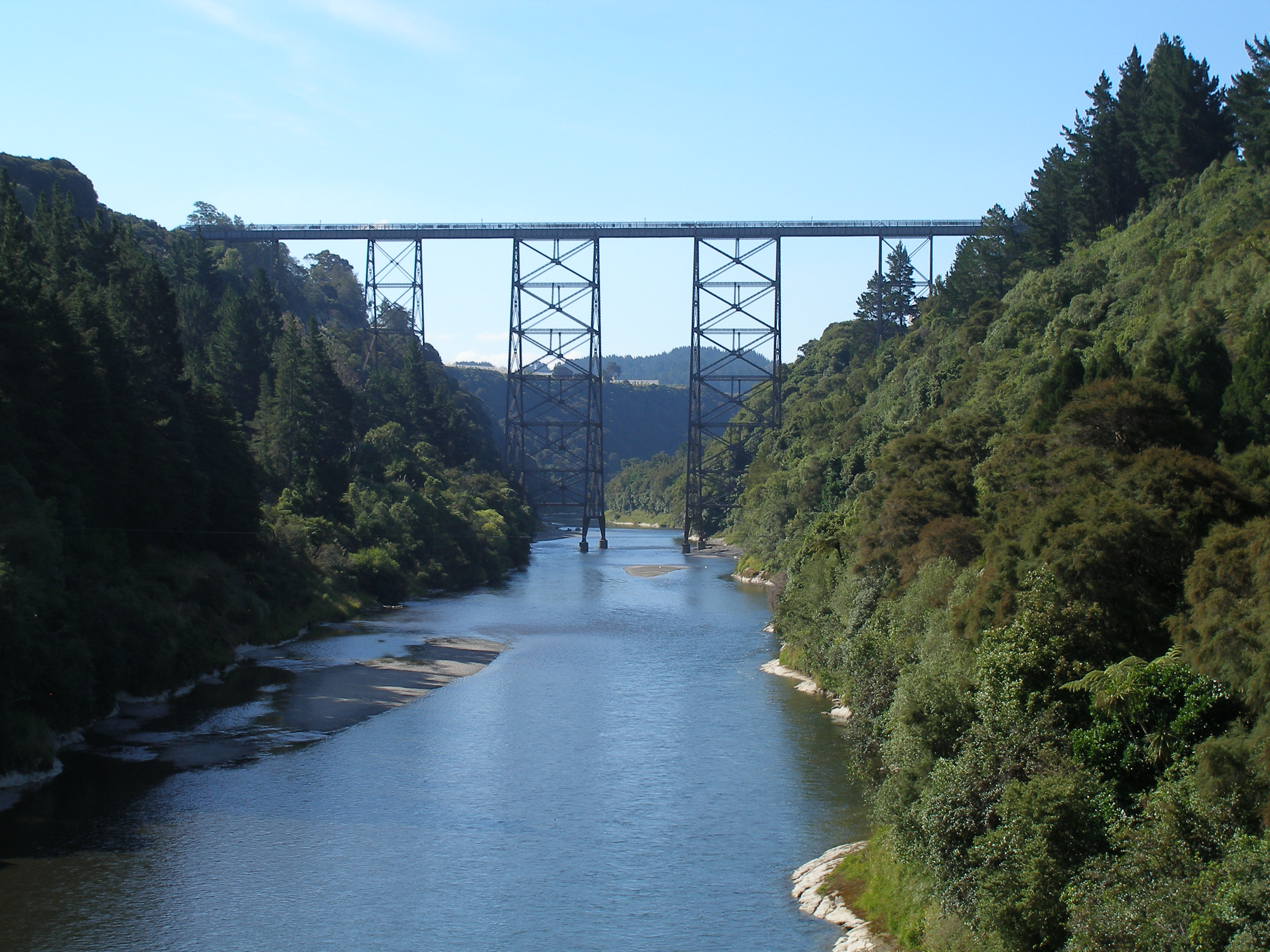
This view looks northwest from the Mohaka River road bridge.

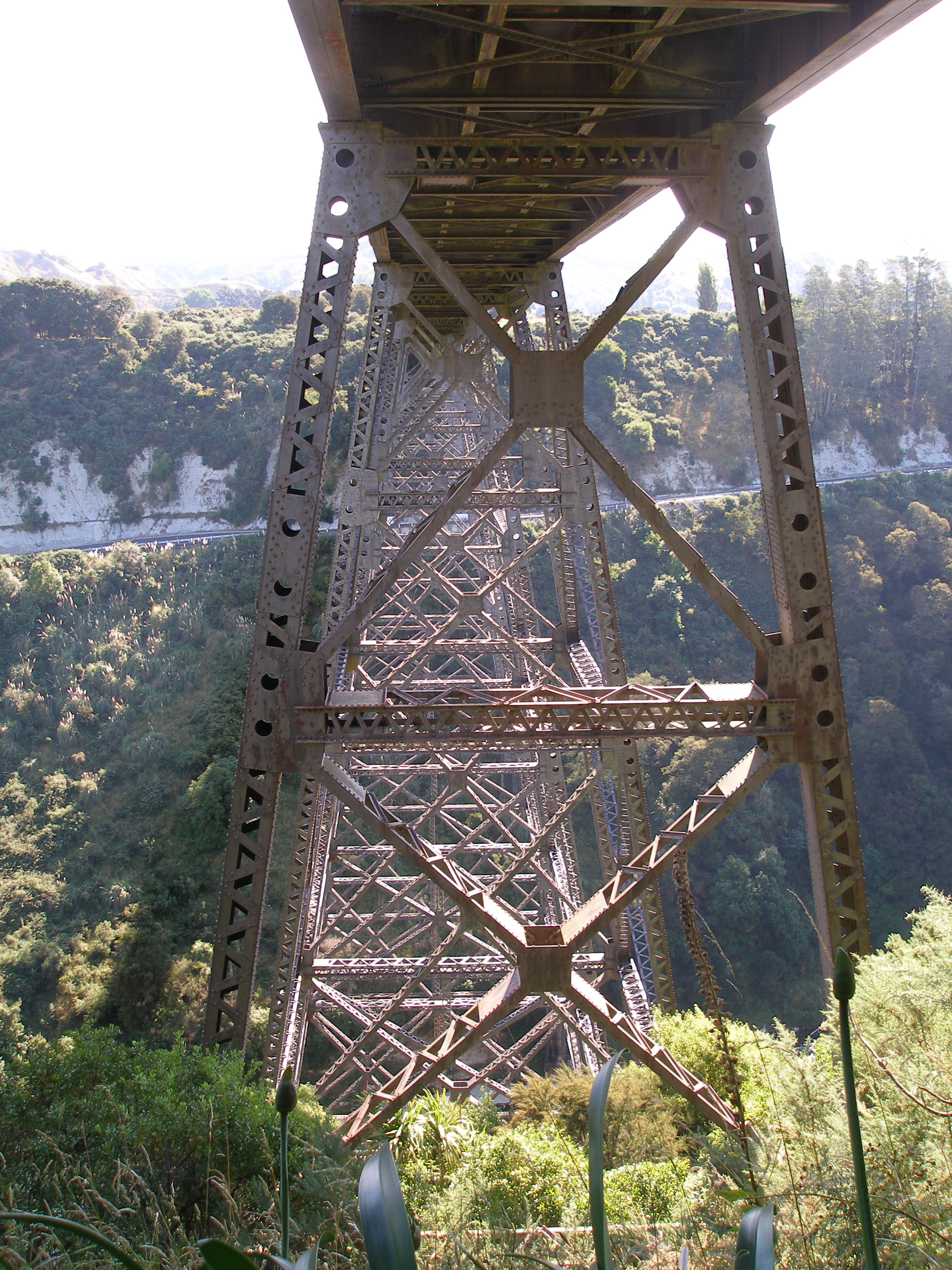
The piers that support the plate girder bridge, seen from under the eastern abutment. State Highway 2 traverses the opposite bank.

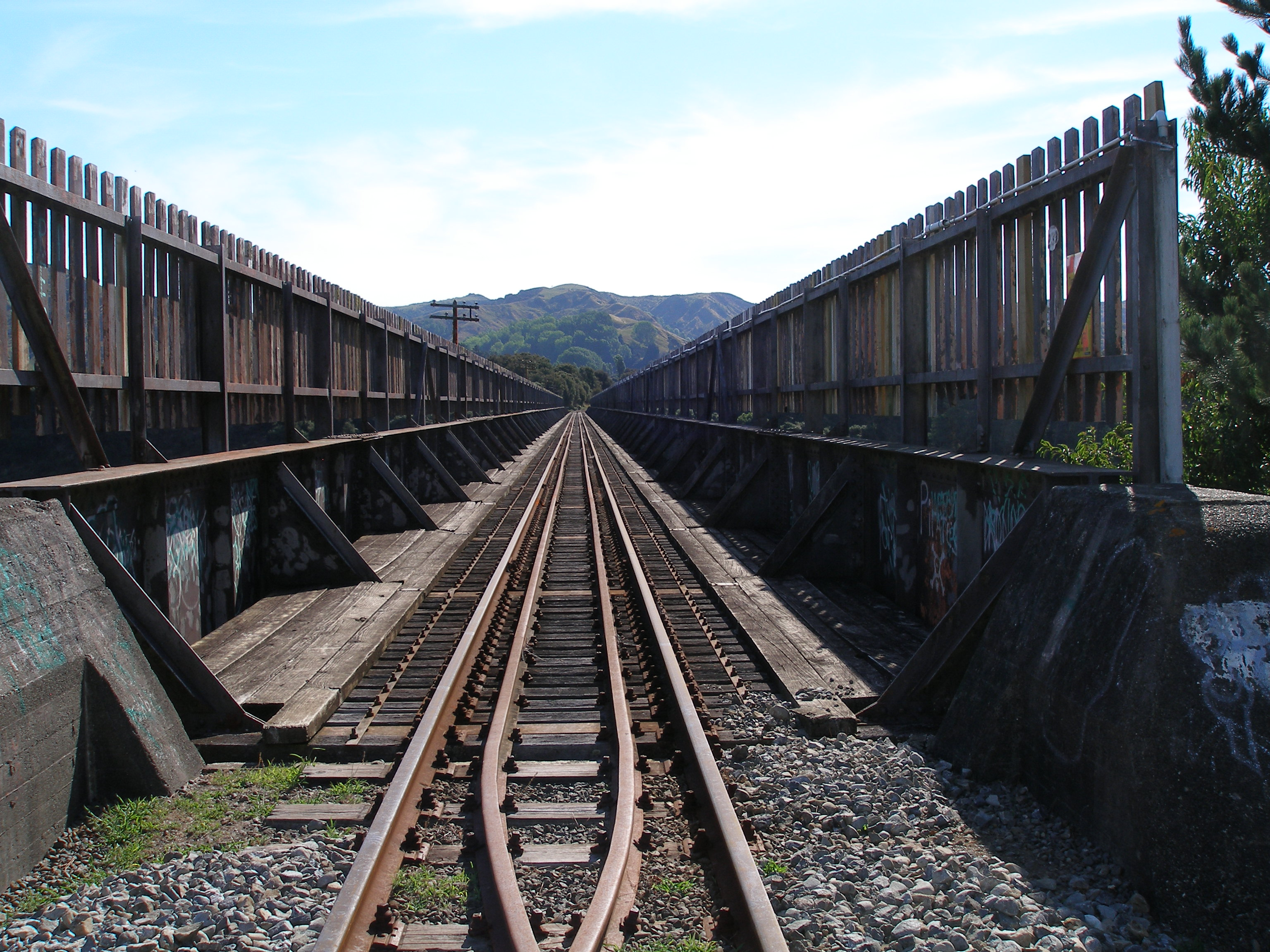
The windbreaks extend well above the plate girders.
