= Ōamaru River =

- Route of the Ōamaru River
- Mouth of the Ōamaru River Ōamaru River (North Island)
- Native name: Ōamaru (Māori)

Location
- Country: New Zealand
- Island: North Island
- Region: Hawke's Bay
- District: Taupō District, Hastings

Physical characteristics
- Source
  - coordinates: 39.10835°S 176.1656°E
- Mouth: Mōhaka River
  - coordinates: 39°04′24″S 176°16′12″E
- Length: 17 km (11 mi)

Basin features
- Progression: Ōamaru River → Mōhaka River → Hawke Bay → Pacific Ocean
- River system: Mōhaka River
- Tributaries
  - left: Te Tanae Rangiharakeke Stream, Te Whakapaiote tau ponaihu Stream, Te Whakapaeatetari Stream, Ruatea / Paimai Stream, Rangipuka Stream, Paengaroa Stream
  - right: Waitawhero Stream, Ōtorehinaiti River

The Ōamaru River is a river of the centre of New Zealand's North Island. One of the headwaters of the Mōhaka River, it flows generally northeast from its source 35 kilometres (22 mi) southeast of Tūrangi, and forms the boundary between the Kaimanawa and Kaweka Forest Parks.

== Geography ==
Much of the Ōamaru River forms the border between the Hastings District and a section of the Taupō District found in the Hawke's Bay Region.

== See also ==
- List of rivers of New Zealand
