= Joan Wiffen =

New Zealand paleontologist

Joan Wiffen CBE
- Born: Joan Pederson; 4 February 1922
- Died: 30 June 2009 (aged 87); Hastings, New Zealand
- Known for: First discovery of dinosaur fossils in New Zealand
- Spouse: Montagu Arthur "Pont" Wiffen (m. 1953)
- Awards: Morris Skinner Award
- Scientific career
- Fields: Paleontology

Joan Wiffen CBE (née Pederson; 4 February 1922 – 30 June 2009) was a self-taught New Zealand paleontologist known for discovering the first dinosaur fossils in New Zealand.

== Early life ==
Wiffen was born in 1922 and was brought up in Havelock North and the King Country. She only had a very short secondary school education as her father believed that higher education was wasted on girls, resulting in her education opportunities being limited during her youth. At the age of 16, Wiffen joined the Women's Auxiliary Air Force during World War II where she served for six years. Her work included being a medical clerk, a filter room plotter, and a runner carrying files.

== Career ==
Wiffen's interest in science came about when she bought natural history books for her small children. In the 1960s, her family joined the local Rock and Mineral Club. This sparked her interest into fossils. Wiffen and her family often travelled around the country searching for fossils in the quest to try and find a dinosaur.

In 1975 Wiffen discovered the first dinosaur fossils in New Zealand in the Mangahouanga Valley in Northern Hawkes Bay. Her first discovery was the tail bone of a theropod dinosaur. Her later finds included bones from a hypsilophodont, a pterosaur, an ankylosaur, mosasaurs and plesiosaurs. In 1999, Wiffen discovered the vertebra bone of a titanosaur in a tributary of the Te Hoe River. The fossils Wiffen found are primarily held in a GNS Science collection.

Wiffen was self-taught in extracting the bones from the rock, which involved much trial and error. As she lacked formal training and qualifications, she faced scepticism about the validity of her findings. She was therefore unable to present her paper on her dinosaur bone finding at the 1980 Gondwana Conference at Victoria University, which instead had to be presented by another recognised palaeontologist, Dr Ralph Molnar.

== Honours and awards ==
Wiffen was awarded an honorary DSc by Massey University in 1994. In the 1995 New Year Honours, she was appointed a Commander of the Order of the British Empire for services to science. In 2004, she won the Morris Skinner Award from the Society of Vertebrate Paleontology. In 2017, Wiffen was selected as one of the Royal Society Te Apārangi's "150 women in 150 words", celebrating the contributions of women to knowledge in New Zealand.

== Personal life ==
In 1953 she married Pont Wiffen and they had two children. She dedicated the next two decades of her life to her family and maintaining their farm in Hawke's Bay farm. Joan Wiffen died at the age of 87 on 30 June 2009 in Hastings Hospital.
