= Taharua River =

River in New Zealand

- Route of the Taharua River
- Mouth of the Taharua River Taharua River (North Island)
- Native name: Taharua (Māori)

Location
- Country: New Zealand
- Island: North Island
- Region: Hawke's Bay
- District: Taupō

Physical characteristics
- Source
  - location: Taharua
  - coordinates: 38.9081°S 176.27383°E
- Mouth: Mōhaka River
  - coordinates: 39°04′49″S 176°18′06″E

Basin features
- Progression: Taharua River → Mōhaka River → Hawke Bay → Pacific Ocean
- River system: Mōhaka River
- Tributaries
  - left: Te Waiotewhana Stream, Motupotako Stream
  - right: Omomoko Stream, Haehaeharakeke Stream, Waione Stream, Ngararanui Stream, Mangatoatoa Stream, Mangatamingimingi Stream, Ohaoko Stream, Te Whata Manawanui Stream
- Waterfalls: Te Rere Falls

The Taharua River is a river of the northwestern Hawke's Bay region of New Zealand's North Island. It flows south from its origins 25 kilometres southwest of Taupō to reach the Mohaka River of which it is one of the earliest tributaries.

== See also ==
- List of rivers of New Zealand
