= Kaimanawa Forest Park =

Conservation park in New Zealand

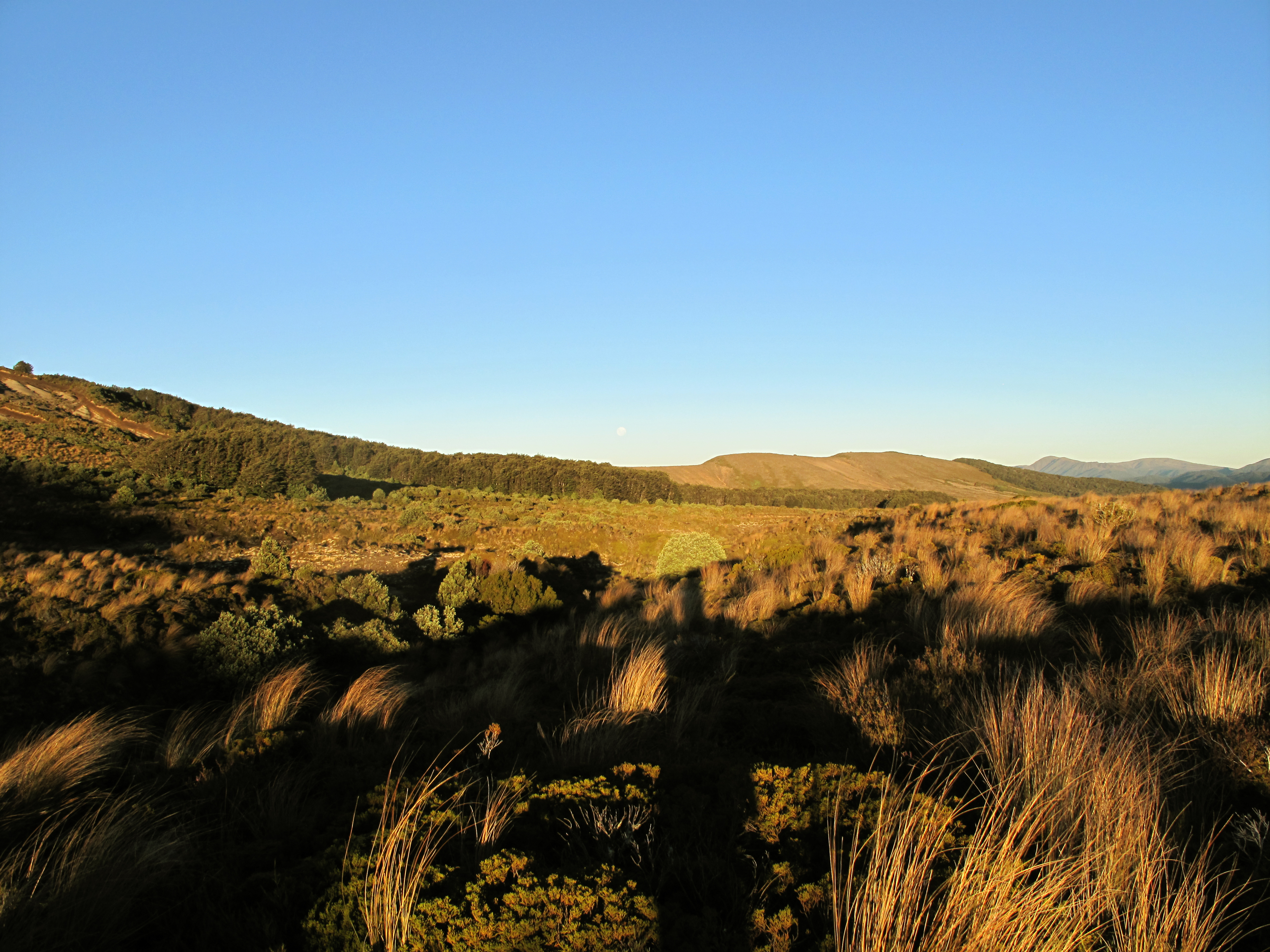
- Kaimanawa Ranges

- Location within New Zealand
- Location: New Zealand
- Coordinates: 39.2096451°S 175.8312464°E
- Area: 75,957 hectares (187,690 acres)
- Established: 1969
- Governing body: Department of Conservation

Kaimanawa Forest Park is a protected area south of Lake Taupō and east of Mount Tongariro in the Taupō Volcanic Zone. It is situated in the Rangitikei District and Manawatū-Whanganui Region of New Zealand's North Island.

The park is managed by the New Zealand Department of Conservation.

== Geography ==
The park covers 75,957 hectares (187,690 acres).

== History ==
The park was established in 1969.
