= Kaweka Forest Park =

Forest park in New Zealand

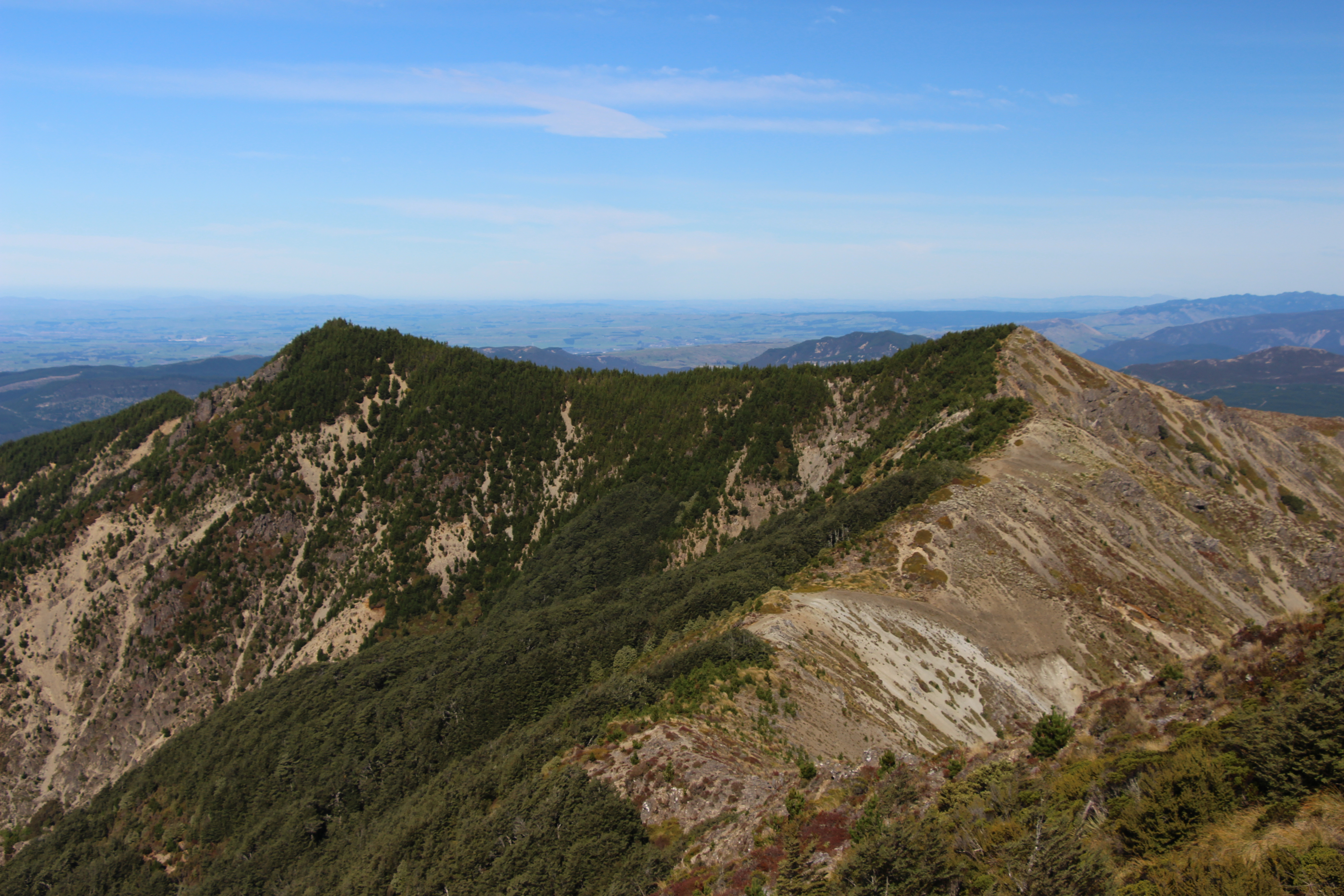
- The Kaweka Range near Two Tits (1418 m)

- Location within New Zealand
- Location: North Island, New Zealand
- Nearest town: Napier
- Coordinates: 39.26°S 176.38°E
- Area: 59,425.7 hectares (146,844 acres)
- Governing body: Department of Conservation

Kaweka Forest Park is in the Hawke's Bay region of New Zealand, adjacent to Kaimanawa Forest Park. This region of the central North Island contains large tracts of pine plantations, some of them also within the park, and as a consequence, invasive wilding conifers are present throughout the 594 km^{2} (229 sq mi) park.

The highest peak in the park is Kaweka at 1,724 metres (5,656 ft).

The Mangatutu Hot Springs, in the vicinity of the Mōhaka River, are in the park.

== History ==
In the late 1800s European settlers cleared the land for farming. However, the steep terrain and poor soil made it difficult to farm. By 1900 farming had ceased, and the park became a State Forest in the 1960s. During this period it was replanted with exotic pine trees and was turned into a Forest Park in 1972.

== Climate ==
Climate data for Kaweka Forest (1981–2010 normals, extremes 1967–1993)
Month	Jan	Feb	Mar	Apr	May	Jun	Jul	Aug	Sep	Oct	Nov	Dec	Year
Record high °C (°F)	32.1 (89.8)	32.1 (89.8)	30.1 (86.2)	24.6 (76.3)	23.0 (73.4)	21.4 (70.5)	18.9 (66.0)	21.0 (69.8)	22.9 (73.2)	26.2 (79.2)	30.0 (86.0)	32.0 (89.6)	32.1 (89.8)
Mean daily maximum °C (°F)	22.7 (72.9)	22.2 (72.0)	20.4 (68.7)	17.5 (63.5)	14.7 (58.5)	12.3 (54.1)	11.5 (52.7)	12.2 (54.0)	14.4 (57.9)	16.6 (61.9)	18.7 (65.7)	20.8 (69.4)	17.0 (62.6)
Daily mean °C (°F)	17.5 (63.5)	17.3 (63.1)	15.6 (60.1)	13.2 (55.8)	11.0 (51.8)	8.7 (47.7)	8.0 (46.4)	8.3 (46.9)	10.2 (50.4)	12.0 (53.6)	13.8 (56.8)	16 (61)	12.6 (54.8)
Mean daily minimum °C (°F)	12.2 (54.0)	12.5 (54.5)	10.8 (51.4)	8.9 (48.0)	7.2 (45.0)	5.1 (41.2)	4.4 (39.9)	4.4 (39.9)	6.0 (42.8)	7.5 (45.5)	8.9 (48.0)	11.1 (52.0)	8.3 (46.9)
Record low °C (°F)	5.1 (41.2)	3.5 (38.3)	2.8 (37.0)	1.0 (33.8)	−0.9 (30.4)	−8.0 (17.6)	−2.1 (28.2)	−1.6 (29.1)	−1.3 (29.7)	0.0 (32.0)	1.5 (34.7)	2.2 (36.0)	−8.0 (17.6)
Average rainfall mm (inches)	97.1 (3.82)	114.4 (4.50)	124.8 (4.91)	103.4 (4.07)	93.8 (3.69)	87.9 (3.46)	146.6 (5.77)	91.3 (3.59)	101.8 (4.01)	90.5 (3.56)	112.6 (4.43)	114.7 (4.52)	1,278.9 (50.33)
Source: NIWA

== See also ==
- Kaweka Range
- Forest parks of New Zealand
- Tramping in New Zealand
