= Ngāti Hineuru =

Māori iwi (tribe)in Aotearoa (New Zealand)

- Iwi (tribe) in Māoridom

Ngāti Hineuru is a Māori iwi (social unit) of New Zealand. In 2015 they reached a Treaty of Waitangi settlement of nearly $50 million with the New Zealand government.

== See also ==
- List of Māori iwi
