= Mōhaka River =

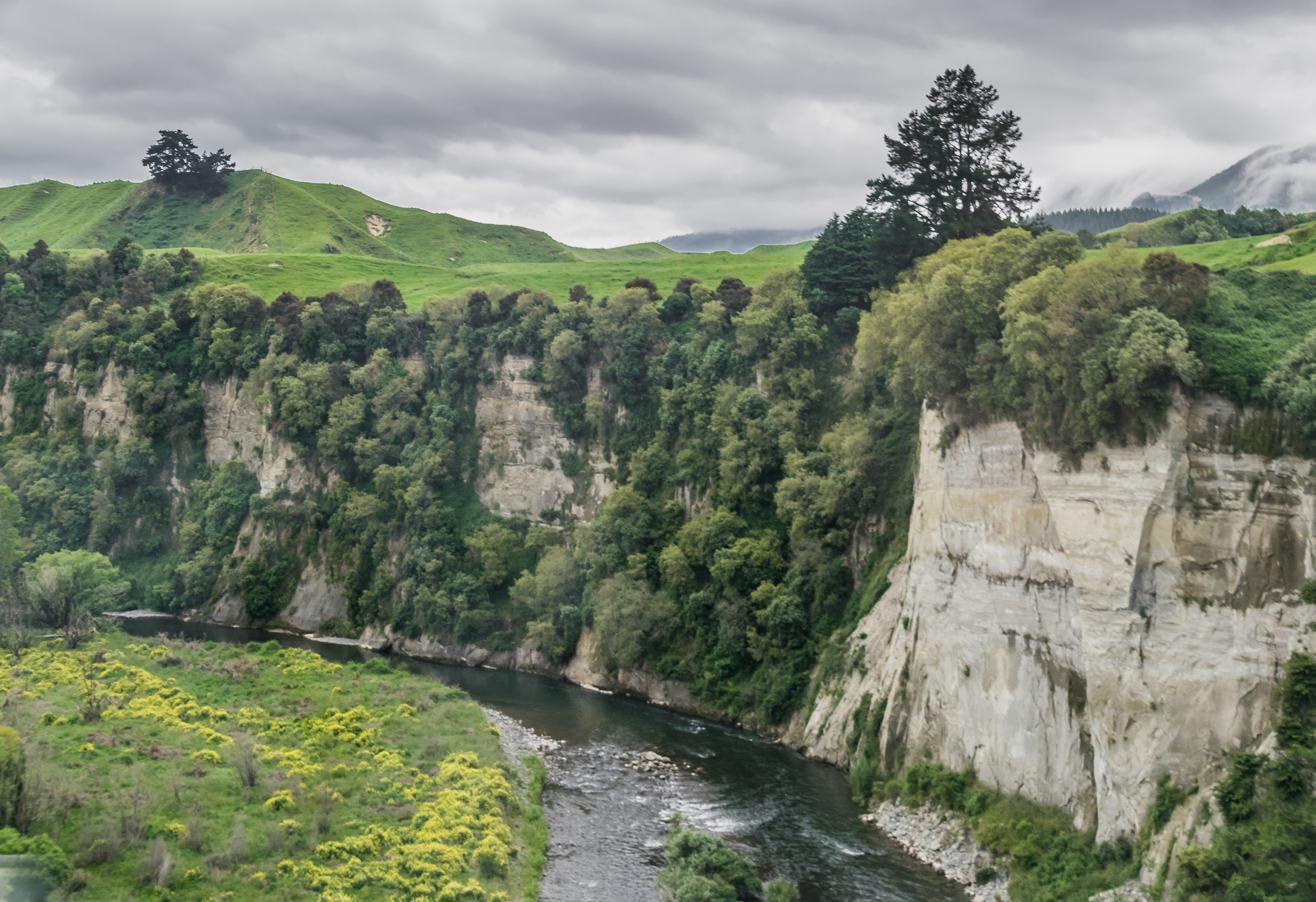
- Mōhaka River viewed from the State Highway 5 bridge
- Native name: Mōhaka (Māori)

Location
- Country: New Zealand
- Island: North Island
- Region: Hawke's Bay
- District: Taupō, Hastings, Wairoa

Physical characteristics
- Source: Confluence of the Kaipo River and Ōamaru River
  - location: Kaimanawa Forest
  - coordinates: 39.0932°S 176.2372°E
- Mouth: Hawke Bay
  - location: Mōhaka
  - coordinates: 39.1243°S 177.1930°E
  - elevation: Sea level
- Length: 172 kilometres (107 mi)
- Discharge
  - average: 81 m^{3}/s (2,900 cu ft/s)

Basin features
- Progression: Mōhaka River → Hawke Bay → Pacific Ocean
- River system: Mōhaka River
- Tributaries
  - left: Taharua River, Otupua Stream, Ripia River, Matawhero Stream, Puneketoro Stream, Waiunutoki Stream, Ōwhiria Stream, Ngakokaho Stream, Waipunga River, Ōwharau Stream, Mangakara Stream, Te Awaokaiwhaka Stream, Tarariki Stream, Poamoko Stream, Mangakurupatu Stream, Te Hoe River, Mangapuru Stream, Waewae Creek, Whenanui Stream, Ōtara Stream, Arikanihi Stream, Kōkakowhāia Stream, Tūtūmaru Stream, Pakihikura Stream, Mangawharangi Stream, Mangatūranga Stream, Te Rapa Stream
  - right: Mangapapa Stream, Orakei Stream, Mangaroa Stream, Te Mimiohinekaitangi Stream, Te Kohai Stream, Mangatanguru Stream, Mangatainoka River, Mākino River, Mangatutunui Stream, Makahu River, Inangatahi Stream, Mangōwhata Stream, Mimiha Stream, Kākāpōnui Stream, Waitara Stream, Rangiwhakahāroa Stream, Anticline Creek, Heruheru Stream, Kākāriki Stream, Kiwi Stream, Mangapora Stream, Kateniha Stream, Pōhuenui Stream, Coquet Stream
- Bridges: Mohaka Bridge, Willowflat Bridge, Mohaka Viaduct, Mohaka River Bridge, Mohaka Township Bridge

The Mōhaka River is on the North Island of New Zealand in the east central region of Hawke’s Bay. Mōhaka is a Maori word, roughly translated it means “place for dancing”. The iwi (Māori tribes) associated with the Mōhaka River are Ngāti Pāhauwera, Ngāti Hineuru, Ngāti Tūwharetoa and Mana Ahuriri. The headwaters are found in the Kaweka and Kaimanawa ranges. From the range it winds southeast before twisting northeast and finally southeast again to empty into the Pacific Ocean near the town of Mōhaka. There are many gorges on the Mōhaka; some as steep as 200 m (660 ft). Its main tributaries are the Waipunga, Taharua, Hautapu rivers. The full length is 172 kilometres (107 mi) and it drains a basin of 2,357 square kilometres (910 sq mi). The Mohaka Viaduct is a railway bridge over the lower Mōhaka river. The Napier–Taupo road (State Highway 5) has had several bridges over the upper Mōhaka, with the current one built in 1962.

== History ==
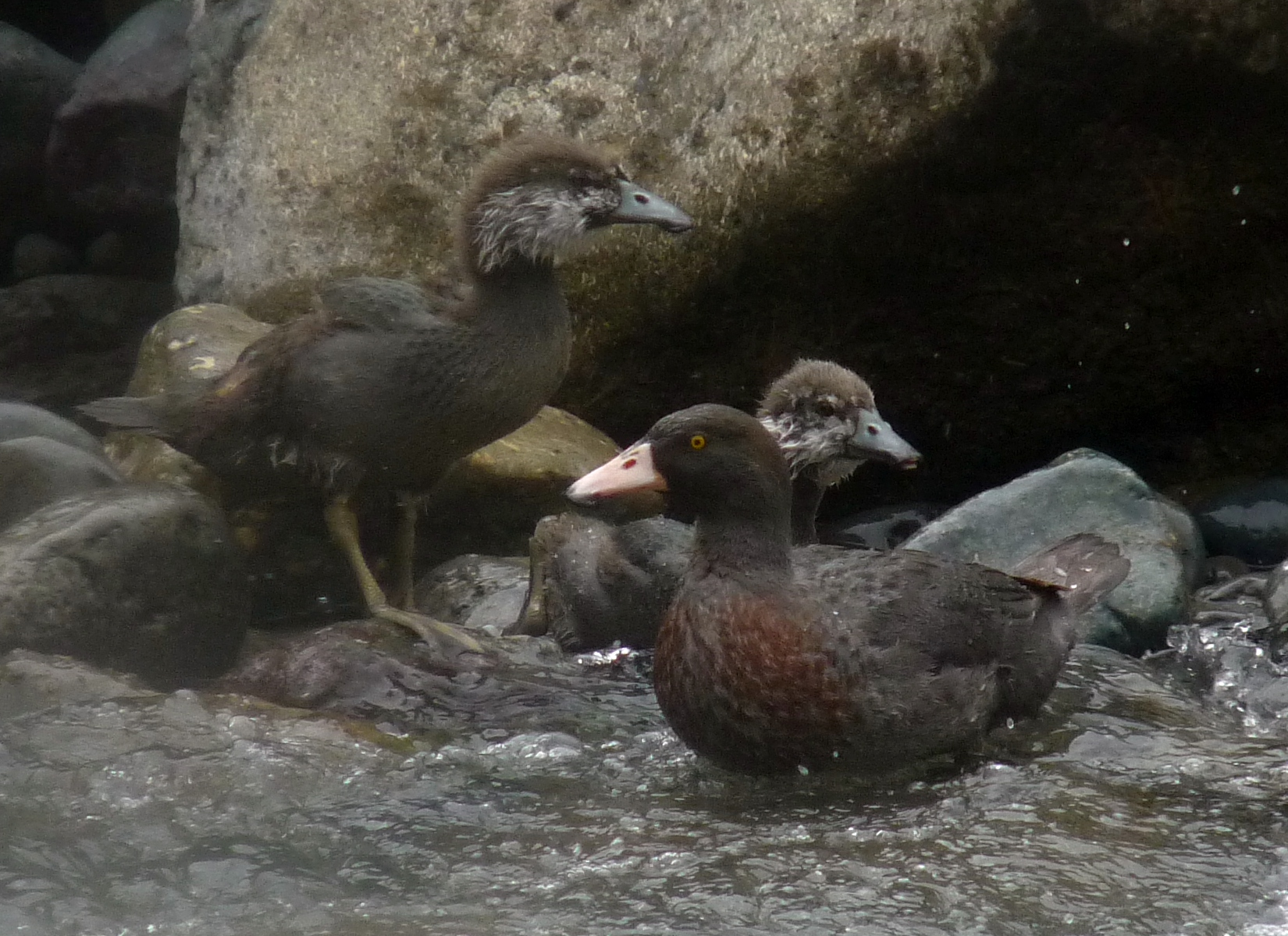
Endangered blue ducks are often seen on the Mōhaka

Ngāti Pāhauwera's traditional tribal territory is from the Te Hoe river junction to its mouth. The river, including its waters, bed and fisheries, is a taonga of Ngati Pahauwera. In particular they place great emphasis on the role the river plays in their tribal identity.

The Mōhaka was an important river for fishing and transport long before the settlers arrived. Archeological surveys have found extensive evidence of villages and temporary camps along the lower and upper Mōhaka. The Maori collected hāngī stones, taupunga, opunga, poutama, kowhaturi from the riverbed.

The famous Maori, Te Kooti, reportedly frequented the area. Te Kooti's Lookout, said to be the site of a fight with the British, is visible from the river. Later, Europeans used the Mōhaka to transport timber. In 2004 a water conservation order was placed on the upper section of the Mōhaka because of its fantastic fishing, scenic gorges and outstanding amenity for recreation. The area is also an important habitat for the rare blue duck.

More recently it is a popular spot for rafting, kayaking, tramping and fishing.

== Course and characteristics ==
=== Kaweka Forest Park ===
Up in the Kaweka range the Mōhaka is a twisting grade II river with a bit of grade III. There are several Department of Conservation (DOC) campsites, hot pools and plenty of undisturbed native bush. After approximately 36 km, it comes out of the Kawekas and farmland becomes more common The river bends itself into an oxbow and shortly after rapids become larger as it leads into the grade III section. DOC campsites are still found along this 68 km stretch.

=== Everett's Camp to Te Kooti Bridge ===
As the more technical grade III rapids begin the river flows past native bush of the Tataraakina block on the left and Waitere Station on the right. This section contains Te Hoe's rapid, which is the largest and longest in this section. There are 3 gorges to be appreciated on this run.

=== Te Kooti Bridge to Willow Flat ===
Te Kooti’ s bridge marks the start of the grade V and the end of the grade III. After the bridge, it is an easy grade II float for about 4 km then the banks get steeper and the rapids start off with the largest one on the river, Long Rapid. Scenery on this stretch includes massive boulders, waterfalls falling from the steep canyon walls and fascinating erosion patterns created by the water on the soft stones. The rapids are continuous for the full 18 km with the grade being mostly III+ with some exciting IV/V.

=== Willow Flat to Mōhaka township ===
The final stretch of the river after the grade V returns to grade II as it mellows and flows into the ocean. More steep walled banks of river and side creeks can be seen down this section as they cascade down, creating substantially high tiered waterfalls and smaller side gorges. The vegetation changes to become more lush, featuring silver fern or punga, eventually easing off to cleared farm land towards the ocean

== Flow ==
Water level is usually highest in the spring, dropping naturally throughout the summer but can rise quickly in heavy rains. Slips are common and trees can sometimes be found drifting or jammed between boulders. There is an automatic river gauge which posts water level information (NIWA) or contact the local rafting companies for current conditions.

== Geology ==
Much of the Mōhaka runs through sedimentary rock. In the upper sections, greywacke commonly forms the steeper banks with smaller stones and shingle forming shallow beds and beaches. Conglomerate, sandstone and limestone begin to dominate the banks and large boulders create the rapids down through the grade III section.

Moving closer to the grade V section, the boulders become larger and the banks narrow into a deep gorge. Large conglomerate blocks form the first rapid then the river eases into a sedimentary rock canyon. The boulders, while impressive in size, are even more intriguing because of the holes and depressions the water has carved into them. House rock worth a closer look; the center has been carved out and is accessible only by a hole in the side. Fossilized shells and organic matter have been remarkably well preserved in the stones.

After the Willow Flat Bridge, the size and frequency of large boulders decreases to be replaced by steep vegetation covered terraces. Sandstone and mudstone become more prevalent as the river approaches the ocean, as does farmland.

Approximately seven fault lines cross the Mōhaka River. Most are found in the upper section but the most obvious to untrained observers is found just above a rapid called Red Rock in the grade III section. It becomes apparent a fault has been crossed as the type of rock changes almost instantly.

== Recreation ==
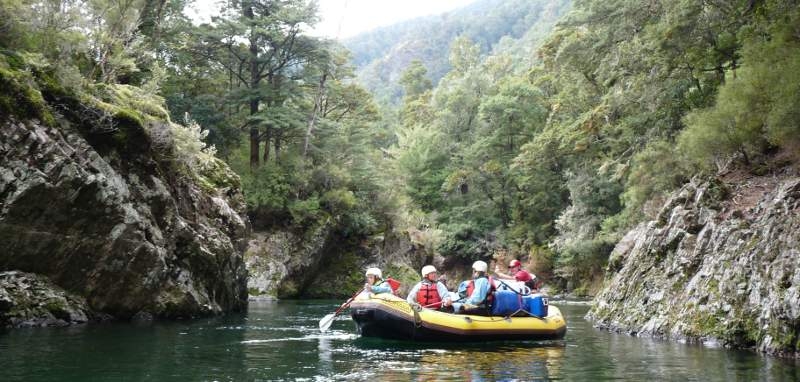
Floating through the native forest of the upper Mōhaka

Commercial rafting is run on all sections of the Mōhaka. Most sections can be run as a day trip or sections can be combined into multi day adventures.

The Mōhaka offers something for any level of kayaking. Beginners will find plenty of eddies and waves on the grade II sections while intermediate kayakers will find the grade III more challenging. The grade V is a technical run for more advanced kayakers. Local rafting companies have the most up-to-date information and can often assist in setting up a shuttle.

The upper section is the most popular destination for fishing in Hawke's Bay. Trout is a common catch, along with various varieties of native fish. Mainly brown trout are found above Pakaututu bridge and rainbow trout below. Fishing is not as good on the lower sections but the rapids are more exciting and challenging.

Hiking is popular along the upper section. Trails lead to the hot springs and access the river in various places along the way. They are maintained by the Department of Conservation.

Hunting for sika and red deer as well as pigs and goats is common. A permit is required.

== Gallery ==
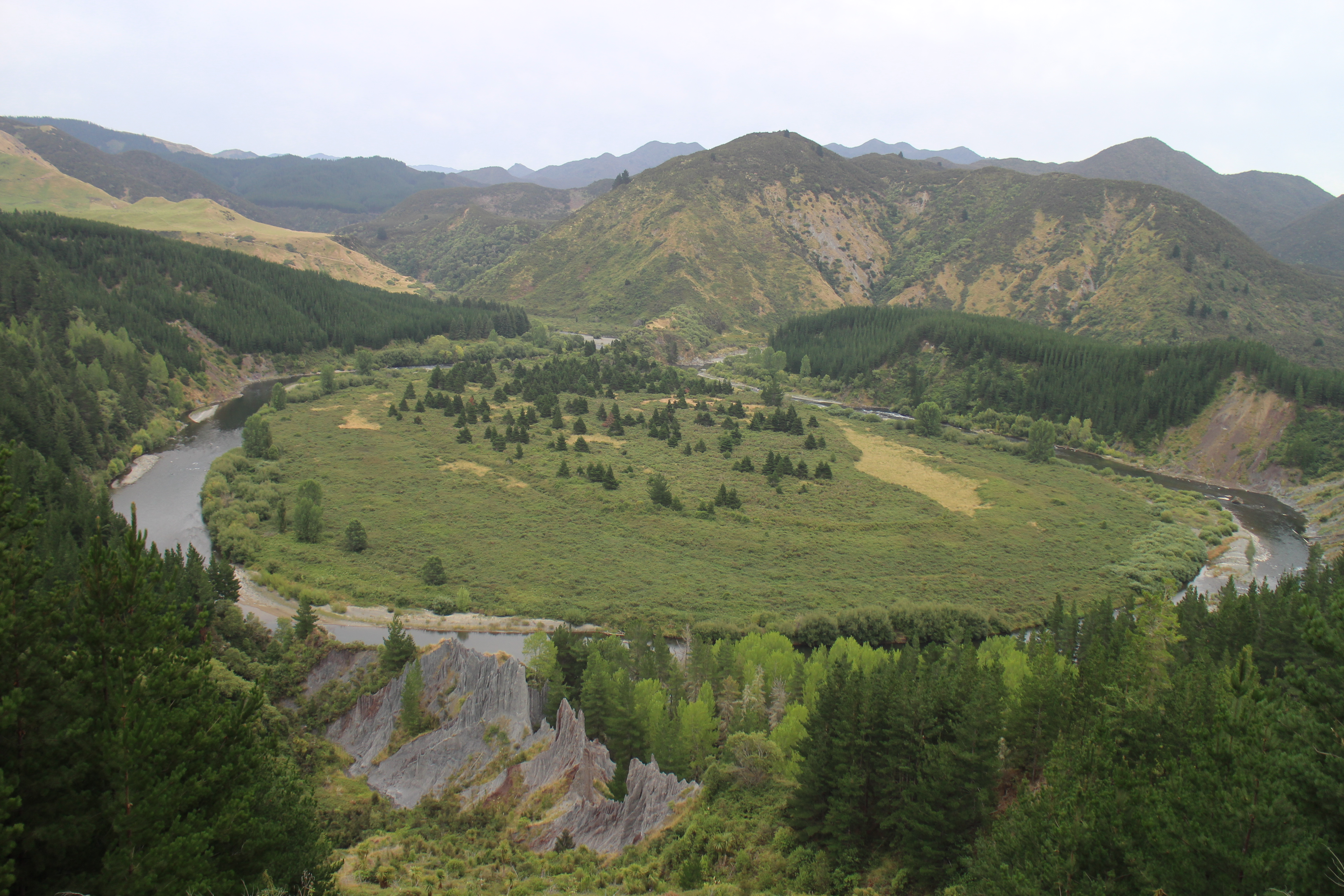
Mōhaka bends into an oxbow. The rock formation called the Organs is near the bottom of the photo.

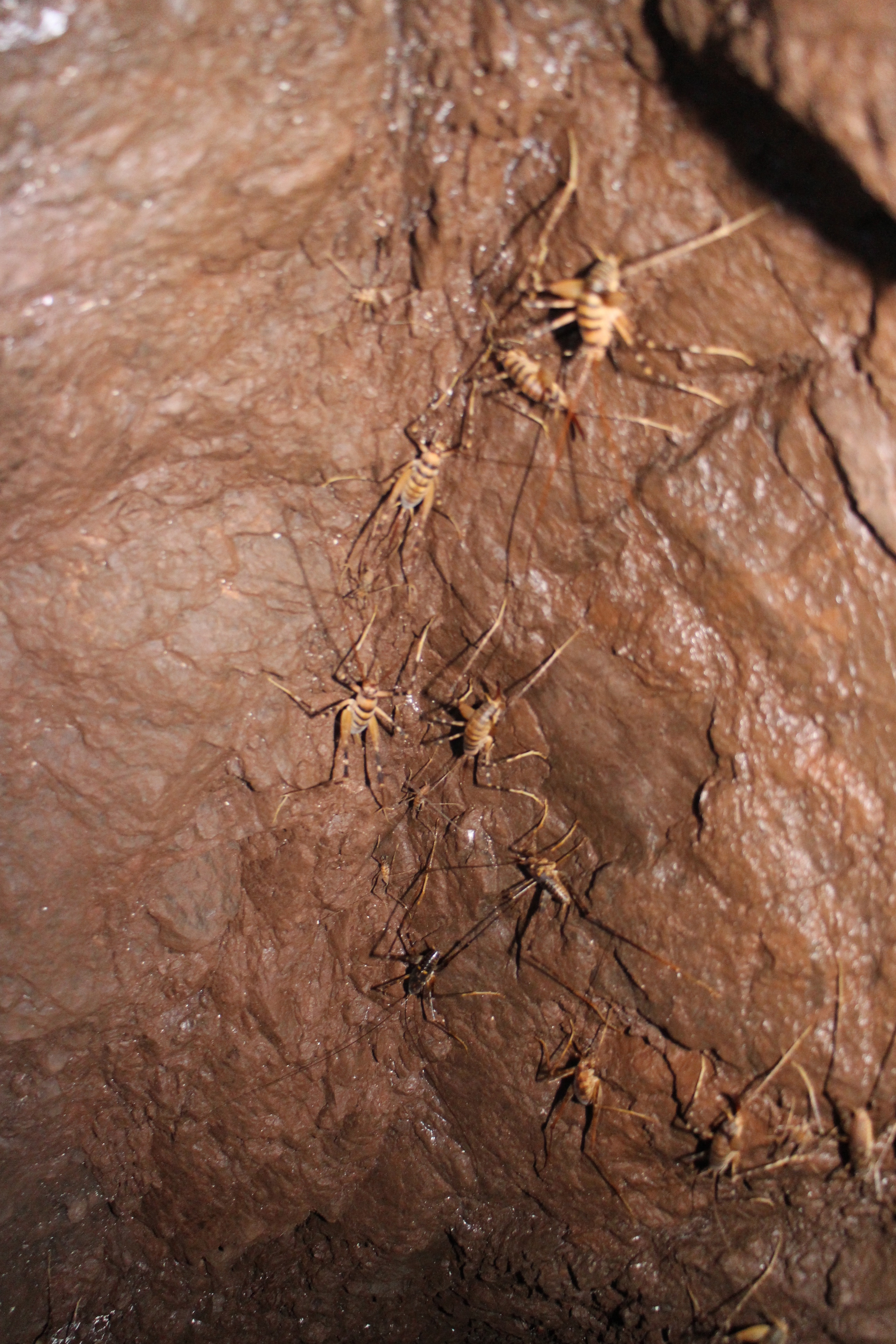
Wētā found in an abandoned gold mine on the Mōhaka river.

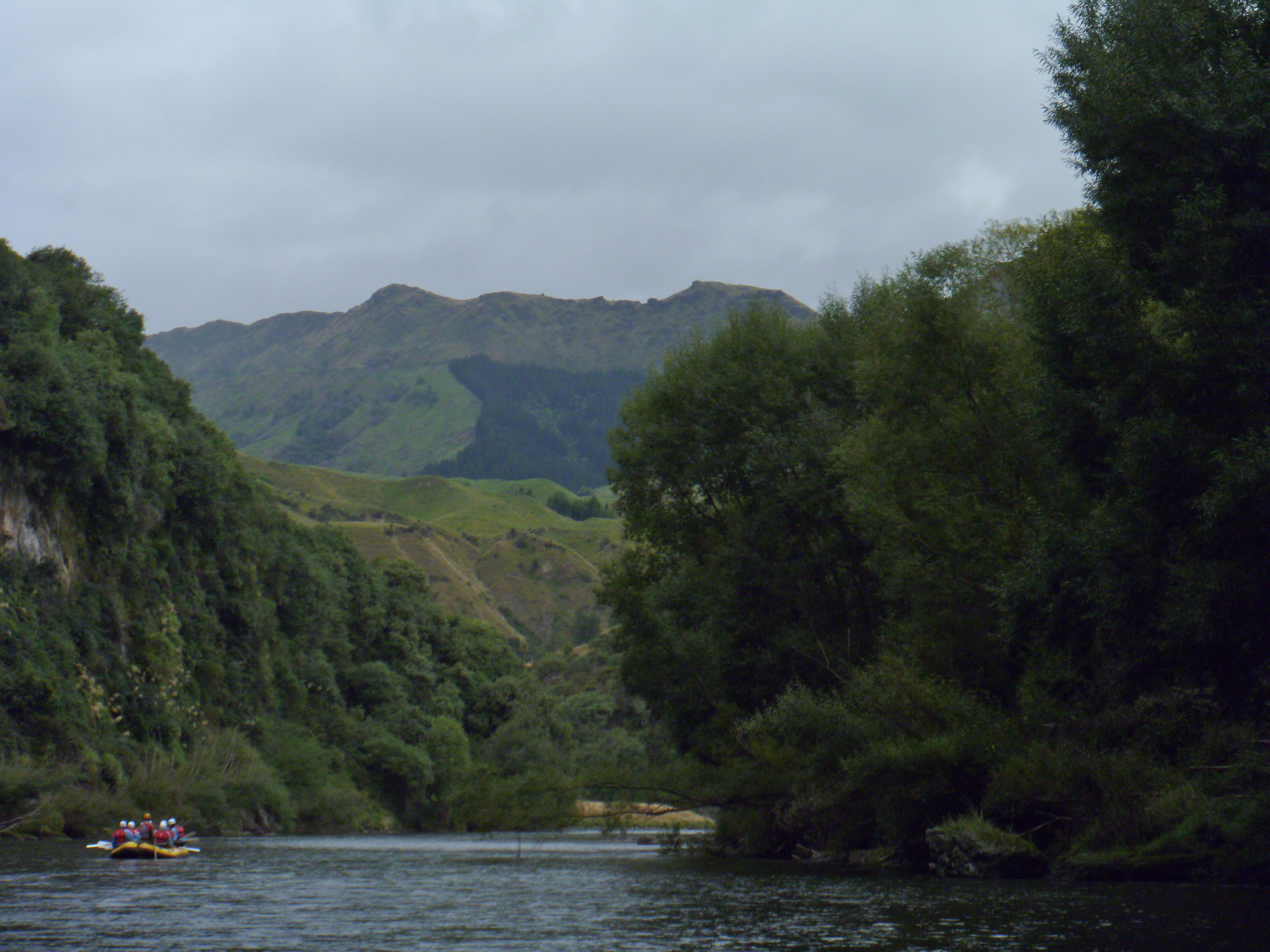
Scenery on the Grade 2 Mōhaka River.

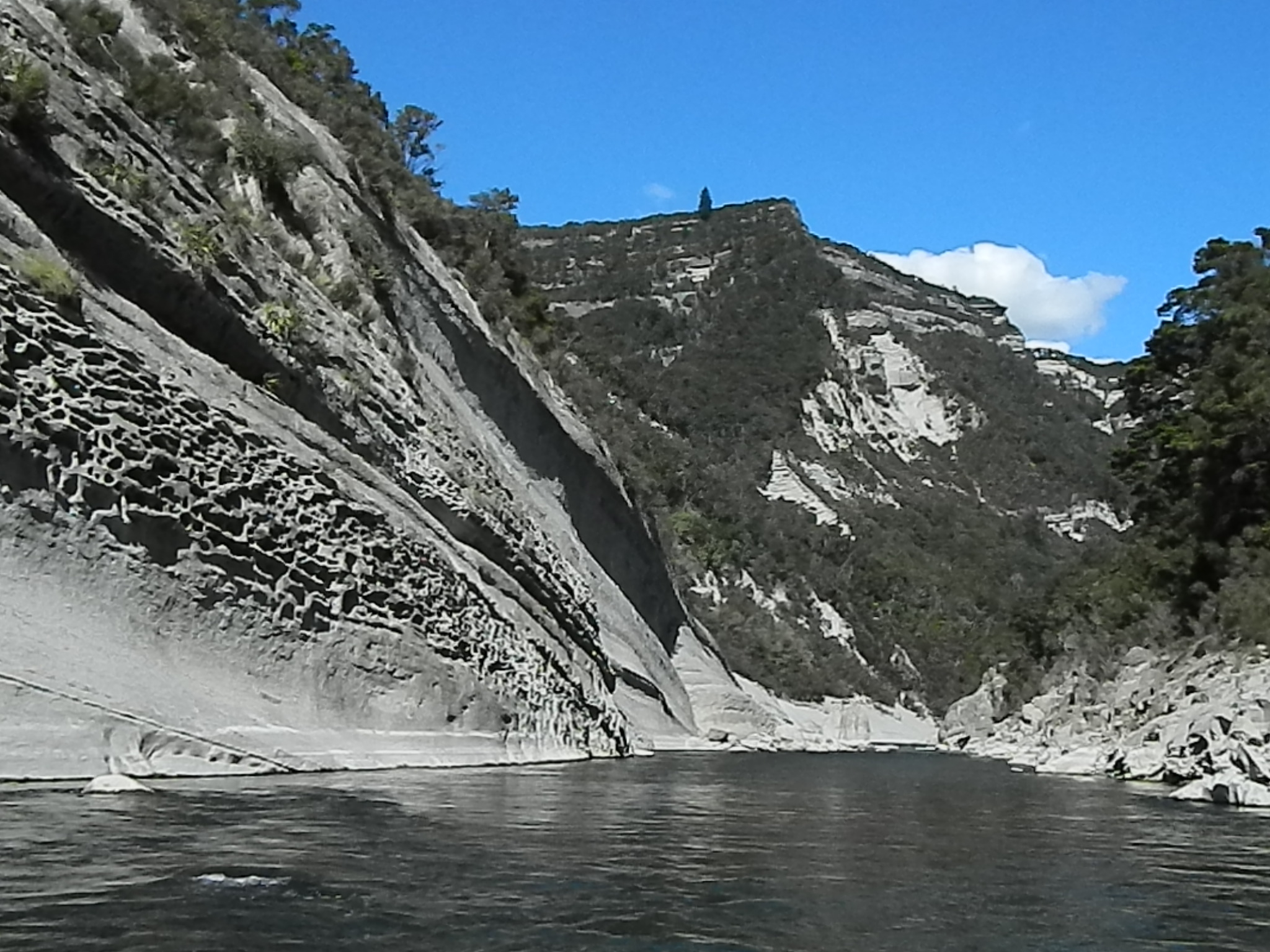
Sedimentary Rock Gorge Mōhaka River.

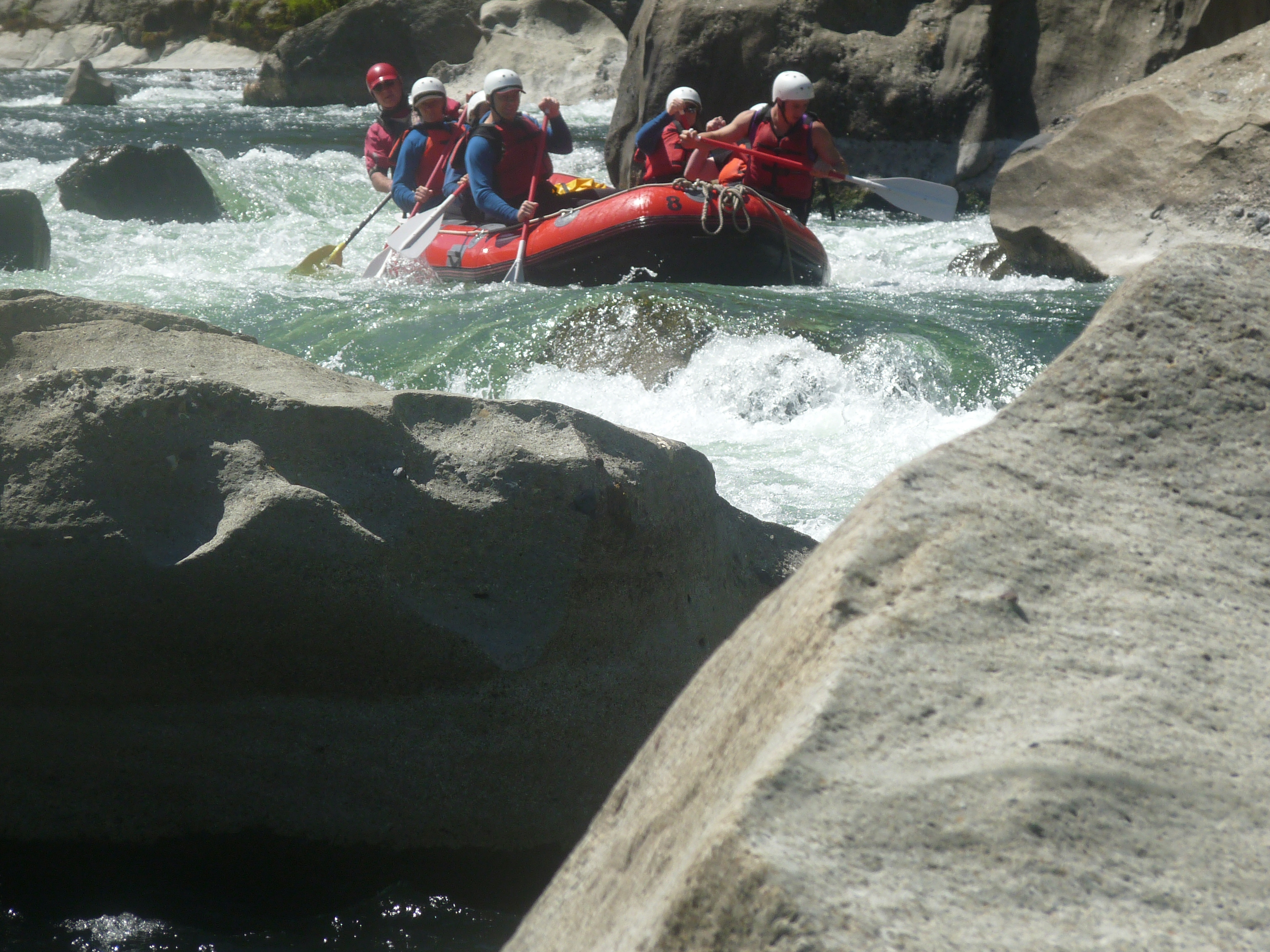
Rocks on the Grade 3.

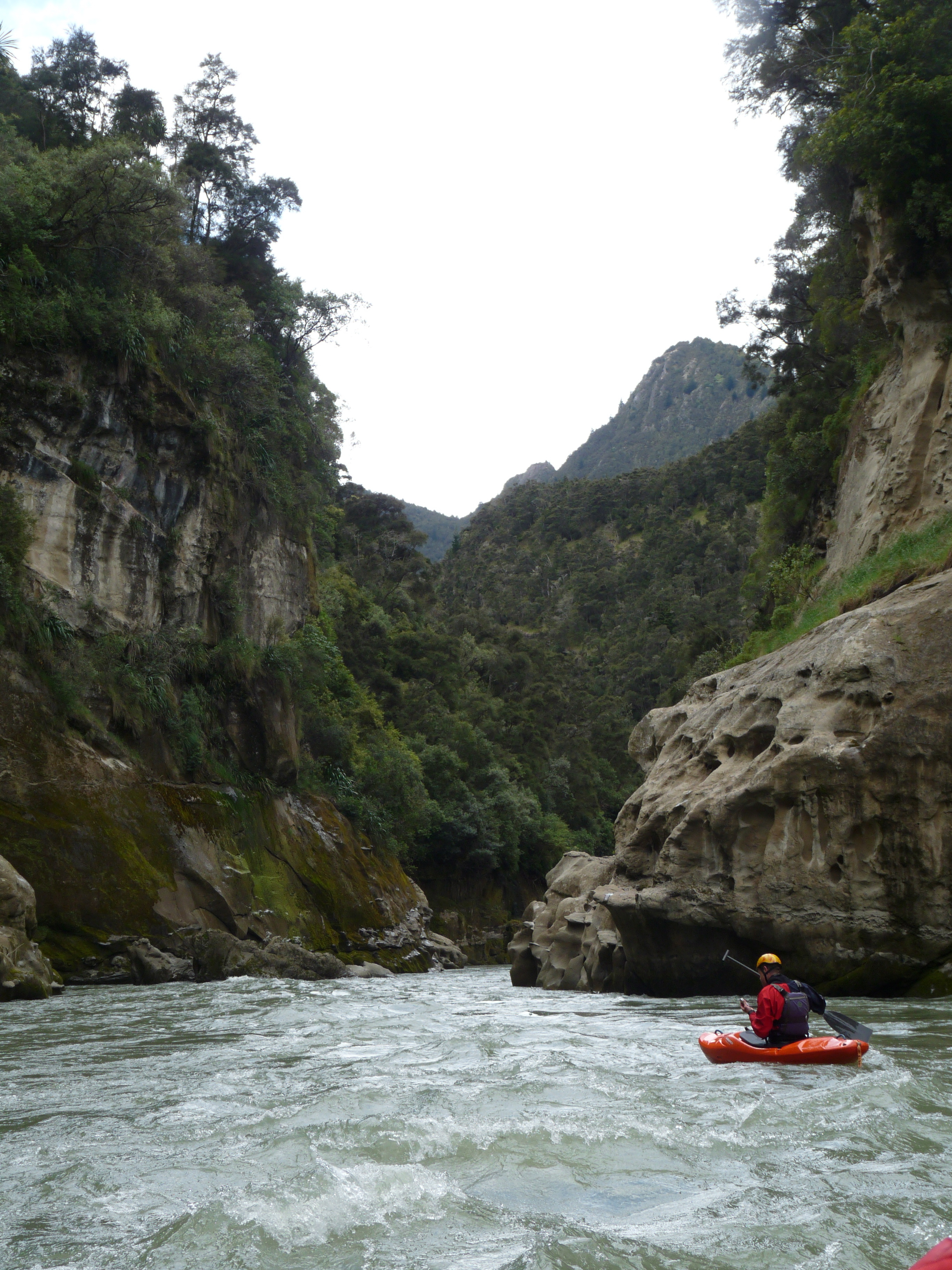
Kayaking the Mōhaka.

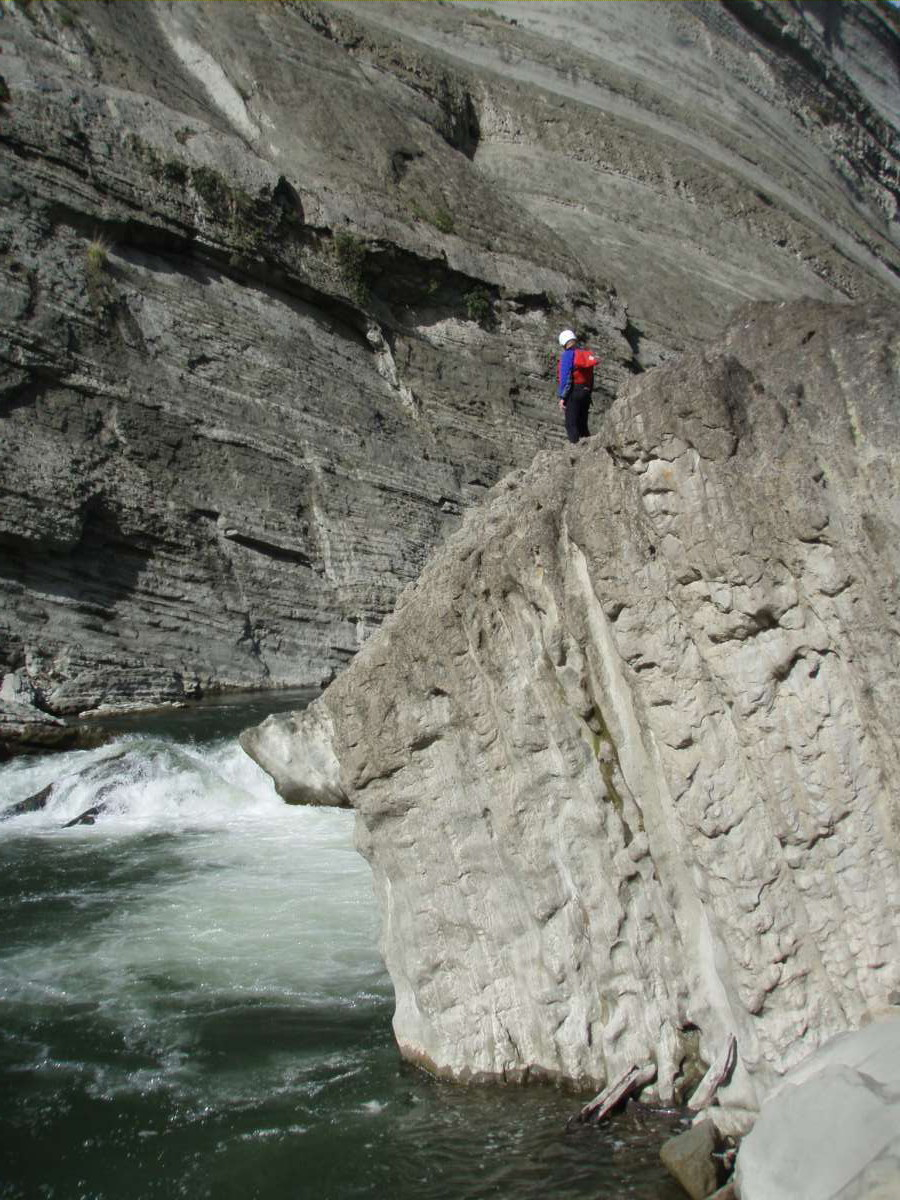
Large Boulders Gr.5 Mōhaka River.

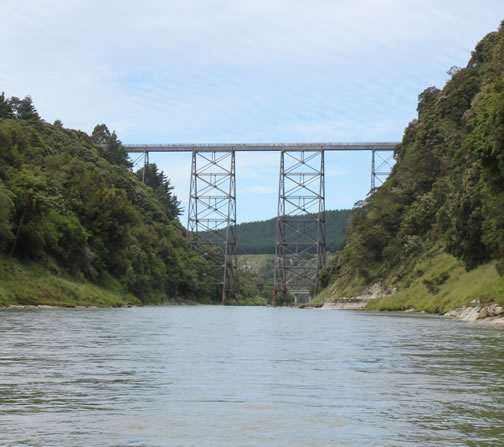
Mohaka Viaduct.

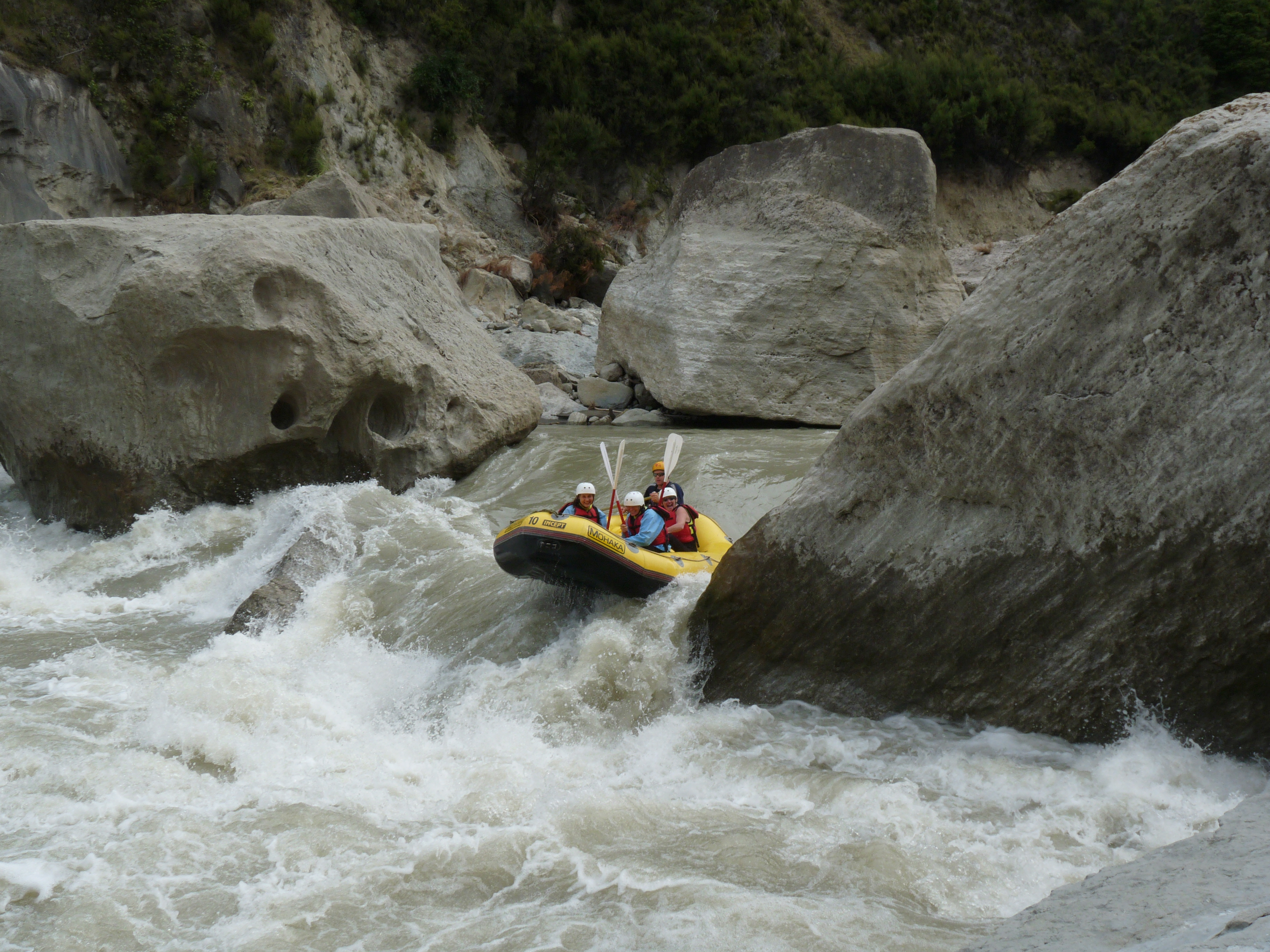
Big boulders creating rapids on the Grade 5

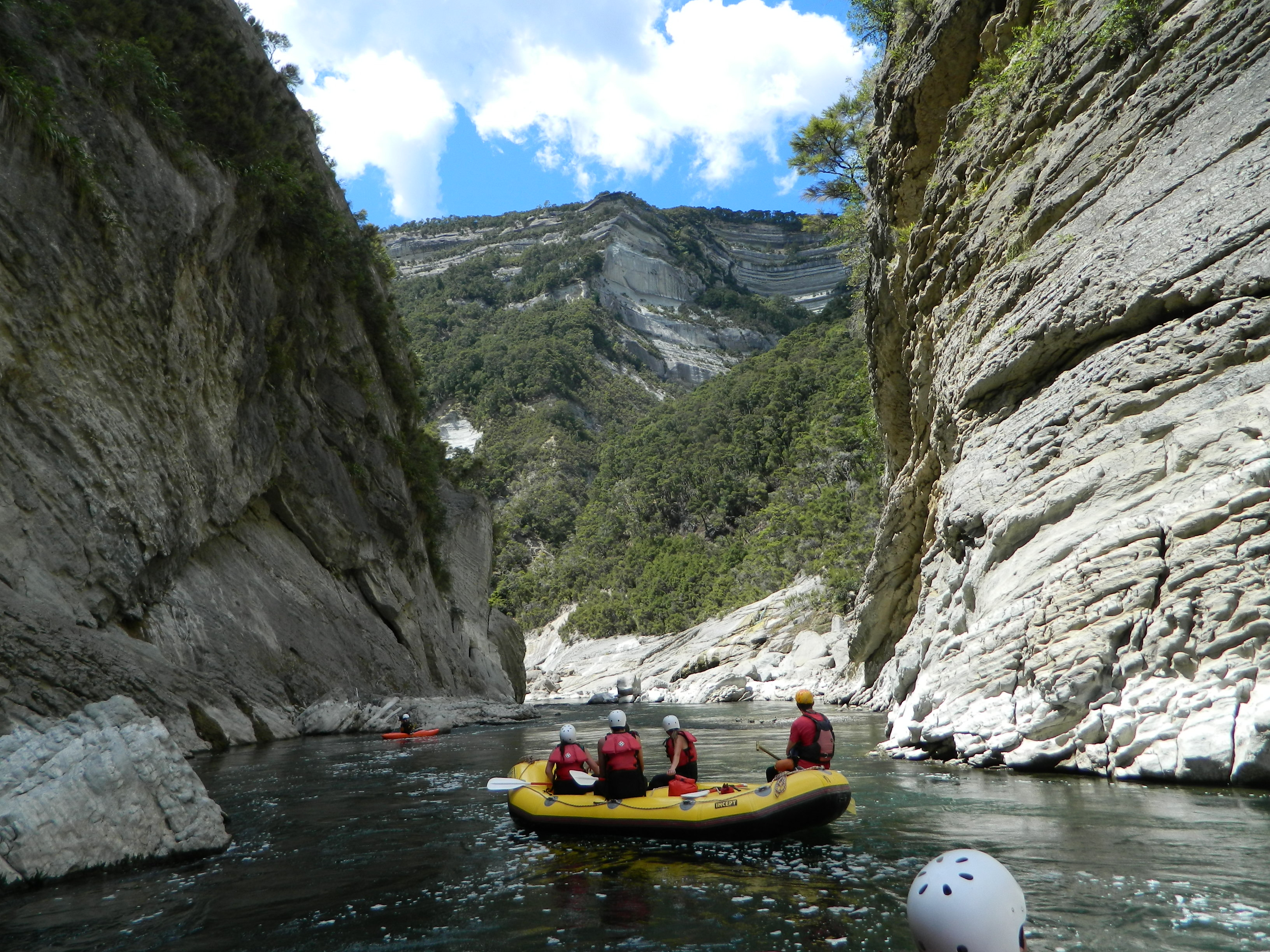
Canyon on the Grade 5

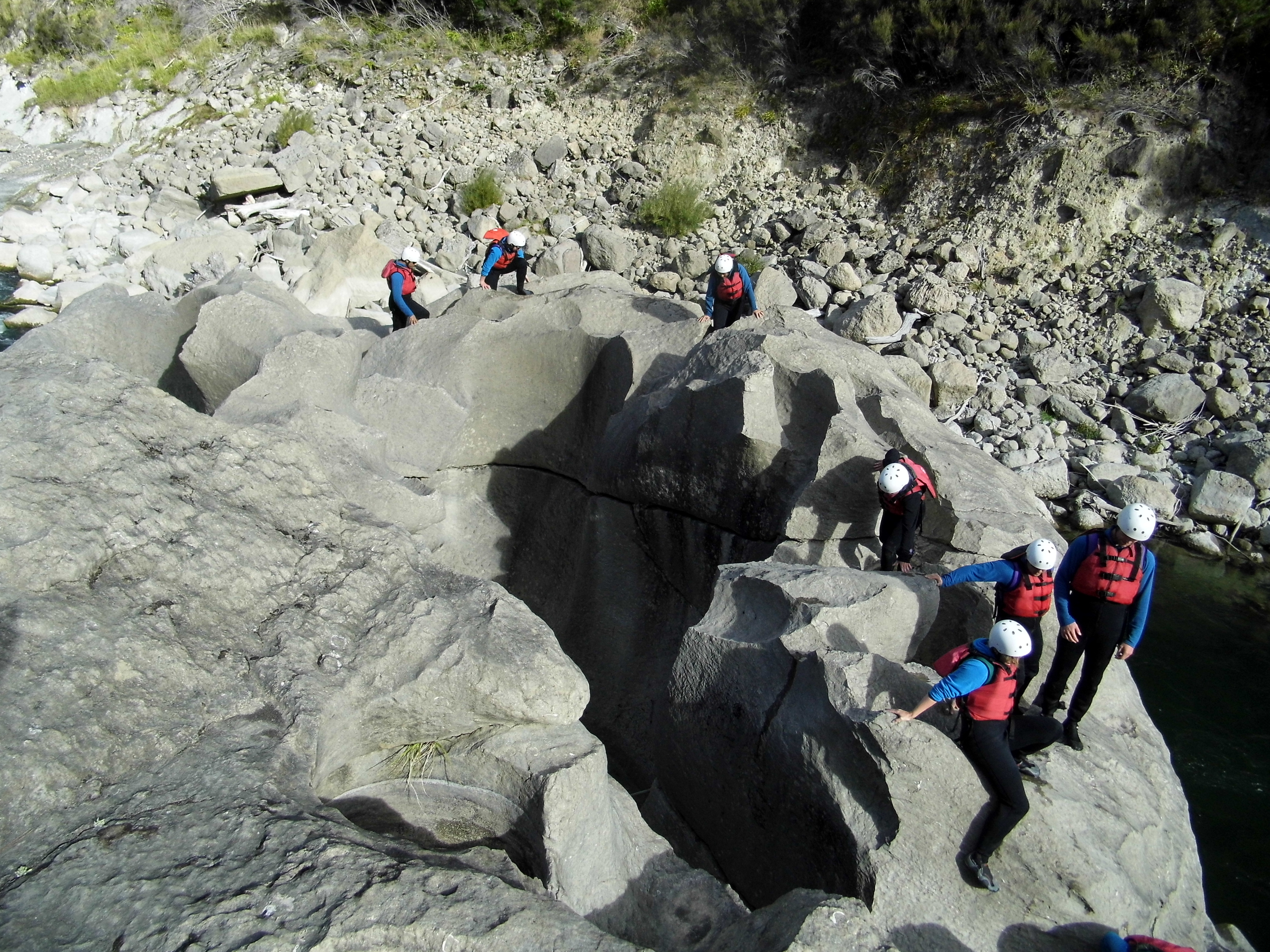
House Rock

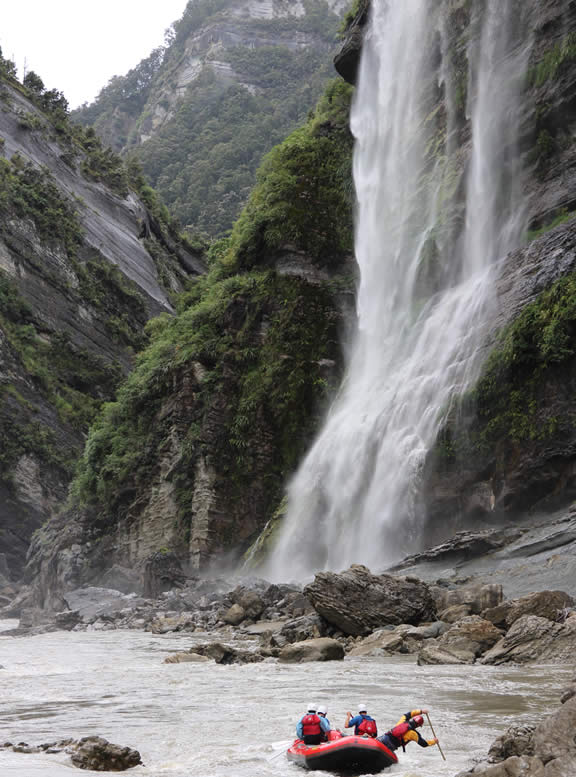
Waterfall halfway down Long Rapid, Grade V Section

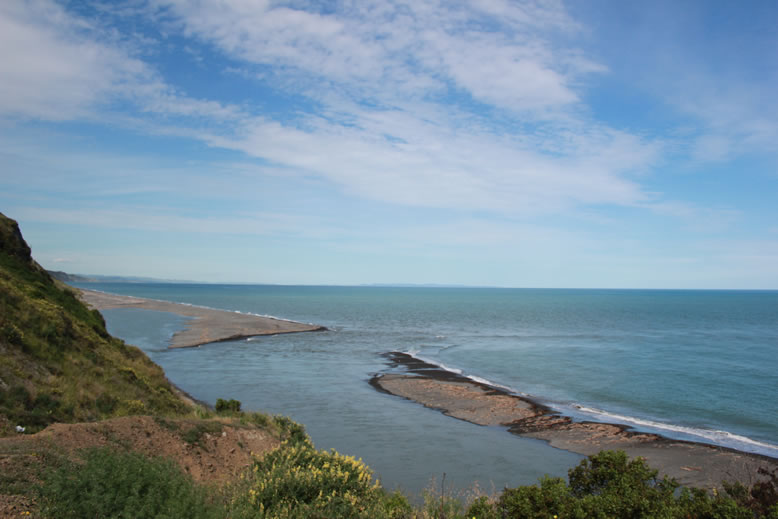
Where the Mōhaka meets the ocean

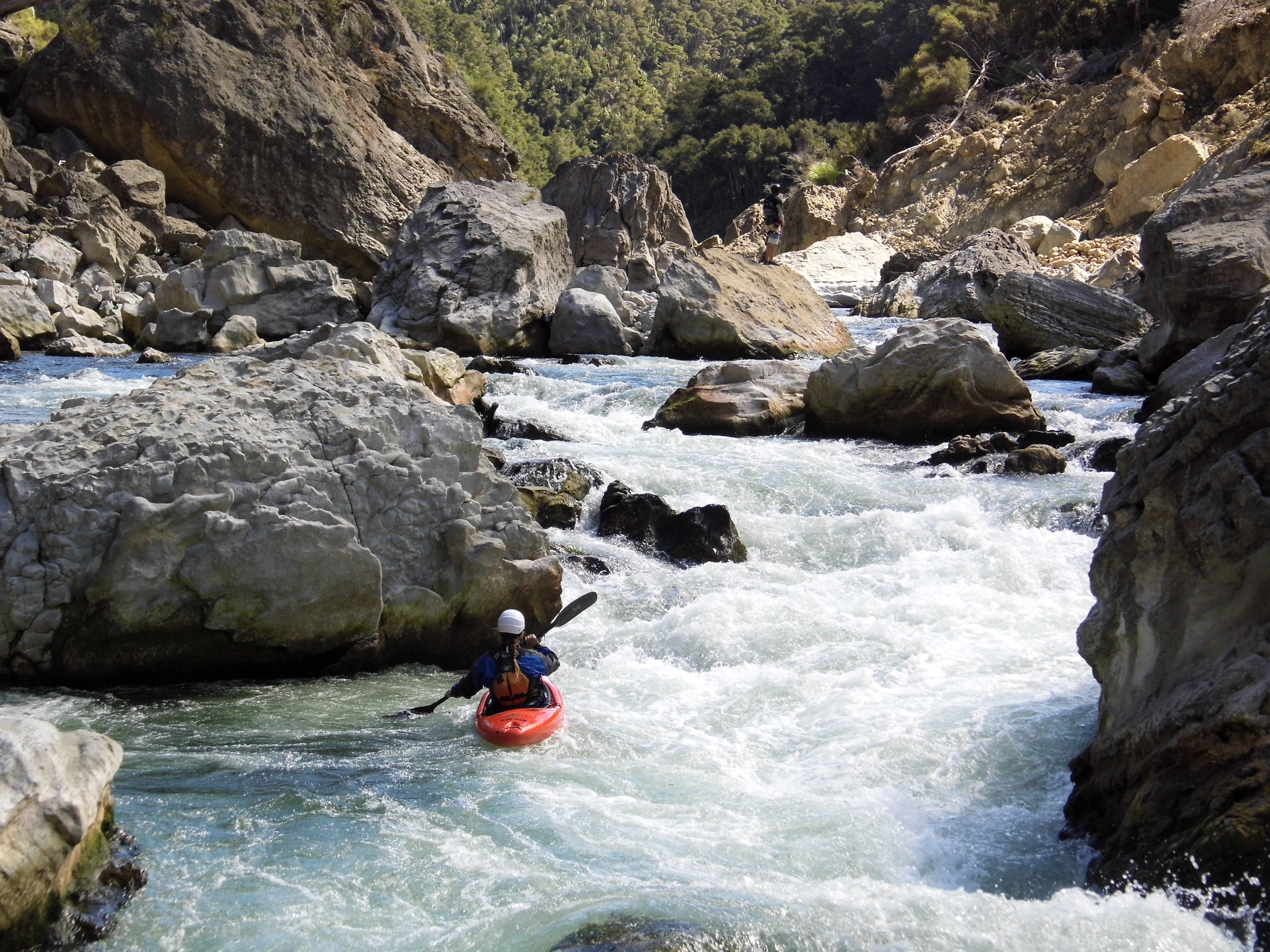
Kayaking on the Grade 5 section

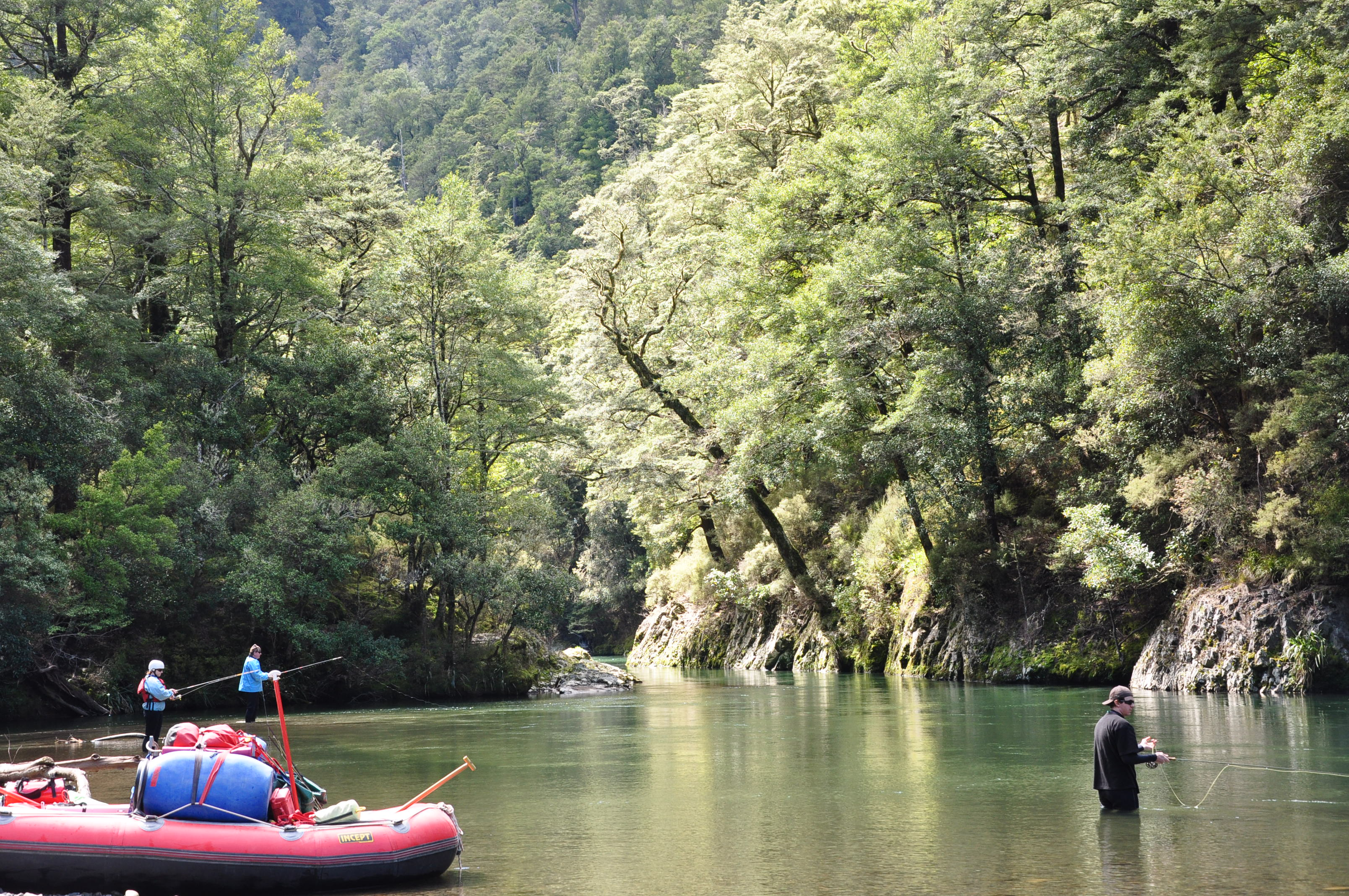
Fishing between the rapids of the Upper Section
