= Climate Liberation Aotearoa =

Climate action group in New Zealand

Climate Liberation Aotearoa's logo

Climate Liberation Aotearoa, formerly known as Restore Passenger Rail (RPR), is a direct action climate group that does illegal protests, and are a part of the "A22 Network", a global network of groups and campaigns seeking to combat climate change and ecological collapse. During the 2020s, the group attracted media attention in New Zealand for protest activities and blocked people from moving freely around including blocking traffic, disrupting local council meetings, and protesting cruise ships.

== Ideology and goals ==
The group's former logo until 2024, when it was known as Restore Passenger Rail

Climate Liberation Aotearoa is an environmentalist group in New Zealand that seeks to combat climate change by breaking the law an transforming society through illegal acts According to spokesperson James Cockle, a key priority of the group is decarbonising transport.

In its earlier incarnation as Restore Passenger Rail (RPR), the group advocated making public transportation free as a means of reducing pollution, congestion and combating climate change. Restore Passenger Rail pursued a strategy of civil resistance including blocking roads. According to The Spinoff editor Toby Manhire, RPR was inspired by Extinction Rebellion and is a member of the A22 Network, an international group of "connected projects engaged in a mad dash to try and save humanity." The group's two key demands in 2023 were the restoration of a nationwide passenger rail system connecting Northland and Invercargill, and making public transportation free.

By 2024, the group had rebranded itself as Climate Liberation Aotearoa, reflecting its pivot from advocating for passenger rail to opposing cruise ships, regarding them as worse polluters than planes. The group also stated that it would focus on combating transport emissions and pollution, particularly cruise ships. Their four main priorities are: travel less, travel active, travel public and then travel electric.

== Leadership and strategies ==
Climate Liberation Aotearoa's spokesperson is James Cockle, who unsuccessfully challenged James Shaw's co-leadership of the Green Party of Aotearoa New Zealand in 2021. In 2023, Rosemary Penwarden served as the spokesperson of the group when it was known as Restore Passenger Rail. According to The Spinoff, RPR organised several civil resistance recruitment sessions to block roads and other transport arteries. By April 2024, their target had shifted from lobbying central government to changing local councils' emissions policy, which Cockle attributed to the change in government that occurred following the 2023 New Zealand general election.

== History and activities ==
=== 2022 launch ===
The climate action group first emerged as Restore Passenger Rail (RPR) in 2022. On 16 September 2022, Stuff reported that the group had emerged six weeks ago, attracting dozens of members in over five cities and hundreds of social media followers. According to RPR spokespeople Michael Apáthy and Lauren Dance, the group wanted the Government to restore passenger rail to 2000 levels and work with mana whenua to create several networks of passenger lines connecting New Zealand's urban centres. If the Government did not meet RPR's deadline, Apáthy warned that RPR would adopt non-violent civil resistance to promote their cause.

On 10 October 2022, Restore Passenger Rail obstructed traffic on State Highway 1 by climbing a gantry near Wellington's Bolton Street. RPR spokesperson James Cockle said that the protest was intended to highlight the need for a better passenger rail network in light of the climate emergency. Cockle added that the group had warned the Government that they would commence civil resistance if they did not agree to restore passenger rail. On 12 October, six RPR activists blocked the southbound lane of Wellington's Terrace Motorway Tunnel, causing traffic to back up to Ngauranga Gorge, before being detained by Police. On 14 October, Restore Passenger Rail campaigners disrupted traffic on State Highway 2 near Melling railway station before being removed by Police.

On 18 October, two Restore Passenger Rail campaigners disrupted traffic at the Mount Victoria Tunnel by abseiling down the tunnel's Hataitai side. On 19 October, about 12 RPR campaigners blocked traffic on the Transmission Gully Motorway's southbound lane by gluing themselves to the tarmac. Police arrested the protesters for disrupting traffic. On 27 October, Restore Passenger Rail campaigners occupied the State Highway 1 gantry near Bolton Street a second time. Police arrested three campaigners for disrupting traffic. Though the group had intended to speak at Parliament's Transport and Infrastructure Select Committee via Zoom from the gantry, the committee refused to hear from the activists while they were obstructing traffic. Transport Minister Michael Wood ruled out meeting with the RPR campaigners, stating that "people who thought the way of making progress was to make threats and disrupt thousands of people would not be invited to a meeting to have good faith dialogue."

In December 2022, Transport Minister Wood met with Restore Passenger Rail activists including spokesperson James Cockle. According to Cockle, Wood told them that the Labour Government did not have enough money to fund passenger rail, and that it was not on his top ten list of climate action priorities. RPR regarded the meeting as a failure and vandalised the Wellington electorate offices of Wood, Finance Minister Grant Robertson, Member of Parliament Ibrahim Omer, Associate Finance Minister Megan Woods, Minister for Consumer Affairs David Clark and the Dunedin electorate office National Party MP Michael Woodhouse with fake blood. National MP Simeon Brown criticised Wood for meeting with Restore Passenger Rail, whom he regarded as extremists similar to the British Just Stop Oil protesters blocking motorways. Following the vandalism of MPs' offices, Wood ruled out further meetings with the group, stating that "crossing the line of vandalism, criminal behaviour and widespread public disruption is totally unacceptable." Cockle vowed that the group would continue pressing the Government to take action, stating that "your inaction is leading to death around the world, blood is on your hands."

=== 2023 ===
On 17 April 2023, four Restore Passenger Rail activists were arrested by Police for blocking traffic at Wellington's Terrace Tunnel. The group's spokesperson James Cockle confirmed that the group was back after a four-month hiatus, stating "The flooding in Auckland, Cyclone Gabrielle, tornadoes now...we are desperate, we can see the effects of climate change and things are only getting worse." On 20 April, Police arrested four RPR activists who had glued themselves to Wellington's Adelaide Road during peak traffic. Following the Adelaide Road protest, Mayor of Wellington Tory Whanau ruled out meeting the group, saying "They have not moved forward in good faith, they have disrupted Wellingtonians, they have disrupted the lives of normal people instead of the Government's." The Adelaide Road protest marked RPR's second protest during the week and ended with the arrest of five members on charges of endangering traffic and breaching court bail. On 3 May, Police arrested three RPR protesters for disruipting traffic on Glenmore Street in Wellington's Karori suburb.

On 22 August, Restore Passenger Rail issued a press release entitled "Four Lanes to Climate Hell" vowing to disrupt Wellington traffic in support of their campaign for restoring passenger rail. On 29 August, three RPR protesters including retired scientist Rosemary Penwarden blocked traffic on State Highway 1 in Wellington during peak traffic hour. Police arrested the trio including Penwarden, who was denied bail and remanded into custody on a charge of endangering transportation. On 31 August, RPR protesters blocked the southbound lane of State Highway 1 near Wellington's Bolton Street.

On 4 September, Restore Passenger Rail campaigners blocked the north side of Wellington's Terrace Tunnel. Three protesters were arrested by Police. On 14 September, three RPR protesters were arrested for vandalising the facade of Gazley Motor Group in Wellington's Cambridge Terrace. The protesters claimed that luxury utility vehicles and SUVs were "killing" the environment.

On 13 November, Restore Passenger Rail protesters staged a slow march in Auckland's Queen Street, causing bus detours and disrupting traffic. They wore high-visibility orange vests and held up banners saying "Restore Passenger Rail, protest climate, save lives" and "Free urban transport".

On 6 December, a Restore Passenger Rail activist vandalised the windows of two car yards on Auckland's Great North Road owned by the Giltrap Group to protest against the pollution caused by luxury cars. RPR spokesperson Joseph J. Fullerton denounced luxury cars as "symbols of greed and climate change." On 7 December, Restore Passenger Rail activists led by Jonty Coulson called for climate action during an Auckland Council meeting. Auckland councillor Chris Darby spoke in support of the protesters. On 8 December, 20 RPR marched through Auckland's Great South Road towards Newmarket to protest against the National-led coalition government's policies, which they claimed would worsen climate change, natural disasters and pollution.

On 12 December, The New Zealand Herald reported that members of Restore Passenger Rail were arrested for their involved in the defacement of the Treaty of Waitangi exhibit at Wellington's Te Papa Museum on 11 December. A total of 12 protesters were arrested by Police in relation to that incident.

=== 2024 ===
On 8 January, the Advertising Standards Authority ordered Restore Passenger Rail to remove an offensive advertisement which contained an expletive. The offending advertisement read "So now we're f***ed," with the letter "n" replaced with the logo of the National Party. The advertisement was intended to encourage people to join the group.

By 27 February, the group had revamped itself as "Climate Liberation Aotearoa" (CLA). Spokesperson James Cockle said that decarbonising transportation would remain the group's key priority and that they would target the cruise ship industry and participate in council meetings.

On 20 March, Climate Liberation Aotearoa activists urged the Christchurch City Council to include cruise ship emissions within its climate emissions reduction target. On 9 April, 20 CLA protesters marched through Wellington Central to protest against the cruise ship industry.

On 16 April, RPR activist Thomas Brown was discharged without conviction after pleading guilty to a charge of criminal nuisance for his role in disrupting traffic on Wellington's Bolton Street in August 2023. As part of the discharge without conviction, Brown agreed to pay over NZ$2600 in reparations for the operation needed to remove him from the gantry.

In mid-April 2024, Climate Liberation Aotearoa protested in Auckland's Princes Wharf during a visit by the cruise ship Majestic Princess. Protesters including Cockle held protest signs and distributed pamphlets on the environmental impact of cruise ships. Other CLA activists paddled in front of the Majestic Princess during its visit to Dunedin and blocked trams carrying cruise ship visitors in Christchurch.

In early October 2024, CLA protesters staged a road blockade on a flooded highway during the 2024 Otago floods to raise awareness of climate change and rising water levels.

In mid October 2024, Climate Liberation Aotearoa activists followed the Princess Cruises cruise ship Diamond Ship during its visits to Auckland, Wellington, Lyttelton and Dunedin. In mid November 2024, 12 CLA protesters met with passengers from the cruise ship Celebrity Edge during its visit to Port Chalmers.

=== 2025 ===
In mid-April 2025, 70 Climate Liberation Aotearoa activists established an encampment on the Denniston Plateau in the West Coast Region to protest against mining company Bathurst Resources's fast-track application to extend its Stockton mine. Several activists climbed onto cable cars used to transport coal at the Stockton mine. In response, Bathurst Resources issued trespass notices against the protesters and contacted law enforcement. On 22 April, Police issued trespass notices against seven protesters, with one being arrested and six others receiving court summonses. By 23 April, most of the protesters had dispersed. Police arrested three more protesters. Bathurst Resources resumed operations at the Stockton mine.

Between late July and mid August 2025, two CLA activists Rach Andrews and Tāmati Taptiklis staged a three-week sit-in protest in a coal bucket at Bathurst Resources's Stockton mine. The two activists were calling on the company to withdraw a fast-track application to extend its mining operations in the Stockton and Denniston Plateau. Andrews and Taptiklis came down after three weeks, and were charged by Police with trespass and lawful conversion. Their protest forced Bathurst Resources to use trucks to transport coal from the mine at a cost of NZ$27,000 a day.

On 8 August, Climate Liberation Aotearoa staged protests at several ANZ Bank New Zealand branches across the country including Central Dunedin to protest the bank's investments in fossil fuel industries such as coal.
