= Hutt Expressway =

Road in New Zealand

State Highway 2
- River Road, Western Hutt Road, Hutt Road

Route information
- Maintained by NZ Transport Agency Waka Kotahi
- Length: 30 km (19 mi)
- Component highways: State Highway 2

Major junctions
- Northeast end: Maoribank
- Junction 962; State Highway 58; Exit 979; State Highway 1
- Southwest end: Ngauranga; Ngauranga Interchange

Location
- Country: New Zealand
- Primary destinations: Upper Hutt, Stokes Valley, Avalon, Lower Hutt City Centre, Petone

Highway system
- New Zealand state highways; Motorways and expressways; List

The Hutt Expressway (often erroneously referred to as the Hutt Motorway) is a 3-4 lane divided highway running from the Wellington Urban Motorway at Ngauranga, past Lower Hutt and central Upper Hutt, to the intersection with Fergusson Drive in Maoribank in north-eastern Upper Hutt. State Highway 2 officially continues north of Maoribank to Te Mārua, Kaitoke, and over the Rimutaka Hill to Wairarapa, but this section is two lanes undivided and is covered in the main State Highway 2 article. The names Hutt Expressway and Hutt Motorway are not official, and actually refers to three different roads: Hutt Road from the Ngauranga Interchange to the Petone Overbridge, Western Hutt Road from the Petone Overbridge to the Silverstream Bridge, and River Road from Silverstream Bridge to Maoribank.

== Design ==
South of the Silverstream Bridge intersection the road is mainly two lanes each way, with a three-lane northbound section just south of the Belmont Hills intersection, and is dual carriageway throughout. North of the Silverstream Bridge intersection, the road is dual carriageway as far as Gibbons Street, except for a small section on the Moonshine Bridge across the Hutt River, with the Gibbons Street to Maoribank section being single carriageway. Except for the Moonshine Bridge and Totara Park to Maoribank section, the road has three lanes in total: two in one direction and one in the other, alternating every kilometre (a 2+1 road)

== Improvements ==
The section between the Petone and Normandale Overbridges was improved by the Dowse to Petone project, replacing three sets of traffic lights with a grade-separated roundabout and an overbridge.

The grade-separation of the SH 58 intersection at Haywards was opened in 2017, converting the traffic light controlled intersection with a grade separated roundabout interchange. There are proposals to replace the Melling intersection with a grade-separated interchange also. Future plans also exist to grade separate the intersections at Fairway Drive (Kennedy Good Bridge) and at Silverstream (Fergusson Drive).

== Interchanges ==
All interchanges are at-grade unless otherwise specified. At-grade intersections are controlled by traffic lights, with minor ones controlled by Give Way and Stop signs. Several minor intersections were changed to prevent traffic turning right into or out of minor roads. The Haywards (SH 58), Dowse Drive, Petone, and Ngauranga interchanges are grade-separated.

Territorial authority	Location	km (Note: Distances are measured from the start of State Highway 2 near Pōkeno)	Destinations	Notes
Upper Hutt City	Maoribank	949.7	SH 2 Fergusson Drive (north) – Te Mārua, Masterton; Fergusson Drive (south) – Mangaroa, Upper Hutt City Centre	River Road begins
Upper Hutt City		950.9	Totara Park Road (east); Totara Park Road (west) – Totara Park	
Upper Hutt City		952.3	Gibbons Street – Upper Hutt City Centre	Traffic light controlled seagull intersection
Upper Hutt City		953.9	Whakataki Street – Wallaceville, Whitemans Valley	
Upper Hutt City		954.7	Moonshine Road – Trentham, Heretaunga	Southbound exit and entrance
Upper Hutt City		954.9	Moonshine Bridge over Hutt River	
Upper Hutt City		955.5	Moonshine Hill Road – Riverstone Terraces	
Upper Hutt City	Silverstream	959.1	Fergusson Drive – Silverstream, Stokes Valley	Silverstream interchange – Traffic light controlled seagull intersection River Road ends; Western Hutt Road begins
Hutt City	Manor Park	961.5	SH 58 (Manor Park Road / Haywards Hill Road) – Manor Park, Pāuatahanui, Porirua	Haywards interchange – grade-separated roundabout interchange
Hutt City		964.9	Hebden Crescent/Liverton Road	
Hutt City		965.7	Hebden Crescent/Gurney Road	Northbound exit and entrance
Hutt City	Belmont	966.4	Carter Street – Belmont Domain	
Hutt City	Belmont	966.9	Fairway Drive – Avalon, Naenae, Hutt Hospital	Kennedy Good interchange – traffic light controlled staggered-T intersections
Hutt City	Belmont	967.0	Major Drive – Kelson	Kennedy Good interchange – traffic light controlled staggered-T intersections
Hutt City		967.8	Grounsell Crescent – Belmont Hills	
Hutt City		968.4	Wairere Road/Pomare Road	Northbound exit and entrance
Hutt City	Melling	969.3	Block Road (east) – Normandale; Tirohanga Road (west) – Tirohanga	Melling Interchange – Twin traffic light-controlled four-way intersections; proposed interchange to start construction at end of 2022
Hutt City	Melling	969.4	Melling Link (east) – Lower Hutt City Centre, Waterloo; Harbour View Road (west) – Harbour View	Melling Interchange – Twin traffic light-controlled four-way intersections; proposed interchange to start construction at end of 2022
Hutt City		971.7	Dowse Drive – Maungaraki, Petone, Lower Hutt City Centre	Dowse Interchange – grade-separated roundabout interchange
Hutt City	Korokoro	973.2	Petone	Southbound exit only
Hutt City	Korokoro	973.4	Priests Avenue – Petone, Korokoro	Northbound exit and entrance
Hutt City	Korokoro	974.1	Hutt Road –Petone, Eastbourne, Wainuiomata	Petone Interchange – Northbound exit and southbound entrance Western Hutt Road ends
Hutt City	Wellington City	974.7	Horokiwi Road – Horokiwi	Northbound only. Southbound entrance closed in 2010.
	Wellington City	976.1	BP Hutt Road	Northbound only
Ngauranga	Wellington City	978.4	SH 1 Hutt Road – Ngauranga, Porirua, Picton Ferry	Ngauranga Interchange – Southbound exit and northbound entrance.
Ngauranga	Wellington City	979.0	SH 1 Wellington Urban Motorway – Wellington City Centre, Airport	State Highway 2 ends

== See also ==
- List of motorways and expressways in New Zealand
