= Inner City Bypass =

Inner City Bypass may refer to:

- Inner City Bypass, Brisbane, road in Australia
- Newcastle Inner City Bypass, road in Australia
- Wellington Inner City Bypass, road in New Zealand
