= Ngauranga Interchange =

Road junction in New Zealand

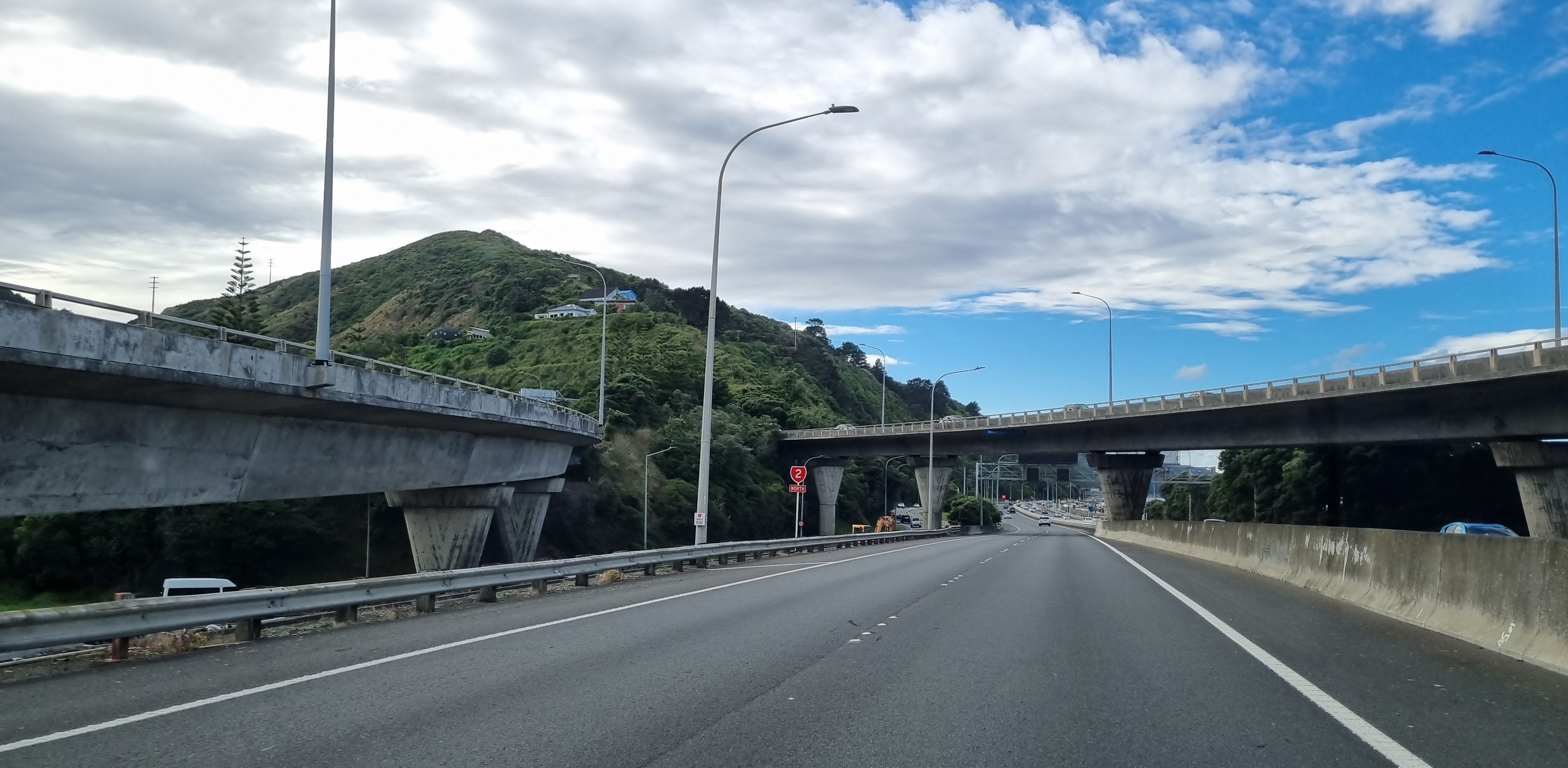
- Looking north at the junction of the motorway and SH2 (Hutt Road). Northbound overbridge at left, southbound overbridge at right.

Location
- Ngauranga, Wellington, New Zealand
- Coordinates: 41.247063°S 174.814517°E
- Roads at junction: SH 1 (Centennial Highway) SH 1 (Wellington Urban Motorway); SH 2 (Hutt Road) Hutt Road

Construction
- Type: Modified semi-directional T interchange
- Constructed: 1969, 1984
- Opened: 1984
- Maintained by: New Zealand Transport Agency

The Ngauranga Interchange at the foot of the Ngauranga Gorge is a major interchange in the suburb of Ngauranga, in Wellington, New Zealand. The Ngauranga Interchange connects State Highways 1 and 2 with each other and also to Hutt Road for access to the interisland ferry terminals and alternative access to central Wellington. The incremental launching method used for constructing the interchange was the first time this technique had been used in New Zealand.

The majority of traffic in and out of Wellington uses this interchange. It is the southern terminus of State Highway 2.

== Background ==
Before the construction of the Wellington Urban Motorway, the interchange comprised a single set of traffic lights between Hutt Road (SH2) and Centennial Drive (SH1).

On opening of the Wellington Urban Motorway in 1969, the interchange was modified to a fork. Traffic from SH2 could exit for Hutt Road and SH1, or could proceed straight for the motorway. At the traffic lights, vehicles from SH1 could turn right for Hutt Road and Wellington, or turn left for the SH2 towards the Hutt Valley. SH1 traffic could not access the new motorway.

The plan for the Wellington Urban Motorway intended that there would be a direct link between the motorway and SH1 in Ngauranga Gorge, but construction of the interchange was postponed until after the Terrace Tunnel was operational so that off-ramps at Aotea Quay and Hawkestone Street would not be overloaded. The Terrace Tunnel opened in May 1978, and the National Roads Board approved financing to build the interchange in December 1979.

Fletcher Development and Construction was awarded the contract to build foundations which included a temporary diversion road. Some existing services including water mains and telephone cables had to be relocated.

In November 1981 Mainzeal Construction was awarded the contract to build both the north and southbound lanes.

== Design ==
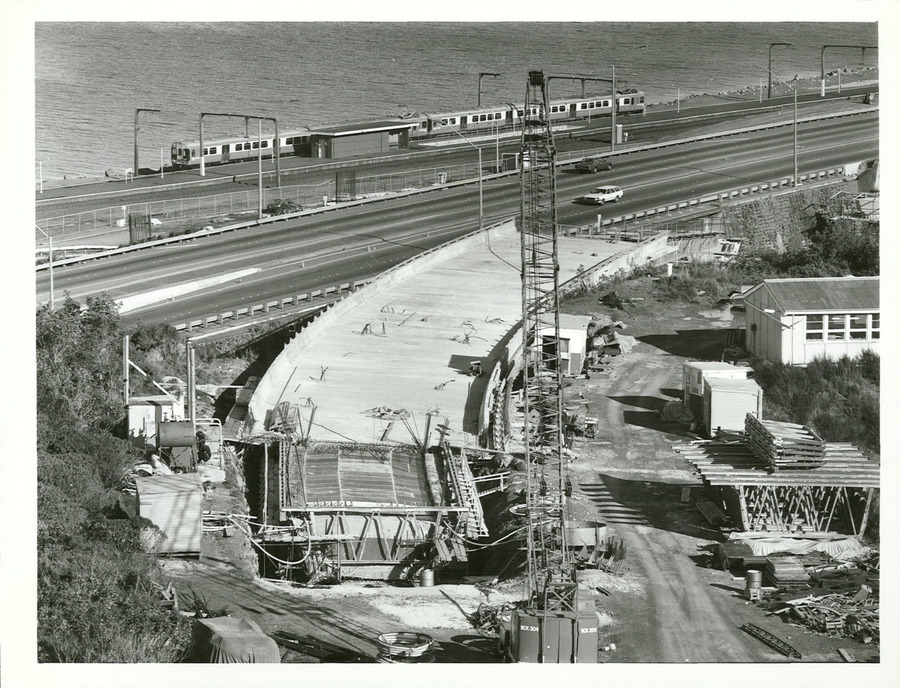
Northbound overbridge under construction, June 1983. Launch nose visible at right at the end of the concrete sections.

The interchange was designed by the Ministry of Works and Development. Design considerations at the site were that the bridges would cross the Wellington Fault, there was little clearance with the existing Hutt Road and motorway and it was not possible to close such important roads for a long period of time. Since the site was close to the sea, steel was not considered suitable. The interchange consists of two curving two-lane roads. The northbound road is 1.2 km long and incorporates an overbridge over the Hutt Road. The southbound road is 1.5 km long with an overbridge over the Hutt Road and a reinforced earth wall which connects the southbound lanes with the Wellington Urban Motorway. Both roads cross an overpass above Ngauranga Gorge Road.

=== Overbridges ===
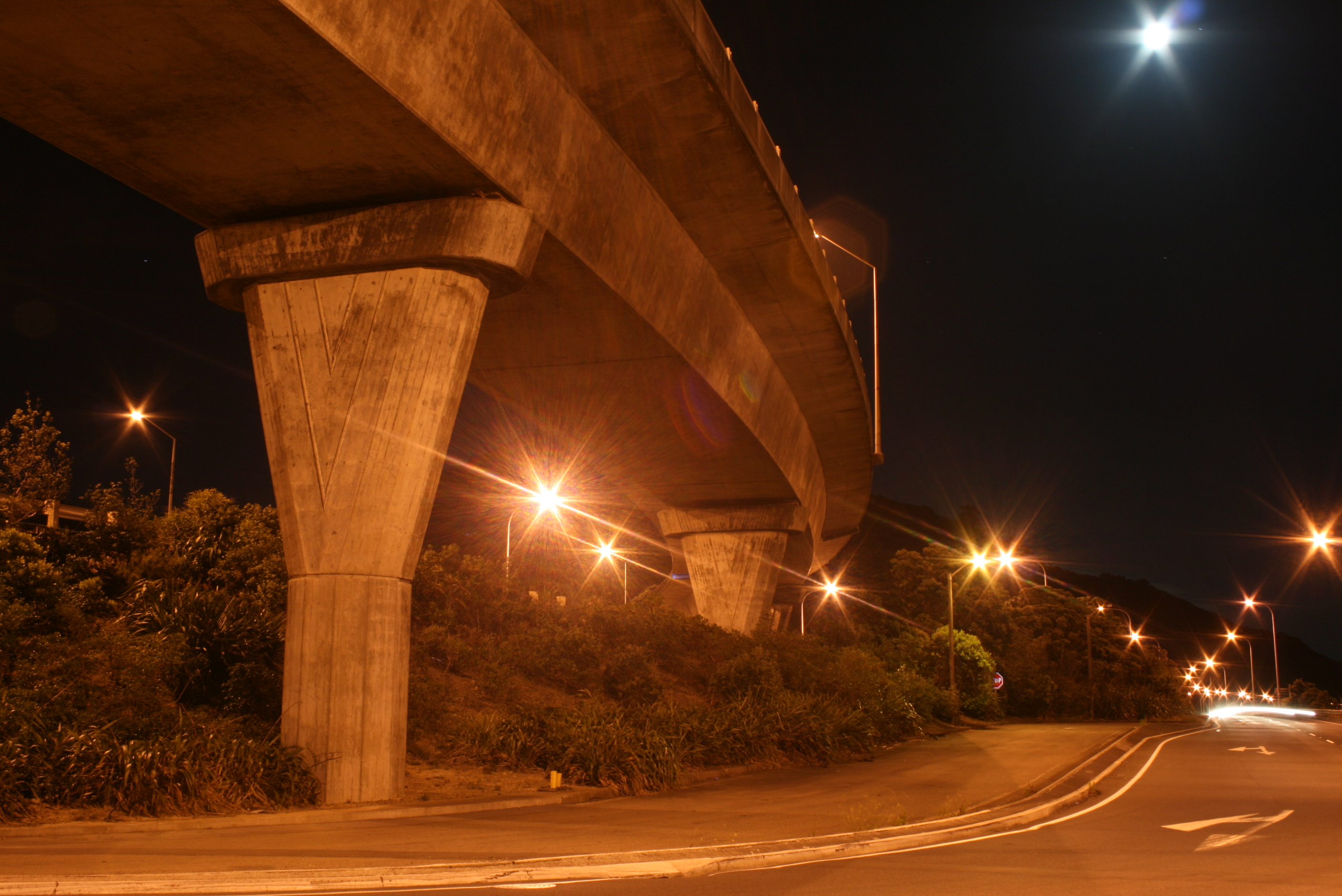
Overbridge at the Ngauranga Interchange

The overbridges over the Hutt Road are made of box sections of prestressed concrete with identical cross sections and horizontal curvature. It was decided to build the bridges in concrete for incremental launching, the first time the procedure had been used in New Zealand. Box sections of concrete were made behind one of the bridge abutments, and as each section was completed it was pushed out over the edge using hydraulic jacks, with the next section then cast behind it. A temporary steel girder or 'launch nose' was fixed in front of the first section to reach to the next pier. The northbound overbridge is 151 m long and the southbound one is 212 m, but since the bridges have the same cross section and curvature, the same equipment was able to be used for both bridges. The northbound bridge has eight 20 m box section units and the southbound bridge has eleven.

=== Ngauranga Gorge overpass ===
The overpass is 80 m long and 30 m wide, with two lanes in each direction. It consists of two unequal spans constructed of reinforced concrete supported on reinforced concrete columns on top of the foundations built by Fletchers. The overpass was built in two stages, with a diversion road, to lessen traffic delays.

=== Earth wall ===
A reinforced earth wall supports a ramp that connects the southbound overbridge to the existing motorway lanes. Concrete facing panels are bolted to metal strips up to 12 m long embedded in the earth fill. The wall is over 170 m long and ranges from 6 to 13 m high, and when completed was the largest wall of its type in New Zealand.
