= Wellington Urban Motorway =

Road in New Zealand

Wellington Urban Motorway
- State Highway 1
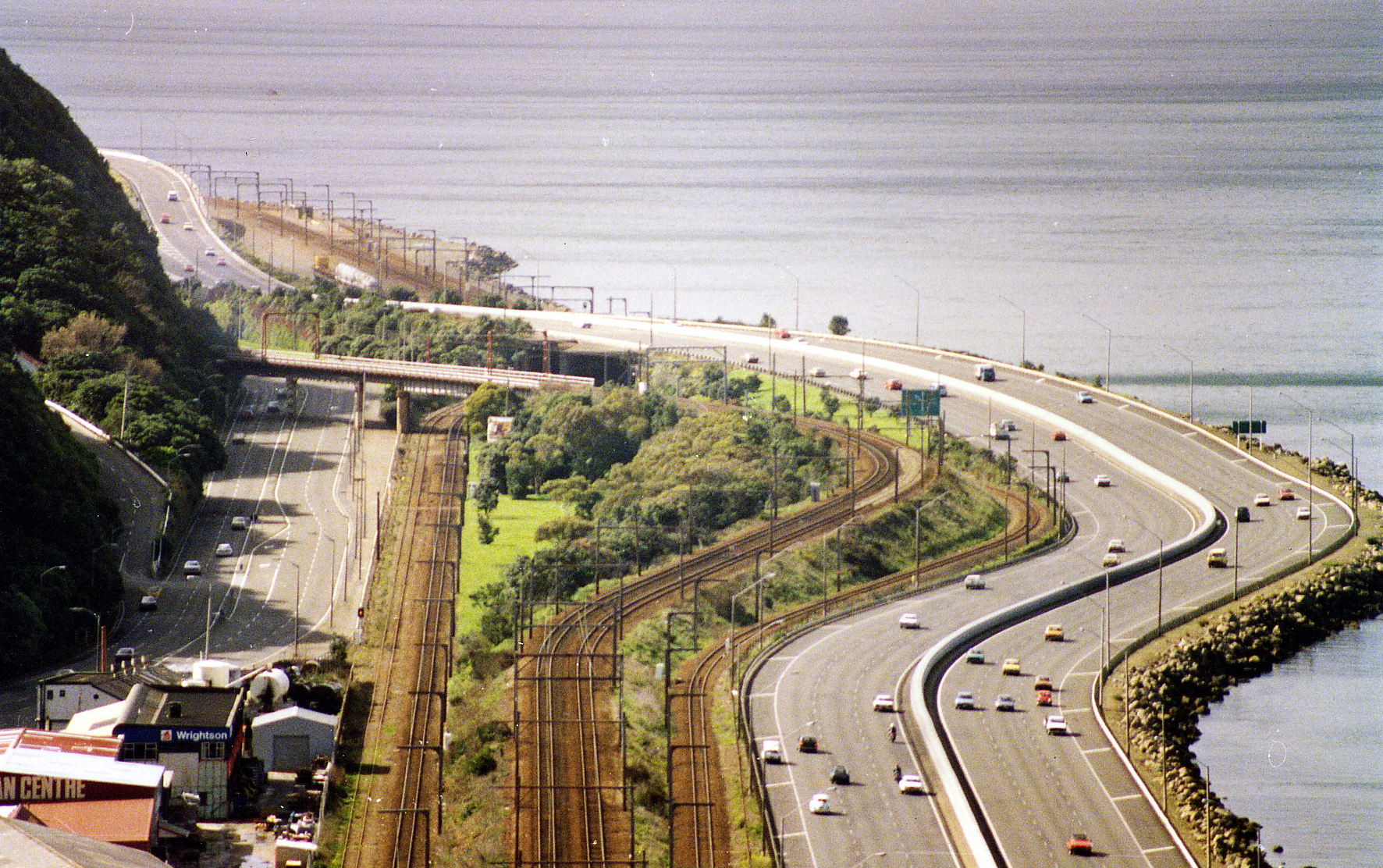
- The Wellington Urban Motorway in 1994, looking north out of Wellington. The motorway shares a narrow stretch of reclaimed land with the Hutt Road, the North Island Main Trunk railway and the Wairarapa Line.

Route information
- Maintained by NZ Transport Agency Waka Kotahi
- Length: 7 km (4.3 mi)
- Existed: 1968–present
- History: Completed in 2007

Major junctions
- North end: Ngauranga; Ngauranga Interchange
- Exit 1068; Ngauranga Interchange; State Highway 2
- South end: Te Aro; Karo Drive (northbound) and Vivian Street (southbound)

Location
- Country: New Zealand
- Primary destinations: Ngauranga, Kaiwharawhara, Thorndon, Kelburn, Te Aro, Wellington CBD, Waterfront

Highway system
- New Zealand state highways; Motorways and expressways; List

The Wellington Urban Motorway, part of State HIghway 1, is the main road into and out of Wellington, New Zealand. It is 7 km long, ranges from three to seven lanes wide, and extends from the base of the Ngauranga Gorge into the Wellington CBD.

From the Ngauranga Interchange (State Highways 1 & 2), the motorway travels south across reclaimed land alongside the Wairarapa and North Island Main Trunk railway lines. After passing through the suburb of Kaiwharawhara, the motorway travels across the 1335m long Thorndon overbridges, the longest bridges in the North Island, before entering the suburb of Thorndon. Shortly after, it enters the Terrace Tunnel before terminating at Vivian Street in central Wellington.

== Design ==
Following the Second World War the population of the Hutt Valley and Porirua basin increased, leading to growing congestion on the Hutt Road into Wellington and in the city itself. In the 1950s the National Roads Board, an arm of the Ministry of Works, began the search for better road access into the heart of Wellington. In 1955, Wellington City Council's City Engineer proposed that an elevated expressway be built along the waterfront, but this was deemed too expensive. Construction of a motorway between Ngauranga and Aotea Quay began in 1959 with earthmoving works and reclamation. Also in 1959, the Ministry of Works put a proposal to Wellington City Council for a motorway through the city along the western foothills, and plans were submitted to the National Roads Board in June 1960. U.S. consultants De Leuw Cather were engaged late in 1960 to design a motorway scheme and advise on traffic improvements within the city. De Leuw Cather's report was released in August 1963. It assumed that the Ngauranga – Thorndon motorway that was already under construction would be completed, and proposed to connect to it with either a 'waterfront' motorway along Aotea Quay, Waterloo Quay and Jervois Quay to Kent Terrace, or a 'foothill' motorway crossing Thorndon and the city to the Basin Reserve and Mt Victoria Tunnel. The foothill motorway was De Leuw Cather's preferred option, in line with the council's previously stated preference.

The alignment and scale of the motorway between Ngauranga and the Bowen Street overbridge as built very closely matches the original 'foothill' proposal, with the exception that the proposed interchange at Ngaio Gorge (with on- and off-ramps over the railway to Kaiwharawhara) was never completed, although the stumps of a southbound on-ramp and northbound on- and off-ramps remain visible today broadly parallel to Kaiwharawhara railway station. Beyond the Tinakori Road on-ramp and Hawkestone Street off-ramp going south, the motorway is a considerably scaled down concept from what was initially proposed, and it was never extended as far as the Basin Reserve.

== 1959–1968: Ngauranga to Aotea Quay ==
The first phase of the motorway was a 2.7 miles (4.3 km) section between Ngauranga and Aotea Quay which began with reclamation works in 1959 and opened in April 1968 as part of State Highway 2. This relieved the chronic congestion at the traffic signal controlled intersections at the bottom of Ngauranga Gorge and Ngaio Gorge where long delays and peak time queues of several kilometres occurred during the morning and evening peaks. This section included several traffic overbridges, a rail access tunnel for the Gear Meat Company and the Ngauranga Railway Bridge.

== 1969–1978: Aotea Quay to Vivian Street ==
The motorway was extended in phases: to Murphy Street in 1969, May Street in 1970 and to the Hawkestone Street off-ramp in 1972. Hundreds of old houses in Thorndon, including one of Katherine Mansfield's family homes, were demolished to make way for the motorway, with no assistance given to displaced tenants and homeowners. Public protest over the destruction of the suburb eventually led to Thorndon becoming New Zealand’s first built heritage conservation area. Other protestors questioned the need for a motorway at all.

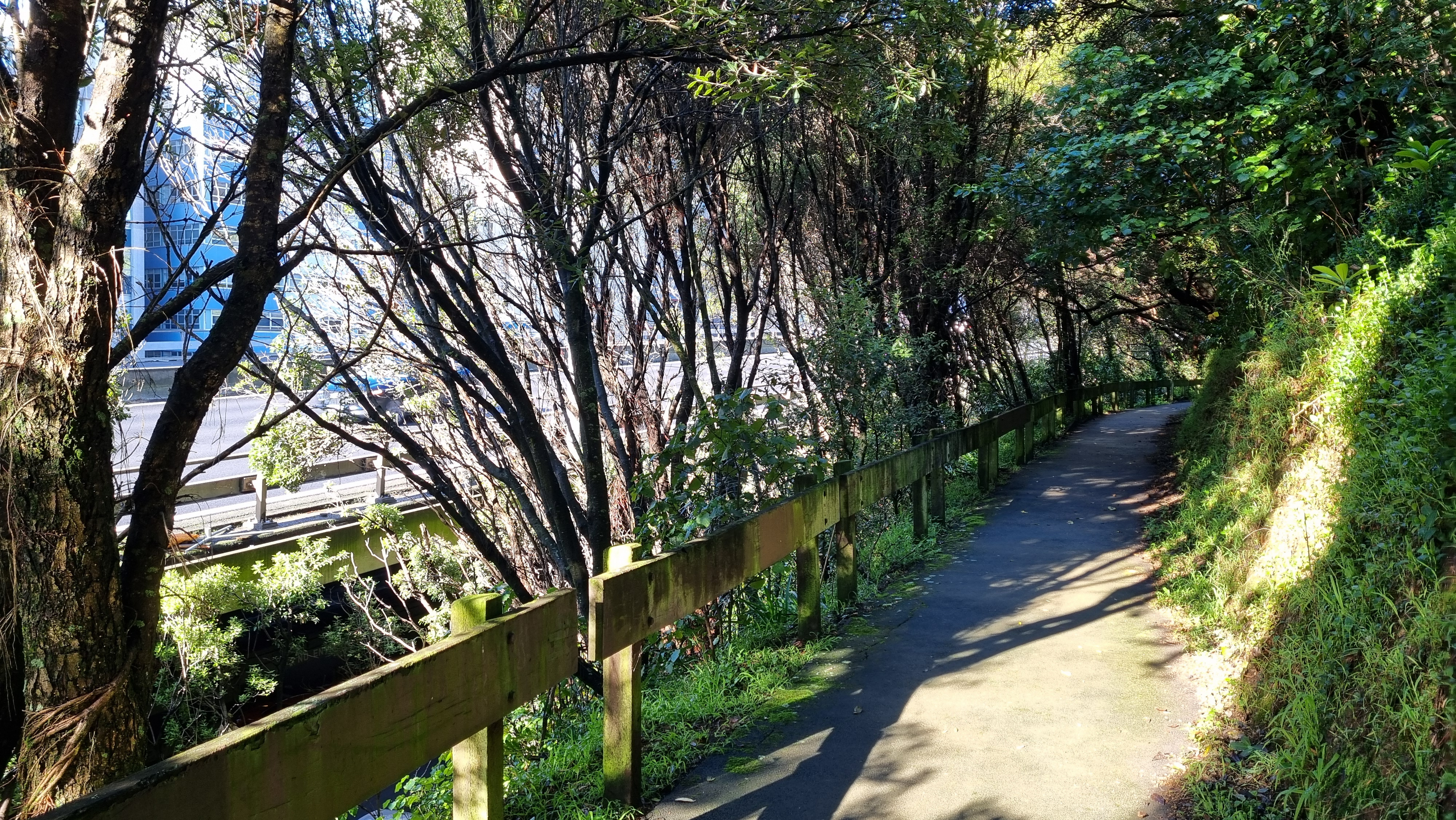
Tokyo Lane walkway along the hillside adjacent to the motorway

Walkways were built along each side of the Shell Gully area of the motorway. In 1972, the Ministry of Works won an environmental award presented by the New Zealand Institution of Engineers for the motorway's design, consideration of environmental factors, and landscaping and gardens alongside the motorway. A plaque celebrating the award was affixed to the slope of the Molesworth Street Bridge.

The last major extension was completed in 1978, with the construction of the Terrace Tunnel and the termination of the motorway at the Ghuznee and Vivian Street intersections with Willis Street.

The motorway was officially opened on 31 May 1978 by Prime Minister Robert Muldoon. Between Ngauranga and Vivian Street, the motorway had five on-ramps, five off-ramps, 11 bridges crossing over it and six bridges underneath it. The cost to that date was $68.9 million.

The overbridge passing above Thorndon Quay

=== Thorndon Overbridge ===
The Thorndon Overbridge is a 1.3 km-long overbridge consisting of two three-lane structures with an 8 feet (2.4 m) gap between them (covered by a grille for use as an emergency median). It stretches from the Kaiwharawhara Stream to past Thorndon Quay. The overbridge was built in three stages between 1967 and 1972 on land reclaimed at various periods during the 20th century. When it was built, the overbridge was described as "the largest pre-stressed concrete structure of its type in New Zealand". The overbridge passes over the Cook Strait ferry terminal and rail yards, and it crosses over the Wellington Fault. In 1996, earthquake-strengthening work was done on the overbridge. Part of the work involved wrapping 81 of the overbridge's 125 columns with layers of a fibreglass kevlar material, filled with epoxy, so that they are less likely to fail in an earthquake.

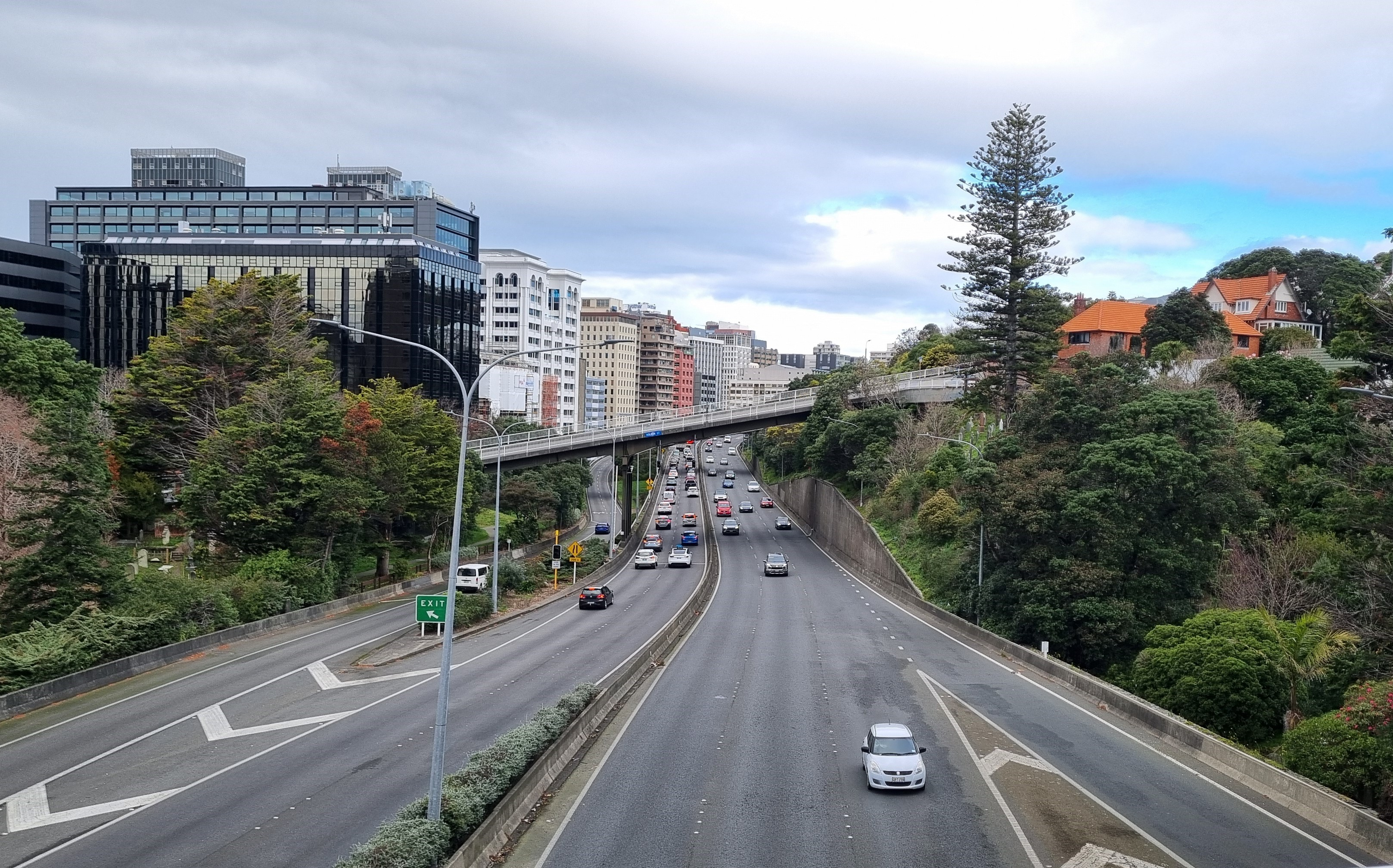
Looking south from the Denis McGrath footbridge

=== Bolton Street cemetery ===
The motorway plan took it through the middle of the Bolton Street cemetery. The cemetery had long been closed to new interments, but had huge historical significance as the burial place of many early Wellington settlers, and there was controversy about disturbing the graves. Between 1968 and 1971 the cemetery was closed to public access while about 3700 burials in the way of the motorway were exhumed. Most of the remains were reinterred in a large vault underneath a memorial lawn at the cemetery, while others were reinterred at other cemeteries. Salvaged gravestones were shifted to other parts of the cemetery. A footbridge (the Denis McGrath Bridge, named for the deputy mayor) was built over the motorway to link the two now-separate halves of the cemetery.

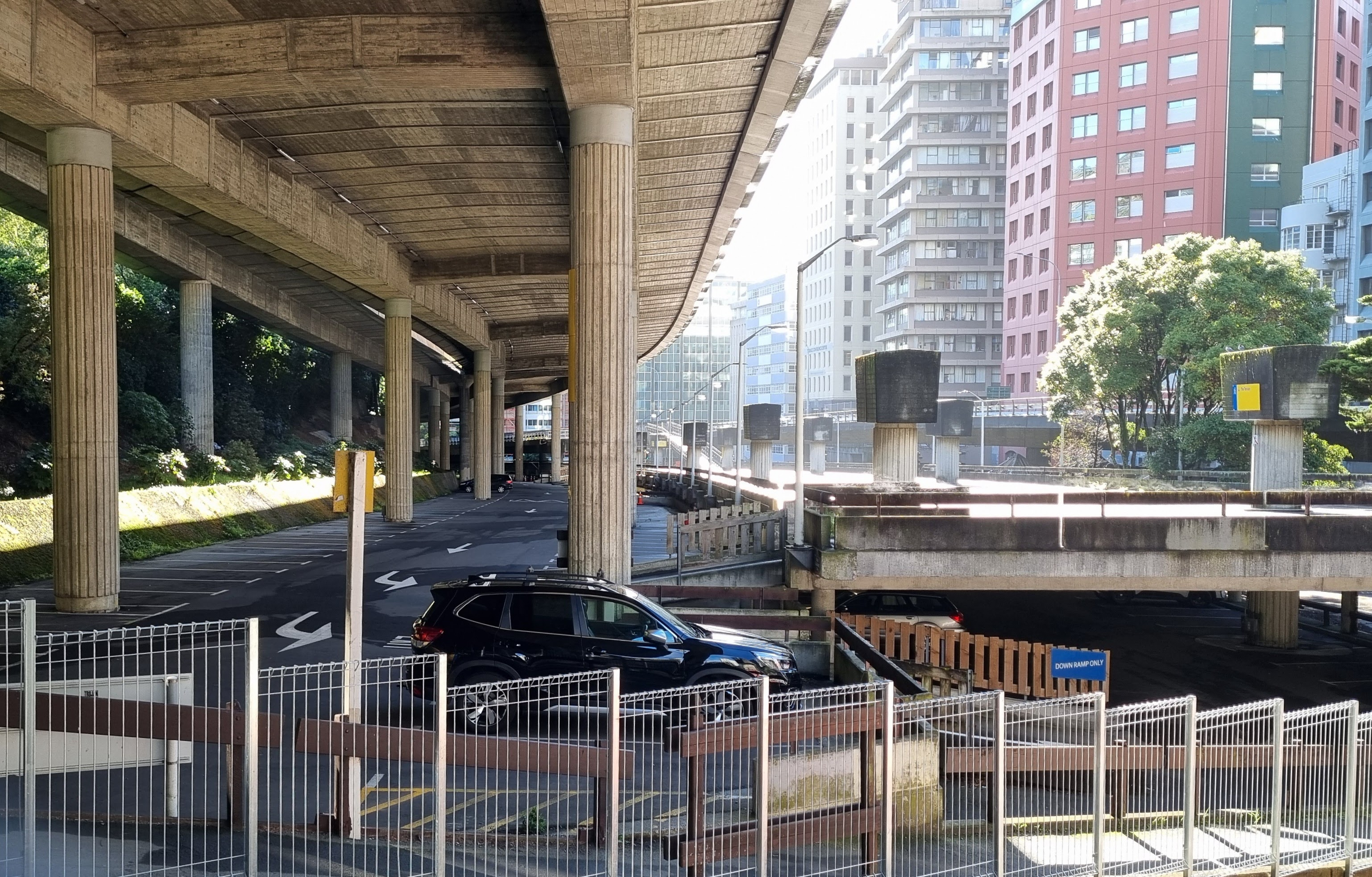
Clifton Terrace car park under the motorway, with incomplete lanes at right

=== Shell Gully ===
Shell Gully is an elevated stretch of the motorway extending from just south of Aurora Terrace to Boulcott Street, passing through a narrow gully between the Terrace and the hillside. Two carriageways were built at different levels and slightly overlapping to fit them into the narrow space in the gully. Short bridges pass over the motorway at Boulcott Street and Everton Street. There is an on-ramp at Clifton Terrace and an off-ramp to the Terrace. A two-storey public car park sits underneath the motorway in this area. Earthquake strengthening of this section of the motorway took place in 2003. Part of the motorway, which would have connected to a second Terrace Tunnel, was never built but the pillars remain in place.

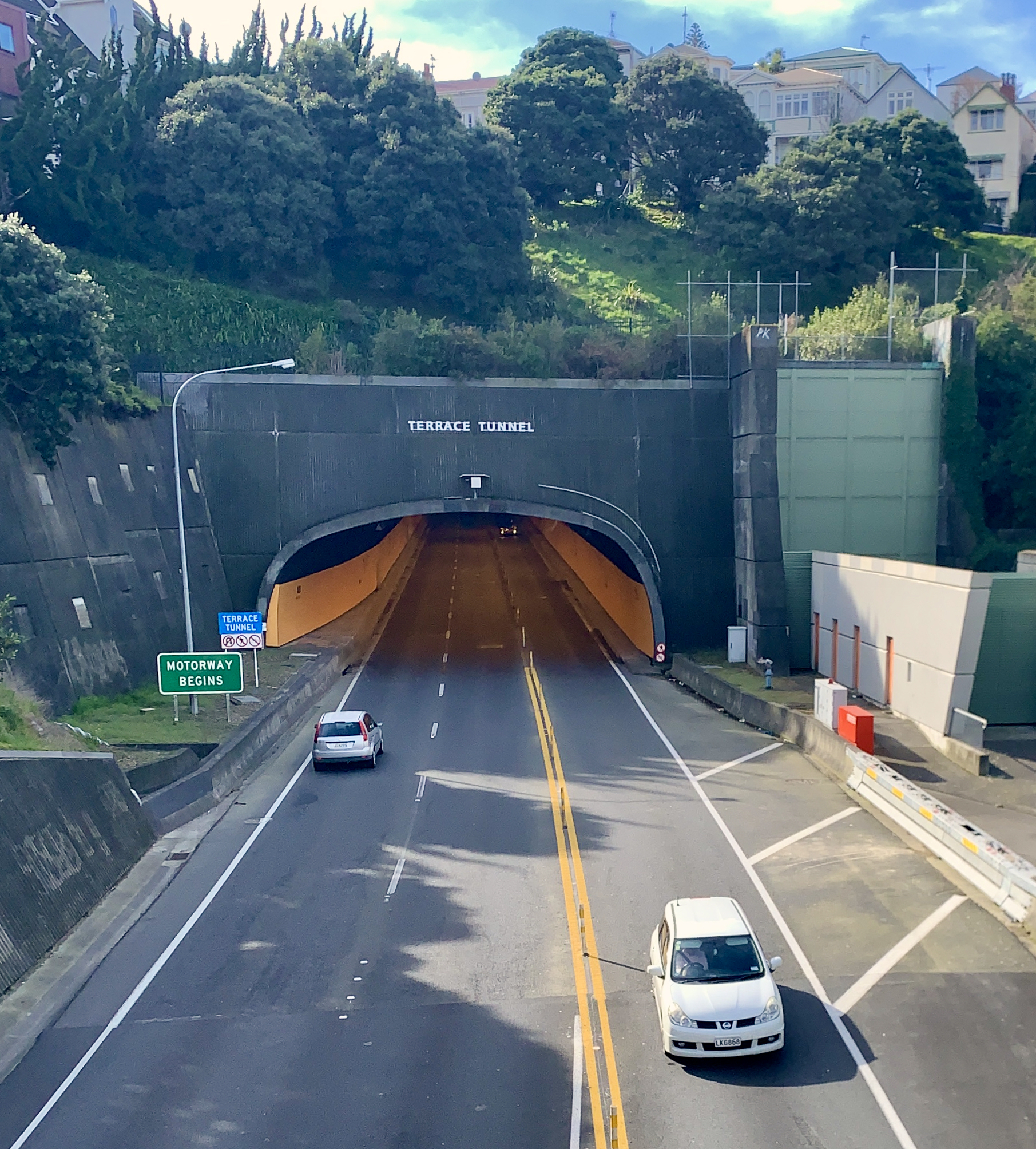
South entrance of Terrace Tunnel. The second tunnel would have been built to the right.

=== Terrace Tunnel ===
The Terrace Tunnel, opened in 1978, passes through the crush zone of an earthquake fault line, under a populated area. It was initially excavated as six small tunnels, and some areas were dug out by hand to minimise disturbance. The tunnel is 460 metres long with three traffic lanes. It was provided with mechanical ventilation and carbon monoxide detectors, and the lighting automatically adjusted according to the brightness of the day outside. Between 2010 and 2012, the tunnel was upgraded with new safety features including a deluge system for firefighting, improved ventilation, lighting, traffic management including detection of over-height vehicles, and earthquake-safety improvements. In 2024, LED lighting was installed.

== Second tunnel ==
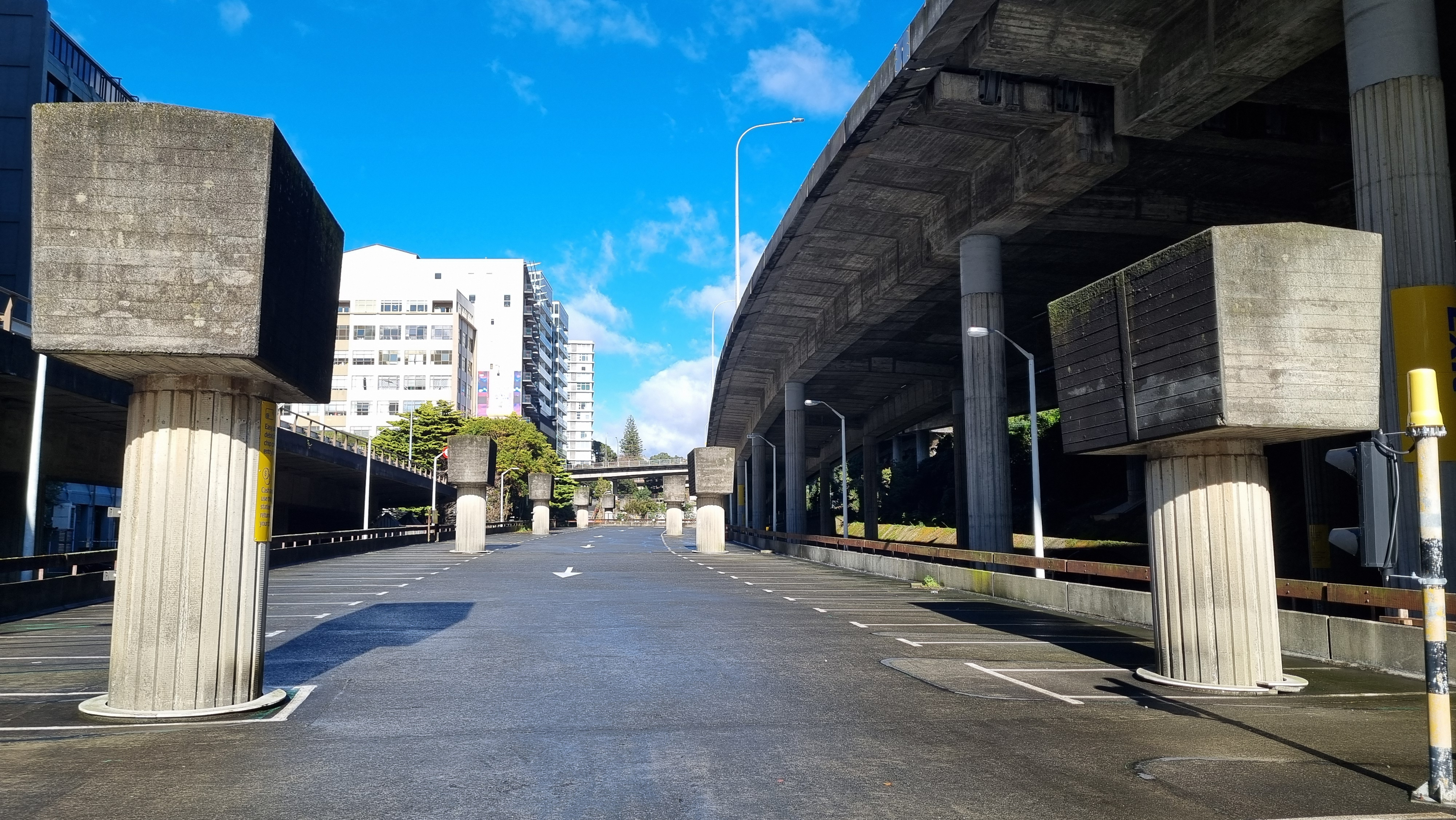
Clifton Terrace car park: pillars still exist for lanes that were never built.

The original concept was for six lanes to proceed to Willis Street, with the existing three-lane Terrace Tunnel being the northbound route with a duplicate southbound tunnel. The current alignment of the motorway up to the Terrace off-ramp clearly shows how six lanes were curtailed to three, by using the Terrace interchange to lose a lane each way, and a third lane merging southbound towards the remaining tunnel. About half of the southbound carriageway has been built but is unpaved, including the Bowen Street on-ramp which is now a walkway. The Shell Gully/Clifton Tce carpark under the motorway, accessible from the Terrace, clearly shows the pillars, and part of the carriageway (now part of the carpark) that would have carried the additional three southbound lanes to the second Terrace Tunnel. The northbound carriageway is almost complete with one exception, the Bowen Street off-ramp which would have been a counter-clockwise loop splitting off from the Tinakori Road off-ramp. A section of the Tinakori Road off-ramp has a different type of barrier to the rest of the off-ramp, showing where it would have been.

Funding for the second tunnel was indefinitely shelved in the 1970s due to fiscal pressures on government, and the beginning of far greater scrutiny of the quality of highway expenditure. It was clear that until the Wellington Urban Motorway was connected to State Highway 1 at Ngauranga Gorge, a single Terrace Tunnel would be adequate for the traffic demands of the 1970s.

== Ngauranga Interchange ==
The Ngauranga Interchange connecting the motorway to State Highway 1 to the north opened in 1984, removing the State Highway designation from the Hutt Road south of Ngauranga, and making the Wellington Urban Motorway between Ngauranga and Aotea Quay both State Highway 1 and 2. While the Ngauranga Interchange relieved the severe congestion experienced at the traffic light controlled intersection at Ngauranga, it did double the usage of the rest of the motorway, generating peak-time congestion at the end of the motorway, and in the morning peaks with merging traffic from the Hutt.

== Extension past Willis Street ==
Meanwhile, the original plans to extend the motorway beyond Willis Street had been significantly reviewed, with a new plan for an "arterial extension" at a 70 km/h standard proposed along the motorway alignment towards the existing Mount Victoria Tunnel (the original full motorway plan had been scrapped, as it would have meant the destruction of the Basin Reserve, and an unaffordable duplicate Mount Victoria Tunnel). That plan was shelved in 1993 because of funding constraints. Transit New Zealand prioritised a three-stage approach to addressing the traffic issues between the Terrace Tunnel and the Mt Victoria Tunnel:

Stage 1. Conversion of Buckle St to one-way westbound, and Vivian St from Taranaki Street to Cambridge Terrace to one-way eastbound operation. This was seen as a short-term measure to prepare for Stage 2.

Stage 2. Widening of Arthur Street and extension towards Victoria and Willis St to a new on-ramp underneath Vivian St. Closure of the Vivian St on-ramp and construction of a new off-ramp at Vivian St. Vivian St would be converted to one-way eastbound operation between Willis St and Taranaki St. The Ghuznee St off-ramp would be closed and Ghuznee St reverted to two-way operation. Stage 2 was seen as a medium-term measure, providing sufficient relief for ten years before consideration of Stage 3.

Stage 3. Construction of an almost entirely cut-and-cover grade-separated arterial tunnel highway from the Terrace Tunnel to Mt Victoria Tunnel, resembling the 1980s "arterial extension" proposal. This was seen as the long-term proposal.

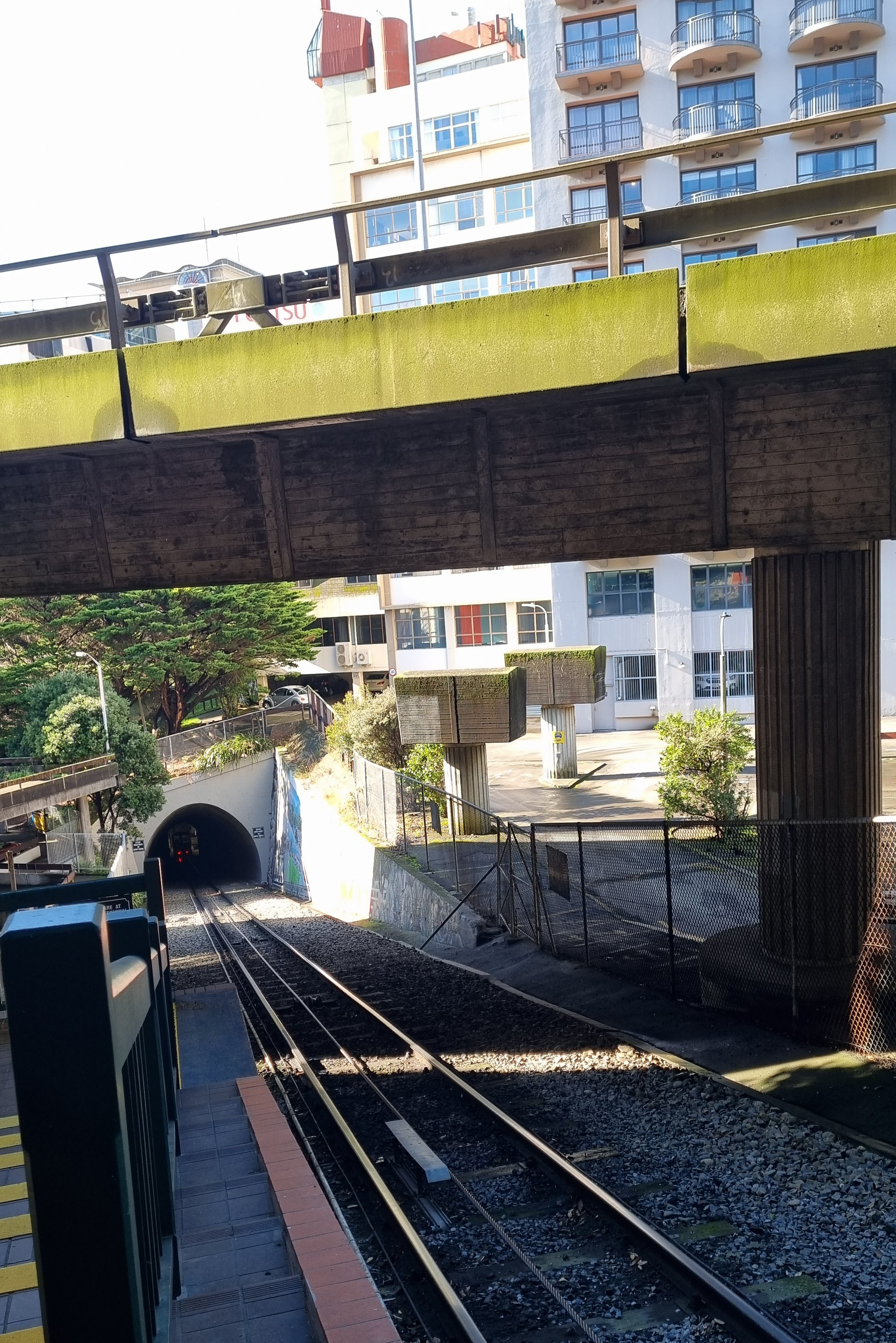
Motorway passing over the cable car lines at Clifton cable car stop

Between 1995 and 2002, Transit New Zealand pursued the Stage 2 proposal, which became known as the Wellington Inner City Bypass. Given the appeals and opposition to Stage 2 from some groups, Transit quietly shelved further work on Stage 3 as it focused on completing the one-way system across Te Aro.

== 21st century ==
Until 2006 the northbound motorway started at the Vivian Street on-ramp. On 28 December 2006 this on-ramp was closed, with a new northbound on-ramp created at Karo Drive as part of the Wellington Inner City Bypass.

Until 2007 the southbound motorway terminated at the Ghuznee Street off-ramp. On 25 March 2007 this off-ramp was closed, and traffic diverted to a new Vivian Street off-ramp along the line of the former on-ramp.

In 2016 the Wellington Urban Motorway, along with State Highway 1 to Johnsonville and State Highway 2 to Petone, became New Zealand's first 'smart motorway'. Speed limits are adjusted automatically according to the amount of traffic on the road, with the aim of smoothing out the flow of traffic. The project was budgeted at $55.8 million, but actually cost $88 million because design changes were made after the project was approved. Although the smart motorway technology was supposed to lessen congestion and create shorter, more reliable travel times, data released after the first year of operation showed that "peak-time northbound journeys between Hobson St and Petone had actually become longer, while southbound journeys had only improved by an average of about 30 seconds". NZTA's highway manager blamed poor driving behaviour for the lack of effectiveness of the new system.

The motorway is the subject of the ongoing Ngauranga to Airport Strategic Study, which is investigating Wellington's future transport growth needs.

== Interchanges ==
Territorial authority	Location	km	mi	Destinations	Notes
Wellington City	Ngauranga	1,068.0	663.6	SH 1 north (Centennial Highway) – Porirua, Palmerston North	Wellington Urban Motorway begins
Wellington City	Ngauranga	1,068.0	663.6	SH 2 (Hutt Road) – Hutt Valley, Masterton	Northbound exit and southbound entrance
Wellington City	Thorndon	1,070.9	665.4	Aotea Quay – Pipitea	Southbound exit and northbound entrance
Wellington City	Thorndon	1,071.8	666.0	Murphy Street – Thorndon	Southbound exit and northbound entrance
Wellington City	Thorndon	1,072.2	666.2	Hawkestone Street – Thorndon	Southbound only
Wellington City	Thorndon	1,072.5	666.4	Tinakori Road – Thorndon	Northbound only
Wellington City	Wellington Central	1,073.0	666.7	The Terrace – Wellington Central	Southbound exit and northbound entrance
Wellington City	Wellington	1,074.0	667.4	Terrace Motorway Tunnel	
Wellington City	Te Aro	1,075.0	668.0	SH 1 southbound (Vivian Street) – Airport, Seatoun; SH 1 northbound (Karo Drive)	Wellington Urban Motorway ends
1.000 mi = 1.609 km; 1.000 km = 0.621 mi

== See also ==
- List of motorways and expressways in New Zealand
