= Wellington Inner City Bypass =

Road in New Zealand

Coordinates: 41°17′53.4″S 174°46′36.28″E

Wellington Inner City Bypass
- State Highway 1
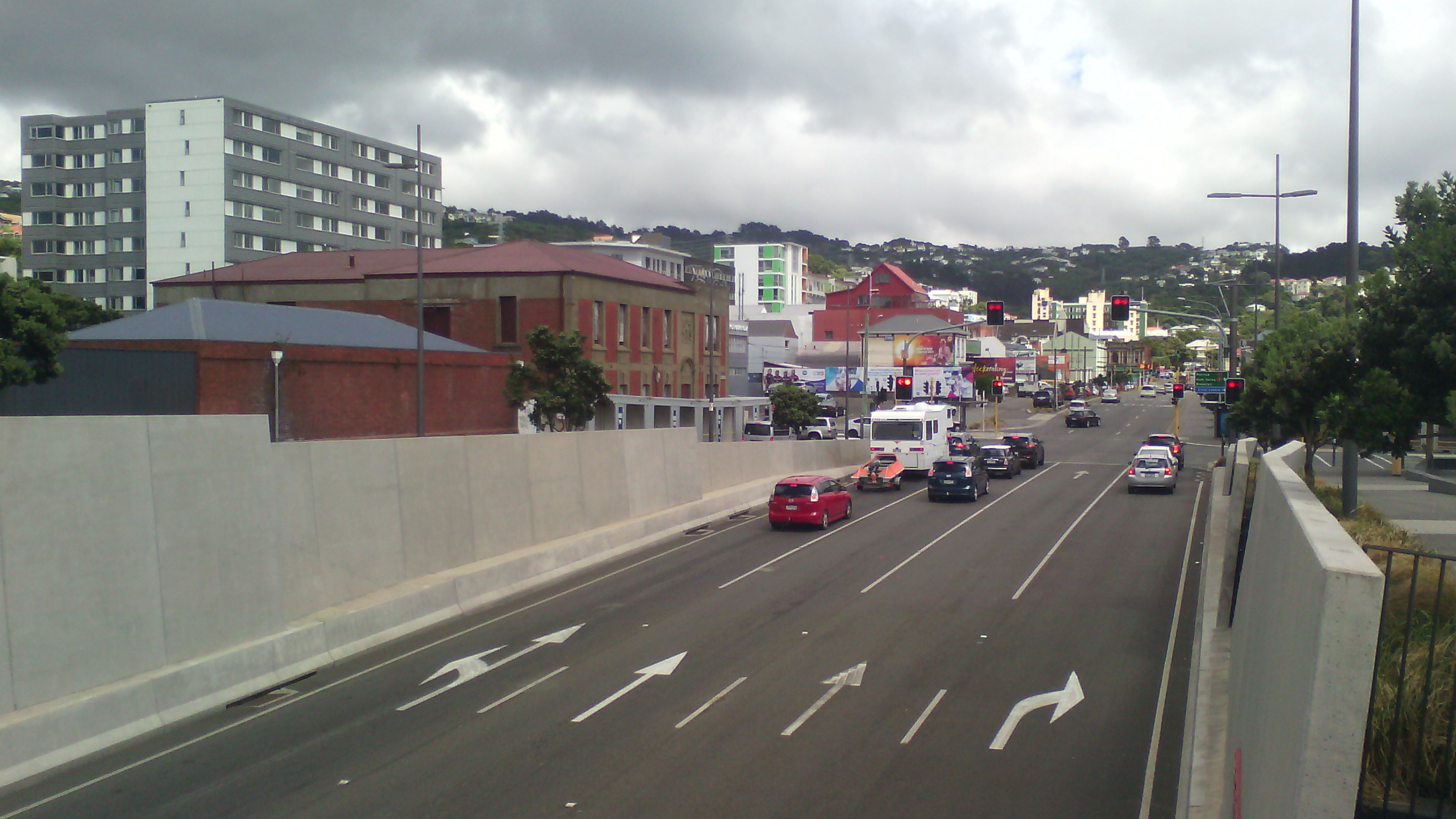
- A view north along the bypass from the Pukeahu National War Memorial Park

Route information
- Maintained by NZ Transport Agency Waka Kotahi
- Length: 1 km (0.62 mi)
- Existed: 2007–present
- History: Arras Tunnel completed in 2014

Major junctions
- North end: Willis Street; Wellington Urban Motorway
- South end: Basin Reserve; Sussex Street

Location
- Country: New Zealand
- Primary destinations: Mount Cook, Brooklyn, Te Aro, Wellington CBD

Highway system
- New Zealand state highways; Motorways and expressways; List

The Wellington Inner City Bypass is a westbound one-way road varying from two to four lanes largely at ground level in central Wellington, New Zealand, part of State Highway 1, and was fully opened in March 2007.

The bypass extends north-west from the Basin Reserve through the Te Aro area of inner Wellington along Karo Drive to the Terrace Tunnel where it joins onto the Wellington Urban Motorway.

== Original designs ==
A motorway bypass of the central city was proposed as early as 1963 in the De Leuw Cather Report, as an extension of the Wellington Urban Motorway (then known as the 'foothills motorway') in a trench along the approximate route of Karo Drive and Buckle Street, with overbridges at Cuba Street and Taranaki Street, and ending at a duplicated Mount Victoria Tunnel. Grade-separated intersections were to be provided at Taranaki Street, Tory Street, and the Basin Reserve. However, this proposal was shelved by the National Roads Board due to financial cutbacks in 1974.

A report published in 1980 proposed a scaled-down version of the foothills proposal, with an expressway trenched underneath Willis and Victoria Streets, cutting through Te Aro and severing Cuba Street. Due to the impact that this design would have had on the character of the city centre, it was not considered further. In 1994, the highway designation was extended from the Vivian Street and Ghuznee Street offramps to the airport, passing through the city centre through a one-way road system; this is the basic pattern that persists to this day.

== Controversy ==
The final design, as a ground-level road with traffic lights, resulted in complaints from pedestrian and cyclist traffic about crossing the bypass. Other objections related to the need to shift or demolish heritage buildings, and many expressed concern that the road would irreparably damage the Bohemian culture and community of the area. In September 2001, after the announcement by Transit New Zealand that construction would begin, hundreds of Wellingtonians marched through the city in protest.

Those in favour of the bypass generally described removal of traffic from the city centre as the main benefit.

== Construction and opening ==
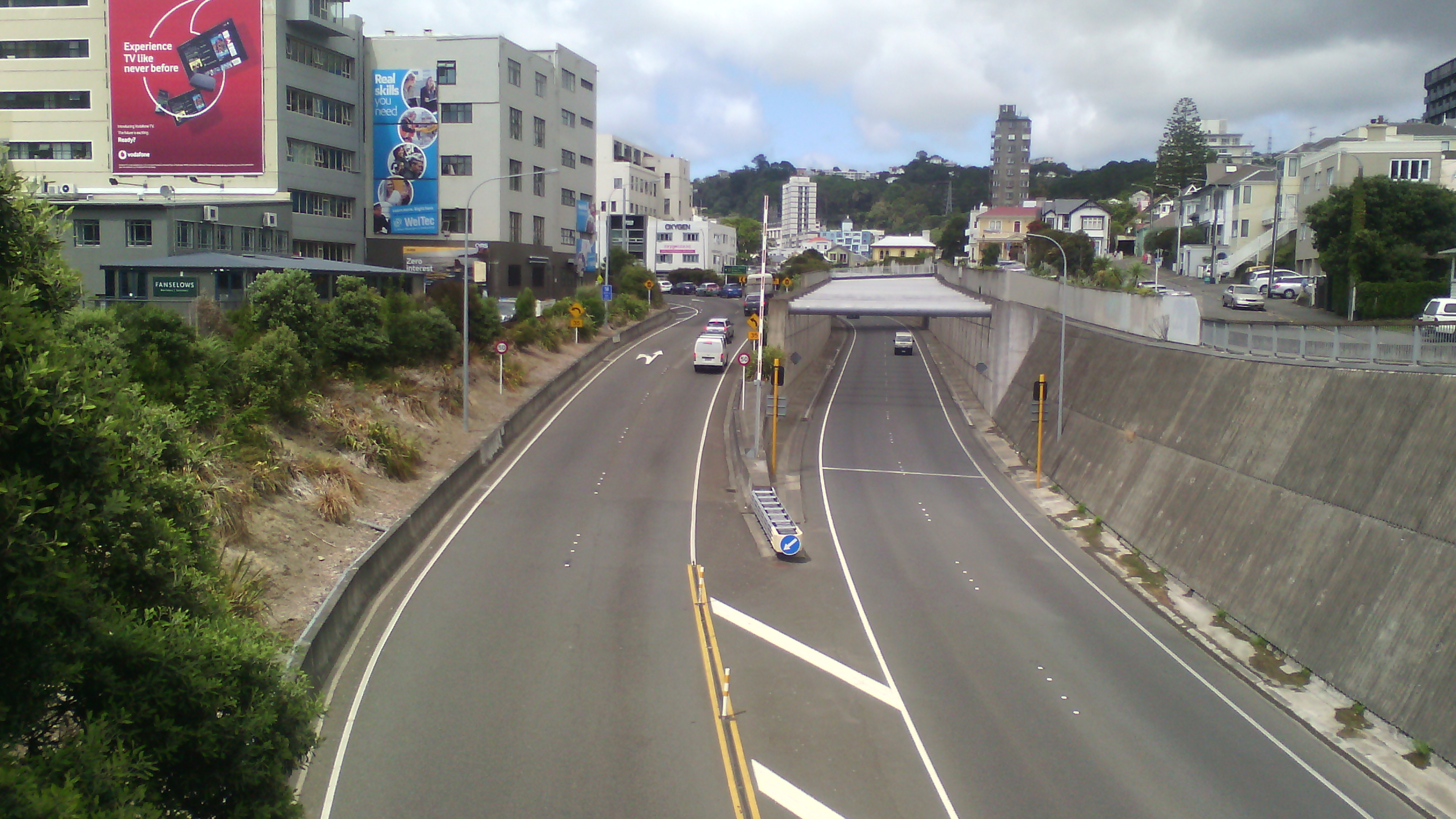
The trenched section of the bypass is on the right. The Vivian Street offramp on the left was the northbound motorway onramp prior to the opening of the bypass.

Construction of the bypass began in March 2005, with removal and movement of sixteen heritage buildings (including four heritage shops in upper Cuba Street).

In December 2006, the new northbound route of State Highway 1 along the new Karo Drive trench was opened, followed by the opening of the new Vivian Street offramp in March 2007. Prior to the opening, a 'Walk the Bypass' event was held that raised $5000 for the Karori Wildlife Sanctuary.

== Arras Tunnel ==
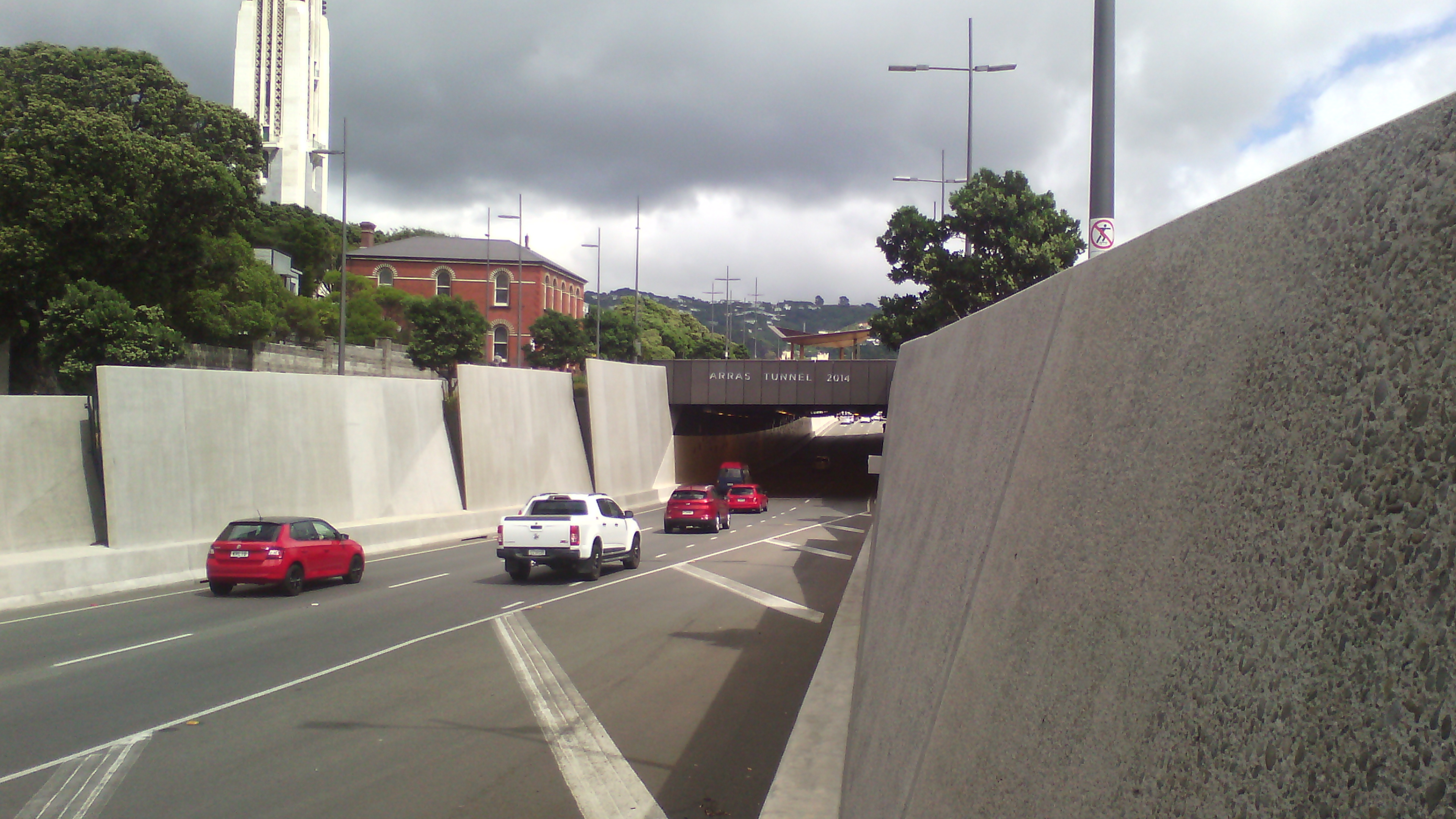
The Arras Tunnel viewed from the south.

In September 2014, the bypass was moved into the new cut-and-cover Arras Tunnel between the Basin Reserve and Taranaki Street, removing the Tory Street intersection. The name of the tunnel was chosen to honour the efforts of the New Zealand Tunnelling Company in the French town of Arras during the First World War. The tunnel walls are decorated with 273 decorative poppies as a further memorial. The space above the tunnel was used for the Pukeahu National War Memorial Park.

During construction of the tunnel, two still-in-use historic sewers (including a brick sewer over a century old) were protected from damage. In addition, the foundations of the nearby Mount Cook Police Barracks were protected by a 90 metre long wall of steel piles.
