= Ngauranga Gorge =

Coordinates: 41.238873°S 174.806291°E

Ngauranga Gorge
- State Highway 1
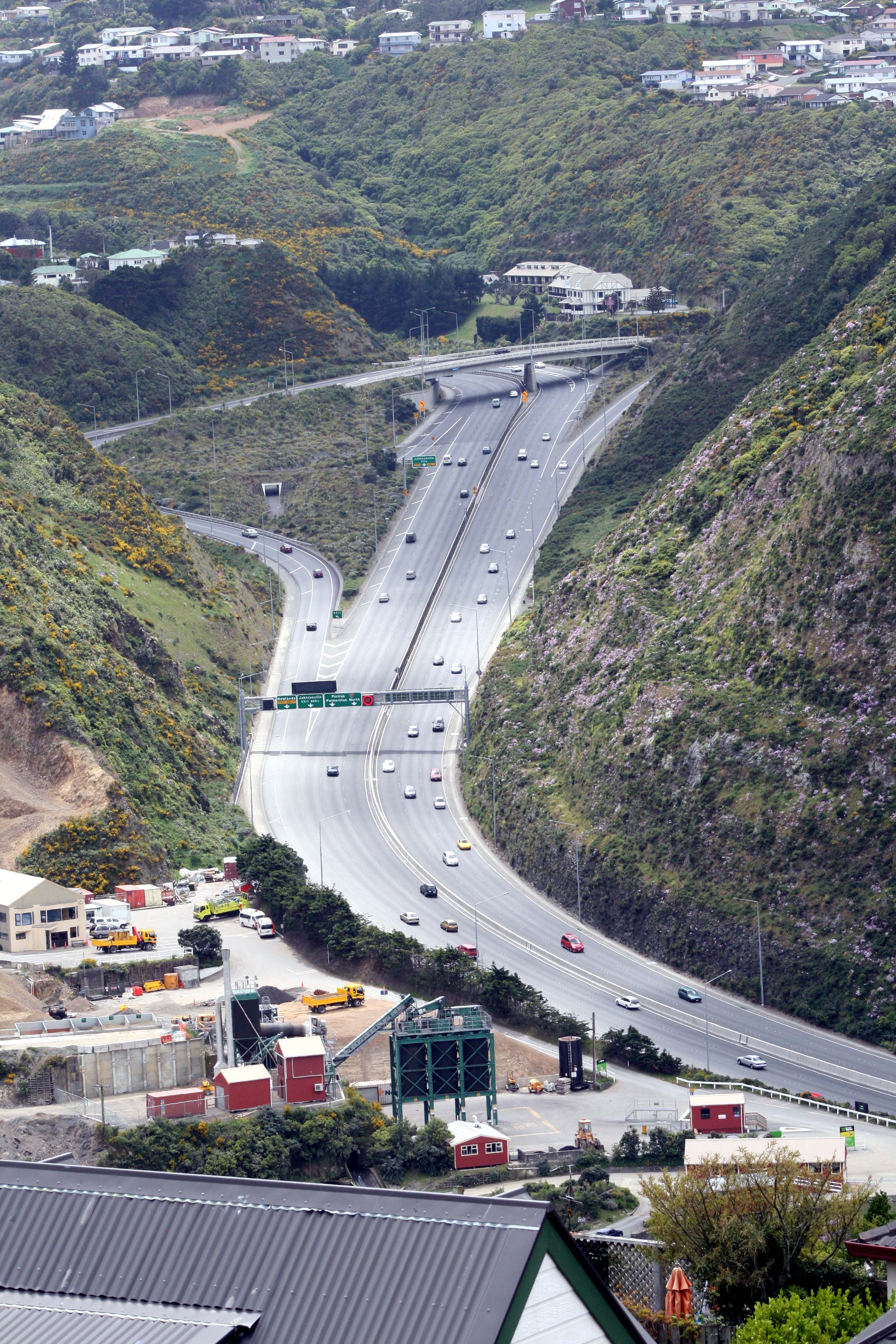
- Looking up Ngauranga Gorge from Rangoon Heights, with the Newlands Interchange crossing the motorway.

Route information
- Maintained by NZ Transport Agency Waka Kotahi
- Length: 2.8 km (1.7 mi)
- Existed: 4 November 1939–present

Major junctions
- North end: Johnsonville
- South end: Ngauranga

Location
- Country: New Zealand

Highway system
- New Zealand state highways; Motorways and expressways; List

The Ngauranga Gorge is in the Wellington Region of New Zealand. State Highway 1 runs through the gorge, a vital link between central Wellington City and its northern suburbs and Porirua City and the Kāpiti Coast; it is the main route north out of Wellington. It is 2 kilometres (1.2 mi) long and has a grade of approximately 8 percent. As of 2018, 74,000 vehicles per day travelled through the gorge, and it connects the Wellington Urban Motorway with the Johnsonville–Porirua Motorway.

The name is derived from the former Ngā Uranga pā at the foot of the gorge. Early records spell the name as Ngauranga or Ngahauranga.

== Formation ==
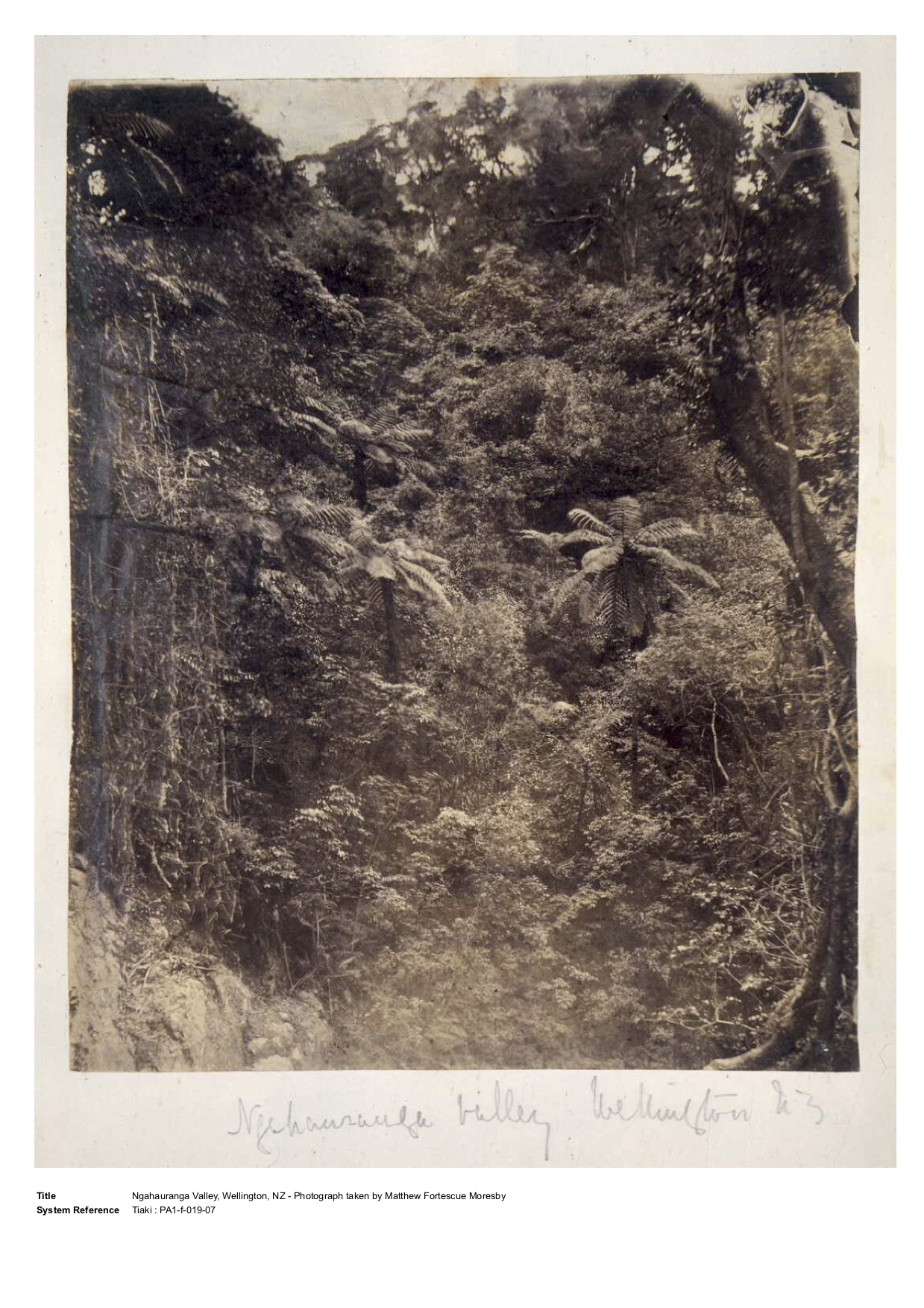
The undisturbed location photographed 22 March 1859

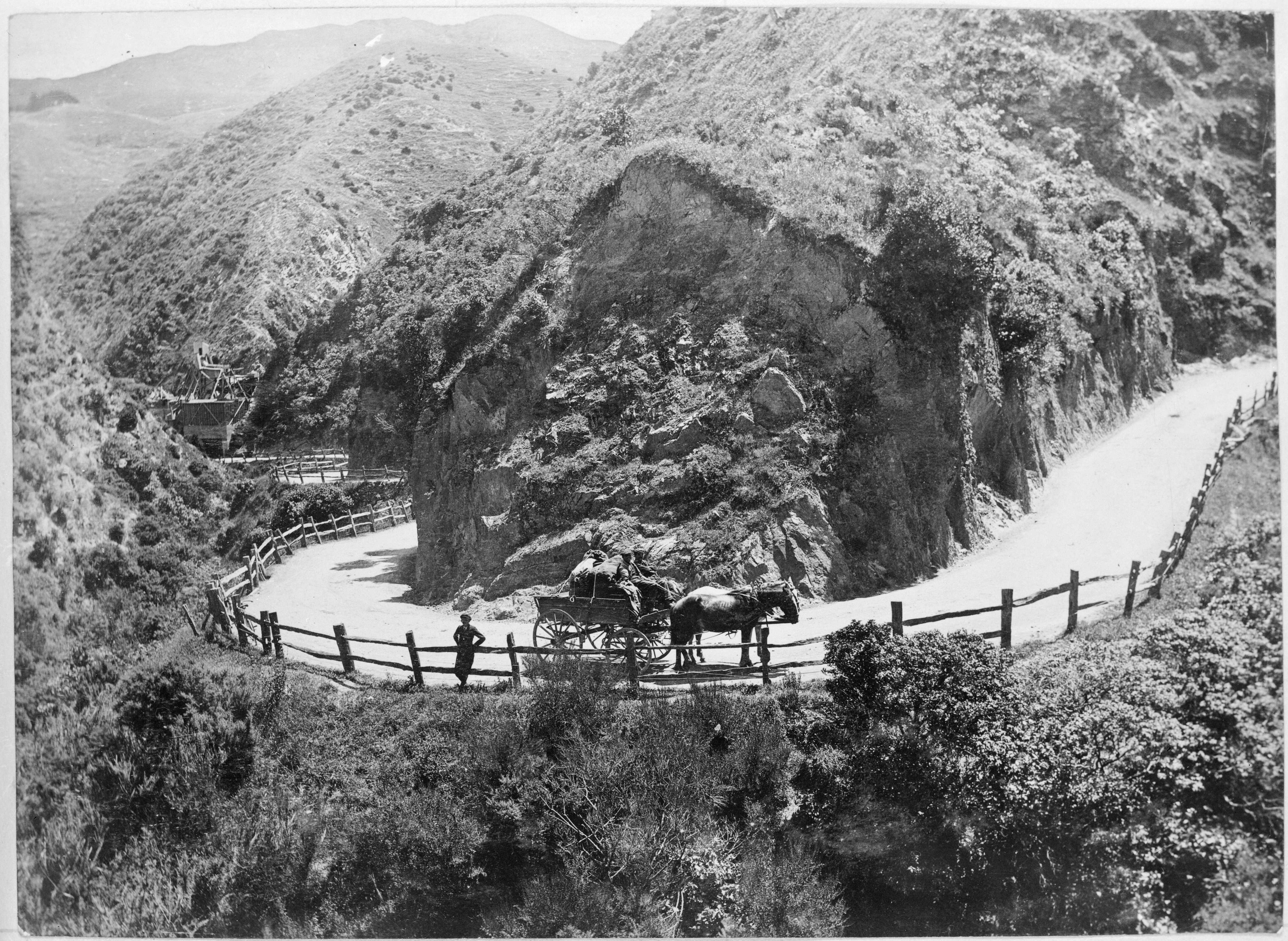
Ngauranga Gorge in 1912. Built to coach road standard.

A Ngahauranga Road Association was formed in late 1850 because residents of Johnsonville and places further north found the road up the Ngaio Gorge, now the Old Porirua Road, too steep and dangerous. The road had been built privately for access to a farm with its homestead within Trelissick Crescent, Ngaio. A fighting fund was established and a deputation sent to the governor of the province who advised the matter would be referred to the Surveyor General. The residents regarded the matter to be as important to Wellington as the tunnel through the Port Hills was to Christchurch.

Work began in 1853 and by the end of 1855 a distance of 946 metres (Note: 4 furlongs and 7 chains) had been formed and metalled. This section was the most easily built and cheapest out of the gorge's length. The next year saw another 3,340 metres (Note: 2 miles and 6 chains) added but that section was only a bridle path.

The Ngahauranga Road built to coach road standard was officially opened on 4 June 1858 when the Superintendent, led by the band of the 65th drove a four-horse phaeton along the line starting from the beach at Ngauranga.

By the early twentieth century the road was in use by an increasing number of both horse-drawn and motor vehicles and was known as a dangerous road in urgent need of improvement:

On the one hand are grim walls of rock, rising 200 feet in the air sheer from the road, and on the other is a noisy brook. [...] Every motorist knows the Gorge Road, and has had trouble there at one time or other. He has to be mighty careful in his steering, for there is generally a drop of from 20ft. to 30ft. within two feet of his outer wheel—sometimes less. [...] The real danger, however, is not the width or tortuousness or grade of the road—though they are all bad features. It lies in the fact that the road is not a solid road at all in many parts. Chains and chains of it are built up in what is known as half-bridges, i.e. where there was not sufficient solid to make even a twelve or thirteen feet road, planks or logs, or both, have been laid down at right angles to the road, and the outer ends have been nailed to a longitudinal joist supported by piles or posts, fixed in the rock below. Over these planks a layer of spoil and metal three or four inches thick has been spread, giving the section quite a solid appearance.

== Centennial Highway ==
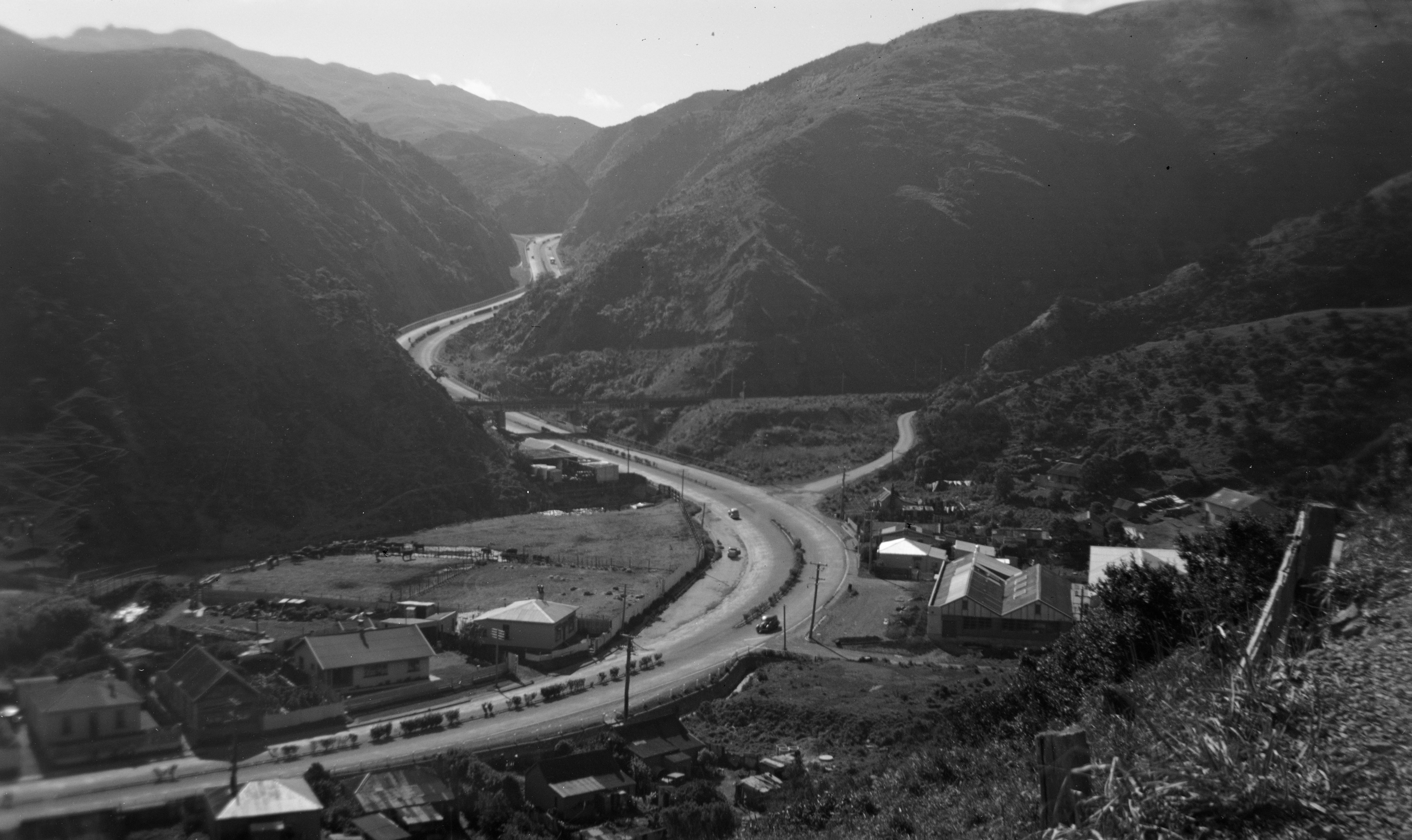
Ngauranga Gorge Road in October 1950. The North Island Main Trunk line overbridge at centre.

The road up the gorge was transformed between July 1938 and November 1939 as an extra part of the Wellington to Paekakariki project later dubbed the Centennial Highway. In June 1938, Minister of Works Bob Semple announced that administration of Ngauranga Gorge would leave the Wellington City and Suburban Highways Board and join the new system of State Highways. He said:

Motoring mishaps, some more serious than others, are not uncommon, due principally to the tortuous nature of this road and the density of traffic which amounts to between 3000 and 4000 vehicles per day. . . . Briefly the intention is to completely re-align and re-grade the road through the Ngahauranga Gorge so as ultimately to provide for four lanes of traffic.

As a symbol of the new administration's optimism and "the power of machinery over the picks and shovel", the Minister got into a bulldozer and wrecked a pile of wheelbarrows. The Ngauranga Gorge four-lane highway was officially opened on 4 November 1939. (Note: Statistics Length: 1¾ miles (2.8 kilometres) Earthwork: 600,000 cubic yards (458,733 m^{3}) Culverts: 10ft arched culvert 400ft (122 m) 10ft flat-top culvert 70ft (twin) (21 m) 60in and 72in conc. pipe 2920ft (890 m) 12in pipe 3950ft (1204 m) Kerbs 36960ft (11265 m) Sealing 47520 yds^{2} (39733 m^{2}) Footpath paving 7920 yds^{2} (6622 m^{2}) Stock tracks 70 chains (1408 m) Sewer and water main 3968ft (relay) (1210 m) Water drives 1240ft (378 m) Stream diversions, concrete flume and rock cut 47 chains (945 m) Sub-soil drains 6930ft (2112 m) Sumps 47)

== Motorway ==
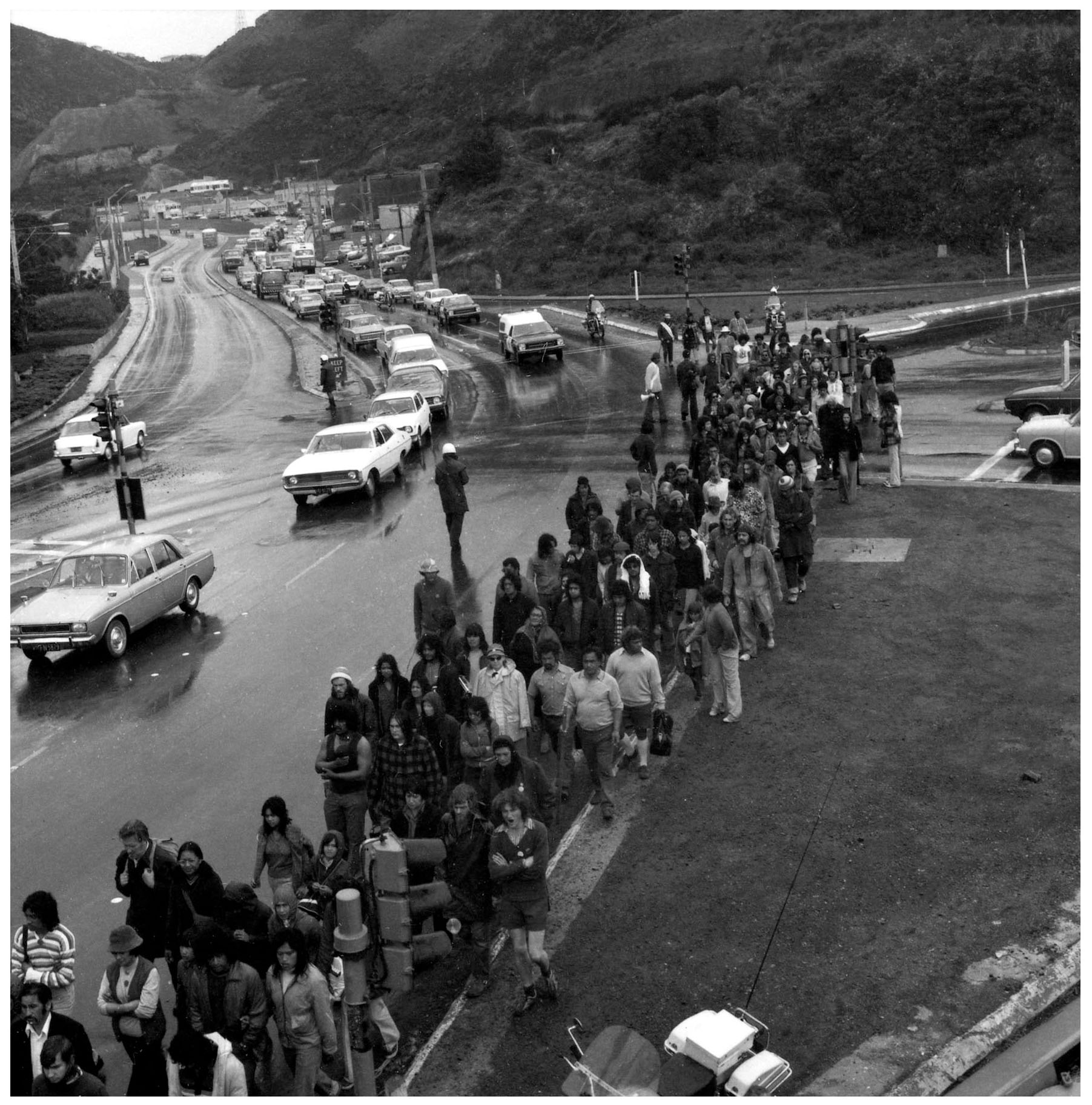
The intersection of SH1 and SH2 at the foot of the Gorge, 13 October 1975. Māori land march

The first section of the Johnsonville–Porirua Motorway opened in December 1950 but traffic was funnelled through Johnsonville until a bypass was completed towards the end of the 1950s joining the Gorge's four lanes to the Motorway. A junction controlled by lights remained between the two highways until the end of the 20th century. During the 1960s the road through the gorge was widened from four to six lanes. This required considerable excavation: the rock removed went into harbour reclamation for the construction of the Wellington Urban Motorway, completed in 1969.

The Ngauranga Interchange flyover joining State Highways 1 and 2 was finished in 1984.

The Newlands Interchange, at the top of the gorge, was constructed in 1997–98 to replace the simple junction controlled by traffic lights, which caused a large amount of congestion. Further excavation and widening of the gorge was required to construct the interchange and a short uphill section between Abattoirs Road and the Newlands exit was widened to four uphill lanes. The Newlands Interchange opened to traffic on 5 April 1998.

The North Island Main Trunk railway crosses the bottom of the gorge via an overbridge between the Tawa No 1 and Tawa No 2 Tunnels of the Tawa Flat deviation.

There is an industrial area and some retail outlets at the bottom of the gorge, where there was previously an abattoir. Another abattoir and a quarry are part way up the gorge.

== Maintenance ==
During a storm in 1976, Ngauranga Gorge was closed due to heavy flooding around Kaiwharawhara and the bottom of the Ngauranga Gorge road. The extensive flooding cut off Wellington from the Hutt Valley and the rest of the North Island.

On 11 July 2017 the southbound (down) lanes were closed by a rock slip about mid-day (until 6 am the next day) due to a "debris avalanche" on a modified slope above the lanes.
