= Ngauranga =

- Suburb
- Location within New Zealand Wellington
- Coordinates: 41.244°S 174.811°E
- Country: New Zealand
- City: Wellington City

Area
  - Land: 191 ha (470 acres)

Population (2023 Census)
  - Total: 51
  - Density: 27/km^{2} (69/sq mi)
- Train stations: Ngauranga

	Johnsonville, Newlands
Broadmeadows	Ngauranga	Wellington Harbour
	Kaiwharawhara, Khandallah

Ngauranga is a suburb of New Zealand's capital city, Wellington, in the lower North Island. Situated on the western bank of Wellington Harbour, it lies to the north of the centre of the city.

Ngauranga is lightly populated due to the rugged terrain and the area's focus on industry. The 2023 New Zealand census stated that the population of Ngauranga was 51.

It includes the Ngauranga Gorge, through which State Highway 1 passes on its route out of Wellington to Porirua and the west coast. To the east, State Highway 2 runs wedged between hills and Wellington Harbour on its route from Wellington to the Hutt Valley, Wairarapa, and beyond.

Alongside State Highway 2 is the Hutt Valley Line portion of the Wairarapa Line railway, which includes a station in Ngauranga served by frequent commuter trains. The North Island Main Trunk railway also passes through Ngauranga, via two tunnels of the Tawa Flat deviation, with a bridge between them crossing the Ngauranga Gorge.

The small amount of usable land in Ngauranga is primarily used for commercial and industrial activity, though there are some houses on the hill overlooking the motorway.

== Etymology ==
The name comes from the Māori language ngā ūranga, meaning "the landing place (for canoes)". Ngauranga Railway Station was known as "Ngahauranga" when it opened in 1874. A 1901 article in Māori stated that Ngahauranga was incorrect, but in 1946 Member of Parliament Eruera Tirikatene stated that Ngahauranga was correct and meant "beaten by strong winds". Both spellings, Ngahauranga and Ngauranga, were used in the press as late as the 1970s.

== Geography ==
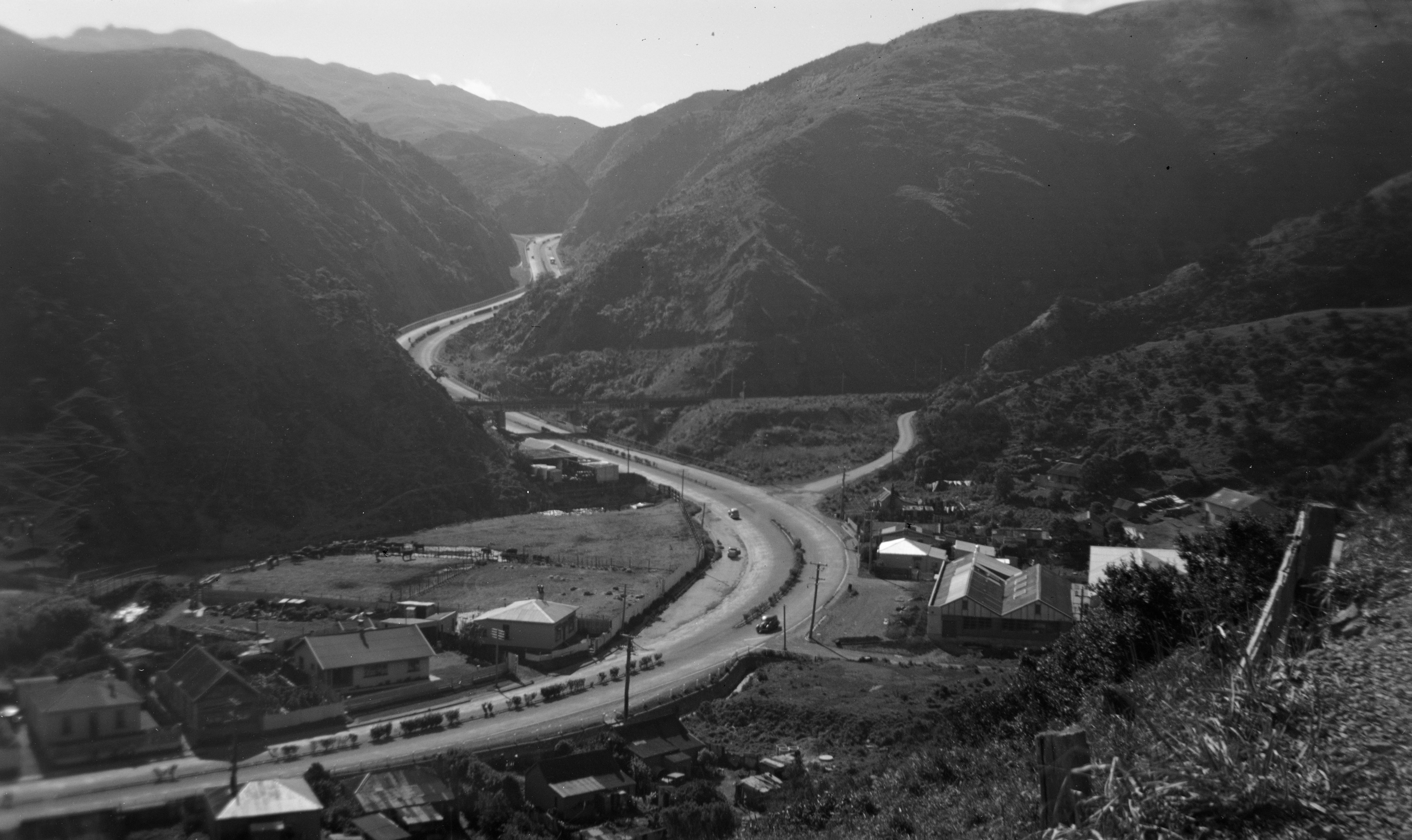
Ngauranga Gorge in 1950, with the Ngauranga Stream visible at lower left.

The suburb of Ngauranga consists of hilly terrain bisected by the Ngauranga Gorge. Along the harbour's edge are steep bluffs. The landscape of Ngauranga has been radically altered by quarrying and leveling of the hills to provide areas for industry and for motorway development.

The Waitohi Stream (also known as Ngauranga Stream) used to flow down the gorge, forming a long pond or lagoon at the base of the hills near the sea. Coutts Crawford described the gorge as he had seen it in 1839: "This valley, or gorge, was then extremely pretty. There was a pa with some cultivations cut out of the bush, but beyond that was the virgin forest. The stream was then unpolluted by masses of shingle, and flowed steadily". The pond disappeared after the 1855 Wairarapa earthquake uplifted the coastline at Ngauranga by about 1.5 m (5 ft), causing the stream to find a new channel. The stream was controlled with weirs and channels as the road through the gorge was built and industries were established, and by September 1939 the lower reaches of the stream were piped as far as the harbour.

Tyer's Stream rises from the hills of Khandallah on the south-western side of the gorge and flows down to meet the former Waitohi or Ngauranga Stream.

== History ==
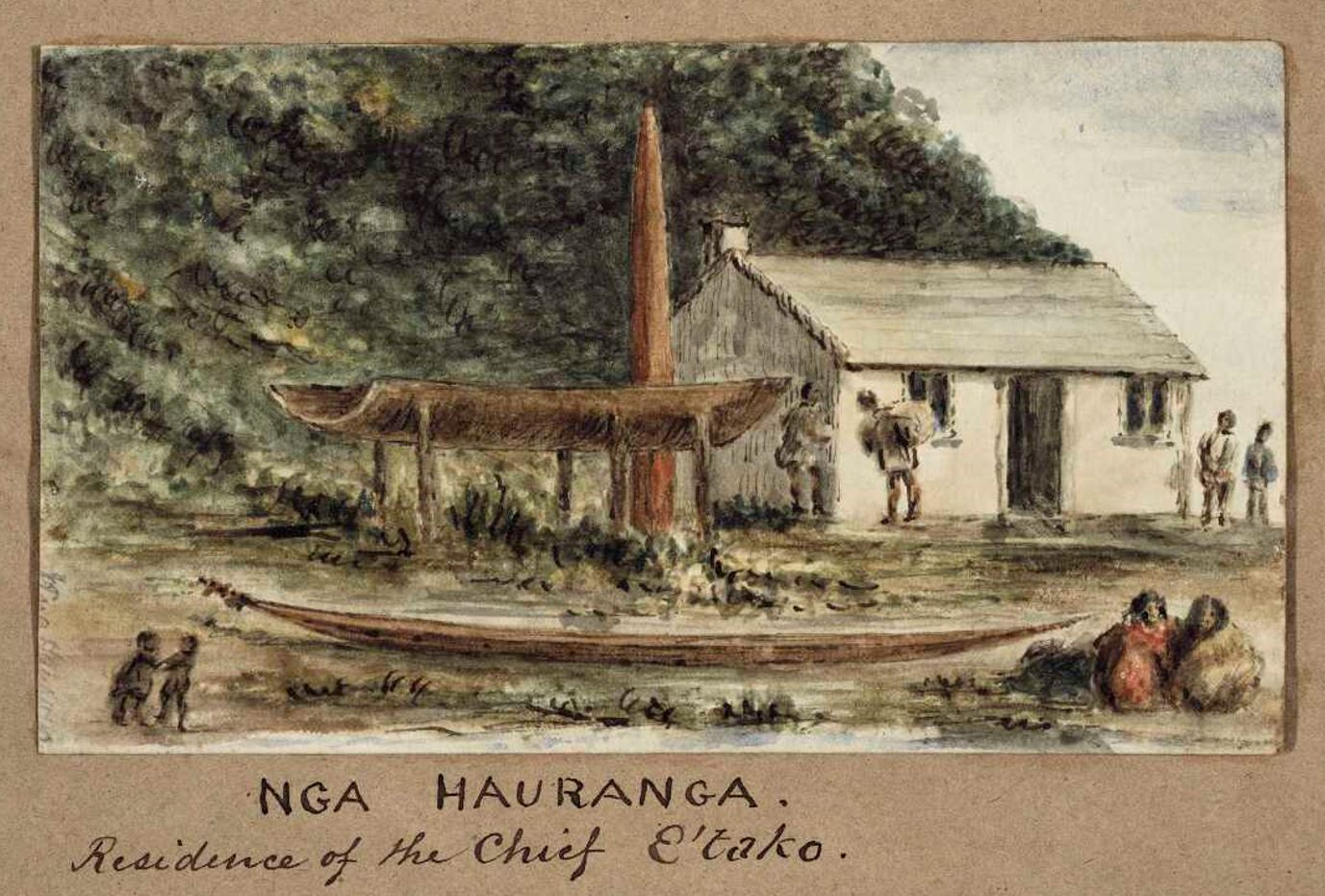
Canoe memorial to Te Wharepouri at Ngauranga, depicted by John Pearse around 1852

=== Māori settlement ===
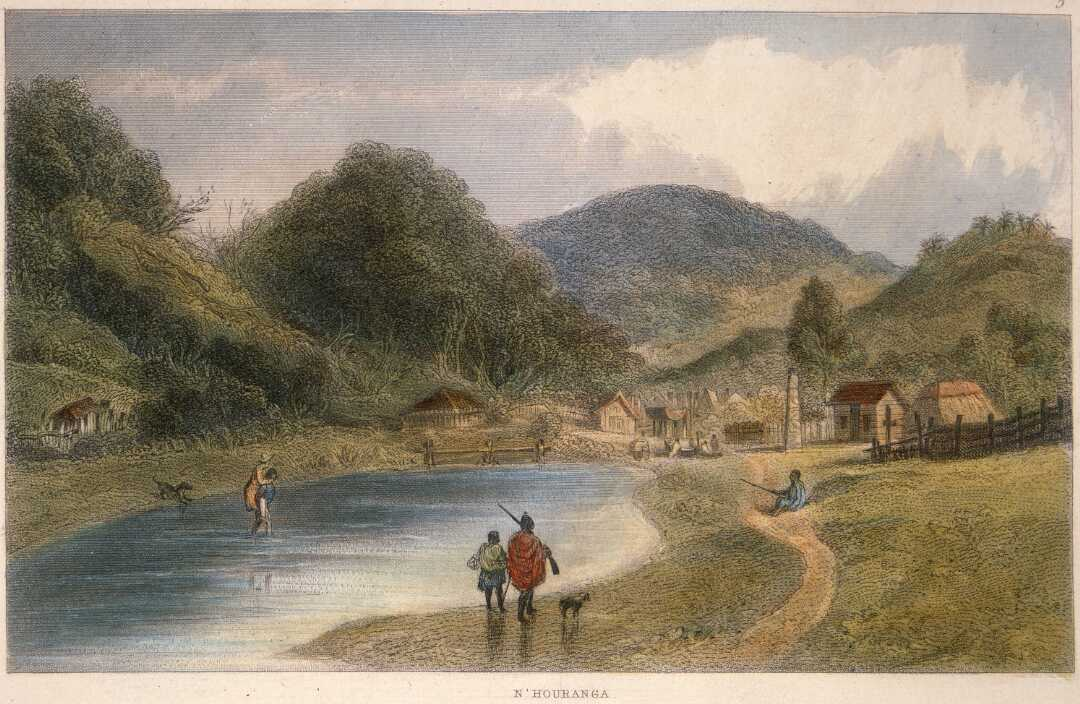
1840s: A Maori man carries a white woman across the Ngauranga Stream. In the background is the canoe memorial to Te Wharepouri.

There was a Māori settlement at the base of the Ngauranga Gorge in the nineteenth century. In 1835 the Ngāti Mutunga people who had been living there departed for the Chatham Islands, and chief Te Wharepouri and others moved in to the area, clearing bush and building two European-style houses at Ngauranga. Te Wharepouri sold land around Wellington, including Ngauranga, to the New Zealand Company when the Tory arrived at Wellington in 1839. In 1847 the New Zealand Company reserved several sections of land at Ngauranga for Māori. Te Wharepouri died in 1842. He was buried at Petone and a memorial was erected at Ngauranga. The memorial was created from a canoe cut into three parts: the middle section was raised up on six posts, and the end sections were placed together upright in the ground, painted red, carved and topped with feathers. In 1928 the broken remains of the memorial were taken to the Māori cemetery at Petone.

In 1850, a government report stated that there were 34 inhabitants at Ngauranga, who were followers of the late Te Wharepouri. They had gardens nearby, growing three acres (1.2 ha) of maize and six acres (2.4 ha) of potatoes. They also reared poultry which they sold along with firewood and fish. The same report stated that E Tako and his followers were intending to move from Kumototo in Wellington to Ngauranga. By 1862 only five Ngāti Tāwhirikura people were living at Ngauranga, with many of the tribe having gone to New Plymouth.

The reserve lands at Ngauranga went through the Native Land Court in 1886. From this time, Māori reserve land at Ngauranga was lost through succession, partition and land sales. Some was also lost to the Government, who took land for defence, road and rail during the 1880s.

=== European activity ===
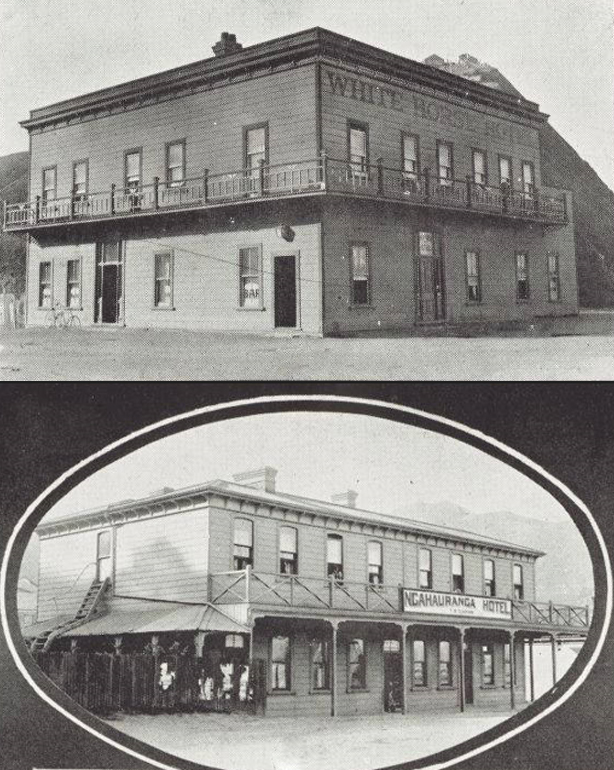
The White Horse Hotel and Ngahauranga Hotel in 1909

Possibly the first European to live at Ngauranga was William Smith, who Coutts Crawford met in 1839 at his home close to the Ngauranga Stream. Smith told Crawford that Colonel Wakefield of the New Zealand Company had bought the land and left him in charge.

Before a bridge was built across the Ngauranga Stream in 1856 to facilitate movement between the Hutt Valley and Wellington, Māori would transport people across the stream by canoe or by carrying them on their backs.

A road through Ngauranga Gorge, now part of State Highway 1, was opened in 1858 to provide access from Wellington to Porirua and the Kāpiti Coast. It has been upgraded many times.

Ngauranga became a busy coach stop on the road to Wellington from the Hutt Valley and Porirua. Sometimes vehicles would have to halt there if the roads were flooded or blocked by slips. W E Wallace established a hotel at Ngauranga in 1864, and Thomas Clapham's 'Ngahauranga Inn' was built soon after. Wallace's Inn was sold to James Futter in 1866 and later became the White Horse Hotel. Refurbished and then rebuilt, the White Horse Hotel operated as a hotel until 1909 when the district went 'dry', and after that was run as a boarding house. It was destroyed by fire in July 1914. After prohibition in 1909, the Ngahauranga Inn was used for a time as a boarding house for workers at the meat works. It was demolished in 1934.

Nineteenth century industries in the area included a flour mill with water wheel in the 1850s. Abattoirs and associated animal-processing businesses such as fellmongers, wool scourers, tanneries, and a manure and glue works also became established in the area. In 1866,Alfred Tyer established a tannery and fellmongery on the west side of Ngauranga Gorge near a tributary of Ngauranga Stream that came to be called Tyer's Stream.

Historical population of Ngauranga
Census year	Male	Female	Total
1878	35	38	73
1881	45	45	90
1886	83	56	138
1891	137	86	223
1896	154	93	247
1901	139	69	208
1906	174	80	254
1911	181	105	286
1916			219
1921			224

The population of Ngauranga peaked in the late nineteenth and early twentieth century, reaching almost 300 people by 1911. A community hall was built at Ngauranga in 1888, and the Education Department agreed to rent it for use as a school. Prior to this, around 35 children living at Ngauranga had to walk several miles along the poorly-formed Hutt Road to the school at Kaiwharawhara. Ngauranga School had closed by early 1903. The resident population decreased in the twentieth century: roading improvements and the introduction of motor cars meant it was no longer necessary for workers to live so close to the stench and pollution emitted by the businesses they worked at.

By 1950, industries operating at Ngauranga included an abattoir, a bacon factory, a soap manufacturer, a chemical manufacturer, a fertiliser plant and several smaller companies.

In the 1970s, land at Ngauranga was classified as 'Industrial D', for businesses that were set apart because of their dangerous activities or unpleasant conditions. After the Wellington Meat Export Company's abattoir closed in 1973 there was no longer a need for 'industrial D' zoning, and in 1977 Wellington City Council's new policy encouraged "development of Ngauranga as a modern and varied industrial and warehousing area". In the 21st century, a variety of businesses are located around Ngauranga Gorge.

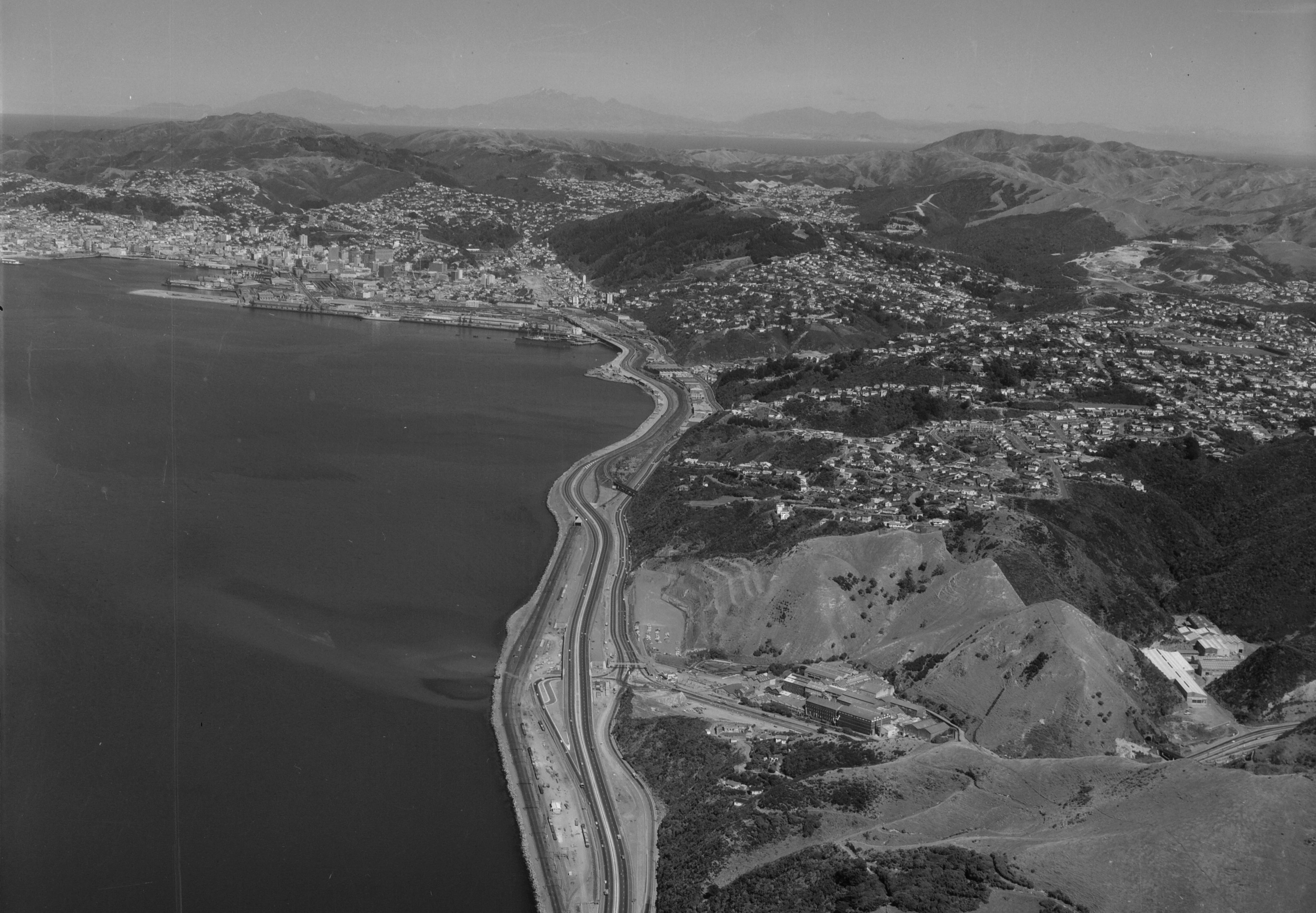
Wellington Harbour in 1969, with Ngauranga at centre bottom. Discharge from the former Ngauranga Stream shows as a discoloured plume in the harbour.

==== Abattoirs ====
A number of abattoirs have operated at Ngauranga. James and Henry Barber built a slaughterhouse at Ngauranga around 1865 after being denied a licence to continue slaughtering animals within the city limits. In 1883 their business was taken over and the Wellington Meat Preserving and Refrigerating Company was formed. Also in 1883, the Wellington Meat Export Company established an abattoir and marshalling yards at Ngauranga. In 1887, the Wellington Meat Preserving and Refrigerating Company opened a large new abattoir designed by Thomas Turnbull. The company also built a railway siding about 400 m long to transfer processed meat to the railway at Ngauranga Station. Wellington Meat Export Company and Wellington Meat Preserving and Refrigerating Company merged in 1889. The Wellington Meat Export Company needed a lot of water for its processing facilities, which it obtained from the Waiwhetu Aquifer, pumping water directly to Ngauranga from artesian bores at Alicetown. The business operated until 1973, when it closed because the company could not economically upgrade the works to meet new standards in hygiene and pollution control. The abandoned buildings on the site were demolished in 1978.

Wellington City Council erected a municipal abattoir at Ngauranga in 1909, levelling land and enclosing part of Ngauranga Stream as part of the works. The municipal abattoir was expanded in the late 1980s to process meat for export, then sold to Taylor Preston in 1991, with the council retaining a 51% share at that time. As of 2025, Taylor Preston still operates a meat-processing facility in Ngauranga Gorge.

The early abattoirs discharged effluent including blood and solid organic matter into the Ngauranga Stream before and after the stream was piped. Until the practice stopped, cloudy red water could often be seen in the harbour alongside Ngauranga. Giant petrels used to be quite common in Wellington Harbour around Ngauranga, feeding on offal that the abattoirs had discharged into the harbour.

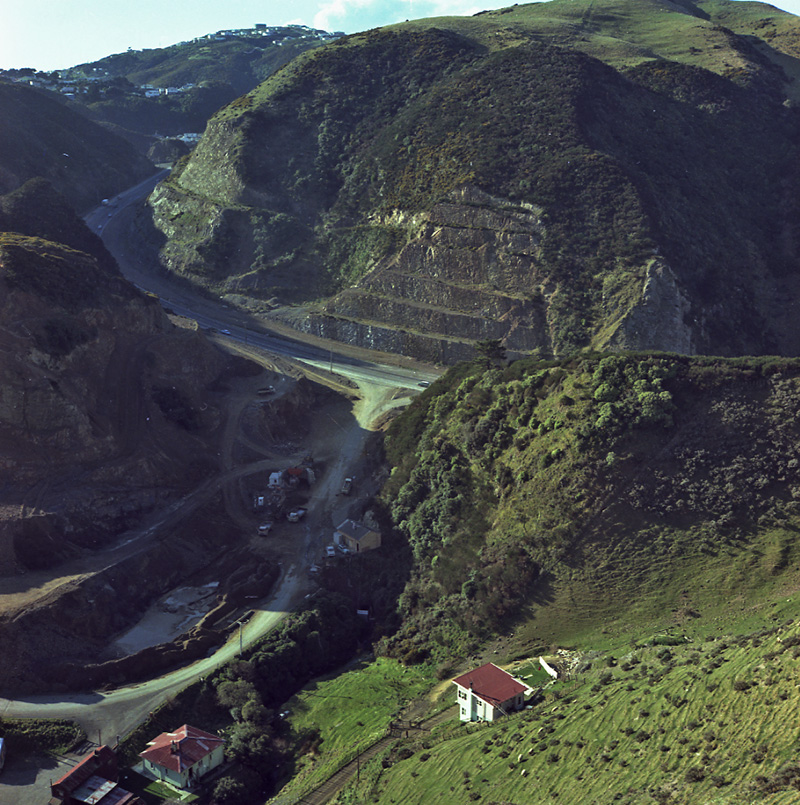
1967: new quarry at Ngauranga

==== Fort Kelburne ====
Fort Kelburne was a coastal artillery battery built between 1885 and 1887 at Ngauranga due to fears of possible war with Russia, the so-called 'Russian Scare'. Fort Kelburne and Fort Buckley at Kaiwharawhara were the first coastal defences to be built in a ring that was designed to protect Wellington Harbour. The fort was used for training purposes and was renovated during the First World War. After the war, ownership transferred to the Public Works Department. In 1963, the fort was demolished by the Public Works Department to make way for two large connecting roads between the Wellington Urban Motorway and Ngauranga Gorge.

==== Quarries ====
Stone has been quarried at Ngauranga since the 1870s. In 1917 Wellington City Council was granted permission to work an existing quarry on land belonging to the estate of Edwin Perritt at Ngauranga Gorge. Stone was also quarried from an adjacent piece of land owned by the council. By 1962 there was a private quarry operation, the Wellington City Council quarry and a disused council quarry all at Ngauranga Gorge. As of 2025, Wellington City Council's Kiwi Point Quarry is still operating.

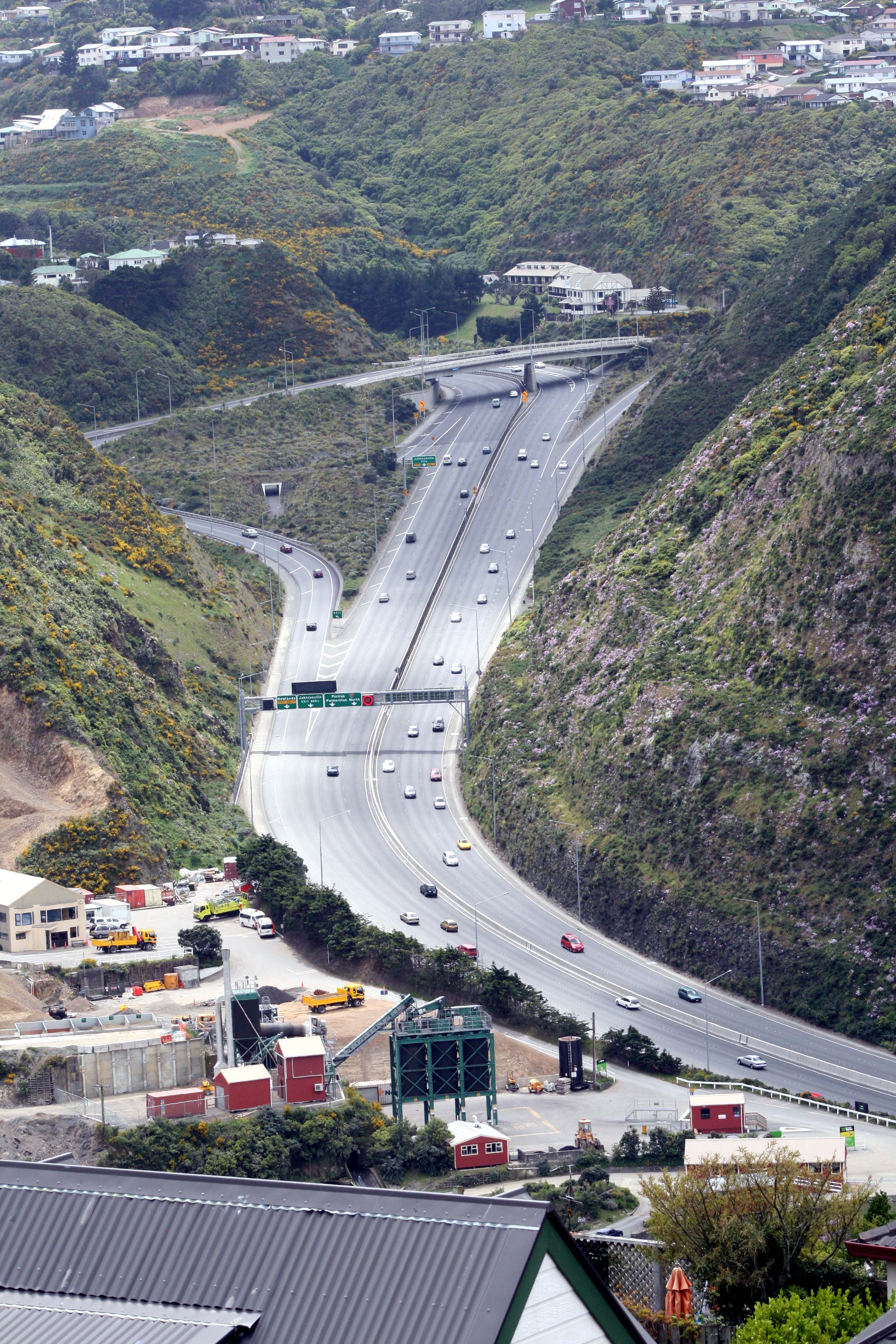
2007: Looking up Ngauranga Gorge (SH 1) from Rangoon Heights, Khandallah. In the centre is the Newlands Interchange.

== Demographics ==
Historical population
Year	Pop.	±% p.a.
2006	30	—
2013	45	+5.96%
2018	60	+5.92%
2023	51	−3.20%
The 2006 population is for a larger area of 2.27 km^{2}. Source:

Statistics New Zealand considers Ngauranga as part of the Newlands suburb. The area included in this section includes Malvern Road, Glovers Street, McCormack Place and Abbatoirs Road, and covers 1.91 km^{2} (0.74 sq mi).

Ngauranga had a population of 51 in the 2023 New Zealand census, a decrease of 9 people (−15.0%) since the 2018 census, and an increase of 6 people (13.3%) since the 2013 census. There were 30 males and 21 females in 21 dwellings. 5.9% of people identified as LGBTIQ+. The median age was 31.8 years (compared with 38.1 years nationally). There were 6 people (11.8%) aged under 15 years, 15 (29.4%) aged 15 to 29, 27 (52.9%) aged 30 to 64, and 3 (5.9%) aged 65 or older.

People could identify as more than one ethnicity. The results were 94.1% European (Pākehā), 11.8% Māori, 5.9% Pasifika, and 5.9% Asian. English was spoken by 100.0%, and other languages by 11.8%. No language could be spoken by 5.9% (e.g. too young to talk). The percentage of people born overseas was 17.6, compared with 28.8% nationally.

Religious affiliations were 17.6% Christian, and 5.9% other religions. People who answered that they had no religion were 64.7%, and 5.9% of people did not answer the census question.

Of those at least 15 years old, 15 (33.3%) people had a bachelor's or higher degree, 30 (66.7%) had a post-high school certificate or diploma, and 9 (20.0%) people exclusively held high school qualifications. The median income was $57,800, compared with $41,500 nationally. 12 people (26.7%) earned over $100,000 compared to 12.1% nationally. The employment status of those at least 15 was 33 (73.3%) full-time and 3 (6.7%) part-time.

== Transport ==
Ngauranga has the southern junction of SH1 and SH2.

Ngauranga is also served by rail. Ngauranga has one railway station, Ngauranga Railway Station. Bus services between Wellington and the Hutt Valley, and Wellington and Johnsonville/Newlands, pass through Ngauranga.

== See also ==
- Ngauranga Gorge
- Ngauranga Interchange
