= Terrace Motorway Tunnel =

Motorway Tunnel In Wellington, New Zealand

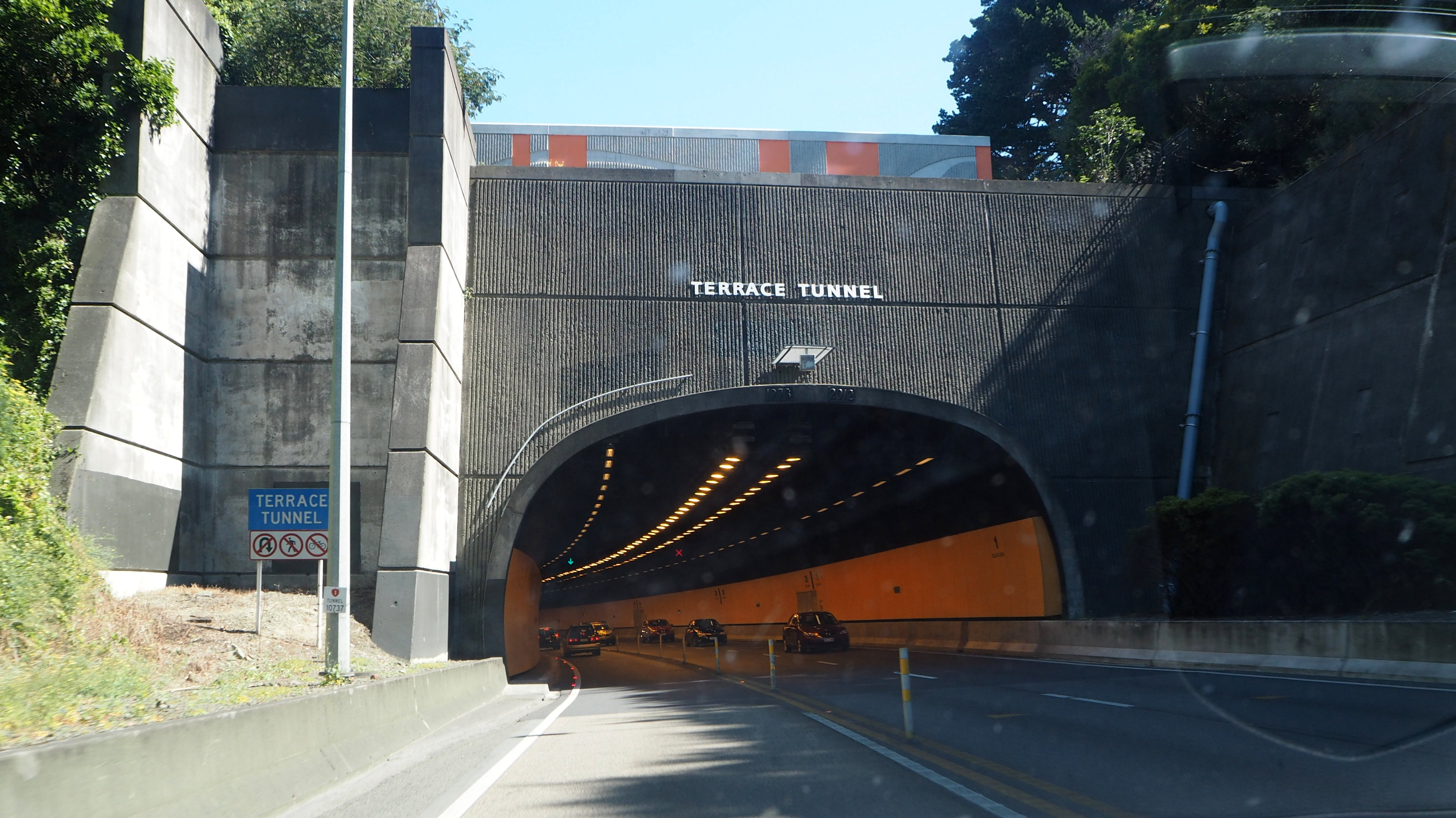
- Interactive map of Terrace Motorway Tunnel

Overview
- Location: Wellington City, New Zealand
- Route: State Highway 1 (Wellington Urban Motorway)

Operation
- Opened: 1978
- Owner: New Zealand Transport Agency
- Operator: New Zealand Transport Agency

Technical
- Length: 460 metres (1,510 ft)
- No. of lanes: Three (two northbound, one southbound)
- Operating speed: 70 km/h (43 mph)
- Tunnel clearance: 26 ft (7.9 m)
- Width: 42 ft (13 m)

The Terrace Tunnel takes the Wellington Urban Motorway (SH1) under The Terrace in central Wellington, New Zealand. Opened in 1978, it is 460 metres in length.

== Coordinates ==
- North portal: 41°17′14″S 174°46′18″E
- South portal: 41°17′29″S 174°46′18″E

== Design ==
The tunnel has three traffic lanes, one southbound and two northbound. The merge towards single southbound lane causes frequent congestion during peak periods rush hour. However flows at the southern end of the tunnel have improved somewhat since the opening of the Wellington Inner City Bypass.

The tunnel is one of the few single-carriageway stretches of motorway in New Zealand. All that separates opposing flows of traffic is a set of double no-overtaking lines and a series of slim fixed-in-place post-style road bollards.

The tunnel was opened as part of the extension of the Wellington Urban Motorway through Thorndon to Te Aro and was originally envisaged to include a parallel three-lane tunnel exclusively for southbound traffic (with the existing tunnel built for northbound traffic only). The motorway was intended to be extended to Mount Victoria Tunnel which would also have been duplicated.

However this proposal was shelved in the early 1970s as the rising cost of building the single tunnel ruled out duplication for the foreseeable future and the extension beyond Willis Street. The cut in funding sees the design of the motorway abruptly reduce from about the Bowen Street overbridge as six lanes are curtailed to three lanes. Appraisal of expected traffic flows also indicated that the second tunnel would not be needed for many years.

Some of the pillars for the second tunnel approaches are visible in the Clifton Terrace car park adjacent to the cable car line, as is some of the approach road which currently forms part of the upper deck of the Clifton Terrace carpark. These pillars may also be seen on the left hand (eastern) side of "The Terrace Looking South" webcam on the CityLink website.

A reversible lane (tidal flow) system as used on the Auckland Harbour Bridge has been proposed. Investigation as part of the tunnel link project raised questions about safety of such an option, but it has not been ruled out.

== State Highway status ==
When it opened in 1978, the tunnel was the southern end of State Highway 2. Alterations at the Ngauranga SH1/SH2 interchange in 1984 connected SH1 to the motorway; although SH1 continued off the Aotea Quay offramp until 1996. In 1996 Transit extended the SH1 status to the entire route from the end of the Wellington Urban Motorway to Wellington Airport. From 2007 this is via the Wellington Inner City Bypass.

== Systems and safety upgrade ==
In order to ensure that the tunnel continues to operate effectively the NZ Transport Agency (NZTA) is upgrading the fire fighting, lighting, ventilation and drainage systems, building new tunnel control buildings and making some earthquake safety improvements. This work will extend the working life of the Terrace Tunnel. The upgrade finished in 2012.

Upgrade works were being completed by the Wellington Tunnels Alliance formed by Leighton Contractors, Sinclair Knight Merz, Aecom and NZTA.

== Future of tunnel ==
The corridor incorporating the tunnel is part of the wider study being undertaken by the NZTA. Future duplication of the tunnel is currently being investigated.

In November 2024, the government announced that the NZTA had been instructed to begin the process of developing an investment case under the Roads of National Significance upgrade plan. The government announced its preferred option which included finishing the second Terrace tunnel, and duplicating the nearby Mt Victoria tunnel as one major project with multiple stages. The NZTA has been instructed to prepare an investment case for its board to consider approving mid 2025.
