= Te Awa =

Suburb of Napier, New Zealand

- Suburb
- Interactive map of Te Awa
- Coordinates: 39.515°S 176.917°E
- Country: New Zealand
- City: Napier
- Local authority: Napier City Council
- Electoral ward: Nelson Park

Area
  - Land: 134 ha (330 acres)

Population (June 2025)
  - Total: 2,540
  - Density: 1,900/km^{2} (4,910/sq mi)

Napier South	Central Napier
Marewa	Napier South	(Hawke Bay)
Meeanee

Te Awa is a suburb of the city of Napier, in the Hawke's Bay region of New Zealand's eastern North Island.

The suburb consists of a mix of 1920s small railway workers' houses which survived the 1931 Hawke's Bay earthquake, Art Deco homes built during the 1960s and 1970s, and twenty-first century subdivisions.

== History ==
A public meeting of Napier South swimmers formed Te Awa Swimming and Life-saving Club in 1913 to promote fresh water swimming in the Tūtaekurī River and to ensure the safety of swimmers there. The chosen name 'Te Awa' is Māori for 'the river', and referred to the Tūtaekurī.

A public meeting was called in 1928 to decide on a name for a proposed post office and postal area. Two names were put forward, 'Te Awa' and 'Erith', the latter being a village in England. The proposer of 'Erith' considered there to be too many Māori names in Hawke's Bay. Other speakers pointed out that the area had been named 'Te Awa' at the meeting in 1913, had become well known by that name due to its association with the Tūtaekurī river, and that the name had been incorporated into the names of local businesses. The promoter of the English name said that 'Erith' was a distinctive name and unique in the world, to which another person said, "This is New Zealand and we want a New Zealand name." A vote was taken and 'Te Awa' was selected by 41 to 2. The meeting also decided that the postal area would run from Todd Street and McVay Street in the north to Awatoto in the south. The northern part is today considered to be in Napier South, rather than Te Awa. The meeting also considered renaming the Hastings Street extension to either 'McGrath Street' or 'Te Awa Avenue', with the decision being that the northern stretch would be 'McGrath Street' and the southern length 'Te Awa Avenue'.

== Demographics ==
The statistical area of McLean Park, which corresponds to Te Awa, covers 1.34 km^{2} (0.52 sq mi) and had an estimated population of 2,540 as of June 2025, with a population density of 1,896 people per km^{2}.

Historical population
Year	Pop.	±% p.a.
2006	2,478	—
2013	2,406	−0.42%
2018	2,550	+1.17%
2023	2,484	−0.52%

McLean Park had a population of 2,484 in the 2023 New Zealand census, a decrease of 66 people (−2.6%) since the 2018 census, and an increase of 78 people (3.2%) since the 2013 census. There were 1,191 males, 1,287 females, and 6 people of other genders in 1,032 dwellings. 3.5% of people identified as LGBTIQ+. The median age was 40.9 years (compared with 38.1 years nationally). There were 408 people (16.4%) aged under 15 years, 486 (19.6%) aged 15 to 29, 1,155 (46.5%) aged 30 to 64, and 438 (17.6%) aged 65 or older.

People could identify as more than one ethnicity. The results were 85.5% European (Pākehā); 22.5% Māori; 3.3% Pasifika; 5.0% Asian; 0.6% Middle Eastern, Latin American and African New Zealanders (MELAA); and 3.0% other, which includes people giving their ethnicity as "New Zealander". English was spoken by 97.1%, Māori by 4.8%, Samoan by 0.4%, and other languages by 7.7%. No language could be spoken by 2.3% (e.g. too young to talk). New Zealand Sign Language was known by 0.6%. The percentage of people born overseas was 15.8, compared with 28.8% nationally.

Religious affiliations were 26.3% Christian, 0.8% Hindu, 0.4% Islam, 0.7% Māori religious beliefs, 0.7% Buddhist, 0.6% New Age, 0.1% Jewish, and 2.1% other religions. People who answered that they had no religion were 61.7%, and 6.5% of people did not answer the census question.

Of those at least 15 years old, 468 (22.5%) people had a bachelor's or higher degree, 1,170 (56.4%) had a post-high school certificate or diploma, and 438 (21.1%) people exclusively held high school qualifications. The median income was $40,900, compared with $41,500 nationally. 177 people (8.5%) earned over $100,000 compared to 12.1% nationally. The employment status of those at least 15 was 1,089 (52.5%) full-time, 276 (13.3%) part-time, and 48 (2.3%) unemployed.

== Education ==
Te Awa has two schools:

- Te Awa School, a co-educational Year 1–6 state primary school, with a roll of 169 as of July 2026. It opened in 1925.
- Napier Boys' High School, a single-sex state school, with a roll of 1,296. It opened in 1872.

Residents also use two other schools:

- Napier Intermediate, a co-educational state intermediate school, with a roll of 362, provides intermediate education.
- Napier Girls' High School is single-sex state high school, with a roll of 1,028 as of July 2026.
