= Napier South =

Suburb of Napier, New Zealand

- Suburb
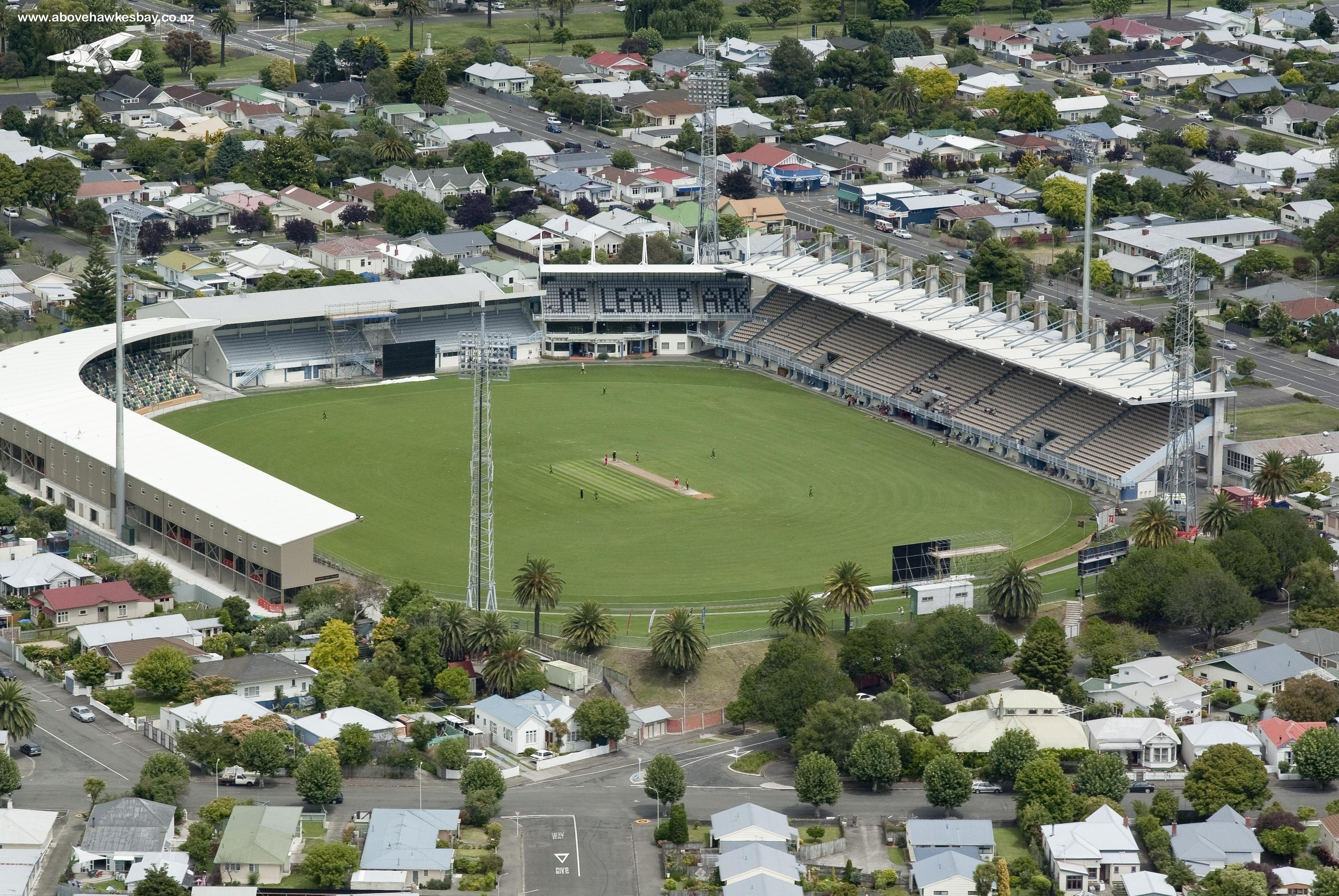
- McLean Park in Napier South
- Interactive map of Napier South
- Coordinates: 39.500°S 176.913°E
- Country: New Zealand
- City: Napier
- Local authority: Napier City Council
- Electoral ward: Nelson Park

Area
  - Land: 78 ha (190 acres)

Population (June 2025)
  - Total: 2,180
  - Density: 2,800/km^{2} (7,200/sq mi)

Hospital Hill		Central Napier
Marewa	Napier South	(Hawke Bay)
Meeanee	Te Awa

Napier South is a suburb of the city of Napier, in the Hawke's Bay region of New Zealand's eastern North Island. For some purposes, such as postal, it extends to include the Napier Central statistical area (the central business district), which is covered here at Central Napier.

== History ==
The area that is now Napier South was originally part of the Whare-o-Maraenui swamp. Some reclamation of the area began in the mid-1870s, when Taradale Road was built, forming an embankment that trapped silt being brought down by the Tūtaekurī River, which emptied into Ahuriri Lagoon at that time. Reclamation of the area began in earnest in 1900, and the first sections were offered for sale in 1908. Two areas were set aside as parks, the 20-acre Nelson Park and 10-acre McLean Park. Napier South was governed by a town board from 1908 until 1915, when it merged with Napier borough.

== Demographics ==
The statistical area of Nelson Park, which corresponds to Napier South, covers 0.78 km^{2} (0.30 sq mi) and had an estimated population of 2,180 as of June 2025, with a population density of 1,028 people per km^{2}.

Historical population
Year	Pop.	±% p.a.
2006	2,043	—
2013	2,139	+0.66%
2018	2,181	+0.39%
2023	2,172	−0.08%

Nelson Park had a population of 2,172 in the 2023 New Zealand census, a decrease of 9 people (−0.4%) since the 2018 census, and an increase of 33 people (1.5%) since the 2013 census. There were 1,026 males, 1,137 females, and 9 people of other genders in 840 dwellings. 2.5% of people identified as LGBTIQ+. The median age was 41.2 years (compared with 38.1 years nationally). There were 426 people (19.6%) aged under 15 years, 387 (17.8%) aged 15 to 29, 975 (44.9%) aged 30 to 64, and 384 (17.7%) aged 65 or older.

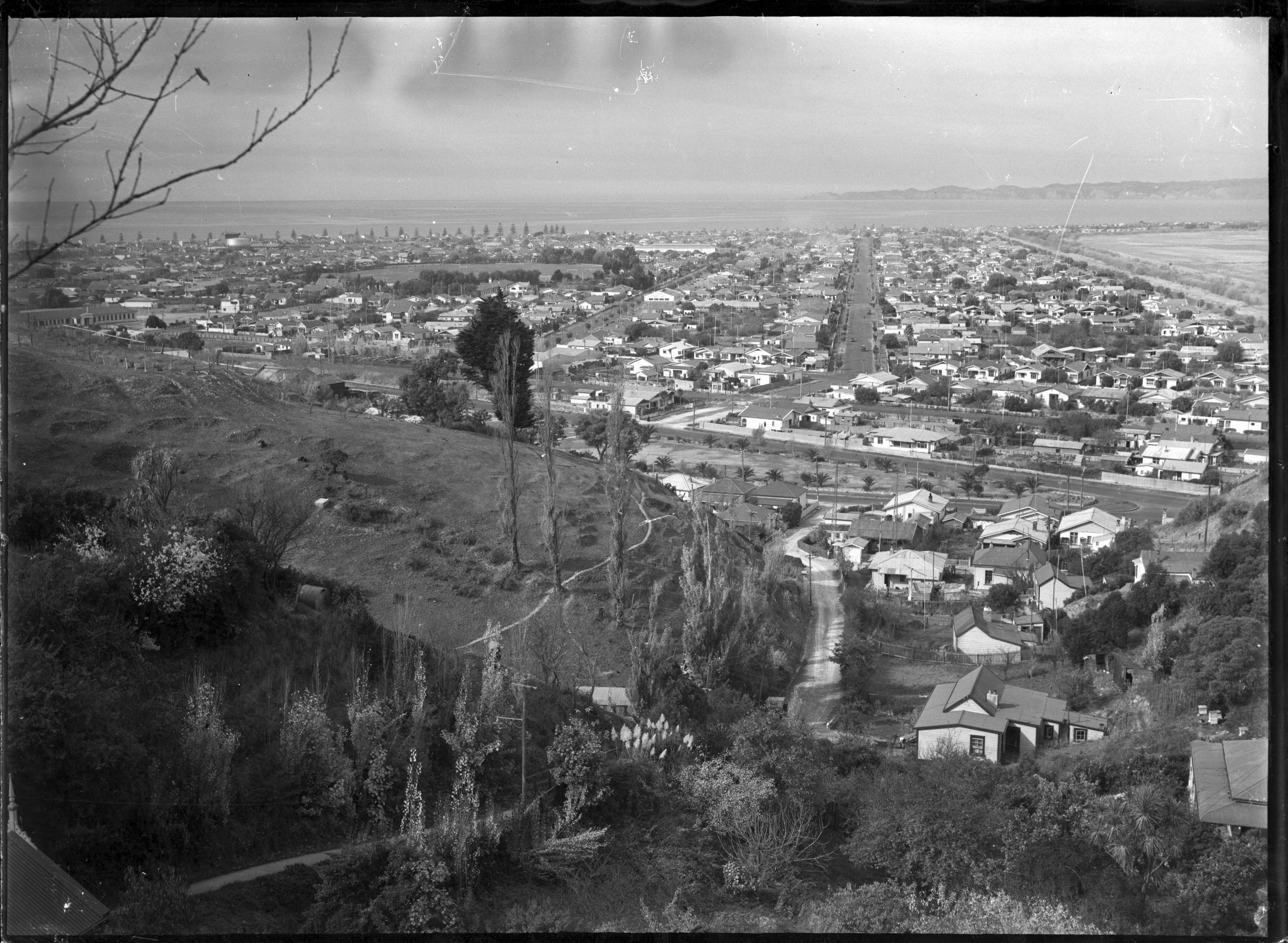
Napier South on the flat in about the early 1930s. The large oval of Nelson Park is in the distance, just left of centre.

People could identify as more than one ethnicity. The results were 82.3% European (Pākehā); 22.1% Māori; 3.6% Pasifika; 5.0% Asian; 2.3% Middle Eastern, Latin American and African New Zealanders (MELAA); and 2.8% other, which includes people giving their ethnicity as "New Zealander". English was spoken by 97.8%, Māori by 3.7%, Samoan by 0.8%, and other languages by 8.0%. No language could be spoken by 1.5% (e.g. too young to talk). New Zealand Sign Language was known by 0.4%. The percentage of people born overseas was 18.0, compared with 28.8% nationally.

Religious affiliations were 27.3% Christian, 0.8% Hindu, 1.4% Islam, 2.2% Māori religious beliefs, 1.0% Buddhist, 0.6% New Age, 0.1% Jewish, and 2.2% other religions. People who answered that they had no religion were 57.3%, and 7.5% of people did not answer the census question.

Of those at least 15 years old, 366 (21.0%) people had a bachelor's or higher degree, 948 (54.3%) had a post-high school certificate or diploma, and 435 (24.9%) people exclusively held high school qualifications. The median income was $36,000, compared with $41,500 nationally. 177 people (10.1%) earned over $100,000 compared to 12.1% nationally. The employment status of those at least 15 was 831 (47.6%) full-time, 267 (15.3%) part-time, and 54 (3.1%) unemployed.

== Education ==
Nelson Park School is a co-educational Year 0–6 state primary school situated on Kennedy Road/Jull Street with a roll of 330. It opened as Napier West School in 1914.

Napier Intermediate is a co-educational state intermediate school situated on Jull Street with a roll of 363. It was founded in 1933. It sits on what was originally going to be the second site of Napier Technical College, but this did not happen due to the 1931 Hawke's Bay earthquake.

Both schools are co-educational. Rolls are as of March 2026.
