= Awatoto =

Suburb of Napier, New Zealand

- Suburb
- Interactive map of Awatoto
- Coordinates: 39.5447°S 176.9186°E
- Country: New Zealand
- City: Napier
- Local authority: Napier City Council
- Electoral ward: Taradale

Area
  - Land: 411 ha (1,020 acres)

Population (2023 Census)
  - Total: 933
  - Density: 227/km^{2} (588/sq mi)

Maraenui	Te Awa	Hawke Bay
Meeanee	Awatoto	Hawke Bay
Pakowhai	Clive	Hawke Bay

Awatoto is a coastal suburb area within the city of Napier, Hawke's Bay, New Zealand. It stretches along the coast south of Te Awa and the central city. The northern part of Awatoto is residential, while the southern part is industrial, including heavy industry.

The New Zealand Ministry for Culture and Heritage gives a translation of "stream for hauling canoes" for Awatōtō.

== History ==
Ngāti Kahungunu occupied the area prior to colonisation. Waitangi Mission Station was set up on the north bank of the Ngaruroro River for the Church Missionary Society by William Colenso in 1844. Awatoto was included in the sale of the 265,000 acres (107,000 ha) Ahuriri Block for £1,500 on 17 November 1851. A soap works was set up in 1883. It burnt down in 1910 and 1915 and was flooded in 1917. Settlement of the area dates from the late 1800s, although population was minimal until the post-war years. Meeanee developed as a small settlement in the 1940s and 1950s, servicing the surrounding dairy farms. The population increased from the mid-1990s, a result of new dwellings being added to the area.

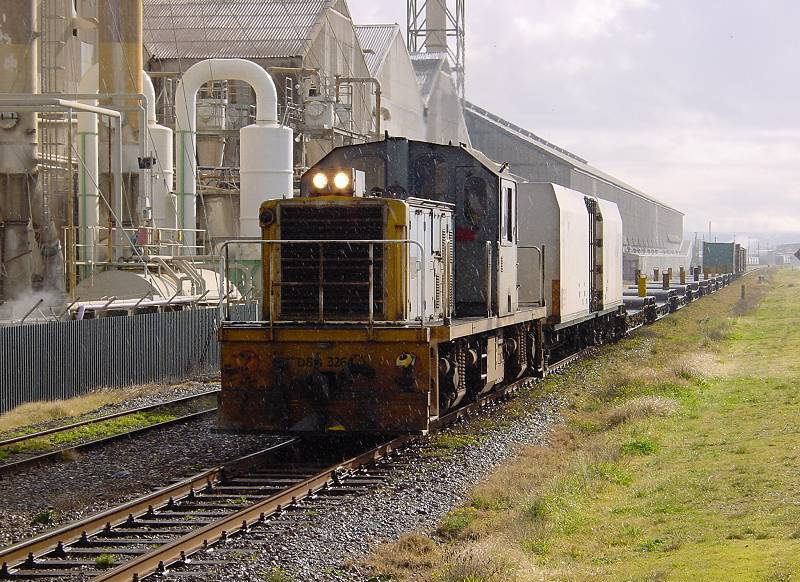
Train beside Awatoto fertiliser factory in 2006

=== Railway station ===
Awatoto railway station was near Awatoto Road, opened on 20 June 1884. In 1880 authority was sought for £45 to be spent building a station and platform at Awatoto. It was a flag station, on the first 18.8 km (11.7 mi) section of the Palmerston North–Gisborne Line, which opened on 12 October 1874, from Napier to Hastings. The line was built by international contractors John Brogden and Sons. They organised the first train carrying passengers from Napier to Waitangi on Tuesday 30 June 1874.

By 1896 Awatoto had a shelter shed, platform, cart approach and a passing loop for 18 wagons, extended to 23 in 1898, 45 in 1911 and 100 in 1954. In 1914 it became a tablet station and a railway house was built for the tablet man. In 1972 a new crossing loop was built nearer Waitangi bridge. On 31 January 1982 Awatoto closed to goods, except in wagon loads, and to passengers. It closed completely on 22 September 1986. Only a single track now runs through the former station site.

	Former adjoining stations	
Clive; Line open, station closed 3.49 km (2.17 mi)	Palmerston North–Gisborne Line	Napier; Line open, station closed 6.14 km (3.82 mi)

== Geography ==
Awatoto is on a flood plain, separated from the Pacific Ocean by a shingle spit, just north of where the Clive, Ngaruroro and Tūtaekurī River estuaries meet Hawke Bay. Until the 1931 earthquake the Tūtaekurī River flowed north to Ahuriri Lagoon, but a diversion was built from 1934, diverting the river from 3 June 1936. The Heretaunga Plains Flood Control Scheme, with stop banking, pumps and gravel and river mouth management, helps control floodwaters, but they can still reach the underside of bridges, requiring closures.

Awatoto is some 5 km (3.1 mi) south of the Napier city centre at 39°S 176°E, on the coast of Hawke's Bay. State Highway 51 (until 1 August 2019 it was SH2) passes through Awatoto, along the coastline between Napier and Hastings. A cycleway opened from Bluff Hill to Awatoto in 2004. It was extended south in 2016, over a 300 m (980 ft) long x 2.3 m (7 ft 7 in) wide, 145 tonne, steel, clip-on bridge.

The coast at Awatoto is mostly used for fishing. Water activities take place at the Awatoto river mouth just south of the industrial area.

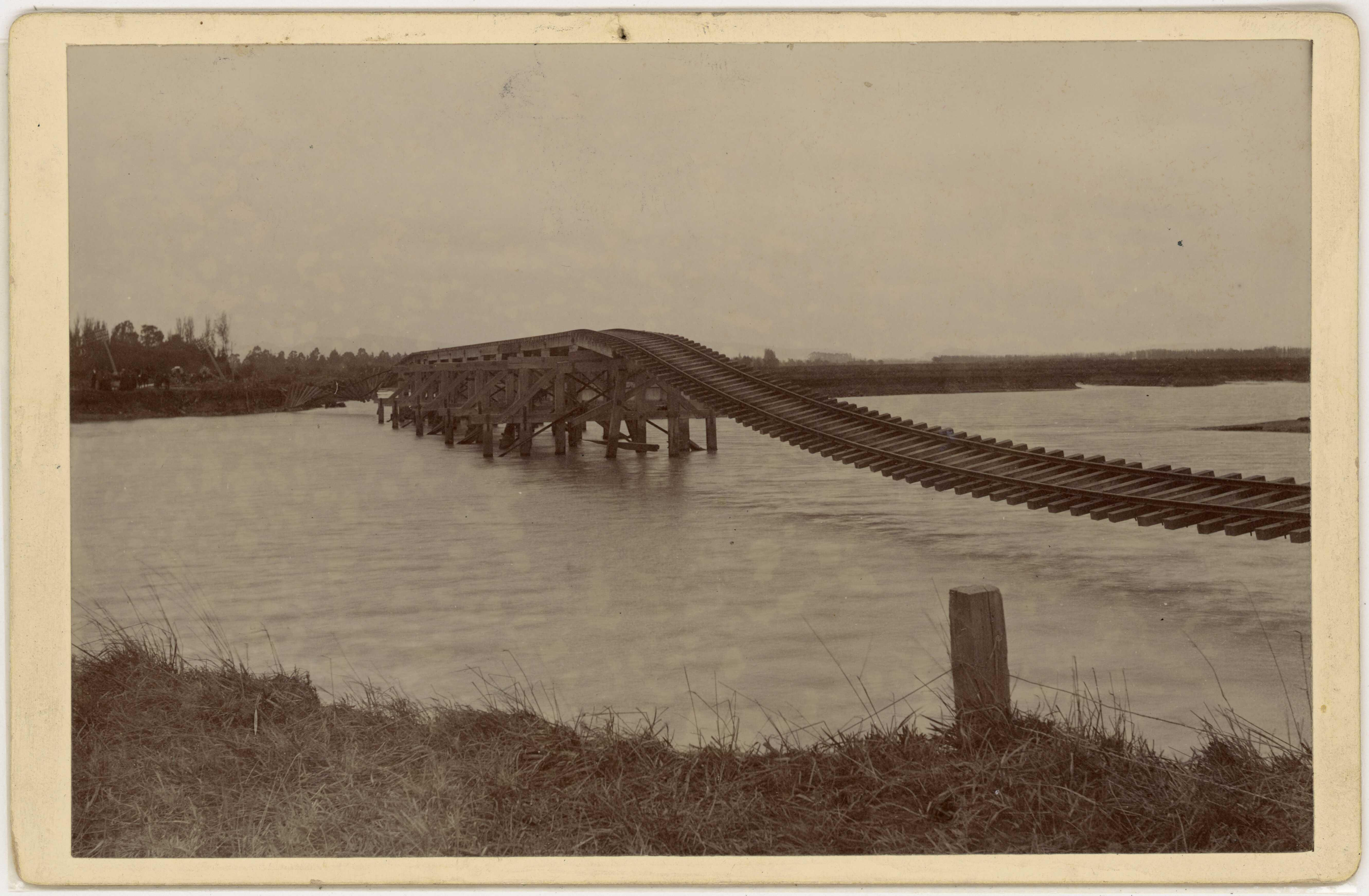
Waitangi bridge after April 1897 flood

=== Waitangi bridges ===
Both road and railway cross the Waitangi river estuary to the south of Awatoto.

==== Road ====
From about 1861 a road ran along the beach, with a punt to cross the estuary. Following sea erosion of the beach, a new bridge was built in 1865. Undermined piles closed the bridge in 1867. It was rebuilt in 1897. The bridge was closed for a fortnight in 1905, when temporary piles gave way under a traction engine. Spans washed out in a 1918 flood. It collapsed under 2 trucks in 1928. Four piers were undermined in May 1938, closing the bridge until September, though people and vehicles continued to use it for a time.

==== Rail ====
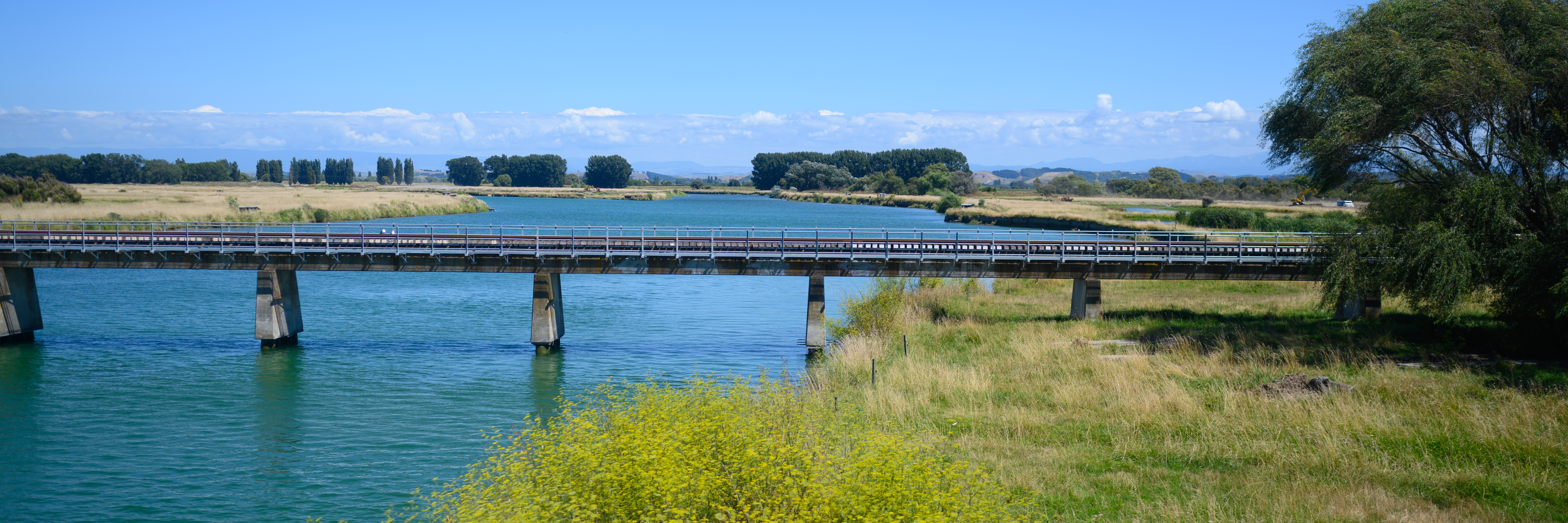
Waitangi rail bridge on 9 February 2019

The rail bridge was originally built in 1873. One source says it is 293 m (961 ft) long, but a 1962 advert for its replacement said the overall length was 1,080 ft (330 m) on 27 continuous reinforced concrete spans of 40 ft (12 m) on concrete filled piers, each pier having 3 x 2 ft (0.61 m) octagonal piles with a nominal length of about 75 ft (23 m).

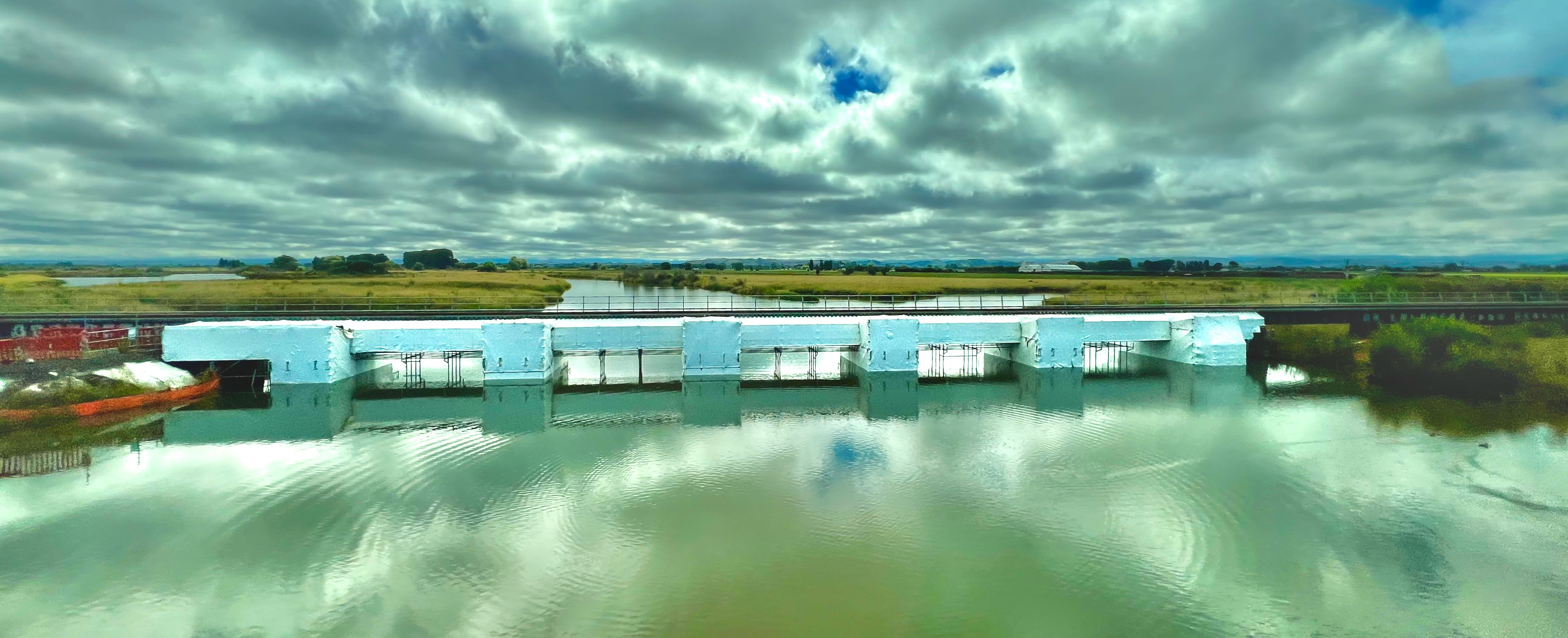
Waitangi partly rebuilt railway bridge in 2025, with the confluence of the Ngaruoro and Tūtaekurī Rivers just beyond

In February 2023 the rail bridge at Awatoto was wiped out by Cyclone Gabrielle. It reopened on 15 September 2023, though the fibre cable it carried was temporarily moved to the road bridge next day. The replacement bridge rests on 12 piles of 35 m (38 yd) to 43 m (47 yd) depth. In 2026 they will be protected from erosion by rip-rap.

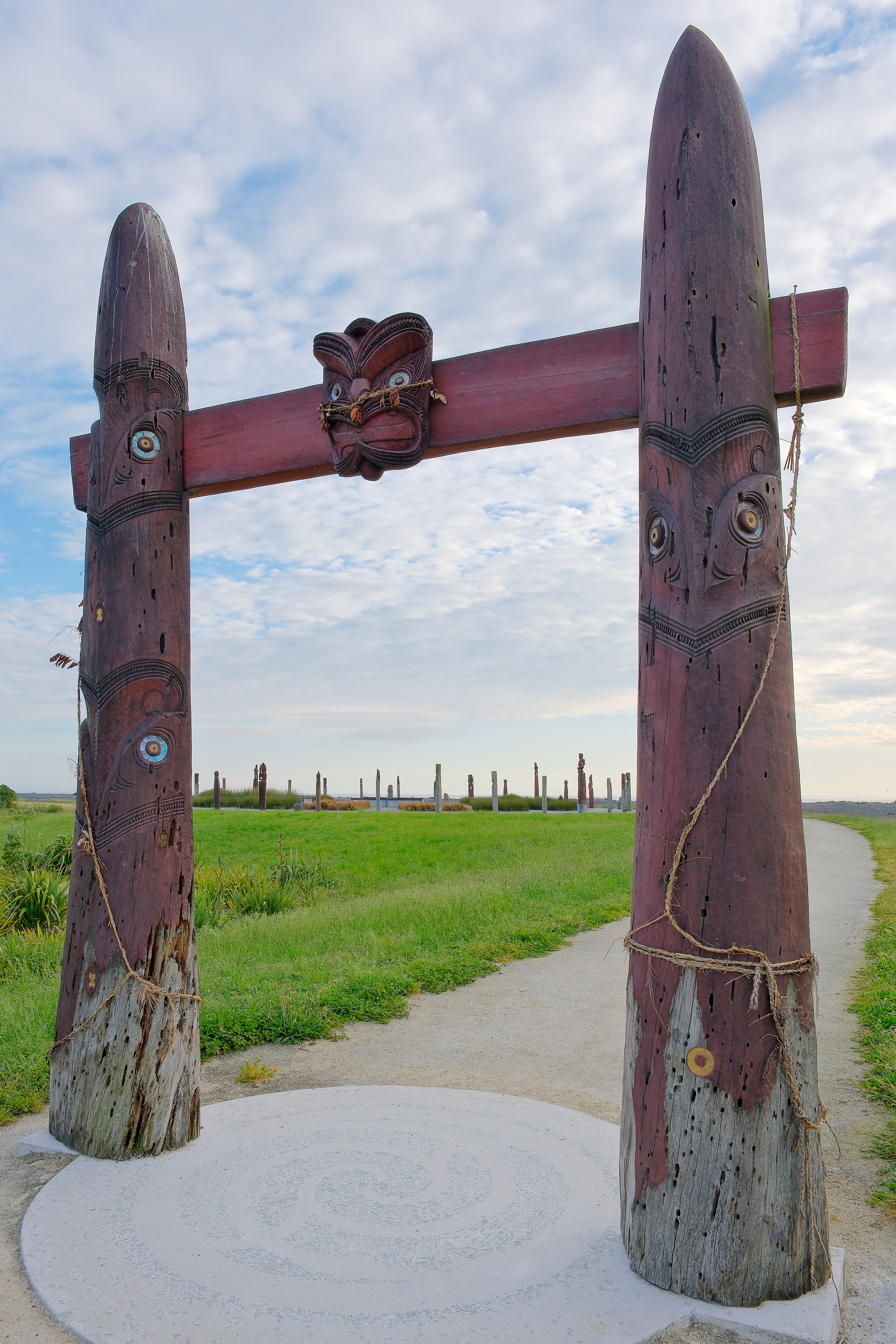
Ātea a Rangi star compass

=== Waitangi Regional Park ===
Waitangi Regional Park covers about 300 ha (740 acres) and extends about 5 km (3.1 mi) along the coast between Awatoto and Haumoana. The area is home to several species of seabirds and water fowl such as herons, spoonbills, godwits, and gannets. A 6 ha (15 acres) wetland was created in 2009, and in 2015 an adjacent 15 ha (37 acres) wetland was re-established, also providing a habitat for native fish species.

In 2017, the Ātea a Rangi star compass was installed just north of the bridge over the Ngaruroro River. The circle of carved wooden posts (pou) represents the points of the compass and symbolises the navigational skills of ancient Pacific Island explorers who navigated the oceans to arrive here and settle in the area. The celestial compass is also used to pass the art of Whakatere waka (traditional navigation) to new generations.

== Industry ==
Just to the north of the wetland is the largest superphosphate factory in the country, producing around 250,000 tonnes a year. It began in 1953 on 16 ha (40 acres) and was bought by Ravensdown in 1987. It is Napier port's largest importer. Rinse water from a boiler water treatment plant is discharged into the estuary. In 2020 aluminium, cadmium, copper, chromium, zinc, fluoride, nitrate and nickel levels in the drain were above ANZECC (2000) trigger levels.

UEB Industries, parent company of Bremworth Carpet, built a woolen yarn spinning factory at Awatoto in 1967. It is now operated by Bremworth.

Napier's wastewater plant is at Awatoto, with treated wastewater discharged into Hawke Bay through a 1.5 km (0.9 mi) outfall pipe. The plant and outfall were opened in 1973, replacing the previous outfall at Ahuriri. Originally a comminutor station, the plant was upgraded with milliscreens in 1991, and with biological trickling filters in 2014. It takes sewage from most of Napier, but not residential Awatoto nor nearby Meeanee.

Paua Fresh Ltd had an paua (abalone) farm at Awatoto. The facility produced 6,000 kg annually. It sold live abalone throughout New Zealand, and supplied frozen product on request. The operation ceased in about 2011 and the building it used burnt down in 2014.

Awatoto is the site of water extraction and bottling.

== Demographics ==
Awatoto covers 4.11 km^{2} (1.59 sq mi). It is part of the Meeanee-Awatoto statistical area.

Historical population
Year	Pop.	±% p.a.
2006	351	—
2013	558	+6.85%
2018	795	+7.34%
2023	933	+3.25%

Awatoto had a population of 933 in the 2023 New Zealand census, an increase of 138 people (17.4%) since the 2018 census, and an increase of 375 people (67.2%) since the 2013 census. There were 456 males and 480 females in 360 dwellings. 3.9% of people identified as LGBTIQ+. There were 135 people (14.5%) aged under 15 years, 153 (16.4%) aged 15 to 29, 441 (47.3%) aged 30 to 64, and 204 (21.9%) aged 65 or older.

People could identify as more than one ethnicity. The results were 83.9% European (Pākehā); 15.4% Māori; 5.1% Pasifika; 10.3% Asian; 0.6% Middle Eastern, Latin American and African New Zealanders (MELAA); and 3.2% other, which includes people giving their ethnicity as "New Zealander". English was spoken by 97.4%, Māori by 2.6%, Samoan by 0.3%, and other languages by 10.9%. No language could be spoken by 1.3% (e.g. too young to talk). New Zealand Sign Language was known by 0.3%. The percentage of people born overseas was 22.8, compared with 28.8% nationally.

Religious affiliations were 32.5% Christian, 1.9% Hindu, 0.6% Māori religious beliefs, 1.3% Buddhist, 0.3% New Age, and 2.6% other religions. People who answered that they had no religion were 55.0%, and 6.1% of people did not answer the census question.

Of those at least 15 years old, 198 (24.8%) people had a bachelor's or higher degree, 429 (53.8%) had a post-high school certificate or diploma, and 177 (22.2%) people exclusively held high school qualifications. 99 people (12.4%) earned over $100,000 compared to 12.1% nationally. The employment status of those at least 15 was 453 (56.8%) full-time, 84 (10.5%) part-time, and 21 (2.6%) unemployed.
