= Napier Hill =

Suburb of Napier, New Zealand

- Suburb
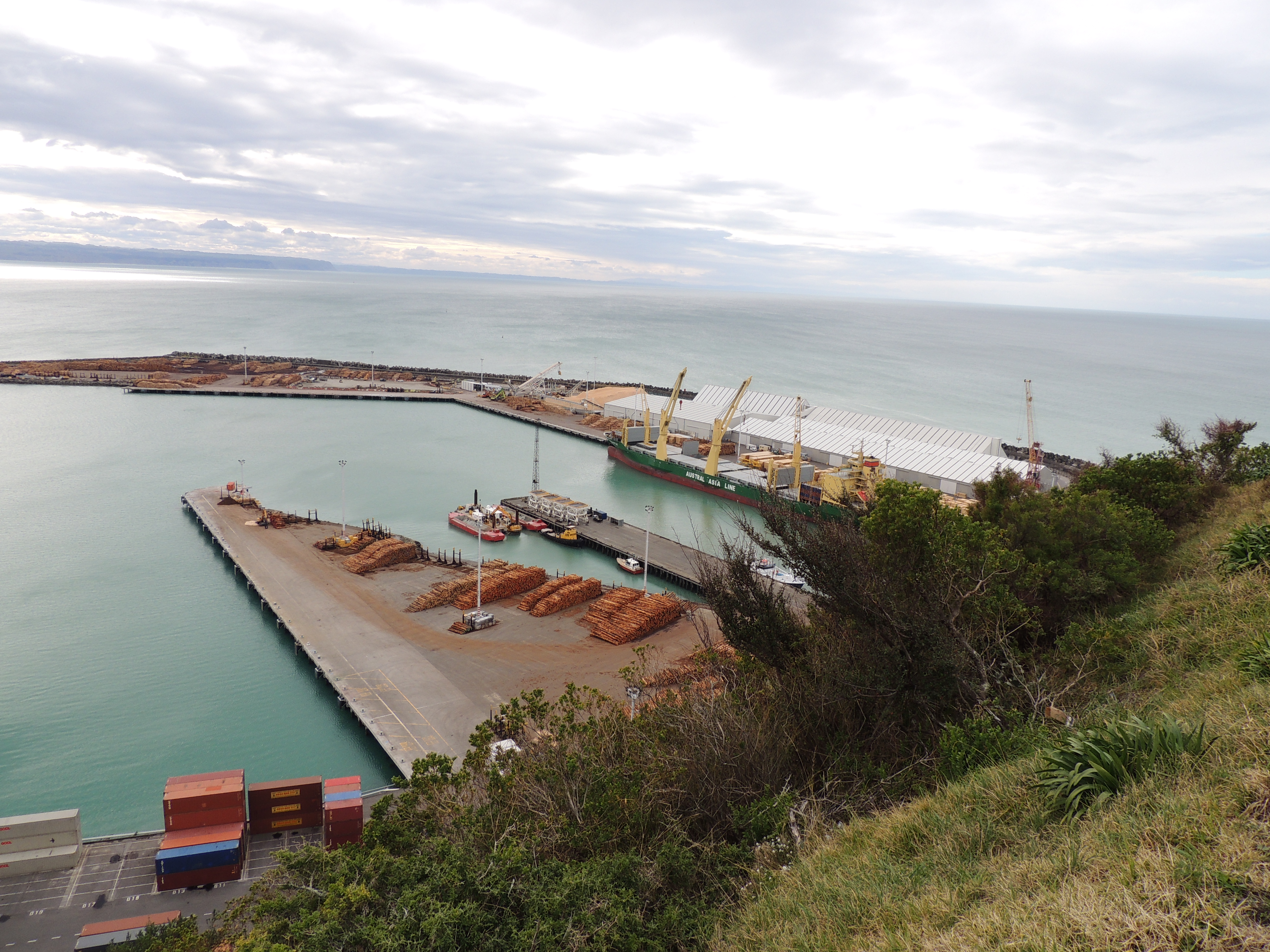
- Port of Napier as seen from Bluff Hill
- Interactive map of Napier Hill
- Coordinates: 39.479749°S 176.910528°E
- Country: New Zealand
- City: Napier
- Local authority: Napier City Council
- Electoral ward: Ahuriri Ward

Area
  - Land: 339 ha (840 acres)

Population (June 2025)
  - Total: 5,460
  - Density: 1,610/km^{2} (4,170/sq mi)

| Ahuriri | (Hawke Bay) | Napier Port |
| Pandora | Napier Hill | (Hawke Bay) |
| Onekawa | Napier South; Marewa | Central Napier |

Napier Hill (Māori: Mataruahou) is a limestone outcrop and suburb rising above the lowland districts of the city of Napier on New Zealand's North Island.

The north-east end, Bluff Hill, has a steep cliff face overlooking the Port of Napier. It features Napier Girls' High School, the historic former Napier Prison and a scenic walk.

The western end, Hospital Hill, was the site of the former Napier Hospital, whose services were transferred to Hawke's Bay Hospital in Hastings in 1999. The building was demolished in 2015 after years of sitting derelict and the land has recently been purchased (December 2020) by the Napier City Council to be developed for use as a new reservoir to replace the current ageing water source on Enfield Road. European settlement on the hill began in 1855. Most homes on the hill were built in the 1920s.

Napier Botanical Gardens were established in the 1860s, and were for a long time the only public park in the city.

Prior to the 1931 Hawke's Bay earthquake, the hill was almost surrounded with water, with just two shingle spits running north and south, and was known as Scinde Island. The earthquake raised the Napier area and the sea receded from around the island and the spits. Scinde Island was named after the province of Sindh, then in India and now in Pakistan. The Napier soccer club Scindians derived their name from Scinde Island.

== Demographics ==
Napier Hill covers 3.39 km^{2} (1.31 sq mi) and had an estimated population of 5,460 as of June 2025, with a population density of 1,611 people per km^{2}.

Historical population
| Year | Pop. | ±% p.a. |
|---|---|---|
| 2006 | 5,400 | — |
| 2013 | 5,253 | −0.39% |
| 2018 | 5,502 | +0.93% |
| 2023 | 5,427 | −0.27% |

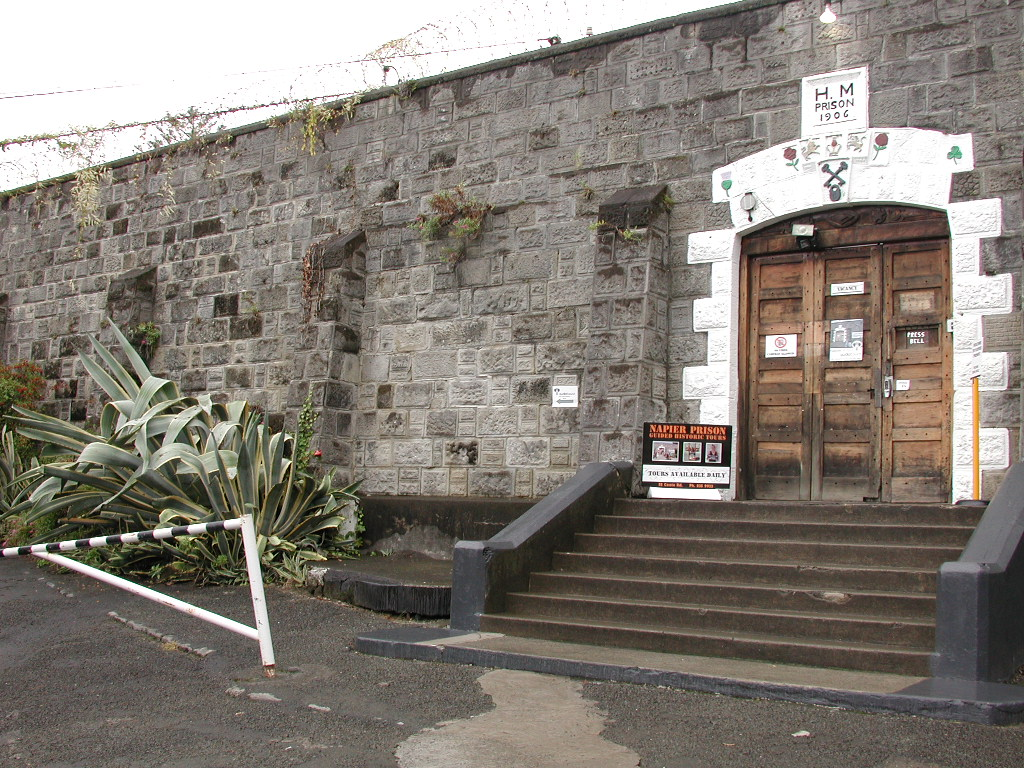
Entrance to Napier Prison

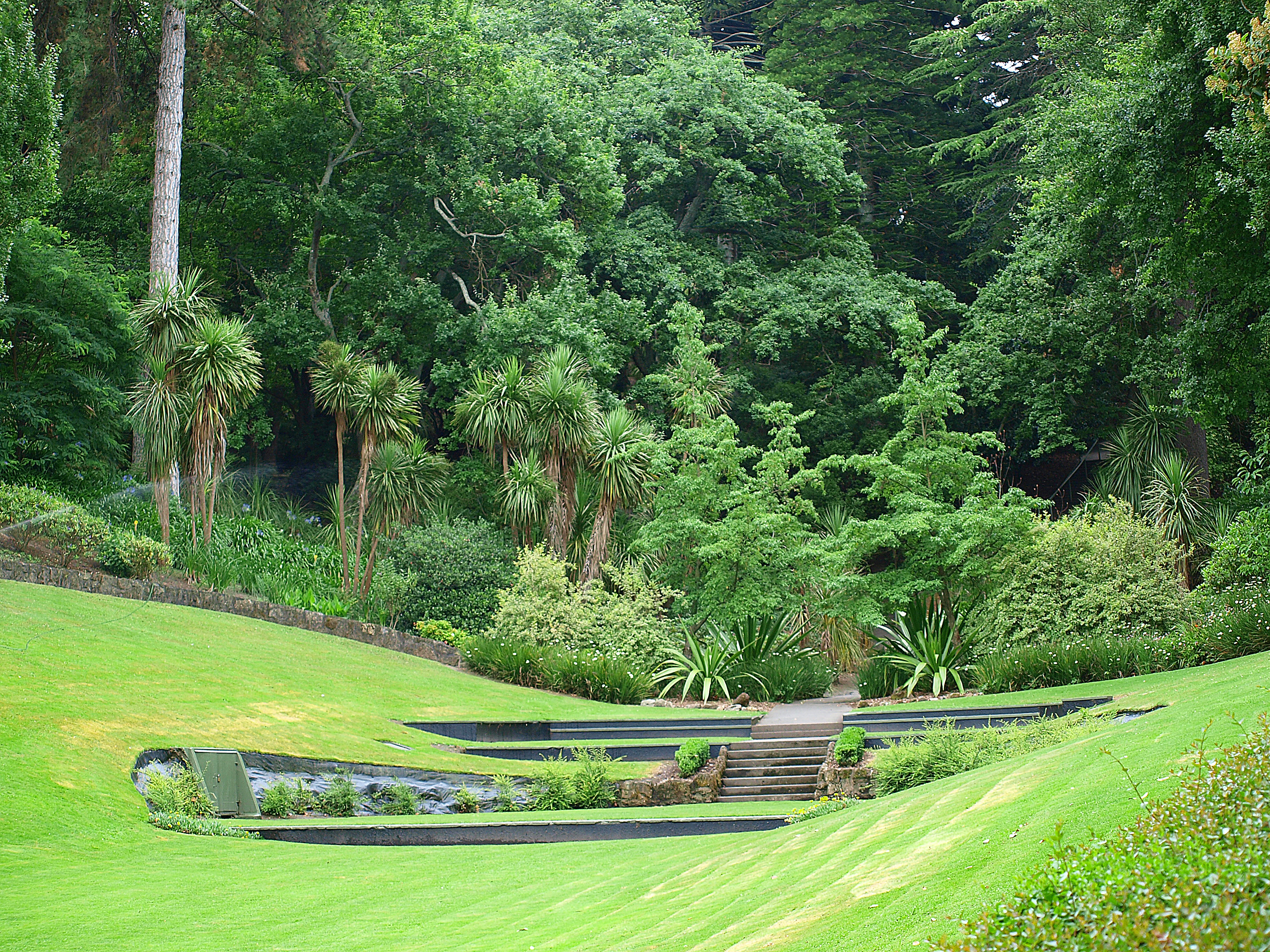
Napier Botanical Gardens

Napier Hill had a population of 5,427 in the 2023 New Zealand census, a decrease of 75 people (−1.4%) since the 2018 census, and an increase of 174 people (3.3%) since the 2013 census. There were 2,655 males, 2,745 females, and 27 people of other genders in 2,319 dwellings. 3.6% of people identified as LGBTIQ+. There were 780 people (14.4%) aged under 15 years, 810 (14.9%) aged 15 to 29, 2,628 (48.4%) aged 30 to 64, and 1,209 (22.3%) aged 65 or older.

People could identify as more than one ethnicity. The results were 89.4% European (Pākehā); 13.3% Māori; 1.7% Pasifika; 4.4% Asian; 1.5% Middle Eastern, Latin American and African New Zealanders (MELAA); and 3.3% other, which includes people giving their ethnicity as "New Zealander". English was spoken by 98.1%, Māori by 3.2%, Samoan by 0.1%, and other languages by 11.4%. No language could be spoken by 1.3% (e.g. too young to talk). New Zealand Sign Language was known by 0.4%. The percentage of people born overseas was 24.4, compared with 28.8% nationally.

Religious affiliations were 30.6% Christian, 0.7% Hindu, 0.3% Islam, 0.8% Māori religious beliefs, 0.6% Buddhist, 0.6% New Age, 0.3% Jewish, and 1.7% other religions. People who answered that they had no religion were 58.2%, and 6.4% of people did not answer the census question.

Of those at least 15 years old, 1,650 (35.5%) people had a bachelor's or higher degree, 2,292 (49.3%) had a post-high school certificate or diploma, and 708 (15.2%) people exclusively held high school qualifications. 777 people (16.7%) earned over $100,000 compared to 12.1% nationally. The employment status of those at least 15 was 2,367 (50.9%) full-time, 711 (15.3%) part-time, and 126 (2.7%) unemployed.

Individual statistical areas
| Name | Area (km^{2}) | Population | Density (per km^{2}) | Dwellings | Median age | Median income |
|---|---|---|---|---|---|---|
| Bluff Hill | 1.89 | 2,631 | 1,392 | 1,131 | 49.4 years | $46,500 |
| Hospital Hill | 1.50 | 2,796 | 1,864 | 1,188 | 47.8 years | $46,800 |
| New Zealand | | | | | 38.1 years | $41,500 |

== Education ==
Bluff Hill and Hospital Hill have three schools:

- Napier Central School is a co-educational Year 1-6 state primary school, with a roll of 253 as of July 2026. It opened in 1879 as Main School, but burnt down in 1916. A new school opened in 1920. The 1931 Hawke's Bay earthquake destroyed the school's brick buildings but it was rebuilt in a few months.
- Napier Girls' High School is a single-sex Year 9-13 state high school, with a roll of 1,028 as of July 2026. It opened in 1884.
- Sacred Heart College is a single-sex Year 9-13 girls' state-integrated high school, with a roll of 354 as of July 2026. It opened in 1867, and was upgraded and extended in the 1990s. A fire destroyed some properties in 2001. Further upgrades took place in 2009.

Residents also use two nearby schools:

- Napier Intermediate, a co-educational state intermediate school, with a roll of 362, provides intermediate education.
- Napier Boys' High School, a single-sex state school, with a roll of 1,296.
