= Donald River =

Donald River may refer to:

- Donald River (Hawke's Bay), a river in the Hawke's Bay region of New Zealand
- Donald River (West Coast), a short tributary of the Waiatoto River, New Zealand
