= Clive Square =

Urban square in Napier, New Zealand

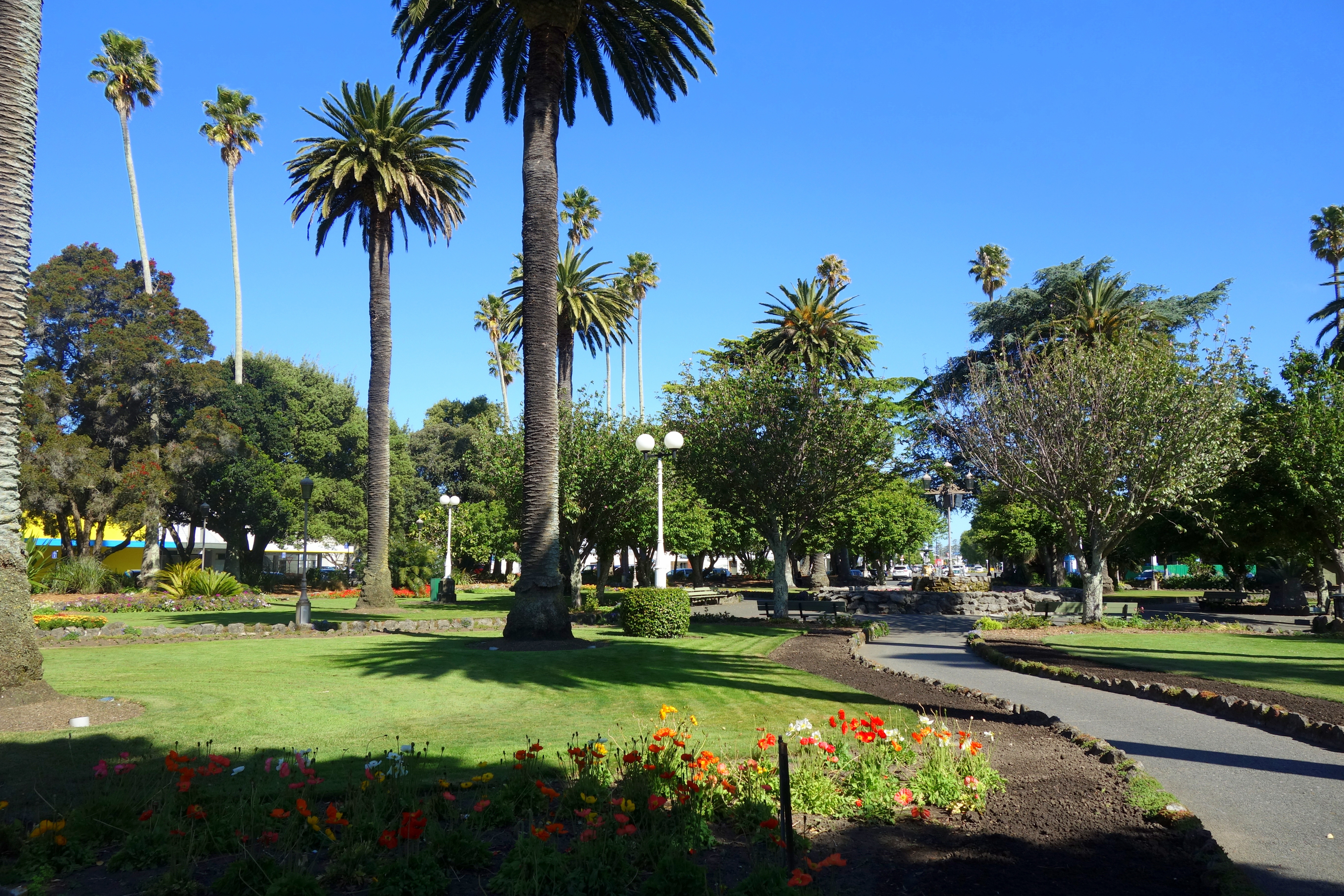
- Clive Square, Napier
- Interactive map of Clive Square
- Type: Town square
- Location: Napier, New Zealand
- Coordinates: 39°29′31″S 176°54′49″E
- Created: 1854
- Operator: Napier City Council

Clive Square is a central city park and recreation space in the city of Napier, New Zealand.

== History ==
The park was inaugurated in 1854 with the intention of re-creating the look of an English village green, and was the city's main sports ground during the city's early decades. This initial concept was later abandoned, replaced by a garden and woodland space which was begun in 1886.

Today's park features numerous palm trees of several species and has as its central feature a large lily pond which is home to goldfish. A carillon, gifted to the city on its centennial in 1974 by tobacco company Rothmans Tobacco Company, is located in the square and plays daily.

A historic structure, the Blythe Memorial Fountain, sits just inside the square's southern entrance. This is a memorial to William Robert Blythe (1841-1903), who was a leading proponent of turning the sports ground into a horticultural garden. The fountain, installed in the year following Blythe's death, has a Heritage New Zealand Category 2 Historic Place classification.

Napier's main war memorial, Memorial Square, sits immediately to the north of Clive Square, and contains the city's World War I cenotaph.

== Gallery ==
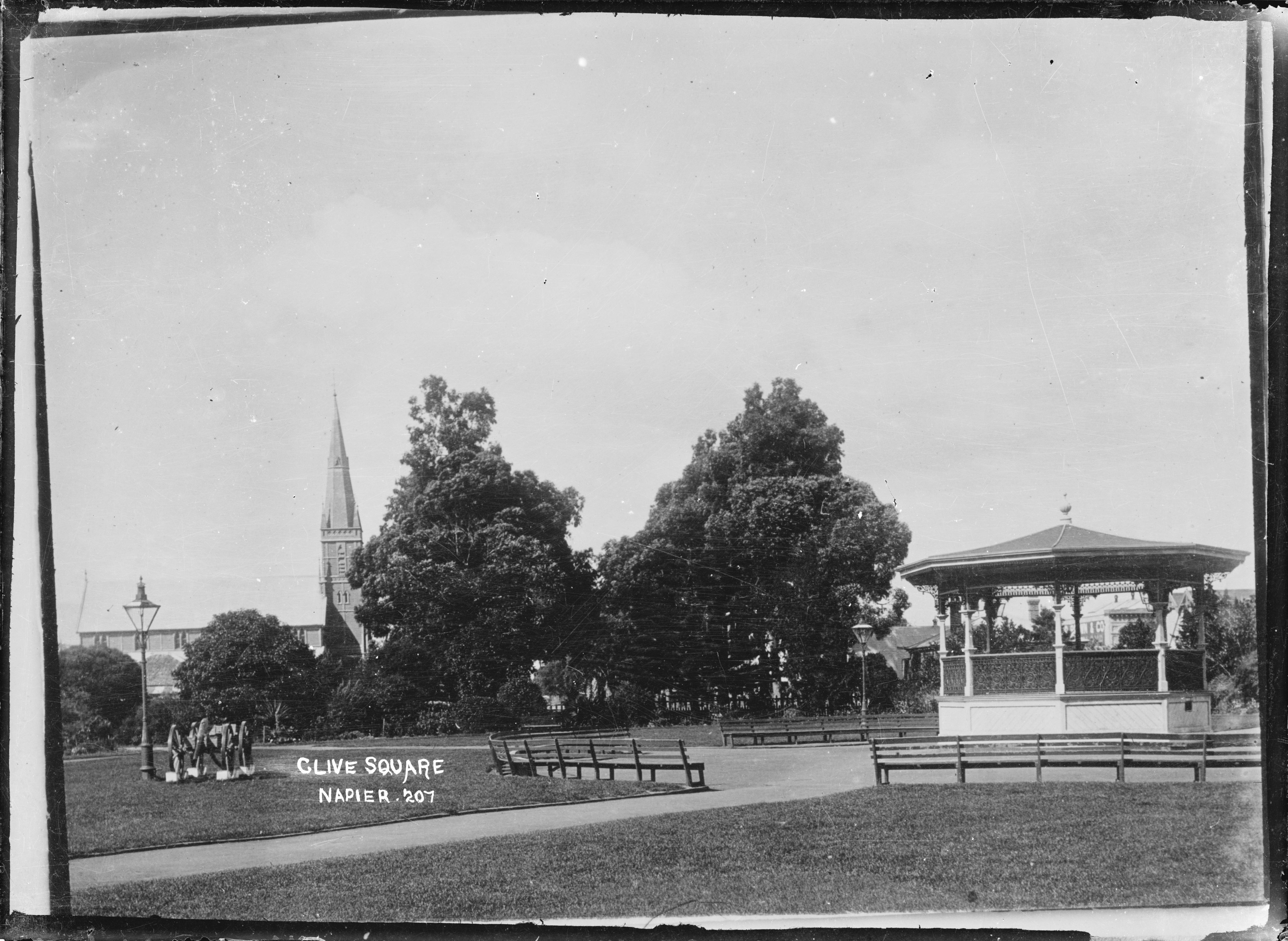
Clive Square, Napier, circa 1910

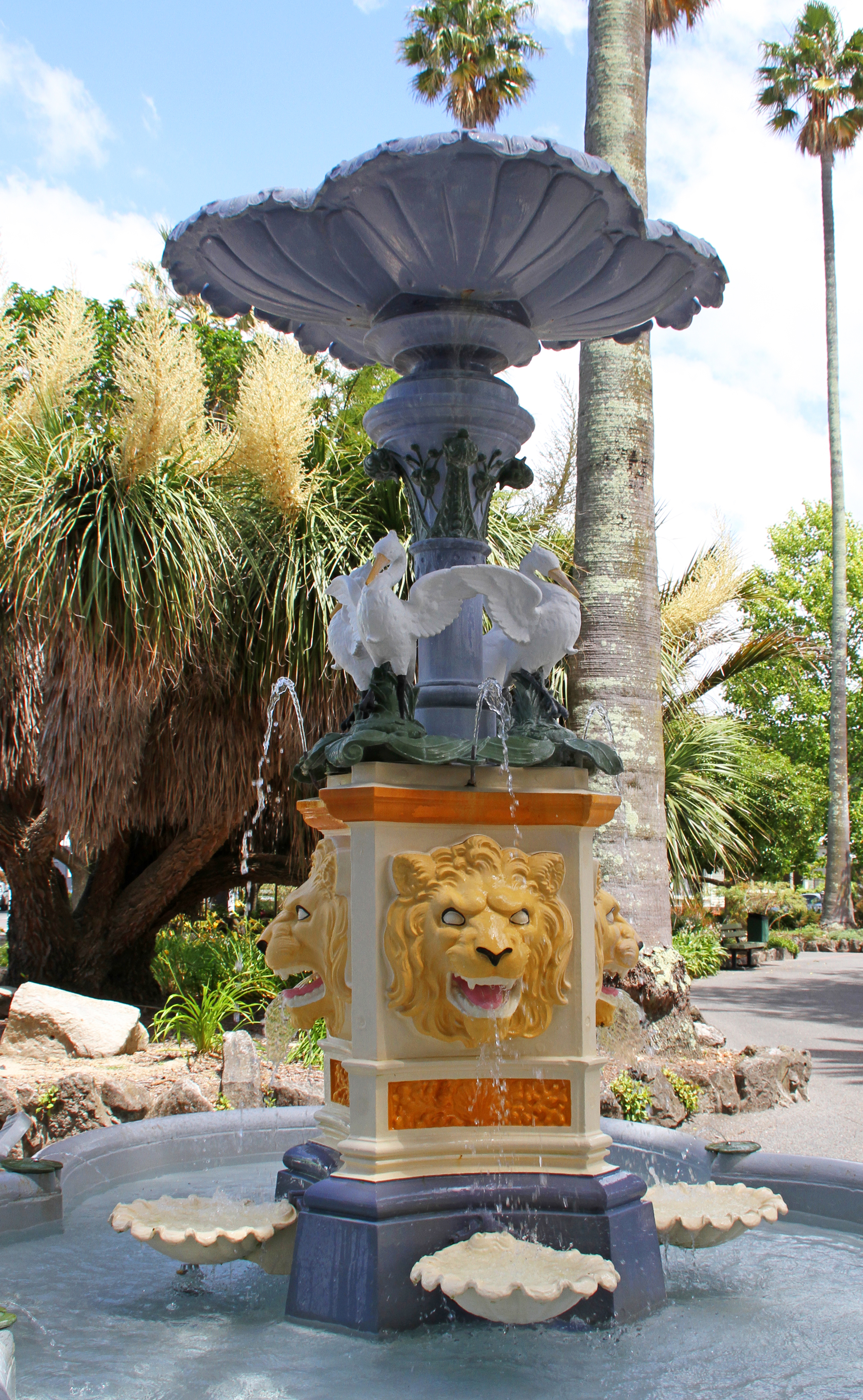
Blythe Memorial Fountain

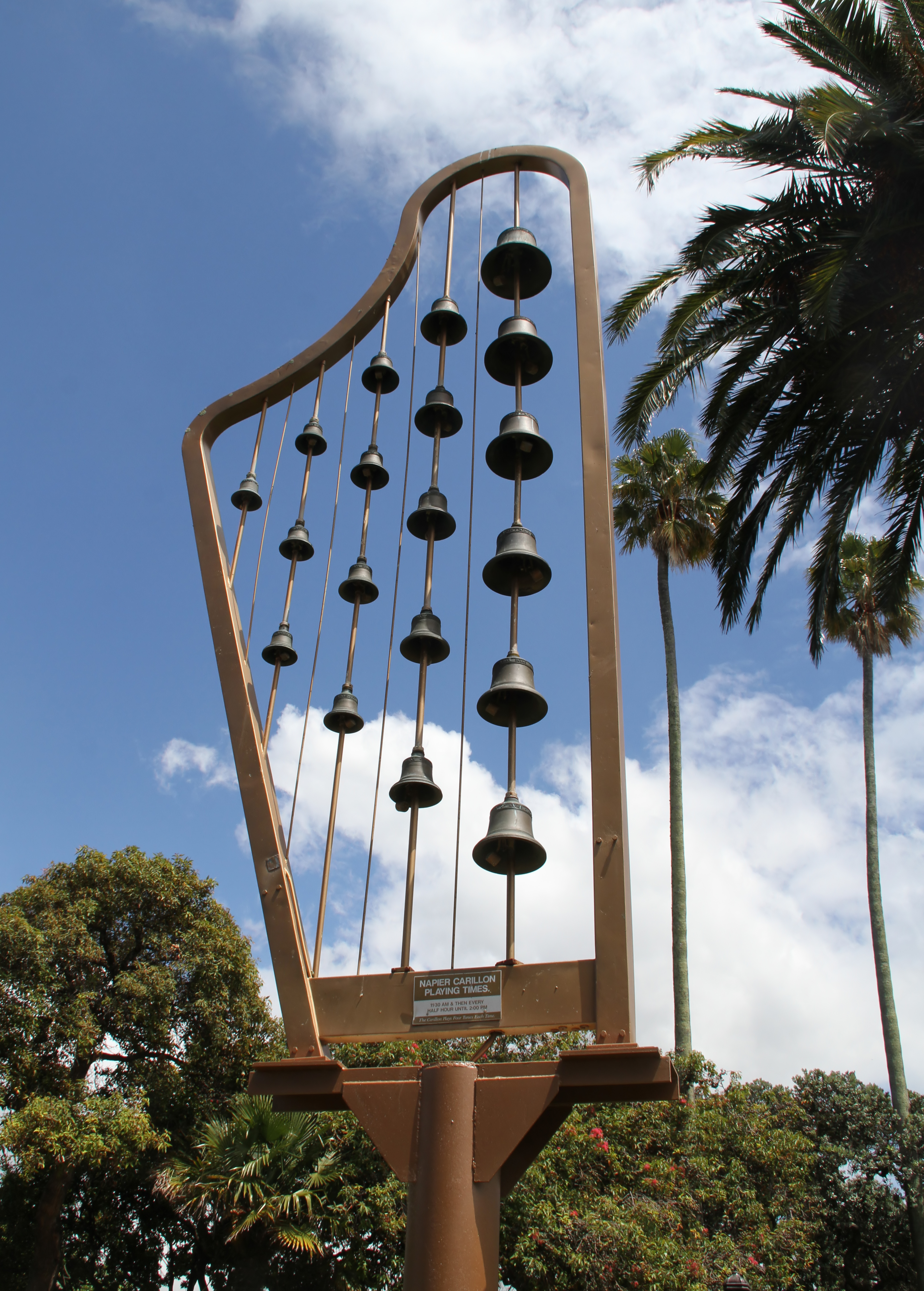
Napier Carillon, Clive Gardens
