= Onekawa =

Suburb of Napier, New Zealand

- Suburb
- Interactive map of Onekawa
- Coordinates: 39.5084°S 176.8902°E
- Country: New Zealand
- City: Napier
- Local authority: Napier City Council
- Electoral ward: Onekawa-Tamatea Ward; Nelson Park Ward

Area
  - Land: 565 ha (1,400 acres)

Population (June 2025)
  - Total: 7,080
  - Density: 1,250/km^{2} (3,250/sq mi)

Bay View	Westshore	Ahuriri
Poraiti; Tamatea	Onekawa	Napier Hill; Marewa; Maraenui
Pirimai	Meeanee	Awatoto

Onekawa is a suburb of the city of Napier, in the Hawke's Bay Region of the eastern North Island of New Zealand. Development of the suburb began in the late 1940s, after the land was acquired from the Harbour Board.

The New Zealand Ministry for Culture and Heritage gives a translation of "salty soil" for Onekawa.

The area was raised out of Ahuriri Lagoon by the 1931 Hawke's Bay earthquake.

Onekawa houses a high proportion of industry trade businesses.

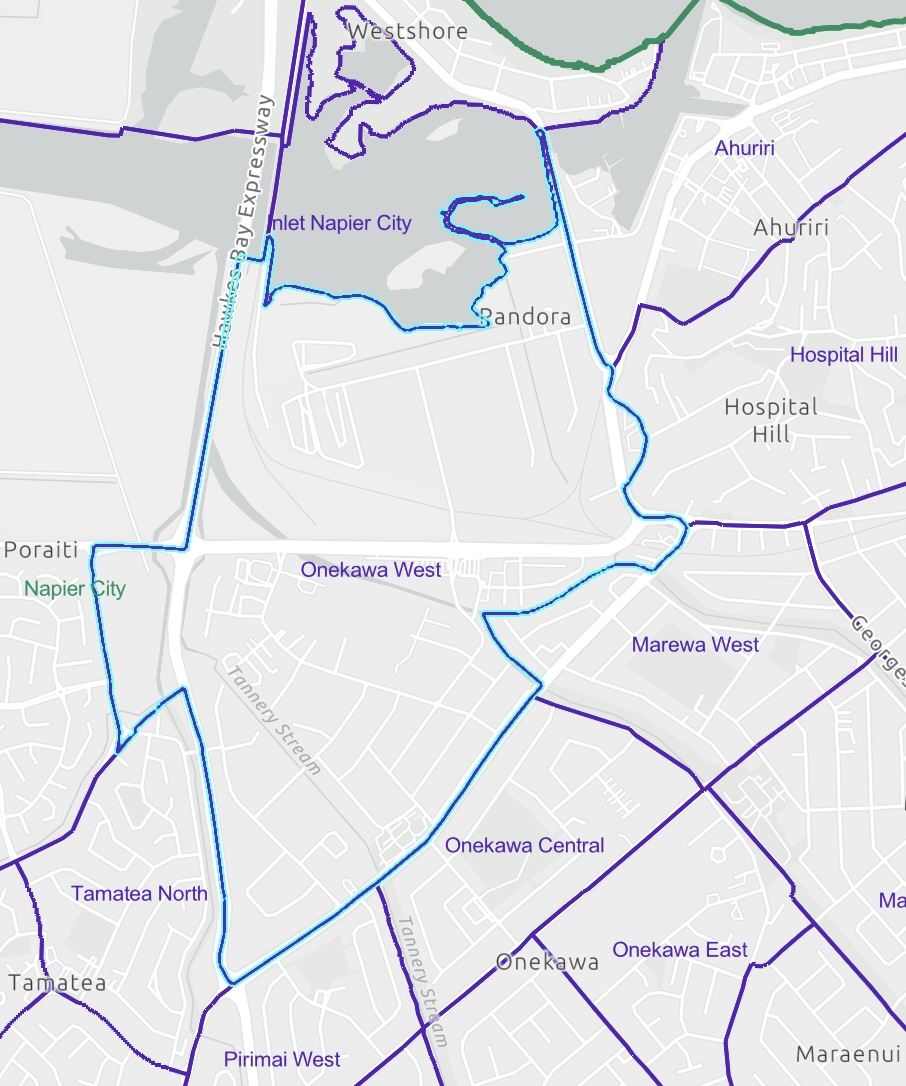
Onekawa West Statistical Area 2

== Pandora ==
Pandora Industrial Zone is in the northern part of the Onekawa West statistical area, off Pandora Road. Its eastern boundary follows the coastline as mapped in 1870, which included Hope, Pandora and Battery Points. Between 1876 and 1879 Napier Harbour Board used spoil from Bluff Hill and Pandora Point to fill in part of Ahuriri Lagoon. In 1911 more was removed to widen Hyderabad Road and the spoil used to fill a lagoon at the bottom of Park Road and one behind the Harbour Board’s office, to allow a road to link Waghorne Street to Battery Road. A quarry was formed in the 1920s and slips at the Point occurred during the 1931 earthquake and in aftershocks. Pandora Point was further removed in 1946 to straighten Hyderabad Road. Pandora Bridge was built in 1961.

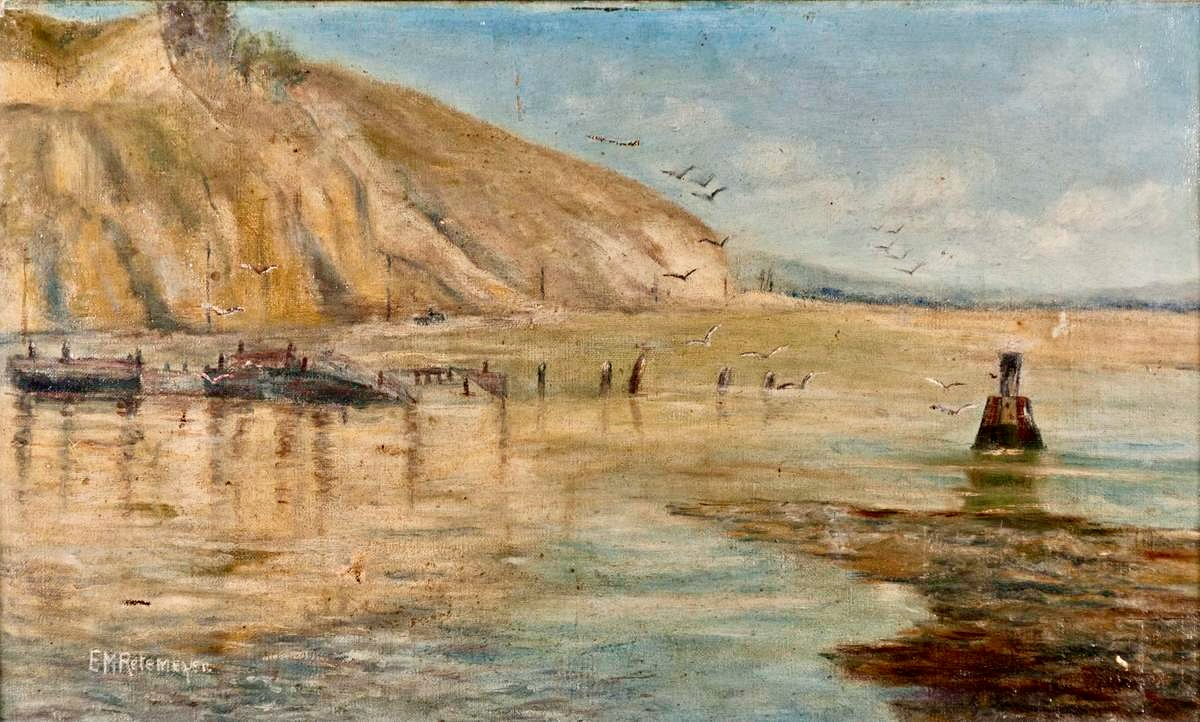
Pandora Point by Emily Mary Retemeyer (1876-1943)

Pandora Pond was named after HMS Pandora, used to survey the coast in 1855. It is a small sheltered, shallow, tidal part of Ahuriri Estuary, partly separated from the main estuary by a sand spit. It is popular for swimming, kayaking, rowing, paddleboarding, sailing and waka ama.

== Demographics ==
Onekawa covers 5.65 km^{2} (2.18 sq mi) and had an estimated population of 7,080 as of June 2025, with a population density of 1,253 people per km^{2}.

Historical population
Year	Pop.	±% p.a.
2006	5,754	—
2013	5,955	+0.49%
2018	6,597	+2.07%
2023	6,855	+0.77%
The 2006 population is for a smaller area of 5.53 km^{2}. Source:

Onekawa had a population of 6,855 in the 2023 New Zealand census, an increase of 258 people (3.9%) since the 2018 census, and an increase of 900 people (15.1%) since the 2013 census. There were 3,381 males, 3,447 females, and 27 people of other genders in 2,427 dwellings. 2.8% of people identified as LGBTIQ+. The median age was 34.0 years (compared with 38.1 years nationally). There were 1,536 people (22.4%) aged under 15 years, 1,440 (21.0%) aged 15 to 29, 2,862 (41.8%) aged 30 to 64, and 1,014 (14.8%) aged 65 or older.

People could identify as more than one ethnicity. The results were 67.0% European (Pākehā); 37.5% Māori; 7.7% Pasifika; 7.7% Asian; 1.0% Middle Eastern, Latin American and African New Zealanders (MELAA); and 2.2% other, which includes people giving their ethnicity as "New Zealander". English was spoken by 95.8%, Māori by 9.6%, Samoan by 2.5%, and other languages by 7.2%. No language could be spoken by 2.3% (e.g. too young to talk). New Zealand Sign Language was known by 0.8%. The percentage of people born overseas was 15.9, compared with 28.8% nationally.

Religious affiliations were 28.4% Christian, 1.4% Hindu, 0.4% Islam, 4.7% Māori religious beliefs, 0.8% Buddhist, 0.7% New Age, 0.1% Jewish, and 1.6% other religions. People who answered that they had no religion were 54.7%, and 7.4% of people did not answer the census question.

Of those at least 15 years old, 753 (14.2%) people had a bachelor's or higher degree, 2,964 (55.7%) had a post-high school certificate or diploma, and 1,602 (30.1%) people exclusively held high school qualifications. The median income was $36,300, compared with $41,500 nationally. 252 people (4.7%) earned over $100,000 compared to 12.1% nationally. The employment status of those at least 15 was 2,619 (49.2%) full-time, 654 (12.3%) part-time, and 240 (4.5%) unemployed.

Individual statistical areas
Name	Area (km^{2})	Population	Density (per km^{2})	Dwellings	Median age	Median income
Onekawa West	3.11	225	72	147	57.6 years	$40,500
Onekawa Central	0.68	1,563	2,299	582	38.5 years	$41,400
Onekawa East	0.64	1,722	2,691	660	34.4 years	$30,900
Onekawa South	1.23	3,345	2,720	1,041	31.3 years	$36,900
New Zealand					38.1 years	$41,500

== Marae ==
The local Pukemokimoki marae is a marae (meeting ground) for the iwi (tribe) of Ngāti Kahungunu and its hapū (sub-tribe) of Ngā Hau E Whā, and includes the wharenui (meeting house) of Omio.

== Education ==
Onekawa School is a state primary school for Years 1 to 6, with a roll of 356. It opened after 1949 and before 1954.

Henry Hill School is a state primary school for Years 1 to 6, with a roll of 276. It opened in 1963. In 2002, Pirimai School merged with Henry Hill.

St Patrick's School is a state-integrated Catholic primary school for Years 1 to 8, with a roll of 268. It opened in 1878 as a Marist Brothers school for boys, and merged with Sisters of our Lady of the Missions in the 1980s to become co-educational.

William Colenso College is a state secondary school for Years 7 to 13, with a roll of 377. Hawke's Bay School for Teenage Parents is a teenage parenting facility within the college. The college was formed by a merger of Colenso High School (opened in 1959) and Wycliffe Intermediate School (opened in 1960) in 2004.

Te Kura Kaupapa Māori o Te Ara Hou is a Kura Kaupapa Māori immersion school for Years 1 to 13, with a roll of 239. It opened in 2002.

All these schools are co-educational. Rolls are as of October 2025.
