= Donald River (Hawke's Bay) =

River in New Zealand

- Route of the Donald River
- Mouth of the Donald River Donald River (Hawke's Bay) (North Island)

Location
- Country: New Zealand
- Island: North Island
- Region: Hawke's Bay
- District: Hastings

Physical characteristics
- Source: Kaweka J
  - location: Kaweka Range
  - coordinates: 39.28326°S 176.38485°E
- Mouth: Tūtaekurī River
  - coordinates: 39°22′11″S 176°26′07″E
  - elevation: 354 m (1,161 ft)
- Length: 41 km (25 mi)

Basin features
- Progression: Donald River → Tūtaekurī River → Ngaruroro River → Hawke Bay → Pacific Ocean
- Tributaries
  - left: Ngaherenui Stream, Jap Creek, Cable Creek
  - right: Coxcomb Stream

The Donald River is a river in the Hawke's Bay region of New Zealand. It flows southeast from the Kaweka Ranges in the Kaweka Forest Park, reaching the Tūtaekurī River 20 kilometres (12 mi) west of Napier.

== Recreation ==
The New Zealand Department of Conservation maintains a tramping track alongside the river.
