= Napier Prison =

Former prison in New Zealand

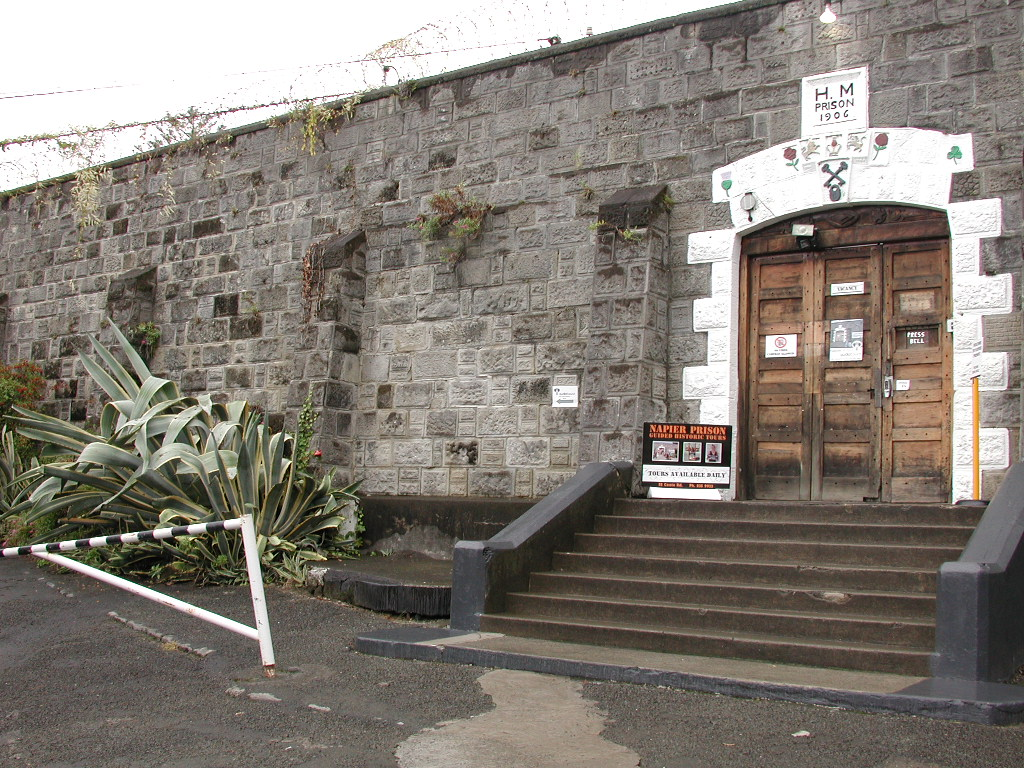
- Entrance to the prison building, 2010
- Interactive map of Napier Prison
- Location: Napier, New Zealand; 39.4847°S 176.9188°E
- Status: decommissioned
- Opened: 1862
- Closed: 1993

Heritage New Zealand – Category 1
- Official name: New Plymouth Prison
- Designated: 1 September 1983
- Reference no.: 181

Napier Prison is a former prison in Napier, New Zealand. Built in 1862 and decommissioned as a prison in 1993, it is the country's oldest prison complex. It currently operates as a visitor attraction and museum.

== History ==
Napier Prison was constructed on Napier Hill in 1862 and was used until the early 1990s, being officially decommissioned in 1993. In addition to being a prison, the location was also used as an orphanage and a psychiatric unit. During the 19th century, four hangings were conducted at the prison. John Purcell was superintendent of the prison in its latter years.

== Tourist attraction ==
In 2002, the prison was opened as a historical tourist attraction. It is open for entertainment and tours. The prison offers guided day and night tours by appointment and self-guided audio tours all day. It is the only building where it is possible to see the original path of the 1931 Hawke's Bay earthquake.

The prison was used as the venue for the filming of the 2006 television show Redemption Hill. It is also featured in documentary series "Off the Rails".

There have been many reports of ghostly occurrences at the site, such as unexplained footsteps, disembodied faces, doors opening and closing on their own, and the ghost of a murderer appearing on the anniversary of his execution. The ghost is thought to be that of mass-murderer Roland Edwards. Paranormal activity is reputedly more prevalent around the 15 July anniversary of his death. Prolific New Zealand-based paranormal research team Haunted Auckland have made several visits to the prison, conducting detailed overnight investigations, in the hopes of documenting evidence to back up some of the reports. In 2011, a team from the television series Ghost Hunters International spent four days filming at the prison, leading to the show being criticised as being "the lowest common denominator of a reality TV show".
