= Maraenui =

Suburb of Napier, New Zealand

- Suburb
- Interactive map of Maraenui
- Coordinates: 39.517220°S 176.901394°E
- Country: New Zealand
- City: Napier
- Local authority: Napier City Council
- Electoral ward: Nelson Park

Area
  - Land: 105 ha (260 acres)

Population (June 2025)
  - Total: 3,900
  - Density: 3,700/km^{2} (9,600/sq mi)

| Onekawa | Marewa |
| | Maraenui |
| | Meeanee | Te Awa |

Maraenui is a suburb of the city of Napier, in the Hawke's Bay region of New Zealand's eastern North Island. The New Zealand Ministry for Culture and Heritage gives a translation of "great marae" for Maraenui.

It is a lower socio-economic neighbourhood with a mix of owner occupied and state-owned Housing New Zealand properties, and has a high rate of synthetic drug use.

== Pukemokimoki Marae ==
Pukemokimoki Marae, on Riverbend Road, opened on 6 October 2007. It is an urban marae, named after a hill with a former pā site and the only place in Hawke's Bay where the scented mokimoki fern grew. The hill, on a site now bounded by Carlyle, Thackeray and Faraday Streets, was removed in 1872 to make way for the railway. Spoil from the hill was used to fill low areas in Maraenui.

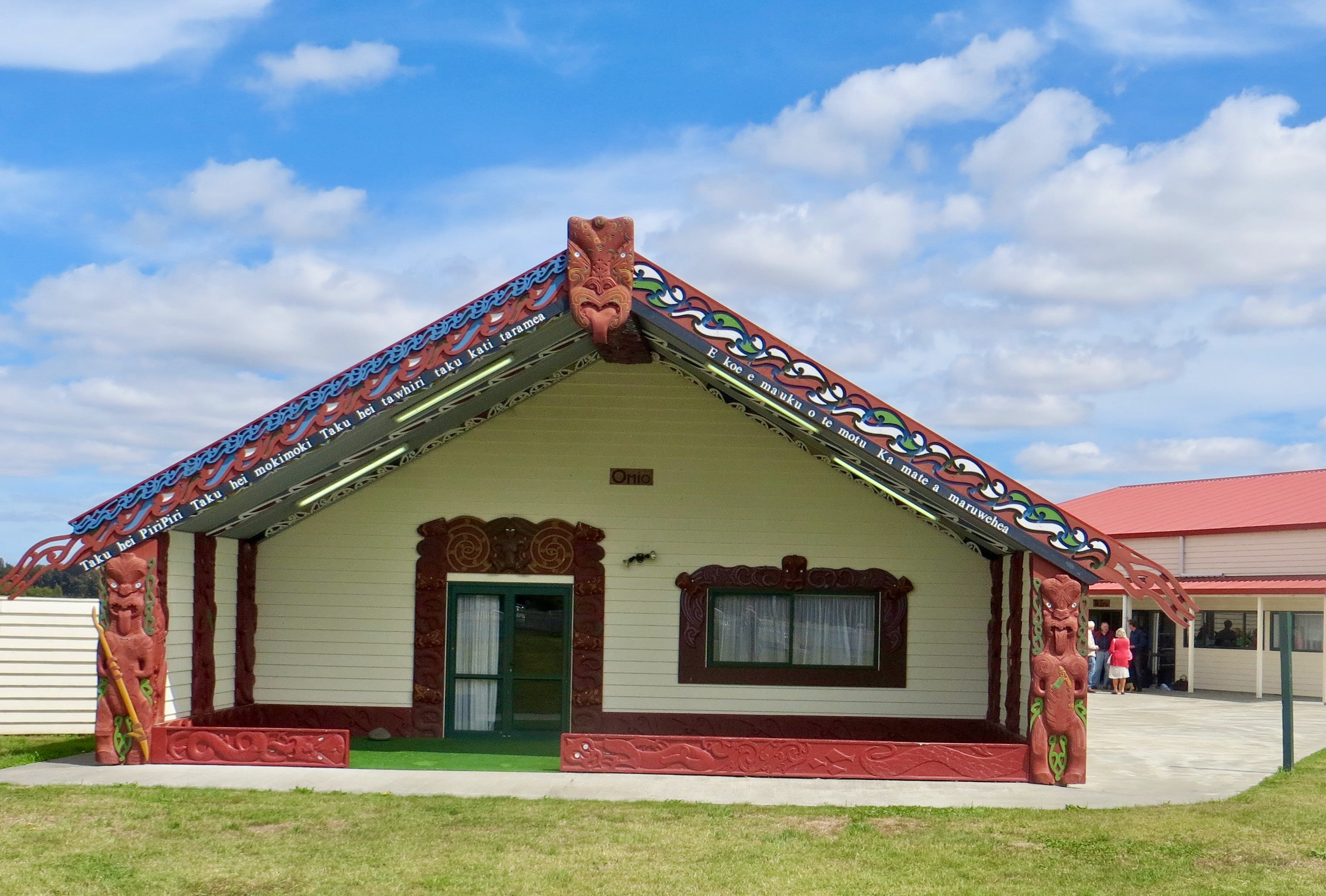
Pukemokimoki Marae

== Demographics ==
Maraenui covers 1.05 km^{2} (0.41 sq mi) and had an estimated population of 3,900 as of June 2025, with a population density of 3,714 people per km^{2}.

Historical population
| Year | Pop. | ±% p.a. |
|---|---|---|
| 2006 | 3,537 | — |
| 2013 | 3,093 | −1.90% |
| 2018 | 3,504 | +2.53% |
| 2023 | 3,780 | +1.53% |

Maraenui had a population of 3,780 in the 2023 New Zealand census, an increase of 276 people (7.9%) since the 2018 census, and an increase of 687 people (22.2%) since the 2013 census. There were 1,875 males, 1,884 females, and 18 people of other genders in 1,047 dwellings. 2.7% of people identified as LGBTIQ+. The median age was 28.7 years (compared with 38.1 years nationally). There were 1,020 people (27.0%) aged under 15 years, 945 (25.0%) aged 15 to 29, 1,491 (39.4%) aged 30 to 64, and 321 (8.5%) aged 65 or older.

People could identify as more than one ethnicity. The results were 50.2% European (Pākehā); 58.5% Māori; 14.2% Pasifika; 3.7% Asian; 0.4% Middle Eastern, Latin American and African New Zealanders (MELAA); and 1.3% other, which includes people giving their ethnicity as "New Zealander". English was spoken by 94.4%, Māori by 17.6%, Samoan by 7.9%, and other languages by 3.6%. No language could be spoken by 2.8% (e.g. too young to talk). New Zealand Sign Language was known by 1.1%. The percentage of people born overseas was 12.1, compared with 28.8% nationally.

Religious affiliations were 25.3% Christian, 0.6% Hindu, 0.1% Islam, 11.3% Māori religious beliefs, 0.3% Buddhist, 0.7% New Age, 0.1% Jewish, and 1.3% other religions. People who answered that they had no religion were 55.4%, and 5.3% of people did not answer the census question.

Of those at least 15 years old, 183 (6.6%) people had a bachelor's or higher degree, 1,506 (54.6%) had a post-high school certificate or diploma, and 1,062 (38.5%) people exclusively held high school qualifications. The median income was $33,200, compared with $41,500 nationally. 57 people (2.1%) earned over $100,000 compared to 12.1% nationally. The employment status of those at least 15 was 1,302 (47.2%) full-time, 303 (11.0%) part-time, and 171 (6.2%) unemployed.

== Education ==
Maraenui Bilingual School is a co-educational state primary school, with a roll of 127 as of July 2026. The school provides education in both Māori language and English. The school opened in 1958, and became New Zealand's first bilingual school in 1988.

Richmond School is a co-educational state primary school, with a roll of 67 as of July 2026.
