= Central Napier =

Central business district of Napier, New Zealand

- Suburb
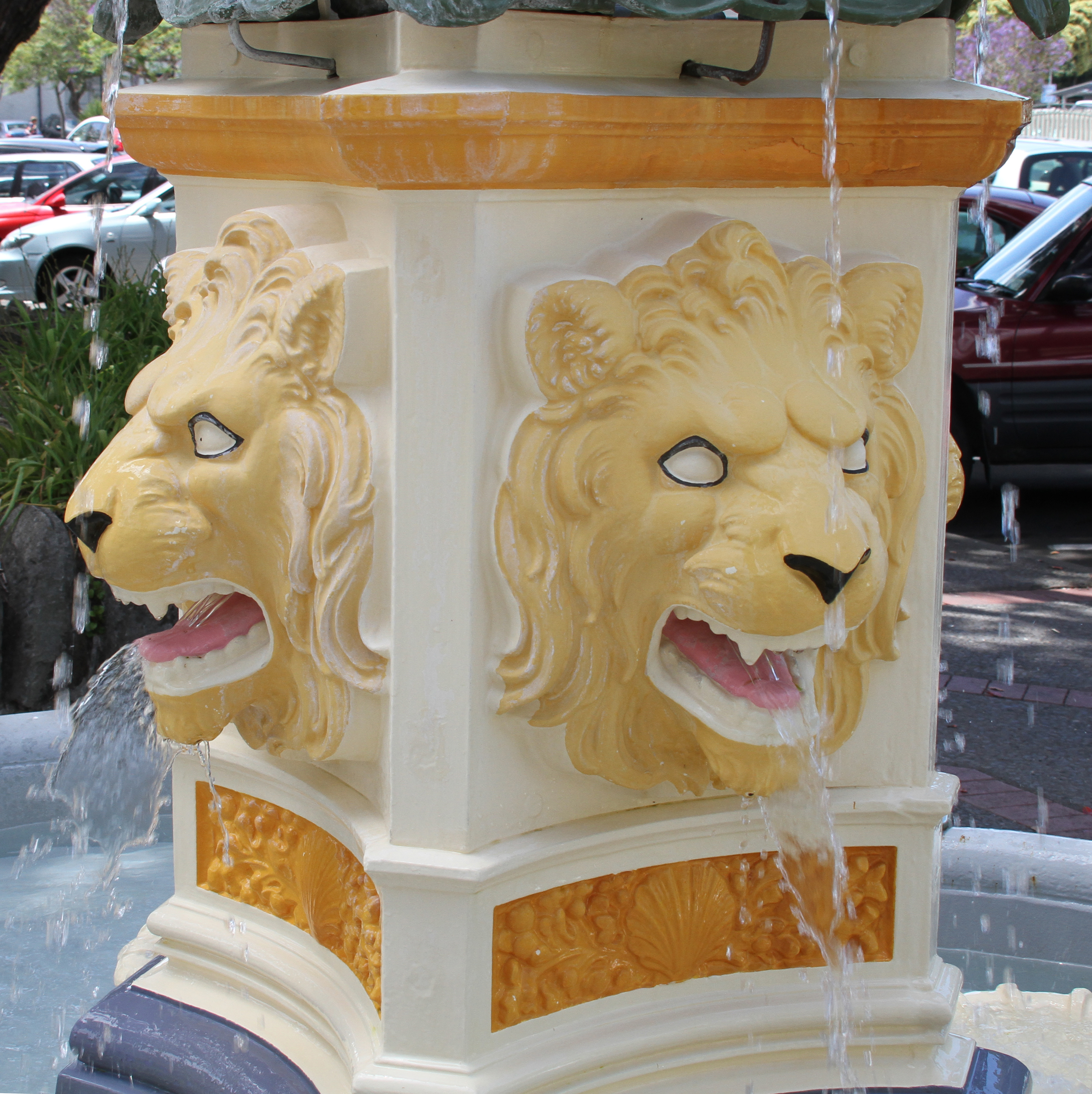
- Blythe Memorial Fountain
- Interactive map of Central Napier
- Coordinates: 39.491875°S 176.913612°E
- Country: New Zealand
- City: Napier
- Local authority: Napier City Council
- Electoral ward: Nelson Park (mostly), Ahuriri

Area
  - Land: 84 ha (210 acres)

Population (June 2025)
  - Total: 410
  - Density: 490/km^{2} (1,300/sq mi)

Hospital Hill	Bluff Hill
	Central Napier	(Hawke Bay)
	Napier South

Central Napier is the central area and business district of Napier, in the Hawke's Bay region of New Zealand's eastern North Island. The main shopping street/downtown area of Napier is Emerson Street. Central Napier enjoys Art Deco style architecture on surrounding buildings in Emerson Street. Most houses were built between 1900 and 2010.

== Economy ==
=== Retail ===
Mid City Plaza opened between 1920 and 1933. It covers 3,177 m^{2}, and had 9 tenants and 20 carparks in May 2019.

Ocean Boulevard Mall opened in 1976. It contained just two tenants and no publicly available carparks in March 2020.

== Demographics ==
Napier Central covers 0.84 km^{2} (0.32 sq mi) and had an estimated population of 410 as of June 2025, with a population density of 488 people per km^{2}.

Historical population
Year	Pop.	±% p.a.
2006	405	—
2013	414	+0.31%
2018	420	+0.29%
2023	384	−1.78%

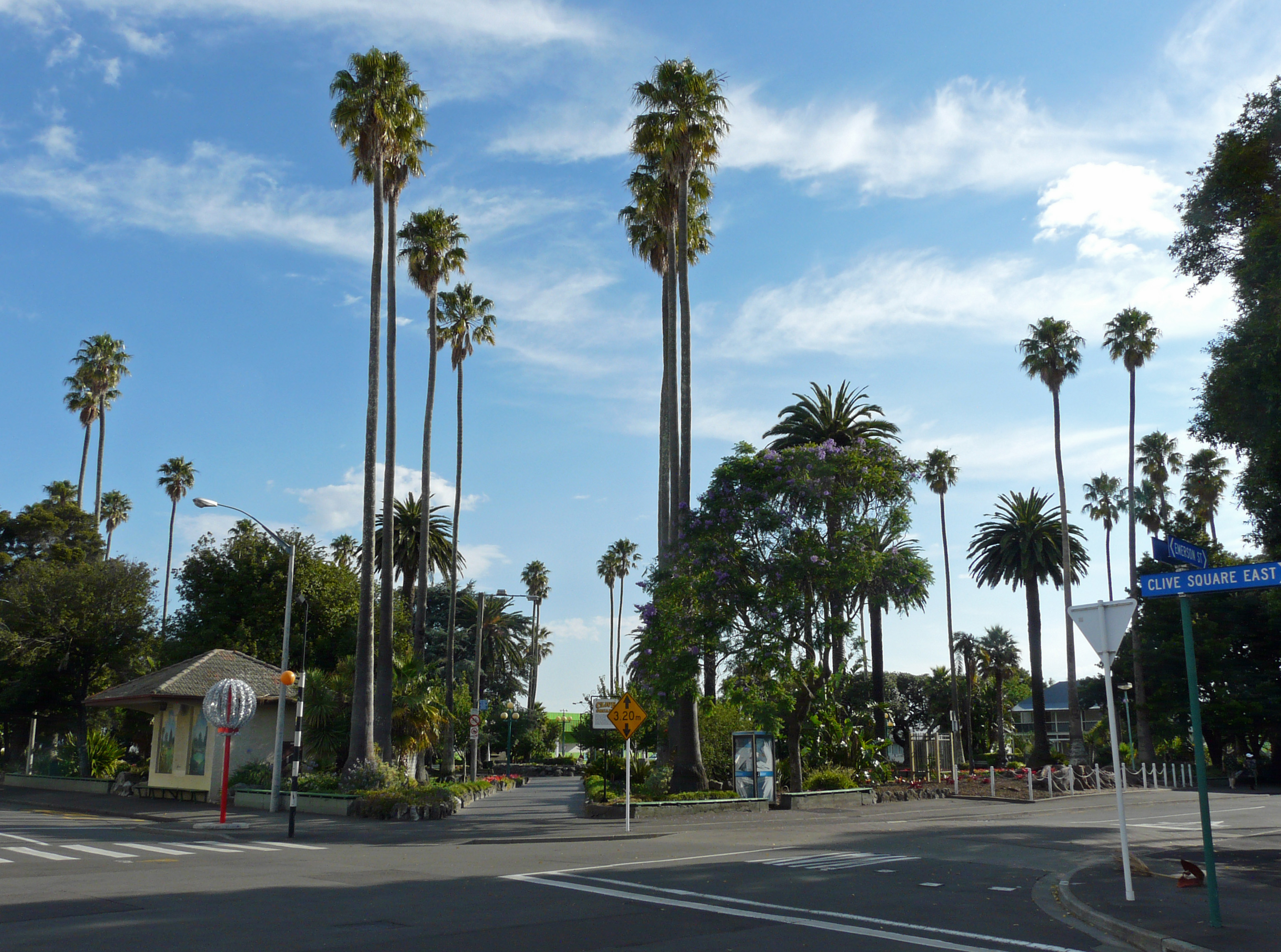
Clive Square

Napier Central had a population of 384 in the 2023 New Zealand census, a decrease of 36 people (−8.6%) since the 2018 census, and a decrease of 30 people (−7.2%) since the 2013 census. There were 213 males, 162 females, and 9 people of other genders in 198 dwellings. 5.5% of people identified as LGBTIQ+. The median age was 38.1 years (compared with 38.1 years nationally). There were 42 people (10.9%) aged under 15 years, 90 (23.4%) aged 15 to 29, 207 (53.9%) aged 30 to 64, and 48 (12.5%) aged 65 or older.

People could identify as more than one ethnicity. The results were 57.8% European (Pākehā), 39.8% Māori, 6.2% Pasifika, 18.0% Asian, and 1.6% other, which includes people giving their ethnicity as "New Zealander". English was spoken by 93.0%, Māori by 7.8%, Samoan by 1.6%, and other languages by 15.6%. No language could be spoken by 1.6% (e.g. too young to talk). New Zealand Sign Language was known by 2.3%. The percentage of people born overseas was 27.3, compared with 28.8% nationally.

Religious affiliations were 25.8% Christian, 3.9% Hindu, 3.1% Māori religious beliefs, 7.0% Buddhist, and 4.7% other religions. People who answered that they had no religion were 53.9%, and 3.1% of people did not answer the census question.

Of those at least 15 years old, 48 (14.0%) people had a bachelor's or higher degree, 177 (51.8%) had a post-high school certificate or diploma, and 120 (35.1%) people exclusively held high school qualifications. The median income was $34,100, compared with $41,500 nationally. 21 people (6.1%) earned over $100,000 compared to 12.1% nationally. The employment status of those at least 15 was 186 (54.4%) full-time, 33 (9.6%) part-time, and 15 (4.4%) unemployed.
