= Nūhaka River =

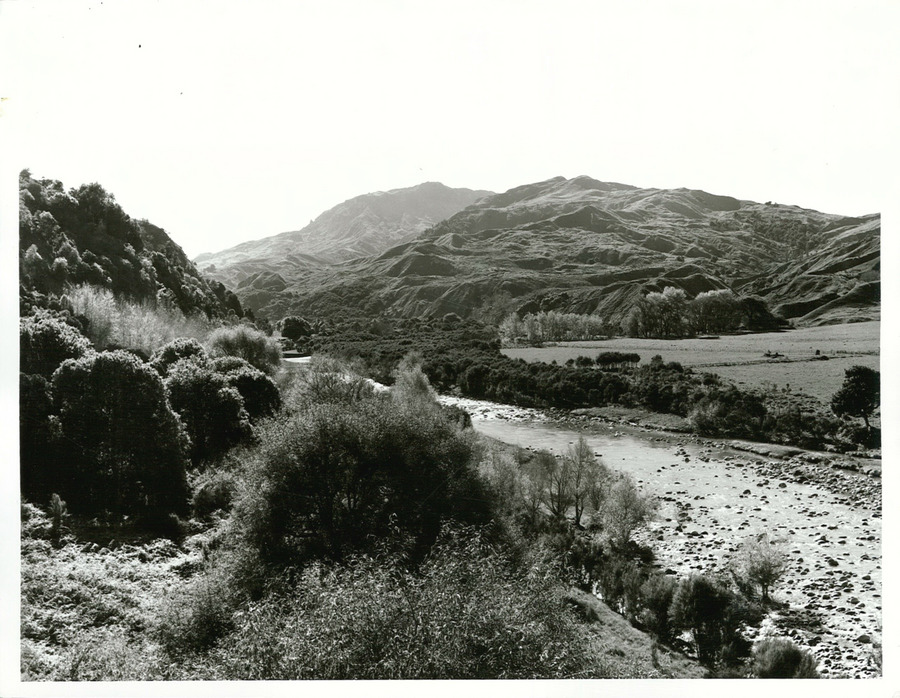
- The Nūhaka River in the Wairoa District in 1976
- Route of the Nūhaka River
- Mouth of the Nūhaka River Nūhaka River (North Island)
- Native name: Nūhaka (Māori)

Location
- Country: New Zealand
- Island: North Island
- Region: Gisborne, Wairoa (Hawke's Bay)

Physical characteristics
- Source: Te Rimuomaru
  - coordinates: 38.8447°S 177.8242°E
- Mouth: Hawke Bay
  - location: Nūhaka
  - coordinates: 39°03′25″S 177°45′05″E
  - elevation: 0 m (0 ft)
- Length: 28 km (17 mi)

Basin features
- Progression: Nūhaka River → Hawke Bay → Pacific Ocean
- Tributaries
  - left: Puninga Stream, Uriroa Stream, Mangahua Stream, Mangatoto Stream, Tunanui Stream, Waimaunu Stream
  - right: Tūtaemātuatua Stream
- Bridges: Rakaipaka Bridge, Nūhaka Bridge

The Nūhaka River is a river of the Gisborne District and Hawke's Bay regions of New Zealand's North Island. It flows generally south from its sources in rough coastal hill country south of Gisborne, reaching the sea at Nūhaka, close to the northern end of Hawke Bay.

== See also ==
- List of rivers of New Zealand
