= Napier City Council =

Local government in New Zealand

Napier City Council Te Kaunihera o Ahuriri
- Coat of arms

- Brand logo

Type
- Type: Territorial authority of Napier
- Term limits: None

History
- Established: 1 November 1989; 37 years ago
- Preceded by: Napier City Council
- New session started: 17 October 2025

Leadership
- Mayor: Richard McGrath, Ind. since 17 October 2025
- Deputy: Graeme Taylor, Ind. since 17 March 2026
- CEO: Louise Miller since 13 March 2023

Structure
- Seats: 12 (including mayor)
- Political groups: Independent (12)
- Length of term: 3 years

Elections
- Voting system: First-past-the-post
- First election: 14 October 1989
- Last election: 11 October 2025
- Next election: 14 October 2028

Meeting place
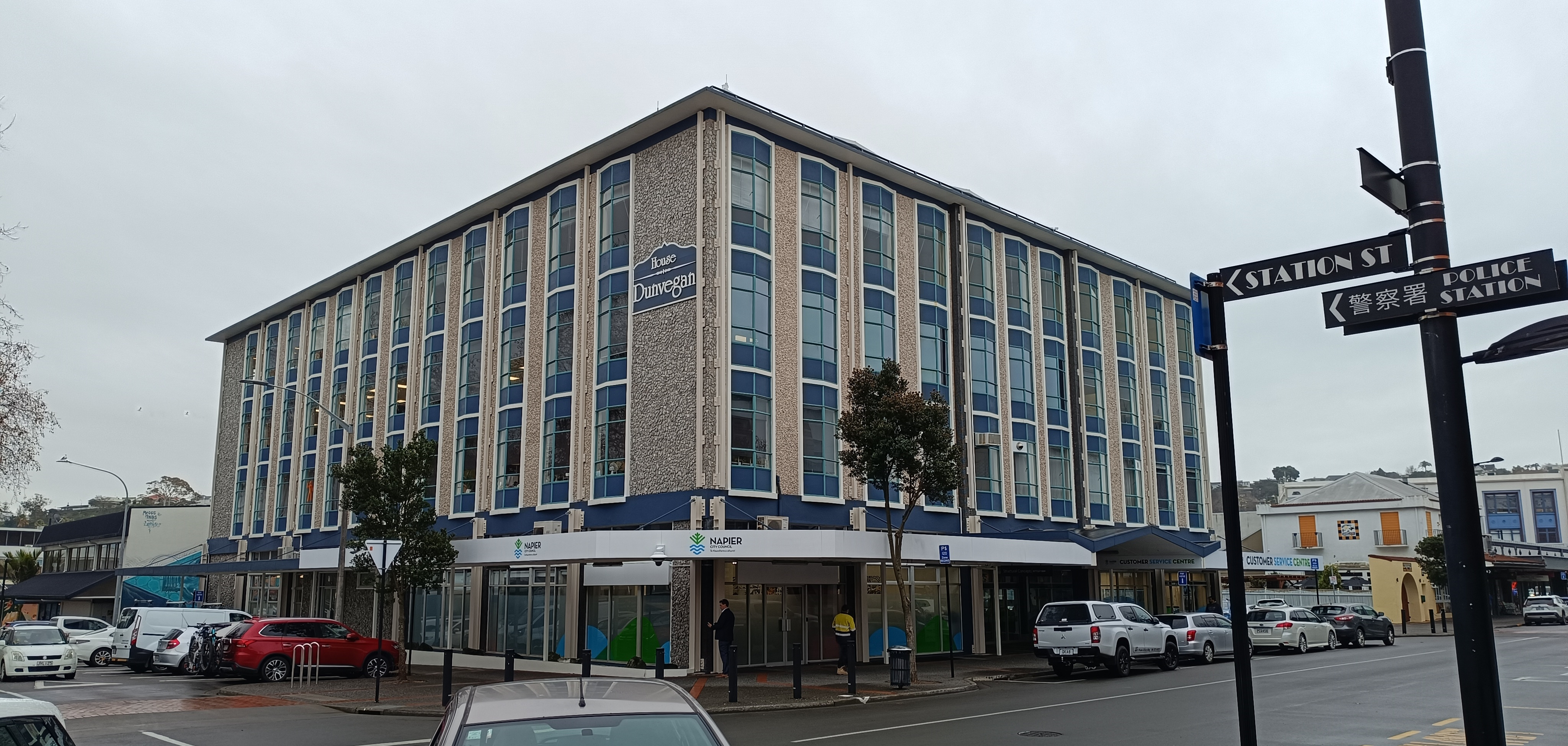
- Dunvegan House

Website
- napier.govt.nz

Napier City Council (NCC; Māori: Te Kaunihera o Ahuriri) is the territorial authority for the city of Napier, New Zealand. It serves as the city's local government alongside the Hawke's Bay Regional Council as the regional council.

A borough council was initially formed for the town of Napier in 1874. In 1950, the borough was granted city status and in 1968 Taradale Borough merged with it. Following the 1989 reforms to local government, that city council was dissolved and the current authority was established under the same name.

The governing body of council has 11 councillors and is chaired by the mayor of Napier (Richard McGrath since October 2025).

== Jurisdiction ==
The authority has local government responsibility over the city of Napier, from the coastal settlement of Bay View on the northern boundary, to Taradale on the southern Tūtaekuri river boundary. Its western boundary is in the hills immediately west of the city and its eastern boundary is the coast of Hawke Bay.

== History ==
A borough council was formed for Napier in 26 November 1874. The borough council gained city status on 18 March 1950. The borough of Taradale merged with Napier on 1 April 1968. In 1989, the city council was abolished and replaced with a new authority of the same name.

== Governing body ==
=== Mayor ===
One mayor is elected at large. They chair meetings of the governing body and act as the head of local government in the city.

=== Current composition ===
The current members of the governing body of council are:

Role	Portrait	Name	Affiliation	Ward
Mayor		Richard McGrath	Independent	Elected at large
Deputy		Graeme Taylor	Independent	Taradale
Councillor		Roger Brownlie	Independent	Ahuriri
Councillor		Keith Price	Independent	Ahuriri
Councillor		Sally Crown	Independent	Ahuriri
Councillor		Greg Mawson	Independent	Napier Central
Councillor		Craig Morley	Independent	Napier Central
Councillor		Te Kira Lawrence	Independent	Napier Central
Councillor		Ronda Chrystal	Independent	Taradale
Councillor		Nigel Simpson	Independent	Taradale
Councillor		Shyann Raihania	Independent	Te Whanga Māori
Councillor		Whare Isaac-Sharland	Independent	Te Whanga Māori

== Wards ==
The authority has four wards, including three general (Ahuriri, Napier Central, and Taradale) and one Māori ward (Te Whanga).

Ahuriri general ward is wide-ranging and includes the northern areas from Bay View south to Poraiti, Napier Hill, Central Napier, and the coastal areas south to Awatoto and the eastern part of Meeanee.

Napier Central general ward covers the suburbs in the geographic middle of the city, that is, most of Maraenui, Marewa, Onekawa, Pirimai and Tamatea (it does not include the CBD).

Taradale general ward covers Greenmeadows, Taradale and the western part of Meeanee.

Te Whanga is the Māori ward and covers the entire city.

== Elections ==
=== List ===
==== Council ====
- 1989
- 1992
- 1995
- 1998
- 2001
- 2004
- 2007
- 2010
- 2013
- 2016
- 2019
- 2022
- 2025

==== Mayoral ====
- 1989
- 1992
- 1995
- 1998
- 2001
- 2004
- 2007
- 2010
- 2013
- 2016
- 2019
- 2022
- 2025

== Coat of arms ==
Coat of arms of Napier City Council
Adopted 1951 Crest A hawk's leg couped and reversed (from the arms of Edward Hawke, 1st Baron Hawke) grasping with the claw a bone club called wahaika proper. Escutcheon Barry wavy of six azure and argent a fleece or (representing the wool industry) on a chief of the second three roses gules barbed and seeded proper. (from the arms of Francis Napier, 6th Lord Napier) Supporters On the dexter side a lion and the sinister side a kiwi both or. Motto Faith and Courage
