= Tūtaekurī River =

River in the Hastings District and Napier City, New Zealand

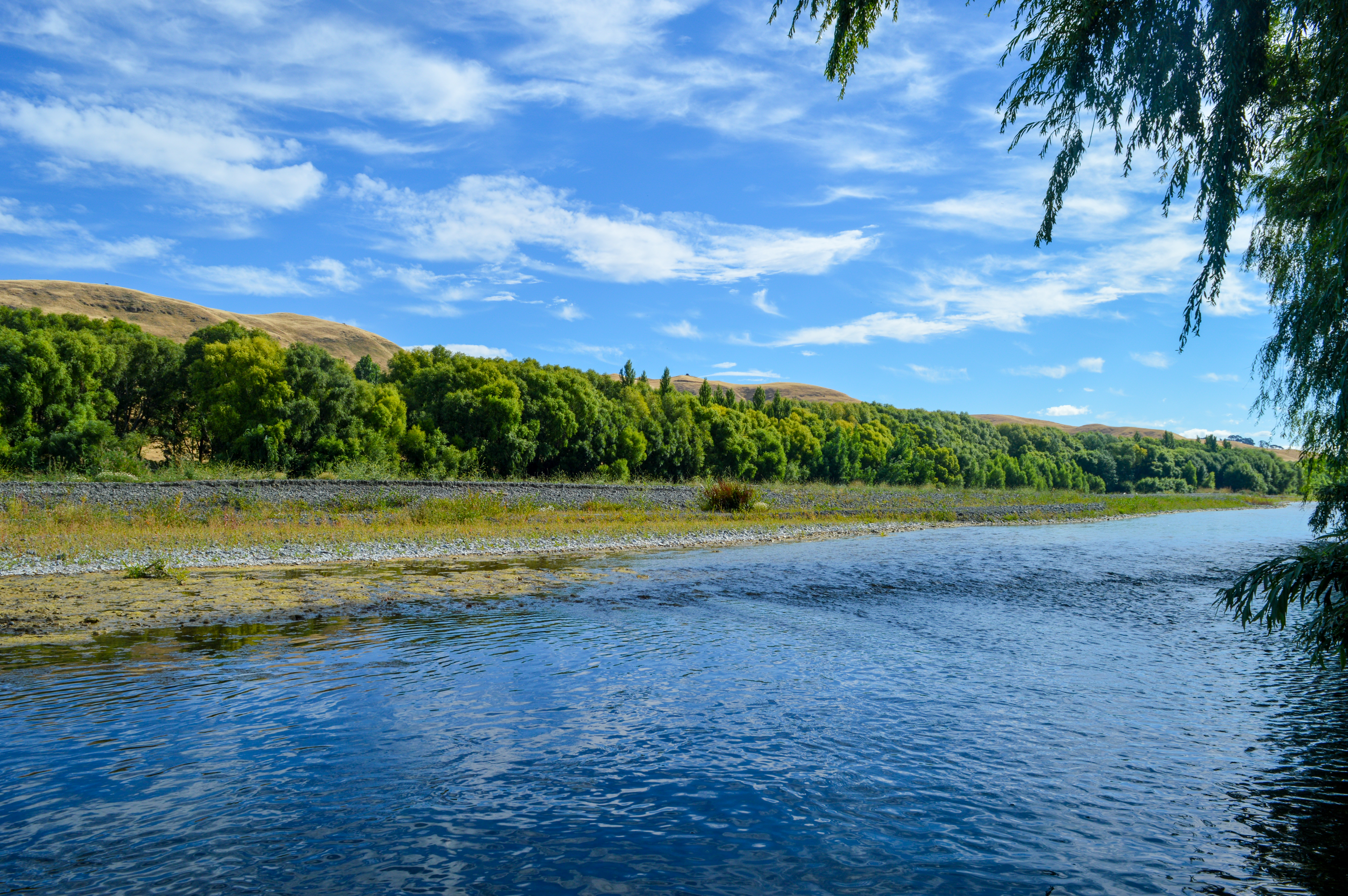
- The Tūtaekurī at Puketapu
- /0/queryThe property query is required; /0/idsThe property ids is required; /0Failed to match at least one schema; /0/titleThe property title is required; /0/serviceDoes not have a value in the enumeration ["page"]; /0Failed to match exactly one schema; /0/geometriesThe property geometries is required; /0/typeDoes not have a value in the enumeration ["GeometryCollection"]; /0/typeDoes not have a value in the enumeration ["MultiPolygon"]; /0/typeDoes not have a value in the enumeration ["Point"]; /0/typeDoes not have a value in the enumeration ["MultiPoint"]; /0/typeDoes not have a value in the enumeration ["LineString"]; /0/typeDoes not have a value in the enumeration ["MultiLineString"]; /0/typeDoes not have a value in the enumeration ["Polygon"]; /0/coordinatesThe property coordinates is required; /0/geometryThe property geometry is required; /0/typeDoes not have a value in the enumeration ["Feature"]; /0/featuresThe property features is required; /0/typeDoes not have a value in the enumeration ["FeatureCollection"]; Route of the Tūtaekurī River
- Mouth of the Tūtaekurī River Tūtaekurī River (North Island)
- Native name: Tūtaekurī (Māori)

Location
- Country: New Zealand
- Island: North Island
- Region: Hawke's Bay
- District: Hastings

Physical characteristics
- Source: Kaiārahi
  - location: Kaweka Range
  - coordinates: 39.3132°S 176.3597°E
  - elevation: 759 m (2,490 ft)
- Mouth: Ngaruroro River and Hawke Bay
  - location: Waitangi Estuary
  - coordinates: 39°33′53″S 176°54′38″E
  - elevation: 0 m (0 ft)
- Length: 99.9 km (62.1 mi)

Basin features
- Progression: Ngaruroro River → Hawke Bay → Pacific Ocean
- Tributaries
  - left: Kaiārahi Creek, Donald River, Mangatutu Stream, Mangaone River, Waitangi Stream
  - right: Gold Creek, Otakarara Stream, Waikōnini Stream, Upokohino Stream,
- Bridges: Lawrence Road swing bridge, Moteo-Puketapu Bridge, Redclyffe Bridge, Tūtaekurī River Bridge, Brookfields Bridge (destroyed), Tūtaekurī Railway Bridge, Tūtaekurī Bridge

The Tūtaekurī River (Māori: Tūtaekurī) flows eastward for 99.9 km (62.1 mi) through the Hawke's Bay region of the eastern North Island of New Zealand into the Pacific Ocean. It starts in the Kaweka Range roughly 50 km (31 mi) north-east of Taihape, and reaches the sea just to the south of Napier, where the Ngaruroro and Clive Rivers join it.

== Geography ==
Currently there are two distributaries for the Tūtaekurī River. Much of the river flows southeast into the Ngaruroro River, while a separate channel flows firectly into Hawke Bay.

== History ==
Ngāti Pārau, which is the local Māori hapū (sub-tribe), are said to have disposed of their waste food in the river. Tribes such as Ngāti Pāhauwera travelled to the river to share food and trade.

According to Ngāti Te Whatuiāpiti tradition, the river received the name Tūtaekurī, which means "dog excrement", in commemoration of a feast in the late seventeenth century, when Kaitahi was travelling from Pōrangahau to Oeroa with people from Ngāti Kahungunu, and his cousin Te Hikawera found the travellers en route eating kōuka (shoots of the tī kōuka or cabbage tree). Hikawera invited them to Te Umukuri and feasted them on eels, freshwater mussels, and dogs. The innards of the dogs were disposed of in the traditional manner in the nearby river, which therefore gained its name. In thanks for his hospitality, the guests gave Te Rangimokai as a wife for Te Hikawera. One of their sons, Te Kereru, was an ancestor of Ngāti Pārau.

Until 1931, the lowest part of the Tutaekuri River flowed north past Meeanee, which was built on its left bank, through present Marewa and Onekawa and into Ahuriri Lagoon. In the 1931 Hawke's Bay earthquake, the land underneath Ahuriri Lagoon was raised significantly. The river started to back up and to overflow in rain, causing flooding, so it was diverted to Waitangi, between Awatoto and Clive, where it now has a common outlet to the sea with the Ngaruroro River.

On 14 February 2023, the Tutaekuri River experienced a major flood as Cyclone Gabrielle moved over New Zealand. Due to the buildup of debris at key crossing points such as the Redclyffe and Brookfields bridges, the riverbanks failed, flooding large areas of Puketapu, Taradale, Meeanee and Awatoto. Four bridges crossing the Tutaekuri collapsed, while the major Redclyffe electrical substation beside the river was heavily damaged, leaving 32,000 properties in Napier without power.
