= Marewa =

Suburb of Napier, New Zealand

- Suburb
- Interactive map of Marewa
- Coordinates: 39.500718°S 176.901661°E
- Country: New Zealand
- City: Napier
- Local authority: Napier City Council
- Electoral ward: Nelson Park; Onekawa-Tamatea

Area
  - Land: 220 ha (540 acres)

Population (June 2025)
  - Total: 5,350
  - Density: 2,400/km^{2} (6,300/sq mi)

	Napier Hill
	Marewa	Napier South
Onekawa	Maraenui

Marewa (Māori: Mārewa) is a suburb of the city of Napier, in the Hawke's Bay Region of New Zealand's eastern North Island. Development of the suburb began in 1934, after the 1931 Hawke's Bay earthquake raised the previously low lying swamp land.

The suburb includes Marewa Park, a sports ground for soccer, cricket, athletics, marching and bowls, and Kennedy Park Resort, a popular family holiday accommodation provider.

Significant roads/streets in Marewa include: Latham Street, Kennedy Road, Douglas McLean Avenue, Nuffield Avenue and Taradale Road.

== Demographics ==
Marewa covers 2.20 km^{2} (0.85 sq mi) and had an estimated population of 5,350 as of June 2025, with a population density of 2,432 people per km^{2}.

Historical population
Year	Pop.	±% p.a.
2006	4,614	—
2013	4,671	+0.18%
2018	5,121	+1.86%
2023	5,157	+0.14%

Marewa had a population of 5,157 in the 2023 New Zealand census, an increase of 36 people (0.7%) since the 2018 census, and an increase of 486 people (10.4%) since the 2013 census. There were 2,448 males, 2,700 females, and 12 people of other genders in 1,989 dwellings. 2.8% of people identified as LGBTIQ+. The median age was 36.3 years (compared with 38.1 years nationally). There were 1,053 people (20.4%) aged under 15 years, 1,047 (20.3%) aged 15 to 29, 2,274 (44.1%) aged 30 to 64, and 786 (15.2%) aged 65 or older.

People could identify as more than one ethnicity. The results were 72.6% European (Pākehā); 35.8% Māori; 4.8% Pasifika; 6.2% Asian; 1.3% Middle Eastern, Latin American and African New Zealanders (MELAA); and 1.9% other, which includes people giving their ethnicity as "New Zealander". English was spoken by 96.3%, Māori by 8.2%, Samoan by 1.0%, and other languages by 6.6%. No language could be spoken by 2.5% (e.g. too young to talk). New Zealand Sign Language was known by 0.9%. The percentage of people born overseas was 14.6, compared with 28.8% nationally.

Religious affiliations were 26.9% Christian, 0.6% Hindu, 0.8% Islam, 5.2% Māori religious beliefs, 0.9% Buddhist, 0.6% New Age, 0.1% Jewish, and 1.3% other religions. People who answered that they had no religion were 57.3%, and 6.7% of people did not answer the census question.

Of those at least 15 years old, 618 (15.1%) people had a bachelor's or higher degree, 2,301 (56.1%) had a post-high school certificate or diploma, and 1,185 (28.9%) people exclusively held high school qualifications. The median income was $36,900, compared with $41,500 nationally. 192 people (4.7%) earned over $100,000 compared to 12.1% nationally. The employment status of those at least 15 was 1,971 (48.0%) full-time, 537 (13.1%) part-time, and 183 (4.5%) unemployed.

Individual statistical areas
Name	Area (km^{2})	Population	Density (per km^{2})	Dwellings	Median age	Median income
Marewa West	0.79	1,710	4,696	741	44.0 years	$42,300
Marewa East	1.40	3,447	2,462	1,248	33.2 years	$34,000
New Zealand					38.1 years	$41,500

== Education ==
Marewa School in the suburb is a co-educational state primary school, with a roll of 218 as of July 2025. The school opened in 1942.
