= Napier Port =

Napier port
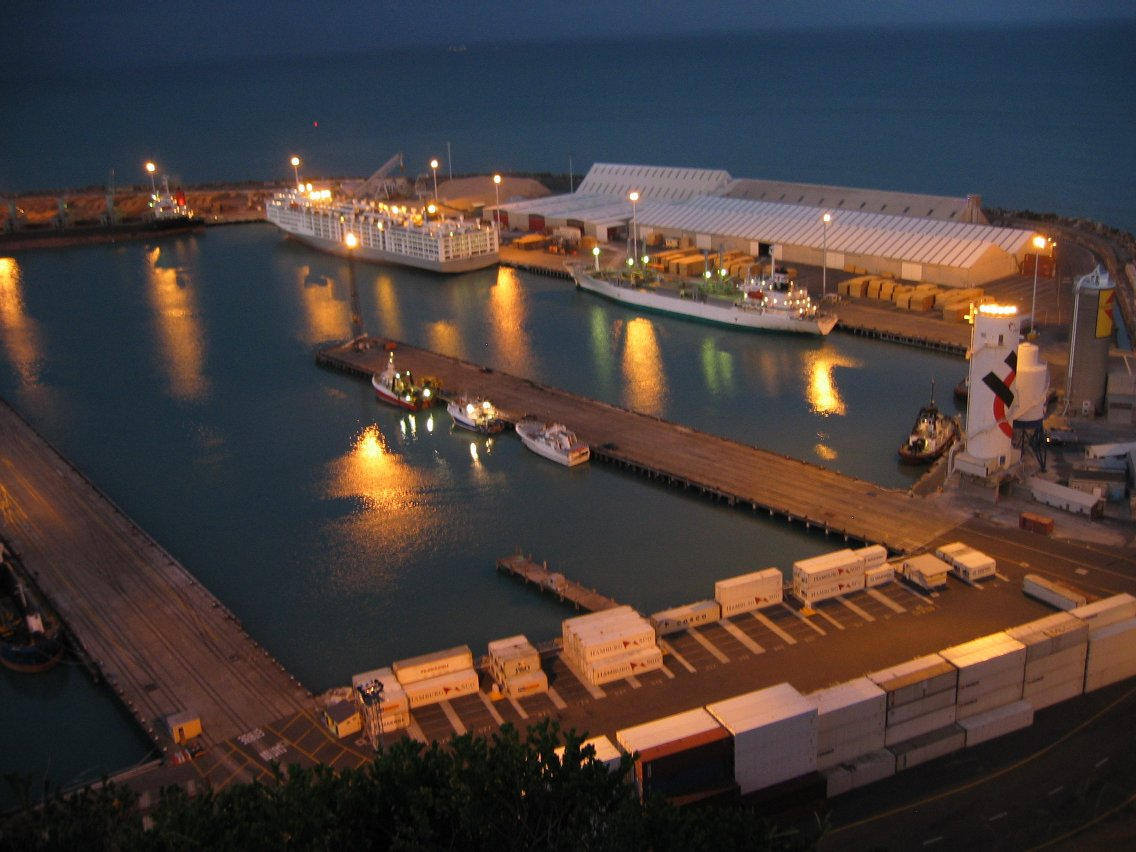
- Napier Port at night
- Interactive map of Napier port
- Location within New Zealand

Location
- Country: New Zealand
- Location: Hawke's Bay
- Coordinates: 39.4748°S 176.9191°E
- UN/LOCODE: NZNPE

Details
- No. of berths: 5
- Draft depth: 12.4 m.

Statistics
- Website; Official website

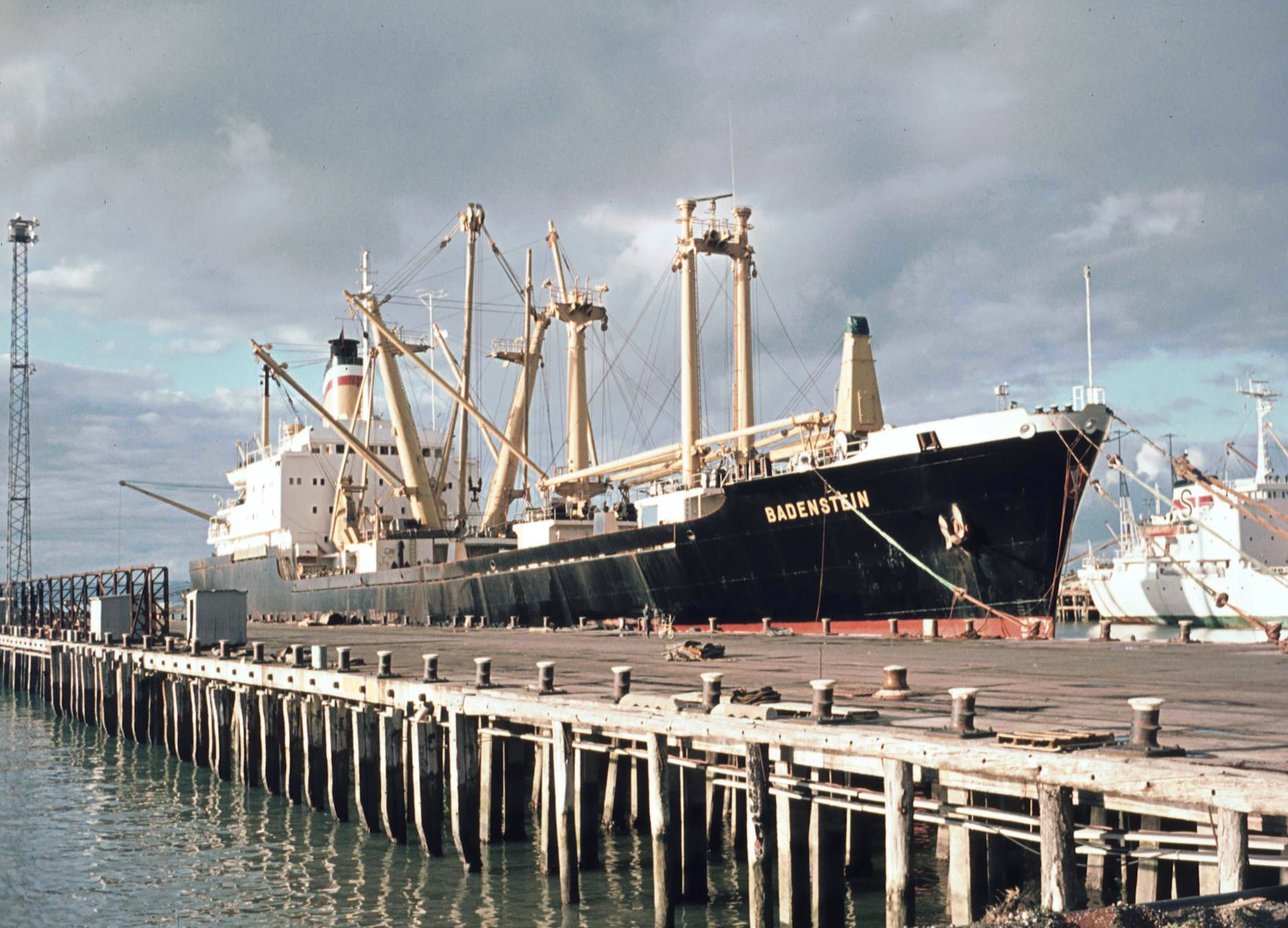
Hapag-Lloyd cargo ship MV Badenstein in Napier Port in 1974

Napier Port is in Napier, New Zealand, on Hawke Bay. It is the North Island's second largest export port by tonnage. It is owned by Napier Port Holdings Limited (NZX: NPH), which is 55% owned by Hawke's Bay Regional Council through its wholly owned subsidiary Hawke's Bay Regional Investment Company, as of November 2024.

The port handles the fourth-largest number of containers in the country, behind Tauranga, Auckland and Lyttelton. It handled 172,792 containers (9% of all containers handled by New Zealand ports) in the 2017 calendar year.

Hastings District, one of the largest apple, pear and stone fruit producing areas in New Zealand, has an important relationship with Napier Port, with the fruit passing from the growers around metropolitan Hastings and then to Napier for exporting. Napier is an important service centre for the agriculture and pastoral output of the predominantly rural Hastings District. The port is connected to the rail network via the Napier Port Branch (Ahuriri Branch).

The port hosts dozens of cruise ship visits each year. On 16 February 2008 it was visited by the longest vessel it had received at the time, the MS Queen Victoria cruise ship belonging to Cunard. On 15 December 2014, the 138,194 tonne MS Voyager of the Seas visited the port, which was the joint 21st largest passenger ship at the time, and the largest to ever visit. On 5 January 2017, the port hosted the world's third largest cruise ship (at the time), the 168,666 tonne MS Ovation of the Seas.

== History ==
A public poll was held in January 1885 on the decision to move the port from the Ahuriri spit to its current location, beneath Bluff Hill. The breakwater harbor was completed in 1886, and the container depot was established in 1994.

A new wharf, operational in June 2022 and officially opened in July 2022, was constructed to handle projected volume growth and larger vessels. This was the port's largest ever single investment, completed at a total cost of approximately NZ$175 million.

== Noise issues ==
Expansion of the port (including the handling of larger vessels) has led to increased noise, which has met with opposition and protest from residents in the Bluff Hill area. Noise mitigation measures agreed in 2016 have failed to keep pace with the port's expansion and changing operations. Noise monitoring and reporting was undertaken by Napier Port's contracted "noise experts", rather than by independently appointed acoustic consultants. The report was released in February 2020.

A public consultation in August 2020 failed to offer any resolution for residents, particularly with regard to night-time noise, and public submissions received no further response from Napier Port or its ownership. Hawke's Bay Regional Council (majority owner of the port) and Napier City Council, as the local government authorities that may have enforced stricter controls on port noise, have failed to provide any such support for residents.
