= Hawke Bay =

Bay on the coast of New Zealand

- Te Matau-a-Māui (Māori)
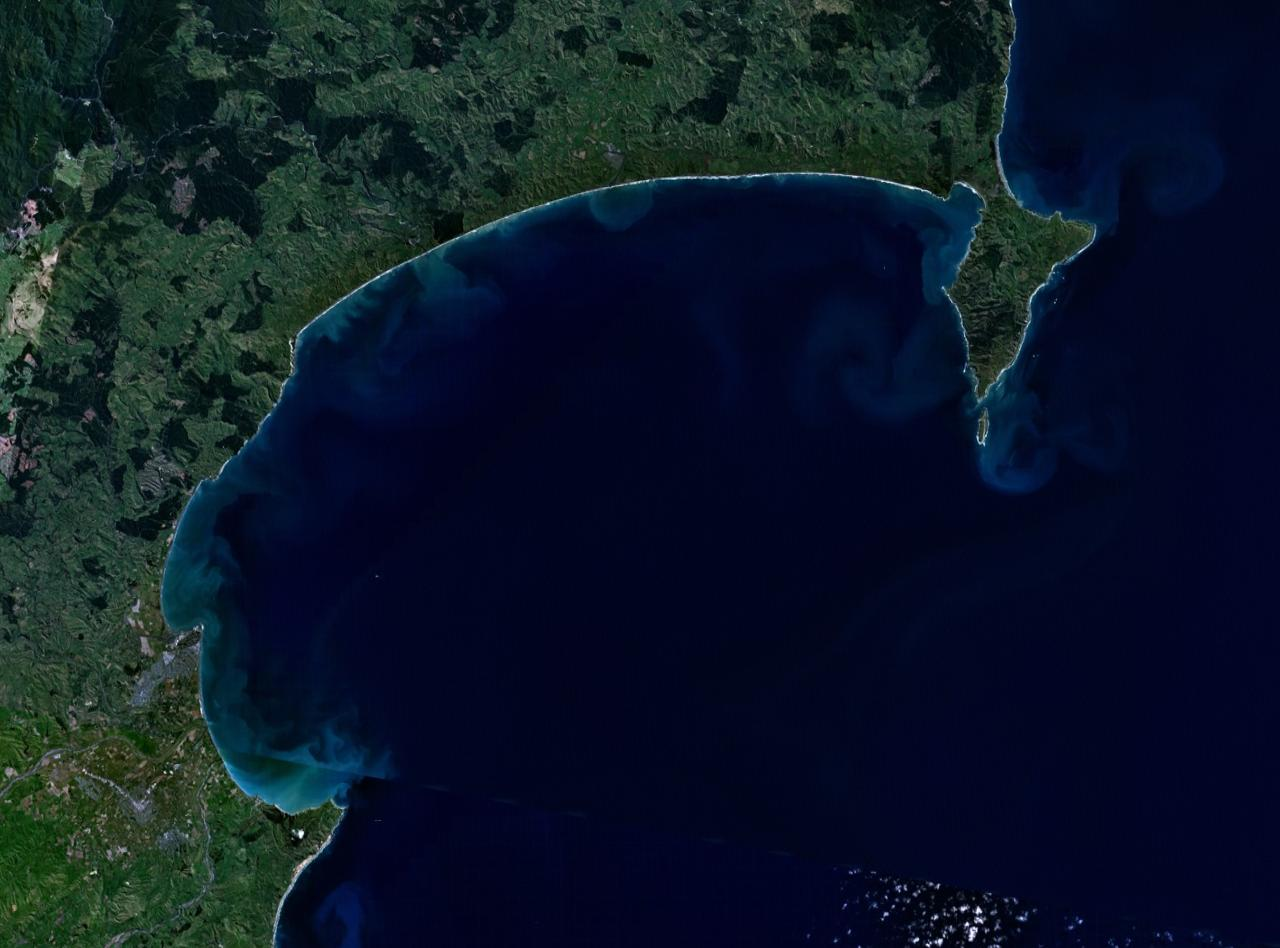
- NASA satellite photo of Hawke Bay

- Location within New Zealand
- Location: Hawke's Bay
- Coordinates: 39°20′S 177°30′E
- Type: Bight
- Etymology: Named after Edward Hawke, 1st Baron Hawke
- Part of: South Pacific Ocean
- Primary inflows: Nūhaka River, Wairoa River, Mohaka River, Esk River, Tūtaekurī River, Ngaruroro River, Clive River, Tukituki River
- Ocean/sea sources: South Pacific Ocean
- Basin countries: New Zealand
- Max. width: 91 kilometres (57 mi)
- Shore length^{1}: 166 kilometres (103 mi)
- Settlements: Napier, Hastings, Wairoa
- ^{1} Shore length is not a well-defined measure.

Hawke Bay (Māori: Te Matau-a-Māui), formerly named Hawke's Bay, is a large bay on the east coast of the North Island of New Zealand, surrounded by the Hawke's Bay region. It stretches from Māhia Peninsula in the northeast to Cape Kidnappers / Te Kauwae-a-Māui in the southwest, a distance of some 90 kilometres (56 mi).

Captain James Cook, sailing in HMS Endeavour, entered the bay on 12 October 1769. After exploring it, he named it for Sir Edward Hawke, First Lord of the Admiralty, on 15 October 1769, describing it as some 13 leagues (about 40 miles (64 km)) across. Hawke had decisively defeated the French at the Battle of Quiberon Bay in 1759.

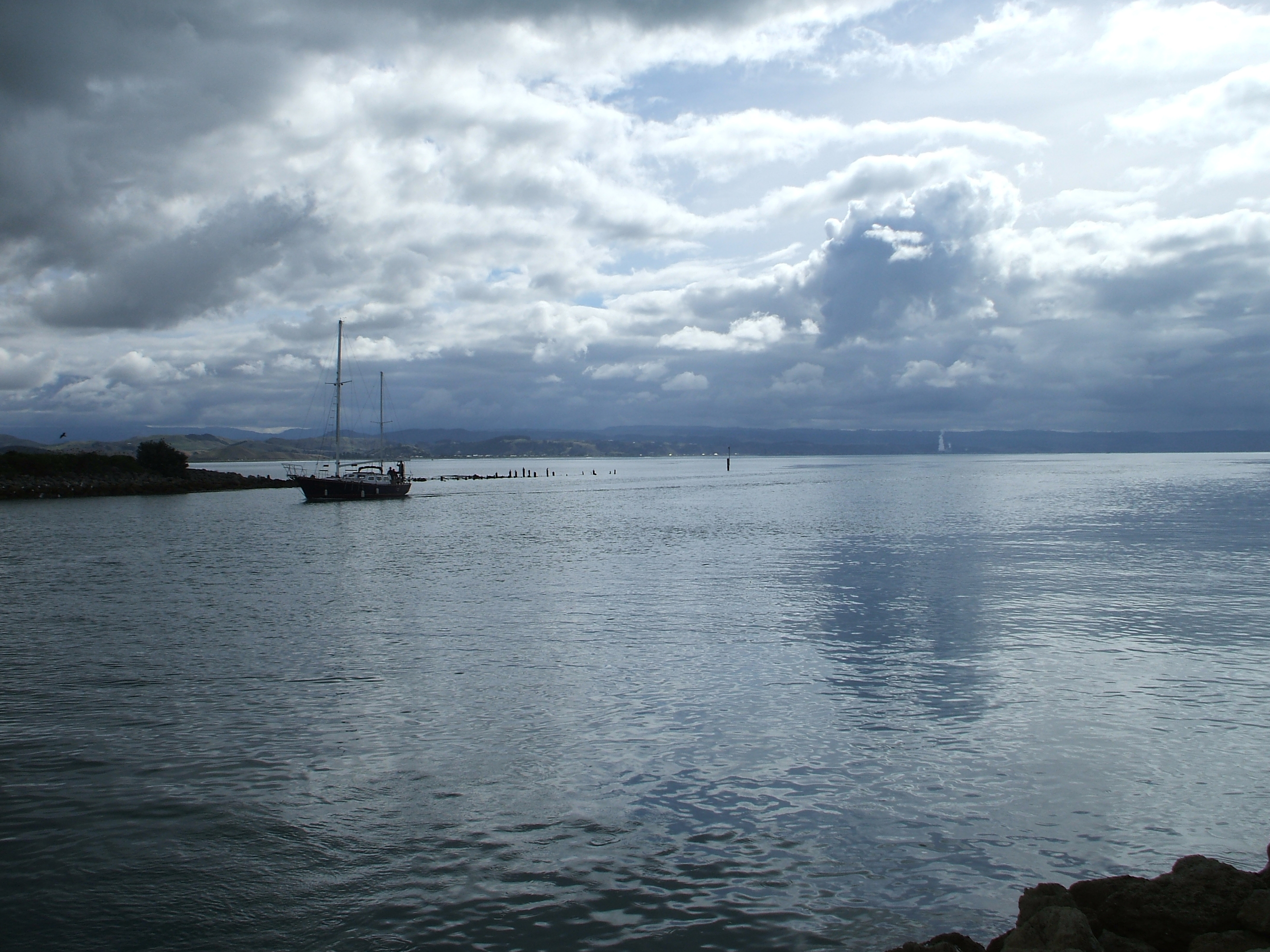
Hawke Bay at Napier

This part of the New Zealand coast is subject to tectonic uplift, with the land being raised out of the sea. For this reason, the coastal land in this area has significant marine deposits, with both marine and land dinosaur fossils having been found inland. The Napier earthquake of 3 February 1931 resulted in several parts of the seabed close to the city of Napier being raised above sea level. Because the central mountain ranges come close to the coast at the north end of the bay, much of the bay's northerly coastline has deeply eroded tablelands that end in steep seaside cliffs which descend to narrow beaches.

Despite the bay being renamed Hawke Bay, without an apostrophe, the region surrounding it continues to bear the former name of Hawke's Bay. Several medium-sized towns are located in the immediate surrounds of the bay, including Wairoa at the mouth of the Wairoa River and its flood plain in the north, the so-called 'twin cities' of Napier and Hastings in the south, and the town of Havelock North slightly further inland. Napier Port serves as the main export port for the region, and is the second largest in the North Island by tonnage.
