= State Highway 2 (New Zealand) =

Road in New Zealand

State Highway 2

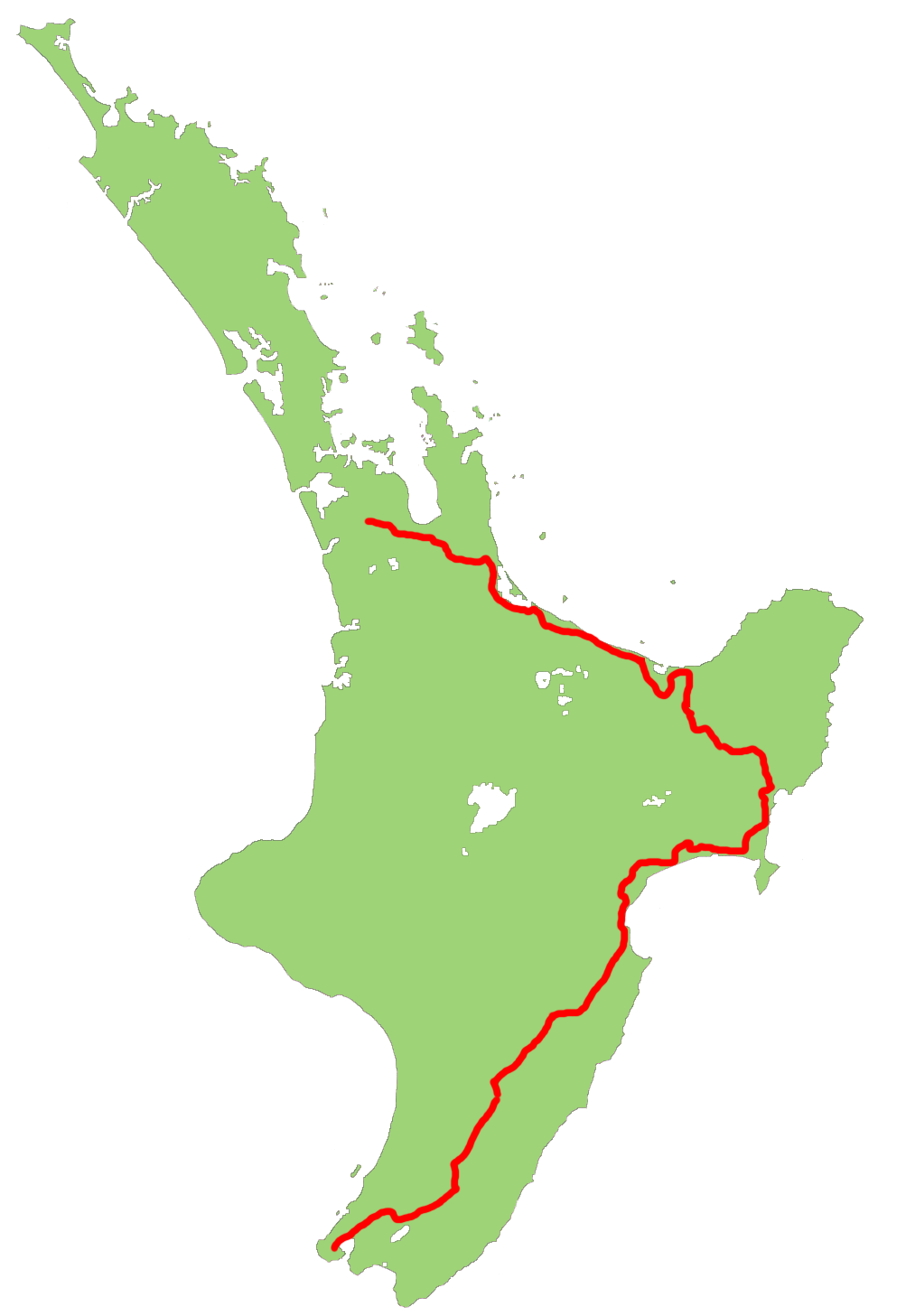

Route information
- Maintained by NZ Transport Agency Waka Kotahi
- Length: 968 km (601 mi)
- Tourist routes: Pacific Coast Highway; Classic New Zealand Wine Trail

Major junctions
- North end: SH 1 (Waikato Expressway) near Pōkeno
- SH 5 (Napier-Taupō Highway) near Bay View; SH 3 (Vogel Street) in Woodville
- South end: SH 1 (Wellington Urban Motorway/Centennial Highway) at Ngauranga Interchange

Location
- Country: New Zealand
- Primary destinations: Paeroa, Waihi, Tauranga, Whakatāne, Ōpōtiki, Gisborne, Wairoa, Napier, Hastings, Waipukurau, Dannevirke, Masterton, Carterton, Featherston, Upper Hutt, Lower Hutt, Wellington

Highway system
- New Zealand state highways; Motorways and expressways; List
← SH 1	→ SH 3

State Highway 2 (SH 2) runs north–south through eastern parts of the North Island of New Zealand from the outskirts of Auckland to Wellington. It runs through Tauranga, Gisborne, Napier, Hastings and Masterton. It is the second-longest highway in the North Island, after State Highway 1, which runs the length of both of the country's main islands.

For most of its length it consists of a two-lane single carriageway, with frequent passing lanes. There are sections of four-lane dual-carriageway expressway at Maramarua, Tauranga and Wellington.

== Route ==
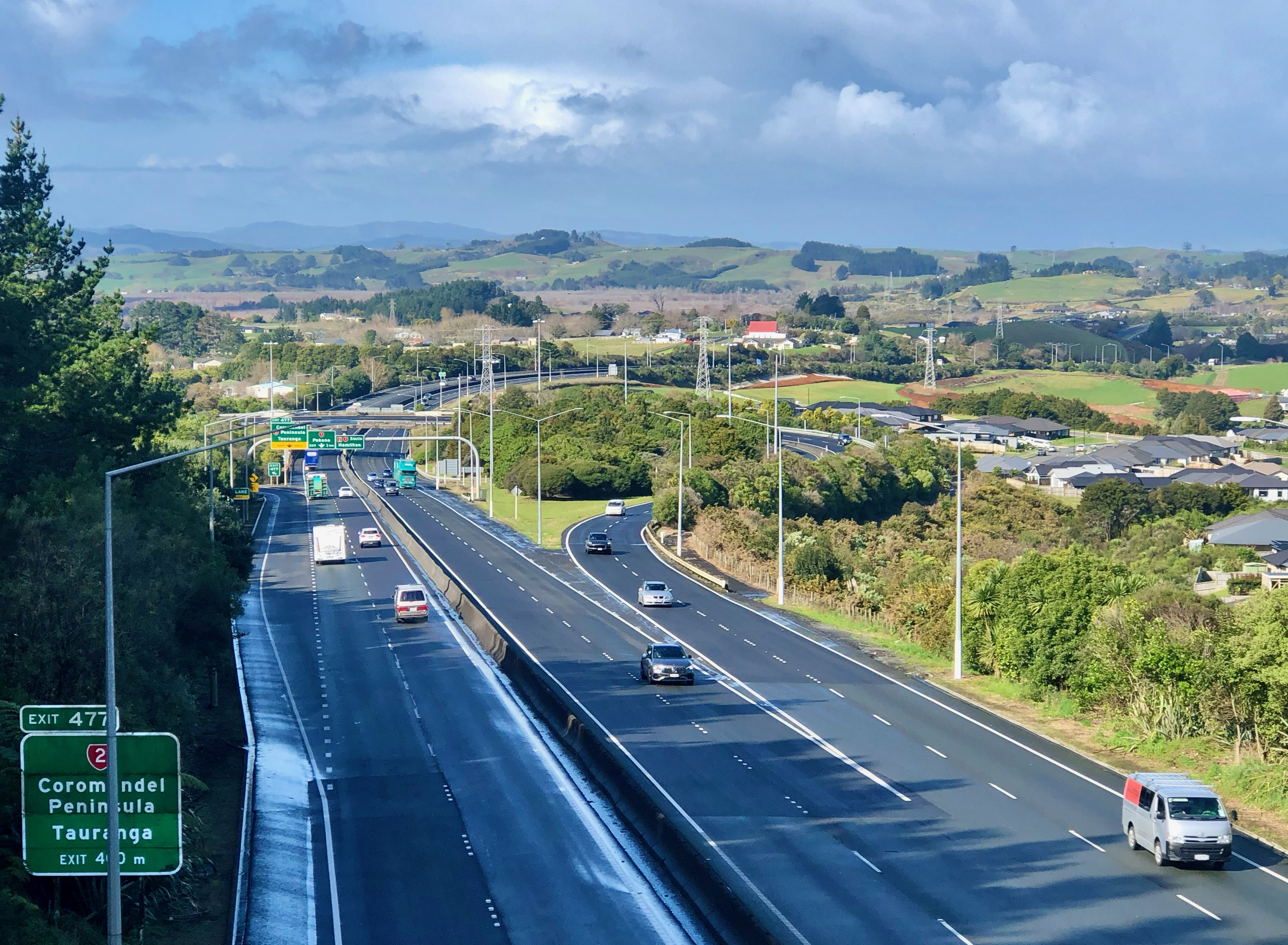
The northern start of SH2, at its junction with SH1 at Pōkeno in 2021

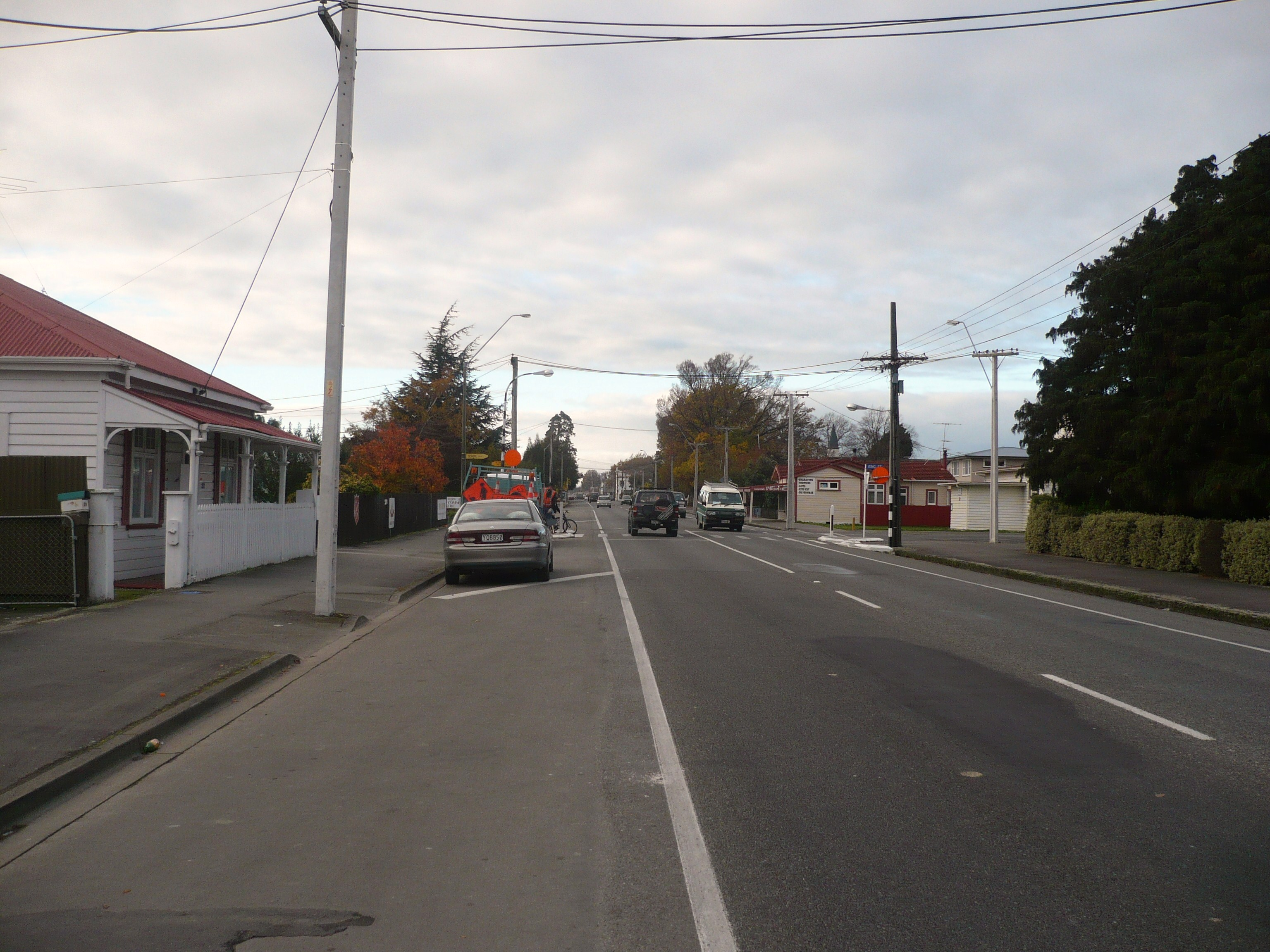
Looking north on SH 2 (High Street South) in Carterton, 80 km (50 mi) from its terminus near Wellington.

SH 2 leaves SH 1 just north of Pōkeno, 49 km (30 mi) south of central Auckland. It heads east, crossing the Hauraki Plains before running the length of the Karangahake Gorge, a break in the hills between the Coromandel Peninsula and Kaimai Ranges. From the mining town of Waihi it runs southeast, skirting the edge of Tauranga Harbour, which it crosses on the Tauranga Harbour Bridge before connecting to the 23 km (14 mi) Tauranga Eastern Link, a four lane toll motorway. After reaching Paengaroa Junction with SH 33, SH 2 reverts to highway status and follows the coast for a further 34 km (21 mi), until it reaches the village of Matatā.

From Matatā it heads slightly inland, crossing the Rangitaiki plain to the south of Whakatāne, loops south to Tāneatua, through the Waimana gorge and then back north to the coast near Ōpōtiki. After Ōpōtiki it turns inland, ascending southeast along the valley of the Waioeka River, then winding up to the 725-metre (2,380 ft) Traffords Hill summit. From here it descends into the watershed of the Waipaoa River following the river valley from Te Karaka to Makaraka, just outside Gisborne, to which it is connected by a short stretch of SH 35.

It then turns south, passing the Wharerata Forest and the isthmus of the Māhia Peninsula, turning west to follow the coast of Hawke Bay. Close to the mouth of the Waihua River it heads briefly inland, passing the Mohaka Forest and Lake Tūtira before rejoining the coast not far from the junction with SH 5 at Bay View. It then joins the Hawke's Bay Expressway and bypasses the cities of Napier and Hastings where the expressway ends at Pakipaki, just south of Hastings.

It continues to head inland from Pakipaki, initially southwest to Waipukurau, then briefly west to follow tributaries of the Tukituki River upstream. Close to Norsewood enters the Tararua District and turns south-west, a direction it maintains for much of the remainder of its journey, crossing undulating country that forms the upper catchment of the Manawatū River. In Woodville, SH 2 meets SH 3 at a TOTSO intersection. SH 2 continues south along the Mangatainoka and Makakahi rivers through Pahiatua and Eketāhuna, crossing into the Wairarapa valley via the Mount Bruce saddle.

SH 2 follows the Wairarapa valley through the towns of Masterton, Carterton and Greytown to Featherston. The highway then winds through the Remutaka Pass, between the Remutaka and Tararua Ranges, crossing into the Hutt Valley. SH 2 follows the Hutt River down the valley, passing the cities of Upper Hutt and Lower Hutt to the west, to reach the northern end of Wellington Harbour at Petone. From central Upper Hutt, SH 2 widens to a 2+1 road before widening further to four lanes divided at Silverstream, before finally becoming expressway standard with grade-separated junctions south of Melling. The highway follows the shoreline of Wellington Harbour to Ngauranga, where the Wellington Urban Motorway commences at the Ngauranga Interchange. Here, SH 1 merges on to the Wellington Urban Motorway from the Ngauranga Gorge, and SH 2 ends at this point with the Wellington Urban Motorway carrying the SH 1 designation into Wellington.

Although the Ngauranga Interchange is the official end of SH 2, it is signed northbound on SH 1 as far back as the Mount Victoria Tunnel, 8 km (5 mi) before it begins.

== Spur sections ==
SH 2 used to have two spur sections:

- SH 2A ran for 3.8 km from SH 2 through Tauranga, along 15th Avenue and Turret Road, to the junction with SH 29 (now SH 29A) at Maungatapu. This route was once the original route for SH 2 before it was shifted to the newly duplicated Tauranga Harbour Bridge. In August 2015, this state highway lost its full state highway status in conjunction with Takitimu Drive (Route K) Toll Road becoming part of the state highway network.
- SH 2B was the northern part of the Hawke's Bay Expressway, running for 4.1 km from SH 2 at Hawke's Bay Airport to SH 50 at Taradale. SH 2 took over this designation in 2019.

== History ==
The section of SH 2 through Mangatawhiri had a poor crash record, and the seven-kilometre Mangatawhiri Deviation was opened in December 2008 to improve safety by bypassing it. Passing lanes in both directions provide safe passing opportunities. Grade-separated intersections improve safety for traffic wanting to cross or join the highway.

SH 2 used to follow former SH 2A's route in Tauranga, along 15th Ave, into Turret Road, and across the harbour to Maungatapu, where it joined SH 29, and then headed across the Maungatapu Bridge to Te Maunga. This was changed in 2009 when a second harbour bridge opened next to the current one, providing four lanes of traffic and an overpass from the harbour bridges to the Takitimu Drive expressway. SH 2A became the old section until it was revoked in 2015.

Before 3 August 2015, SH 2 used to travel via Te Puke. The Tauranga Eastern Link, a tolled motorway almost 23 km from Te Maunga Junction to Paengaroa officially opened on 30 July 2015. SH 2 now follows the Tauranga Eastern Link. The new four lane highway was constructed as part of the National government's Roads of National Significance, improving access from the east (Te Puke, Whakatāne, Ōpōtiki, Gisborne) and south from Rotorua and Taupō. It is the main route for trucks heading to the Port of Tauranga from Rotorua and the eastern Bay of Plenty, and connects the economically-important central plateau forestry industry with the port for export. This NZTA administered road was originally tolled at $2.00 for cars and motorcycles and $5.00 for trucks.

SH 2 used to extend into Whakatāne, but this section was moved inland to pass through Edgecumbe and Awakeri, with SH 30 extended to Whakatāne to cover the former route.

SH 2 used to run through the centres of Napier and Hastings before running to Pakipaki, following a coastal route between Napier and Hastings via Clive. In 2005, 9.8 kilometres (6.1 mi) of SH 2 from the northern outskirts of Hastings, through central Hastings and up to the southern terminus of the Hawke's Bay Expressway (numbered SH 50A at the time) at Pakipaki was revoked. In 2019, SH 2 was shifted to the expressway to reduce confusion, and the route between Napier and Hastings received a new designation of SH 51.

In 1871 contracts were let to clear parts of the Seventy Mile Bush, totalling 27 1/4 mi (43.9 km) long, by 66 ft (20 m) wide, for the Takapau to Woodville section of the road, which now forms 61 km (38 mi) of SH2. It was designated as a Main Highway in 1924 and metalling of the section near Takapau was done in 1926.

The Rimutaka Hill Road, traversing the Remutaka Ranges between Featherston and Upper Hutt, has a poor crash record, with many tight 25 and 35 km/h corners, and a lack of safety barriers to prevent vehicles dropping down off the road. The original winding route between Kaitoke and Te Marua was significantly realigned between 2002 and 2006. The tightest and narrowest corner on the road, named Muldoon's Corner after the former Prime Minister's financial stance ("tight and to the right"), is being bypassed with a new wider 55 km/h corner.

River Road, between Maoribank and Silverstream in Upper Hutt, was opened in 1987 to bypass central Upper Hutt. The new route was a two-laned single-carriageway 100 km/h road on the Hutt River's banks, crossing the river at Moonshine, and replaced the 50 km/h route via Fergusson Drive. Most of the road of the road has been widened to three lanes, and median barriers have been installed, with only the Moonshine Bridge and north of Totara Park Drive still having two lanes undivided (Gibbons Street to Totara Park is three lanes undivided).

SH 2's southern terminus has also changed. It formed the southern part of the Wellington Urban Motorway when SH 1 finished at the Aotea Quay off-ramp. In 1996, SH 1 replaced this section.

Flooding of the Waikari River during Cyclone Gabrielle destroyed the highway bridge over the river at Putorino. In the same event, the road was also destroyed at Devil's Elbow near Tutira.

== Future developments ==
Currently there are several projects to improve SH 2. They include:

- Pokeno to Mangatarata: under investigation to improve the highway between SH1 at Pokeno and SH27 at Mangatarata.
- Waihi to Tauranga Corridor, which consists of four sub-projects:
  - Waihi to Omokoroa safety improvements: includes installing run-off barriers and a wide centre line, and improving 26 intersections.
  - Katikati Bypass: an investigation is currently being undertaken into the long-standing designation for the bypass to ensure that it will meet the future needs of Katikati, and is consistent with NZTA's overall strategy for long-term management of SH 2.
  - Omokoroa to Te Puna Expressway: a 7 km expressway following the existing SH 2 alignment from Omokoroa Road to the Takitimu North Link connection at Te Puna. The project includes a grade separated interchange at Omokoroa Road and building parallel local roads to serve existing side roads and driveways.
  - Takitimu North Link: a 6.8 km deviation bypassing Bethlehem and Te Puna to the south and bisecting SH 29 at the Takitimu Drive Toll Road. Construction started in January 2022
- SH2 Wainui Road to Ōpōtiki: Road and roadside safety improvements are proposed from the outskirts of Ōhope, along Wainui Road and SH 2 to near Ōpōtiki.
- Melling and Kennedy-Good Bridges and Interchanges: Improved interchanges are planned for the Melling and Kennedy-Good bridges over the Hutt River and the associated interchanges.

== Traffic ==
The busiest section of SH 2 is north of the Ngauranga Interchange in Wellington. measured in 2019 to have an AADT 66,447 vehicles per day. The quietest section of road is at the Parihohonu Bridge, north of Otoko in the Gisborne District, measured in 2019 to have an AADT of 1,188 vehicles per day.

== Major intersections ==
Territorial authority	Location	km	mi	Destinations	Notes
Waikato District	Pōkeno	0	0.0	SH 1 north (Waikato Expressway) – Auckland; SH 1 south (Waikato Expressway) – Pōkeno, Hamilton	SH 2 begins
Hauraki District	Mangatarata	34	21	SH 25 – Thames, Coromandel Peninsula	
Hauraki District	Mangatarata	37	23	SH 27 – Matamata, Tīrau	
Hauraki District	Paeroa	72	45	SH 26 north (Arney Street) – Thames, Coromandel Peninsula	SH 2/SH 26 concurrency begins
Hauraki District	Paeroa	73	45	SH 26 south (Te Aroha Road) – Te Aroha, Hamilton	SH 2/SH 26 concurrency ends
Hauraki District	Waihi	93	58	SH 25 north (Kenny Street) – Whangamatā, Tairua	
Western Bay of Plenty District	No major junctions				
Tauranga City	Tauranga Central	151	94	(Fifteenth Avenue) – Maungatapu, Welcome Bay	Former SH 2A. Eastbound exit and westbound entry only. Right-hand exit.
Tauranga City	Tauranga Central	151	94	SH 29 (Takitimu Drive Toll Road) – Hamilton, Rotorua	Westbound exit and eastbound entry only
Tauranga City	Tauranga Central	156	97	Tauranga Harbour Bridge	
Tauranga City	Te Maunga	164	102	SH 29A – Maungatapu, Tauriko	Tauranga Eastern Link begins
Tauranga City	Papamoa	171	106	(Domain Road / Te Puke Highway) – Papamoa, Te Puke	
Western Bay of Plenty District	Rangiuru	181	112	Toll point	
Western Bay of Plenty District	Paengaroa	189	117	SH 33 – Rotorua (Te Puke Highway) – Te Puke	Tauranga Eastern Link ends Toll-free route west via Te Puke Highway
Whakatāne District	Hawkens Junction	232	144	SH 34 (Awaiti South Road) – Kawerau, Rotorua	
Whakatāne District	Awakeri	242	150	SH 30 west – Rotorua	SH 2/SH 30 concurrency begins
Whakatāne District	Awakeri	243	151	SH 30 east – Whakatāne	SH 2/SH 30 concurrency ends
Ōpōtiki District	Ōpōtiki	304	189	SH 35 (St John Street) – Te Kaha, Te Araroa	
Gisborne District	Matawhero	443	275	SH 35 (Awapuni Road) – Gisborne	
Gisborne District	Matawhero	446	277	(Tiniroto Road) – Tiniroto, Wairoa	Former SH 36
Wairoa District	North Clyde	533	331	SH 38 (Mahia Avenue) – Frasertown, Waikaremoana	
Hastings District	No major junctions				
Napier City	Bay View	638	396	SH 5 (Eskdale Drive) – Taupō	
Napier City	Westshore	647	402	(Meeanee Quay) – Ahuriri (Watchman Road) – Airport	Hawke's Bay Expressway begins
Napier City	Onekawa	649	403	SH 50 north (Prebensen Drive) – Port, City Centre	SH 2/SH 50 concurrency begins
Napier City	Onekawa	651	405	SH 51 (Taradale Road) – City Centre	
Hastings District	Pakowhai	658	409	(Pakowhai Road) – Havelock North; SH 50 south (Links Road) – Taihape	SH 2/SH 50 concurrency ends
Hastings District	Pakipaki	678	421	(Railway Road) – Hastings (Te Aute Road) – Havelock North	Hawke's Bay Expressway ends
Central Hawke's Bay District	Waipukurau	721	448	(Porangahau Road) – Pōrangahau	Former SH 52
Central Hawke's Bay District	Takapau	743	462	SH 50 – Tikokino, Ongaonga	
Tararua District	Woodville	802	498	SH 3 (Vogel Street) – Palmerston North	
Masterton District	Lansdowne	883	549	(Te Ore Ore Road) – Castlepoint, Riversdale Beach	Former SH 52
Carterton District	No major junctions				
South Wairarapa District	Featherston	921	572	SH 53 (Revans Street) – Martinborough	
South Wairarapa District / Upper Hutt City boundary		931	578	Remutaka Pass 555 m (1,821 ft)	
Upper Hutt City	Maoribank	950	590	(Fergusson Drive) – Mangaroa, Upper Hutt City Centre	Hutt Expressway begins
Lower Hutt City	Manor Park	962	598	SH 58 (Haywards Hill Road / Manor Park Road) – Manor Park, Pāuatahanui, Porirua	
Wellington City	Ngauranga	979	608	To SH 1 north (Hutt Road) – Ngauranga, Porirua, Picton Ferry; SH 1 south (Wellington Urban Motorway) – Wellington, Wellington Airport	SH 2 and Hutt Expressway end
Concurrency terminus; Incomplete access; Tolled; Route transition
