= Hawke's Bay Expressway =

Road in New Zealand

Route information
- Length: 24 km (15 mi)
- Component highways: SH 2

Major junctions
- North end: SH 2 – near Napier Airport
- SH 50 north – Pirimai; SH 51; SH 50 south – near Pakowhai
- South end: SH 2 – Pakipaki, south of Hastings

Location
- Country: New Zealand
- Major cities: Napier, Hastings

Highway system
- New Zealand state highways; Motorways and expressways; List

The Hawke's Bay Expressway, known also as the Napier-Hastings Expressway, runs from Hawke's Bay Airport, through Napier and Hastings, and ends at Pakipaki, just south of Hastings, a total length of 24 km. It is part of State Highway 2 (SH 2).

== History ==
When the airport at Westshore, Napier, was confirmed as Hawke's Bay's main airport in 1957, Hastings leaders objected, preferring to have an airport closer to their city. The Government set up an Airport Inquiry Committee in 1961 to settle the matter. They confirmed the Napier airport as the best option, and recommended the building of a Napier–Hastings motorway to provide quick access between the airport and Hastings.

The first section of the expressway, from Kennedy Road at Pirimai to Pakowhai Road, opened in the late 1960s, with raised approaches for a bridge over Kennedy Road being partially formed at the same time. Further construction (south of Pakowhai Road) did not start until the late 1990s. After the approaches for the Kennedy Road overbridge had stood each side of the dual carriageway from Napier to Taradale for several decades, work began to strengthen them and build the bridge in 2002. The section of expressway to Hawke's Bay Airport opened in late 2003. In 2007 the Meeanee Road interchange was built to grade separate that intersection. A new extension south of Flaxmere opened in 2011.

In 2019, the New Zealand Transport Agency approved renumbering of the entire expressway to SH 2. The formerly designated section of SH 2 via Napier and Hastings took a new designation of SH 51, with effect from 1 August.

== Four-Laning/Dual-Carriageway ==
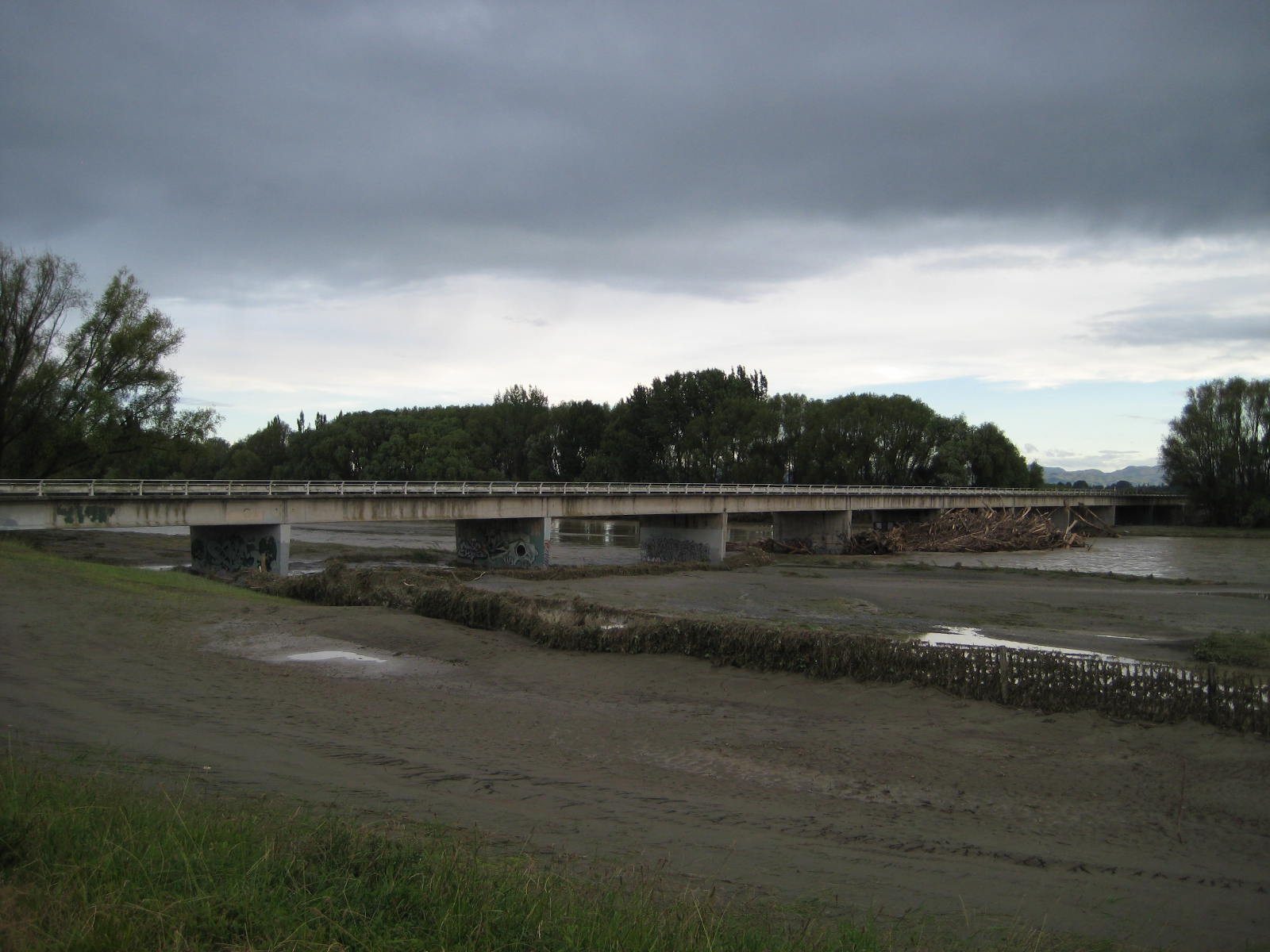
Bridge over the Tūtaekurī River

The expressway remains single carriageway along its length at present, although it has been designed to allow dual-carriageway upgrading. This became an electoral commitment by the National Party in the 2017 election as part of a series of national upgrades to roads, but the Party were not successful at forming a Government in the post-election coalition negotiations. It was a further commitment by the National Party in the 2020 election. In the 2023 election it was an electoral commitment by both the National Party and the Labour Party. This is the first time there has been bipartisan support for this roading upgrade. Initial works on the upgrade started in October 2024.

== Design ==
The Expressway is one lane in each direction, with, heading south, roundabouts at Prebensen Drive and Taradale Road and interchanges at Kennedy Road (north off, south on) and Meeanee Road (traffic lights for many years and a notorious black spot – replaced with a grade separated interchange in 2007), and roundabouts at Pakowhai Road/Links Road (previously traffic lights), Evenden Road, Omahu Road, Flaxmere Avenue/York Road, a 5-way roundabout with Maraekakaho Road/Longlands Road/Pakipaki Road and a roundabout at its terminus with SH 2 at Pakipaki. The expressway is entirely zoned at a 100 km/h limit.

== Major intersections ==
Territorial authority	Location	km	Jct	Destinations	Notes
Napier City	Westshore	0.0		Watchman Road; SH 2 north (Main North Road) – Napier Airport, Gisborne; Meeanee Quay (former SH 2 south) – City Centre	Hawke's Bay Expressway begins Hawke's Bay Expressway/SH 2 concurrency begins
Napier City	Onekawa	2.4		SH 50 north (Prebensen Road)	Hawke's Bay Expressway/SH 50 concurrency begins
Napier City	Onekawa	4.1		SH 51 (Taradale Road) – Clive, Hastings	Coastal route
Napier City	Pirimai	4.7		Kennedy Road	Northbound exit and southbound entry
Napier City	Jervoistown	7.8		Meeanee Road	Full diamond interchange
Napier City	Pakowhai	10.6		Pakowhai Road; SH 50 south (Links Road)	Hawke's Bay Expressway/SH 50 concurrency ends Staggered intersection converted to roundabout in 2018; To be replaced with a grade-separated interchange (overpass)
Hastings District	Hastings	15.8		Evenden Road	
Hastings District	Hastings	18.2		Omahu Road	
Hastings District	Flaxmere	20.0		York Road; Flaxmere Avenue	
Hastings District	Longlands	23.2		Longlands Road; Maraekakaho Road	
Hastings District	Pakipaki	27.2		Railway Road (former SH 2 north) – Hastings; Te Aute Road – Havelock North; SH 2 south – Waipukurau, Wellington	Hawke's Bay Expressway ends Hawke's Bay Expressway/SH 2 concurrency ends

== See also ==
- List of motorways and expressways in New Zealand
