= State Highway 35 (New Zealand) =

Road in New Zealand

State Highway 35

Route information
- Maintained by NZ Transport Agency Waka Kotahi
- Length: 334.0 km (207.5 mi)

Major junctions
- North end: SH 2 (Bridge Street) at Ōpōtiki
- South end: SH 2 (Main Road/Wharerata Road) near Gisborne

Location
- Country: New Zealand

Highway system
- New Zealand state highways; Motorways and expressways; List
← SH 34	→ SH 36

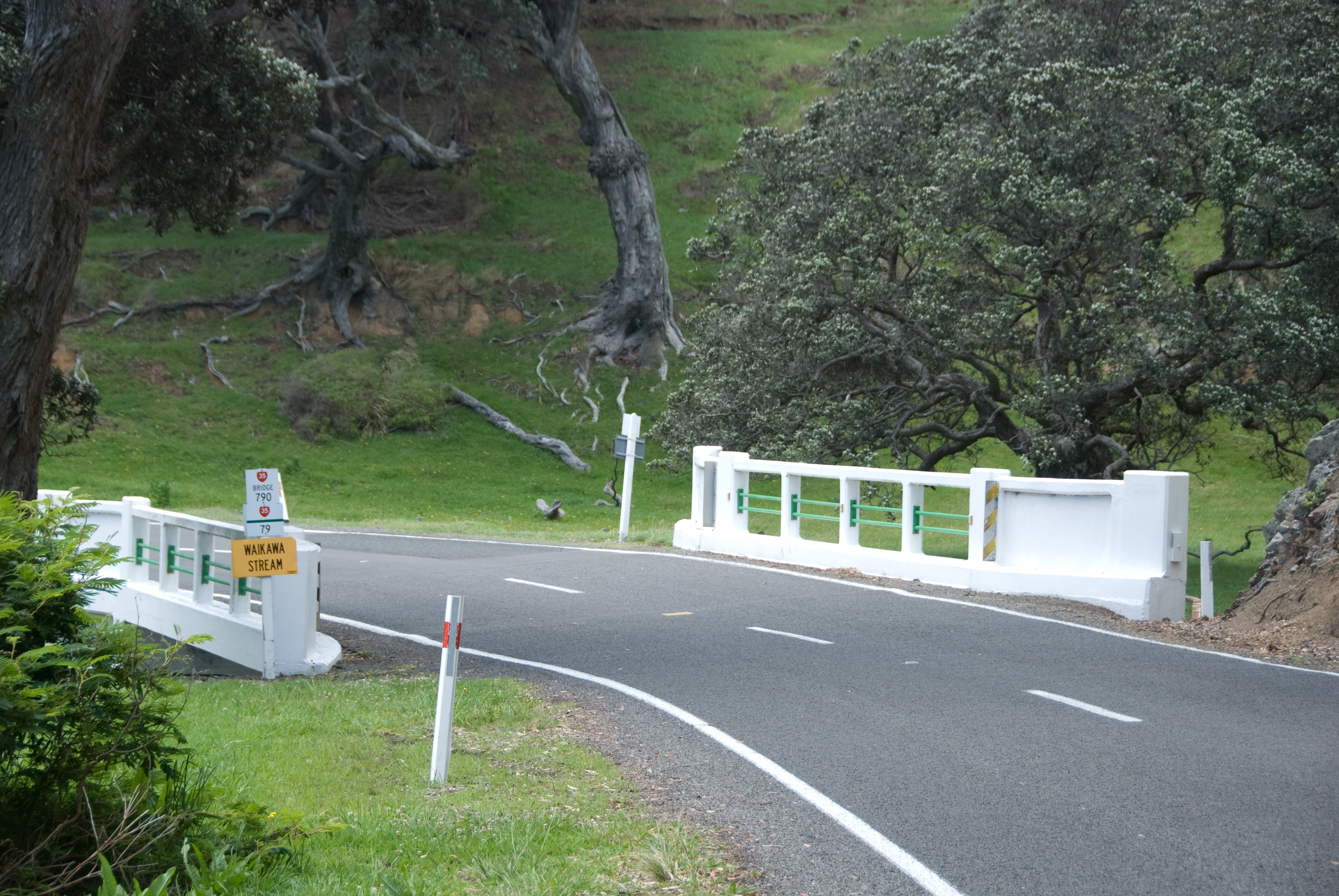
SH 35 at Waikawa Stream Bridge

State Highway 35 (SH 35) is a New Zealand state highway on the East Coast of the North Island. It is the main highway that services the East Cape of New Zealand as well as many other rural towns such as Hicks Bay, Ruatoria, Tolaga Bay, and the city of Gisborne.

SH 35 is the longest two-digit state highway at 334 kilometres (208 mi), longer than three single-digit highways (SH 4, SH 5 and SH 7). It is part of the Pacific Coast Highway.

== Route description ==
The route begins at SH 2 in Ōpōtiki in the Eastern Bay of Plenty and travels initially north along St John Street before turning sharp east. The road then begins its long route around the coast. After 157 km and at Te Araroa near Hicks Bay the road turns sharply right, although straight traffic may continue on to reach the East Cape. SH 35 continues on, past Ruatoria and then Tolaga Bay, home to New Zealand's longest wharf. 8 km near the end of its route, SH 35 crosses the Tūranganui River bridge and reaches Gisborne. SH 35 turns left onto Customhouse Street and then right onto Awapuni Road, the last stretch of road, before meeting back at SH 2 where it terminates.

== Route changes ==
There have been two notable changes to SH 35. It used to run through Wainui Beach before the construction of the bypass in 1990, and it used to run along Gladstone Road, Gisborne's main street. Since 1997, SH 35 now travels along Customhouse Street and Awapuni Road, diverting heavy traffic from the city centre.

== See also ==
- List of New Zealand state highways
