= List of New Zealand state highways =

This is a list of highways of the New Zealand state highway network and some touring routes. State highways are administered by NZ Transport Agency Waka Kotahi, while all other roads are the responsibility of territorial authorities.

== Current ==
=== North Island ===
No.	From	To	Via	Length (km)	Notes
State Highway 1 (New Zealand)	Cape Reinga	Wellington International Airport	Kaitaia, Whangārei, Auckland, Hamilton, Tīrau, Tokoroa, Taupō, Bulls, Levin, Wellington	1074	SH 1N is used in official documentation, SH 1 is used on maps and signs. The Interislander ferry connects State Highway 1N and State Highway 1S between Wellington and Picton.
(1B)	SH 1 at Taupiri	SH 1 at Cambridge	Gordonton	41.9	Forms an eastern bypass of Hamilton. Route currently incomplete due to closure of the Holland Road level crossing in April 2022.
(1C)	SH 1 at Horsham Downs	SH 1 at Tamahere	Hamilton	26	Formerly part of SH 1. SH 1 was rerouted onto the new Hamilton section of the Waikato Expressway in July 2022.
State Highway 2 (New Zealand)	SH 1 at Pōkeno (45 km south of Auckland)	SH 1 at Ngauranga (5 km north of Wellington)	Paeroa, Tauranga, Ōpōtiki, Gisborne, Wairoa, Napier, Hastings, Woodville, Masterton, Hutt Valley	968	
State Highway 3 (New Zealand)	SH 1C at Hamilton	SH 2 at Woodville	Te Awamutu, Ōtorohanga, Te Kūiti, New Plymouth, Whanganui, Palmerston North	489.1	6 km of the route through the Manawatū Gorge has been closed since 2017 due to landslips and was temporarily replaced by the route over the Saddle Road. The new highway through the gorge opened in June 2025.
(3A)	SH 3 near Waitara	SH 3 at Inglewood		15.6	Forms an eastern bypass of New Plymouth.
State Highway 4 (New Zealand)	SH 3 at Eight Mile Junction (11 km south of Te Kūiti)	SH 3 at Whanganui	Taumarunui, Ōwhango, National Park, Raetihi	236.5	
State Highway 5 (New Zealand)	SH 1 at Tīrau	SH 2 at Bay View (10 km north of Napier)	Rotorua, Taupō	247.4	
State Highway 10 (New Zealand)	SH 1 at Pakaraka (14 km north of Kawakawa)	SH 1 at Awanui	Waipapa, Kaeo, Taipa-Mangonui	103.8	
State Highway 11 (New Zealand)	SH 1 at Kawakawa	SH 10 at Puketona Junction	Opua, Paihia	34	
State Highway 12 (New Zealand)	SH 1 at Ōhaeawai (79 km south of Kaitaia)	SH 1 at Brynderwyn (28 km north of Wellsford)	Kaikohe, Ōmāpere, Waipoua Forest, Dargaville	217.8	
State Highway 14 (New Zealand)	SH 1 at Whangārei	SH 12 at Dargaville	Maungatapere	54.6	
State Highway 15 (New Zealand)	SH 1 near Lake Ōmāpere	Marsden Point	Kaikohe, Titoki, Maungatapere	126.5	The Northland Inland Freight Route. Was declared as a State Highway in August 2016 and includes the full section of former SH 15A to Marsden Point. This is the second instance of this highway number being used.
State Highway 16 (New Zealand)	Ports of Auckland	SH 1 at Wellsford	Northwestern Motorway, Kumeū, Waimauku, Helensville, Kaukapakapa	107.5	
State Highway 18 (New Zealand)	SH 1 at Rosedale	SH 16 at Massey	Upper Harbour Motorway	14.0	
State Highway 20 (New Zealand)	SH 1 at Manukau	SH 16 at Waterview	Southwestern Motorway	23.8	
(20A)	SH 20 south of Walmsley Road interchange	Auckland Airport		5.0	Provides northern access to Auckland Airport.
(20B)	SH 20 at Puhinui Road interchange	Auckland Airport		4.0	Provides eastern access to Auckland Airport.
State Highway 21 (New Zealand)	SH 1 at Tamahere	SH 3 near Hamilton Airport, (5 km south of Hamilton)	Hamilton Airport, Mystery Creek	6.7	
State Highway 22 (New Zealand)	SH 1 at Drury	Pukekohe	Paerata	12.9	The continuation south to SH 23 near Raglan had its State Highway designation revoked and is now known as Highway 22.
State Highway 23 (New Zealand)	SH 1C at Hamilton	Raglan	Whatawhata	42.7	
State Highway 24 (New Zealand)	SH 27 at Matamata	SH 29 near Te Poi		13	
State Highway 25 (New Zealand)	SH 2 3 km north of Mangatarata	SH 2 at Waihi	Thames, Coromandel, Whitianga, Tairua, Whangamatā	231	
(25A)	SH 25 at Kopu (6 km south of Thames)	SH 25 at Hikuai		28.2	Serves as a shortcut across the Coromandel Peninsula via the Kopu-Hikuai hill.
State Highway 26 (New Zealand)	SH 1 at Ruakura	SH 25 at Kopu, (6 km south of Thames)	Morrinsville, Te Aroha, Paeroa	96.2	Terminus was changed to the Ruakura interchange on the new Hamilton section of the Waikato Expressway in July 2022.
State Highway 27 (New Zealand)	SH 2 at Mangatarata	SH 1 at Tīrau	Waharoa, Matamata	92.4	
State Highway 28 (New Zealand)	SH 1 at Putāruru	SH 29 at the foot of the Kaimai Ranges	Tapapa	20.8	
State Highway 29 (New Zealand)	SH 1 (12 km west of Tīrau)	SH 2 at Tauranga	Tauriko	53.7	Crosses the Kaimai Ranges. Route K (Takitimu Drive) became part of the State Highway network in August 2015 and the highway follows this route terminating at SH 2 in Tauranga.
(29A)	SH 29/SH 36 near Tauriko	SH 2 at Mount Maunganui	Maungatapu	13.5	New designation introduced in August 2015. Follows the former eastern section of SH 29.
State Highway 30 (New Zealand)	SH 3 at Te Kūiti	Whakatāne	Benneydale, Mangakino, Whakamaru, Ātiamuri, Rotorua	219	Has the most concurrencies of any State Highway, sharing sections with SH 32, SH 1, SH 5, SH 34, and SH 2.
(30A)	SH 5 west of central Rotorua	SH 30 at Te Ngae	Rotorua Central	3.6	
State Highway 31 (New Zealand)	SH 3 at Ōtorohanga	Kawhia		56.4	14 km of the route is a concurrency with SH 39.
State Highway 32 (New Zealand)	SH 1 at Tokoroa	SH 41 at Kuratau Junction	Whakamaru	95.9	Traverses the western side of Lake Taupō.
State Highway 33 (New Zealand)	SH 2 at Paengaroa (9 km south-east of Te Puke)	SH 30 at Te Ngae (east of Rotorua)	Okere Falls	35.6	
State Highway 34 (New Zealand)	SH 2 near Edgecumbe	SH 30 west of Kawerau	Kawerau	25.2	
State Highway 35 (New Zealand)	SH 2 at Ōpōtiki	SH 2 near Gisborne	East Cape	334	The longest two-digit State Highway.
State Highway 36 (New Zealand)	SH 29 at Tauranga	SH 5 at Ngongotahā (10 km north of Rotorua)		48.0	Notable for being the first instance of a highway number being revoked and then re-gazetted in another location.
State Highway 37 (New Zealand)	SH 3 at Hangatiki	Waitomo Caves		7.3	
State Highway 38 (New Zealand)	SH 5 near Waiotapu	SH 2 at Wairoa	Murupara, Te Urewera National Park, Lake Waikaremoana	120.9	A middle section of 70km between Te Whaiti and Aniwaniwa is not a state highway.
State Highway 39 (New Zealand)	SH 1C at Te Rapa	SH 3 at Ōtorohanga	Whatawhata, Pirongia	65.3	Forms a western bypass of Hamilton. The last 14 km from the Kawhia turnoff (SH 31) to Ōtorohanga is a joint designation with SH 31.
State Highway 41 (New Zealand)	SH 4 at Manunui (6 km east of Taumarunui)	SH 1 at Tūrangi	Tokaanu, Kuratau Junction	58.6	
State Highway 43 (New Zealand)	SH 3 at Stratford	SH 4 at Taumarunui	Whangamōmona	148.7	Known as The Forgotten World Highway.
State Highway 44 (New Zealand)	SH 3 at New Plymouth	Port Taranaki		5.2	
State Highway 45 (New Zealand)	SH 3 at New Plymouth	SH 3 at Hāwera	Ōakura, Ōkato, Manaia, Ōpunake	104.6	Known as The Surf Highway.
State Highway 46 (New Zealand)	SH 1 at Rangipo	SH 47 near Papakai	Lake Rotoaira	19.1	
State Highway 47 (New Zealand)	SH 4 at National Park	SH 41 3 km north of Tūrangi	Tongariro National Park	46.4	
State Highway 48 (New Zealand)	SH 47 9 km from National Park	Whakapapa Village		6.8	Provides access to Tongariro National Park and Mount Ruapehu.
State Highway 49 (New Zealand)	SH 4 at Tohunga Junction	SH 1 at Waiouru	Ohakune, Rangataua, Tangiwai	36.2	
State Highway 50 (New Zealand)	Port of Napier	SH 2 near Takapau	Ahuriri, Fernhill, Tikokino	91.5	Alternative inland route through Hawke's Bay instead of using SH 2.
State Highway 51 (New Zealand)	SH 2 / SH 50 in Napier	Hastings	Clive	21.4	Gazetted in August 2019. Formerly part of the coastal route of SH 2 through Hawke's Bay.
State Highway 53 (New Zealand)	SH 2 at Featherston	Martinborough		17.8	Breaks with the general north-south pattern of the numbering, being some 200 km south of SH 54 and having the southernmost endpoints of any North Island state highway apart from SH 1 and SH 2.
State Highway 54 (New Zealand)	SH 3 near Palmerston North	SH 1 at Vinegar Hill	Feilding, Cheltenham	56.5	
State Highway 56 (New Zealand)	SH 57 at Makerua	Awapuni, Palmerston North	Opiki, Longburn	22.9	Terminates on Pioneer Highway but used to connect to SH 3 in central Palmerston North.
State Highway 57 (New Zealand)	SH 1 near Ōhau (2 km south of Levin)	SH 3 at Ashhurst (the western end of the Manawatū Gorge)	Linton Military Camp, Tokomaru, Shannon	63.5	
State Highway 58 (New Zealand)	SH 2 at Haywards	SH 59 at Paremata (near Porirua)	Pāuatahanui	15.3	Connects the Hutt Valley with Porirua via Haywards Hill.
State Highway 59 (New Zealand)	SH 1 at Mackays Crossing	SH 1 at Linden	Plimmerton, Porirua	26.2	Gazetted in December 2021. Formerly part of SH 1 before the opening of the Transmission Gully Motorway.

=== South Island ===
No.	From	To	Via	Length (km)	Notes
State Highway 1 (New Zealand)	Picton ferry terminal	Bluff	Blenheim, Kaikōura, Christchurch, Ashburton, Timaru, Oamaru, Dunedin, Balclutha, Gore, Invercargill	932	SH 1S is used in official documentation, SH 1 on maps and signs. The Interislander ferry connects State Highway 1N and State Highway 1S between Wellington and Picton.
State Highway 6 (New Zealand)	SH 1 at Blenheim	SH 1 at Invercargill	Havelock, Nelson, Murchison, Greymouth, Hokitika, Haast, Wānaka, Cromwell, Frankton (Queenstown)	1162.2	The longest single-island State Highway.
(6A)	SH 6 at Frankton	Queenstown		6.9	Provides a connection between SH 6, Queenstown International Airport and Queenstown central.
State Highway 7 (New Zealand)	SH 1 at Waipara (60 km north of Christchurch)	SH 6 at Greymouth	Culverden, Lewis Pass, Reefton	272.4	
(7A)	SH 7 at Waiau Bridge	Hanmer Springs		9.4	
State Highway 8 (New Zealand)	SH 1 at Timaru	SH 1 at Milton	Fairlie, Tekapo, Twizel, Lindis Pass, Cromwell, Alexandra	456.7	
(8A)	SH 8 at Tarras	SH 6 at Luggate		21	Connection to SH 6 north of Lake Dunstan.
(8B)	SH 8 at Deadmans Point	SH 6 at Cromwell		2.6	Connection to SH 6 south of Lake Dunstan.
State Highway 60 (New Zealand)	SH 6 near Richmond	Collingwood	Motueka, Tākaka	116.5	
State Highway 62 (New Zealand)	SH 1 at Spring Creek	SH 6 2 km north of Renwick	Rapaura	12.8	Provides a northern bypass of Blenheim and Renwick towards Nelson.
State Highway 63 (New Zealand)	SH 6 at Renwick	SH 6 at Kawatiri Junction	Wairau Valley, Saint Arnaud	117.3	
State Highway 65 (New Zealand)	SH 7 at Springs Junction	SH 6 11 km west of Murchison	Maruia	71.4	
State Highway 67 (New Zealand)	SH 6 near Westport	4 km east of Summerlea	Westport, Waimangaroa, Granity, Hector	52.3	The road continues for a further 44 km to Karamea, but not as a State Highway.
(67A)	SH 67 at Westport	Cape Foulwind	Carters Beach	9	
State Highway 69 (New Zealand)	SH 6 at Inangahua Junction	SH 7 at Reefton		33.3	
State Highway 71 (New Zealand)	SH 1 at Kaiapoi	Rangiora		6.4	
State Highway 73 (New Zealand)	SH 75 / SH 76 interchange near Hillmorton, Christchurch	SH 6 at Kumara Junction	West Melton, Darfield, Springfield, Porters Pass, Arthur's Pass	224	Known as the Great Alpine Highway
State Highway 74 (New Zealand)	SH 1 at Belfast	Lyttelton	Lyttelton road tunnel	28.8	Known as the Christchurch Northern Motorway until the Queen Elizabeth II Drive interchange and as the Christchurch–Lyttelton Motorway between the Ferry Road roundabout and Lyttelton.
(74A)	SH 76 at Brougham St / Garlands / Opawa Rds in Christchurch	SH 74 at Palinurus / Dyers Rds in Christchurch		2.1	Provides a shortcut between SH 76 and SH 74 through Woolston.
State Highway 75 (New Zealand)	SH 73 / SH 76 interchange near Hillmorton, Christchurch	Akaroa	Hillmorton, Halswell, Tai Tapu, Little River, Duvauchelle / Robinsons Bay	77.3	
State Highway 76 (New Zealand)	SH 74 at the Tunnel Rd / Port Hills Rd interchange in Christchurch	SH 1 near Templeton, Christchurch	Sydenham, Addington, Hillmorton	22.6	Known as the Christchurch Southern Motorway from Sydenham to Templeton.
State Highway 77 (New Zealand)	SH 1 at Ashburton	SH 73 at Darfield	Methven, Rakaia Gorge / Mount Hutt, Glentunnel / Coalgate	93.9	Includes part of Inland Scenic Route 72
State Highway 78 (New Zealand)	SH 1 at Timaru	Port Loop Road, Port of Timaru		0.9	The shortest State Highway, entirely within the city of Timaru.
State Highway 79 (New Zealand)	SH 1 at Rangitata	SH 8 at Fairlie	Geraldine	61.1	
State Highway 80 (New Zealand)	SH 8 south of Lake Pukaki	Mount Cook Village	Glentanner	54.6	
State Highway 82 (New Zealand)	SH 1 near Hook (Cup and Saucer Junction)	SH 83 at Kurow	Waimate	71.1	Runs parallel to SH 83 along the northern bank of the Waitaki River.
State Highway 83 (New Zealand)	SH 1 at Pukeuri	SH 8 at Omarama	Duntroon, Kurow, Otematata	109.5	Runs parallel to SH 82 along the southern bank of the Waitaki River.
State Highway 84 (New Zealand)	SH 6 3 km east of Wānaka	Wānaka central		2.6	Originally part of SH 89 (the Crown Range Road).
State Highway 85 (New Zealand)	SH 1 at Palmerston	SH 8 at Alexandra	Ranfurly, Omakau	164.3	
State Highway 86 (New Zealand)	SH 1 at Allanton	Dunedin Airport at Momona		5.3	
State Highway 87 (New Zealand)	SH 1 at Mosgiel	SH 85 at Kyeburn	Outram, Middlemarch, Hyde	114.2	
State Highway 88 (New Zealand)	SH 1 at Dunedin	Port Chalmers	Ravensbourne, St Leonards, Roseneath	12.7	
State Highway 90 (New Zealand)	SH 8 at Raes Junction	SH 1 at McNab (3 km east of Gore)	Tapanui	59.3	
State Highway 93 (New Zealand)	SH 1 at Clinton	SH 1 at Mataura		43.2	Provides a southern bypass of Gore.
State Highway 94 (New Zealand)	SH 1 at Gore	Milford Sound	Riversdale, Lumsden, Mossburn, Te Anau, Homer Tunnel	254.4	Known as the Milford Road, regarded as the most scenic road in New Zealand.
State Highway 95 (New Zealand)	SH 94 at Te Anau	Manapouri		20.5	Provides access to Fiordland National Park.
State Highway 96 (New Zealand)	SH 1 at Mataura	Ohai	Hedgehope, Browns, Winton, Nightcaps	89.8	Has a short concurrency with SH 6 in Winton. Remainder of route to SH 99 at Clifden is not signed as a state highway.
State Highway 97 (New Zealand)	SH 6 at Five Rivers	SH 94 at Mossburn		20.6	Provides a shortcut between SH 94 and SH 6.
State Highway 98 (New Zealand)	SH 6 at Lorneville	SH 1 near Dacre	Rakahouka	21.6	Provides a northern bypass of Invercargill.
State Highway 99 (New Zealand)	SH 6 at Lorneville	Clifden	Wallacetown, Riverton, Tuatapere	92.5	Remainder of route to SH 96 at Ohai is not signed as a state highway.

== Past ==
The following state highways have been decommissioned. After revocation these routes have reverted to their original names (e.g. Crown Range Road), are referred to by their old route number (e.g. Route 72), or have been given white shields.

No.	From	To	Via	Length (km)	Notes
1A	Silverdale	Orewa		6	The Auckland Northern Motorway section between Silverdale and Orewa now designated as SH 1, remainder of the route was revoked in 2009 due to further extension of the motorway to Puhoi.
1F	SH 1 and SH 10 at Awanui	Cape Reinga		103	Became part of an extended SH 1.
2A	SH 2 at Tauranga	SH 29A at Maungatapu		3.8	Revoked in August 2015
2B	SH 2 at Hawke's Bay Airport	SH 50 at Taradale		4.1	Northern part of Hawke's Bay Expressway. Renumbered as SH 2 in August 2019.
15	SH 1 at Whangārei	Port of Whangārei		4	Revoked in 2003 when the Port was moved to Marsden Point. SH 15 was later re gazetted in 2016 as part of the newly established Northland Inland Freight Route.
15A	SH 1 at Ruakākā	Marsden Point		8.5	Now part of State Highway 15 and the Northland Inland Freight Route.
17	SH 1 at Albany	SH 1 at Puhoi	Orewa	32.9	Formerly part of SH 1, was bypassed in 1999 (south of Silverdale) and 2009 (north of Silverdale). Revoked in 2012 due to the opening of the Northern Gateway Toll Road, which extended SH 1 north to Puhoi. Now known as the Dairy Flat Highway.
36	SH 2 at Patutahi	SH 38 at Frasertown	Tiniroto	83.4	Was revoked in 1990–91, but re-gazetted at its current location in 2004–2005.
40	SH 3 at Ahititi	SH 4 at Maungatupoto	Ōhura	90	Was revoked in 1991–92.
47A	SH 1 at Rangipo	SH 47 near Papakai		19	Now part of SH 46.
49A	SH 49 at Ohakune	SH 4 at Raetihi		9	Was revoked in 1991–92.
50A	SH 50 10 km from Napier	SH 2 at Pakipaki, 7 km from Hastings	Flaxmere	16.6	Formed the southern part of the Hawke's Bay Expressway. Renumbered as SH 2 in August 2019.
52	SH 2 at Waipukurau	SH 2 at Masterton	Pongaroa	215	Was revoked in 1990–91, now signed with a white shield as Route 52.
57A	SH 57 near Massey University, Palmerston North	SH 3 at the western entrance of the Manawatū Gorge		18.3	Now forms part of SH 57, which originally ran into central Palmerston North.
61	SH 60 at Motueka	SH 6 at Kohatu Junction	Motueka Valley	58	Was revoked in 1990–91.
70	SH 1 4 km south of Kaikōura	SH 7 at Red Post Junction (2 km north of Culverden)	Waiau	97	SH 70 north of Waiau was revoked in 1990–91. The remainder of the route was revoked in 2004 after the commencement of the tourist route Alpine Pacific Triangle. Now signed with a white shield as Inland Route 70.
72	SH 1 at Woodend	SH 1 near Temuka	Rangiora, Waimakariri Gorge, Rakaia Gorge, Geraldine	194	Was revoked in 1991–92. Now forms part of Inland Scenic Route, signed with a white shield as Route 72.
73A	SH 1 at Carmen/Main South Rds, Christchurch	SH 73 at Blenheim/Curtletts Rds, Christchurch		3.6	Originally formed part of SH 1, and then SH 73 until gazetted as SH 73A in January 2004. Was revoked in 2014 after completion of the first stage of the Christchurch Southern Motorway (SH 76).
89	SH 6 near Wānaka	SH 6 near Arrowtown	Cardrona	53	Was revoked in 1990–91. Now signed as the Crown Range Road and SH 84.
91	SH 1 at Balclutha	Kaitangata		13	Became part of SH 92 and then was revoked in 1990–91.
92	SH 1 at Balclutha	SH 1 at Invercargill	Owaka	176	Was revoked in 1990–91. Now forms The Catlins Route, part of the Southern Scenic Route.

== Future ==
The following state highways are planned to be commissioned:

No.	From	To	Via	Length (km)	Notes
19	SH 1 at Dairy Flat	Whangaparaoa Road at Stanmore Bay	Stillwater	7	Expected to become a new state highway as part of the Penlink project, currently under construction

== Unused numbers ==
The following numbers have never been used:

- North Island: SH 13, SH 19, SH 42, SH 55
- South Island: SH 9, SH 64, SH 66, SH 68, SH 81
