= State Highway 50 (New Zealand) =

Road in New Zealand

State Highway 50

Route information
- Maintained by NZ Transport Agency Waka Kotahi
- Length: 91.5 km (56.9 mi)

Major junctions
- North end: Port of Napier
- (Hyderabad Road) to SH 51 (Taradale Road/Hyderabad Road) in Napier; SH 2 north (Hawkes Bay Expressway) in Napier; SH 51 (Taradale Road) in Napier; SH 2 south (Hawkes Bay Expressway) near Hastings
- South end: SH 2 near Takapau

Location
- Country: New Zealand
- Towns: Napier, Fernhill, Maraekakaho, Tikokino

Highway system
- New Zealand state highways; Motorways and expressways; List
← SH 49	→ SH 51

State Highway 50 (SH 50) is a New Zealand state highway that runs through the Hawke's Bay Region.

== Route ==
SH 50 begins at the Port of Napier travelling down Breakwater Road, Ahuriri Bypass and Hyderabad Road turning west onto Prebensen Drive. It then intersects SH 2, running concurrent with SH 2 and the Hawke's Bay Expressway and heads southbound leaving Napier city. At the intersection with Links Road it turns west, leaving the expressway and continuing on rural road via Fernhill, Maraekakaho and Tikokino before terminating at SH 2 near Takapau.

== Major intersections ==
Territorial authority	Location	km	mi	Destinations	Notes
Napier City	Napier	0	0.0	Port of Napier; Breakwater Road	SH 50 begins
Napier City	Napier	4.2	2.6	SH 2 north (Hawke's Bay Expressway) – Napier Airport, Gisborne	SH 50/SH 2 concurrency begins
Napier City	Napier	6.9	4.3	SH 51 (Taradale Road) – City Centre, Clive, Hastings	
Hastings District	Pakowhai	13.2	8.2	Pakowhai Road; SH 2 south (Hawke's Bay Expressway) – Hastings	SH 50/SH 2 concurrency ends Staggered intersection converted to roundabout in 2018
Central Hawke's Bay District	Takapau	91.5	56.9	SH 2 north – Waipukurau, Hastings; SH 2 south – Dannevirke	SH 50 ends
Concurrency terminus

== Spur section and route changes ==
State Highway 50A (SH 50A) was a spur section covering the southern section of the Hawke's Bay Expressway. It covered from the intersection of Links Road at SH 50, travelling in a general south-west direction between Hastings and Flaxmere and terminated at the intersection of Paki Paki Road and Railway Road. SH 2 took over this designation in 2019. SH50 was also diverted onto Prebensen Drive at the same time with the old route along Taradale Rd becoming SH51.

== See also ==
- List of New Zealand state highways
