= Classic New Zealand Wine Trail =

Highway route in New Zealand

Classic New Zealand Wine Trail

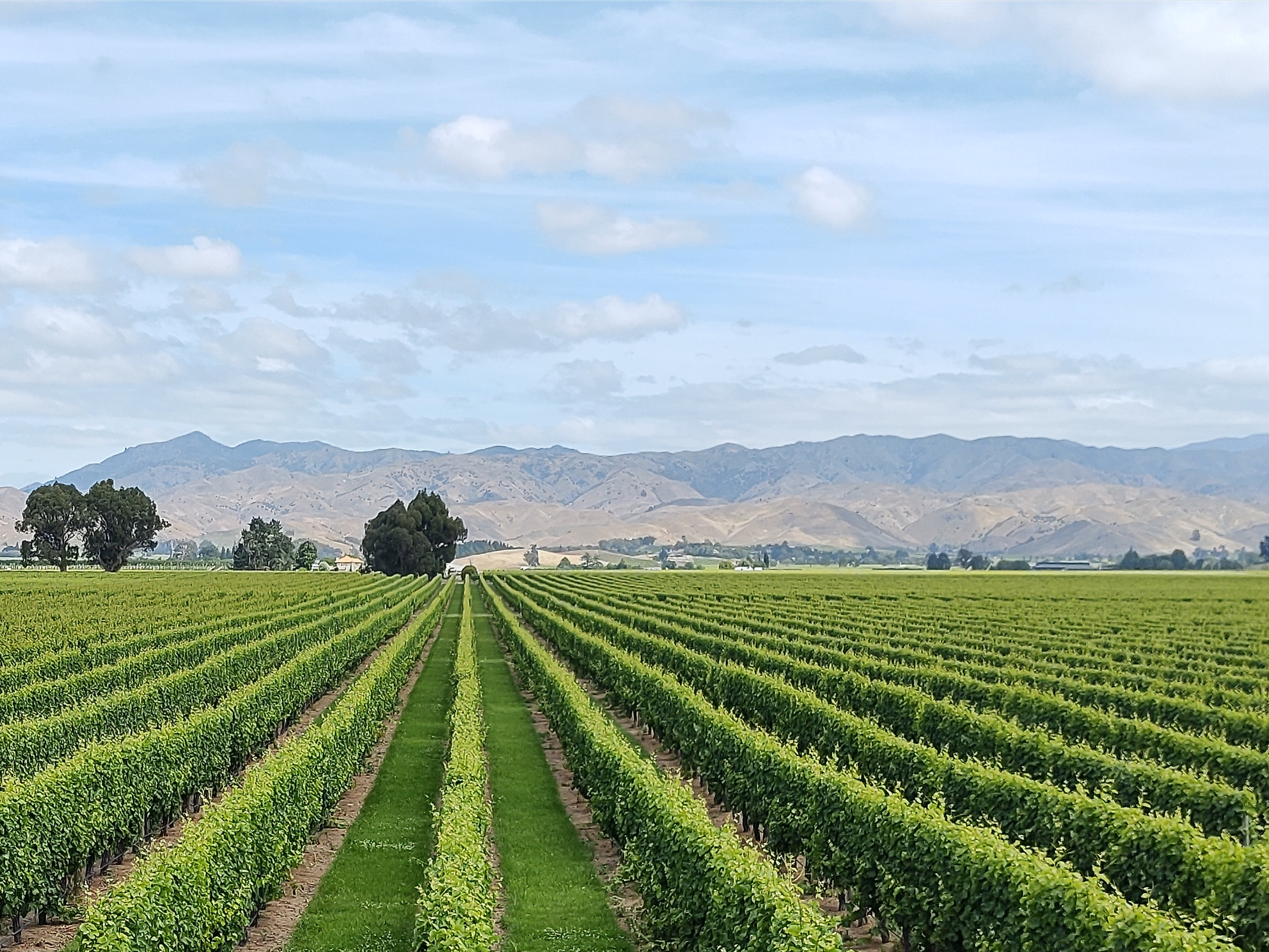
- Vineyards in Marlborough wine region, looking south from Raupara Road

Route information
- Length: 380 km (240 mi)

Location
- Country: New Zealand
- Primary destinations: Hawke's Bay; Central Hawke's Bay; Wairarapa; Martinborough; Wellington; Marlborough

Highway system
- New Zealand state highways; Motorways and expressways; List

The Classic New Zealand Wine Trail is a 380-kilometre (240 mi) tourist road route in New Zealand that covers both the Hawke's Bay and Wairarapa regions of the North Island, as well as the Marlborough District of the South Island, connected by the Cook Strait ferry crossing. The route traverses the principal New Zealand wine regions of Hawke's Bay, Wairarapa, and Marlborough, which together represent about 80 percent of the country's total production.

== Route ==
The North Island route follows State Highway 51 (SH 51) between Napier and Hastings, then SH 2 between Hastings and Wellington, with a short detour through the Wairarapa town of Martinborough. In the South Island, the route follows SH 1 between the Cook Strait ferry terminal in Picton and Seddon, south of Blenheim. The route is popular with tourists, and an online itinerary includes more than 200 wineries and cellar doors, as well as tied-in accommodation, tours and events.
