= State Highway 51 (New Zealand) =

Road in New Zealand

State Highway 51

Route information
- Maintained by NZ Transport Agency Waka Kotahi
- Length: 21.2 km (13.2 mi)

Major junctions
- North end: SH 2 / SH 50 (Hawke's Bay Expressway) near Napier
- (Hyderabad Road) to SH 50 (Hyderabad Road/Prebensen Drive) in Napier
- South end: Kenilworth Road in Hastings

Location
- Country: New Zealand
- Primary destinations: Clive

Highway system
- New Zealand state highways; Motorways and expressways; List
← SH 50	→ SH 52

State Highway 51 (SH 51) is a New Zealand state highway that runs between Napier and Hastings via Clive. Known locally as the Coastal Route, it was the main route between the two cities prior to the completion of the Hawke's Bay Expressway.

== History ==
The route that SH 51 follows is part of the original route between Napier and Hastings, and prior to 1 August 2019 formed part of SH 2.

Between the late 1960s and 2011, the nearby Hawke's Bay Expressway was constructed, providing a high-speed bypass of Napier and Hastings. As the expressway was constructed in seven sections over 43 years, it had three separate state highway numbers (SH 2B, SH 50 and SH 50A), despite the expressway being a single length of road and being considered the spine of the Hawke's Bay roading network. This resulted in a confusing driving experience for motorists, made even more so when 9.8 kilometres (6.1 mi) of SH 2 between the northern outskirts of Hastings and the southern terminus of the expressway at Pakipaki was revoked in 2005.

In 2019, an opportunity to renumber the Hawke's Bay state highways arose through the exchange of Meeanee Quay and Pandora Road in Napier (part of SH 2) becoming a local road under the authority of the Napier City Council, and nearby Prebensen Drive becoming a state highway under the authority of the New Zealand Transport Agency. On 1 August 2019, the renumbering took effect:

- The entire Hawke's Bay Expressway became SH 2. SH 2B and SH 50A were revoked, while SH 50 continued to run over a section of the expressway, and was co-signed with SH 2 over this section.
- The former SH 2 between Napier and Hastings became SH 51, remaining a state highway alternative to the Hawke's Bay Expressway.
- Taradale Road, Hyderabad Road and Georges Drive, previously part of SH 50, also became part of SH 51, with SH 50 being shifted to run via Prebensen Drive.

The creation of SH 51 affected approximately 120 people and businesses with an address change along two sections of the route where the name of the road was the state highway number. Their addresses were automatically changed from State Highway 2 to State Highway 51 by New Zealand Post.

== Route ==
SH 51 leaves the Hawke's Bay Expressway at a roundabout west of Napier. It initially heads to the north-east on Taradale Road, before following Hyderabad Road for a short distance. It then runs to the south of the Napier city centre along Georges Drive.

SH 51 then meets the Hawke's Bay coast and turns south. The route leaves Napier and follows the coast before heading inland at the Ngaruroro River estuary. It runs through the small town of Clive and passes to the east of Whakatu before turning towards Hastings at a roundabout at Mangateretere.

Approaching Hastings from the north-east, the SH 51 designation ends in the outskirts of Hastings at the Kenilworth Road intersection. The route continues into central Hastings as Karamu Road North.

== Major intersections ==
Territorial authority	Location	km	jct	Destinations	Notes
Napier City	Onekawa	0		SH 2 north (Hawke's Bay Expressway) / SH 50 north (Hawke's Bay Expressway) – Taupō, Gisborne; SH 2 south (Hawke's Bay Expressway) / SH 50 south (Hawke's Bay Expressway) – Hastings; Classic New Zealand Wine Trail (Taradale Road) – Tamatea	SH 51 begins 39°30′38″S 176°52′36″E
Napier City	Marewa	2.3		Palmerston North–Gisborne Line	
Napier City	Marewa	2.4		Hyderabad Road – Port, Taupō, Gisborne, Tamatea	To
Napier City	Marewa	2.9		Thackeray Street – City Centre	
Napier City	Marewa	3.0		Palmerston North–Gisborne Line	
Napier City	Te Awa	5.1		Palmerston North–Gisborne Line	
Napier City	Te Awa	5.1		Marine Parade – City Centre	
Napier City	Awatoto	10.9		Tūtaekurī River	
Hastings District	Pakowhai	10.9		Tūtaekurī River	
Hastings District	Clive	11.6		Ngaruroro River	
Hastings District	Clive	13.4		Clive River	
Hastings District	Clive	14.2		Mill Road – Haumoana, Te Awanga	Mill Road provides a route to Cape Kidnappers from Napier
Hastings District	Mangateretere	18.3		Pilcher Road – Waimārama, Haumoana; Napier Road – Havelock North; Whakatu Arterial Link – Whakatu	Pilcher Road provides a route to Cape Kidnappers from Hastings; Whakatu Arterial Link provides a route to SH 2 (Hawke's Bay Expressway)
Hastings District	Waipatu	21.2		Kenilworth Road	SH 51 ends 39°37′55″S 176°51′52″E; Route continues into central Hastings as Karamu Road North
Hastings District	Mayfair	21.2		Kenilworth Road	SH 51 ends 39°37′55″S 176°51′52″E; Route continues into central Hastings as Karamu Road North

== See also ==
- List of New Zealand state highways
