= Bay View, New Zealand =

Settlement in Hawke's Bay Region, New Zealand

Bay View
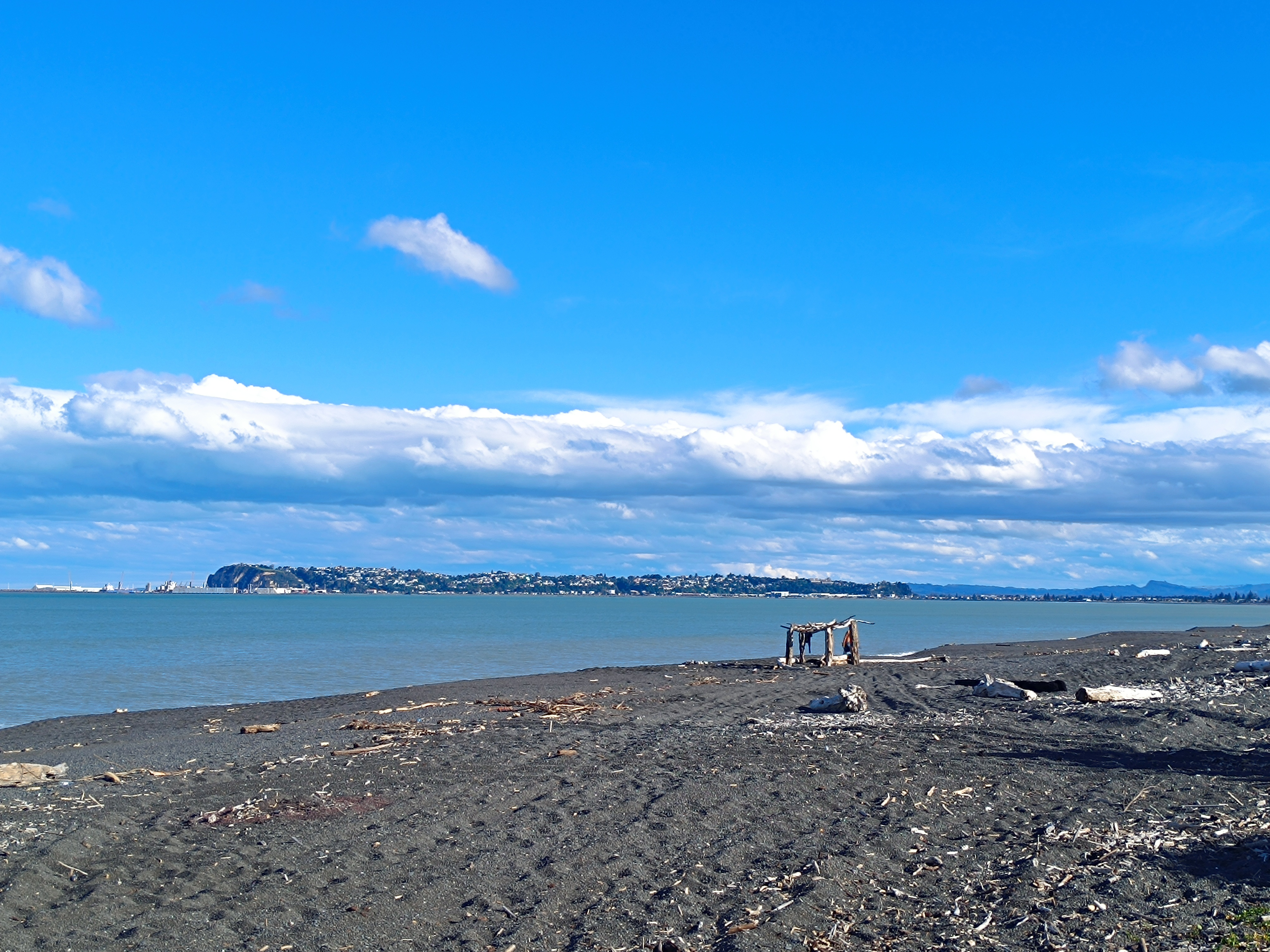
- Napier seen from Napier from Bay View beach
- Interactive map of Bay View
- Coordinates: 39.428°S 176.857°E
- Country: New Zealand
- Region: Hawke's Bay
- Territorial authority: Napier City
- Ward: Ahuriri Ward
- Electorates: Napier; Ikaroa-Rāwhiti (Māori)

Government
  - Territorial Authority: Napier City Council
  - Regional council: Hawke's Bay Regional Council
  - Mayor of Napier: Richard McGrath
  - Napier MP: Katie Nimon
  - Ikaroa-Rāwhiti MP: Cushla Tangaere-Manuel

Area
  - Total: 29.22 km^{2} (11.28 sq mi)

Population (June 2025)
  - Total: 2,290
  - Density: 78.4/km^{2} (203/sq mi)

Bay View, previously known as Kai-arero and Petane, is a settlement in the Hawke's Bay region of the eastern North Island of New Zealand. It lies on State Highway 2, nine kilometres north of the city centre of Napier. The Esk River flows into the sea just to the north. Hawke's Bay Airport and the Napier suburb of Westshore lie just to the south. Bay View has been administered by the Napier City Council since the 1989 local government reforms.

== History ==
In 1826, the Māori rangatira (chief) Tuakiaki ate the tongue of his brother-in-law Te Mautaranui of Ngāi Tūhoe, whom he had killed in revenge for an earlier murder, at Bay View. In memory of this event, the location was named Kai-arero ("eating of the tongue").

William Colenso of the Church Missionary Society established a mission outstation named Bethany near the mouth of the Esk River. Māori transliterated Bethany as Pētane and this became the name of the wider area. Pētane was seized by Māori in the early 1860s with the idea of attacking Napier. The name of the area was changed to Bay View in 1924 to avoid confusion with Petone in the Wellington region.

== Demographics ==
Bay View covers 29.22 km^{2} (11.28 sq mi) and had an estimated population of 2,290 as of June 2025, with a population density of 78 people per km^{2}.

Historical population
Year	Pop.	±% p.a.
2006	1,773	—
2013	1,920	+1.14%
2018	2,238	+3.11%
2023	2,298	+0.53%

Bay View had a population of 2,298 in the 2023 New Zealand census, an increase of 60 people (2.7%) since the 2018 census, and an increase of 378 people (19.7%) since the 2013 census. There were 1,134 males, 1,152 females, and 9 people of other genders in 855 dwellings. 2.3% of people identified as LGBTIQ+. The median age was 48.3 years (compared with 38.1 years nationally). There were 399 people (17.4%) aged under 15 years, 294 (12.8%) aged 15 to 29, 1,116 (48.6%) aged 30 to 64, and 489 (21.3%) aged 65 or older.

People could identify as more than one ethnicity. The results were 87.5% European (Pākehā); 19.8% Māori; 1.6% Pasifika; 3.0% Asian; 0.5% Middle Eastern, Latin American and African New Zealanders (MELAA); and 2.6% other, which includes people giving their ethnicity as "New Zealander". English was spoken by 97.7%, Māori by 3.4%, Samoan by 0.4%, and other languages by 4.8%. No language could be spoken by 1.2% (e.g. too young to talk). New Zealand Sign Language was known by 0.5%. The percentage of people born overseas was 14.4, compared with 28.8% nationally.

Religious affiliations were 28.2% Christian, 0.4% Hindu, 0.1% Islam, 1.3% Māori religious beliefs, 0.4% Buddhist, 0.7% New Age, 0.1% Jewish, and 0.7% other religions. People who answered that they had no religion were 62.0%, and 6.4% of people did not answer the census question.

Of those at least 15 years old, 399 (21.0%) people had a bachelor's or higher degree, 1,095 (57.7%) had a post-high school certificate or diploma, and 411 (21.6%) people exclusively held high school qualifications. The median income was $42,700, compared with $41,500 nationally. 243 people (12.8%) earned over $100,000 compared to 12.1% nationally. The employment status of those at least 15 was 936 (49.3%) full-time, 279 (14.7%) part-time, and 36 (1.9%) unemployed.

== See also ==
Bay View railway station
