= Waihua River =

- Route of the Waihua River
- Mouth of the Waihua River Waihua River (North Island)
- Native name: Waihua (Māori)

Location
- Country: New Zealand
- Island: North Island
- Region: Hawke's Bay
- District: Wairoa

Physical characteristics
- Source
  - coordinates: 38.9669°S 177.06395°E
- Mouth: Hawke Bay
  - coordinates: 39°05′33″S 177°17′10″E
  - elevation: 0 m (0 ft)
- Length: 25 km (16 mi)

Basin features
- Progression: Waihua River → Hawke Bay → Pacific Ocean
- Tributaries
  - left: Wairama Stream, Waitahora Stream, Waihī Stream, Kiakia Stream
  - right: Pōhue Stream, Ngāmāhanga Stream, Te Kiwi Stream
- Bridges: Waihua River Bridge

The Waihua River is a river of the northern Hawke's Bay region of New Zealand's North Island. Its course roughly parallels that of its northern neighbour, the Waiau River. The Waihua rises in rough hill country north of Raupunga, flowing initially east before turning southeast to reach Hawke Bay 15 kilometres west of Wairoa.

The New Zealand Ministry for Culture and Heritage gives a translation of "fish roe waters" for Waihua.

== See also ==
- List of rivers of New Zealand
