= Tikokino =

Settlement in Hawke's Bay Region, New Zealand

Tikokino Hampdon
- Town
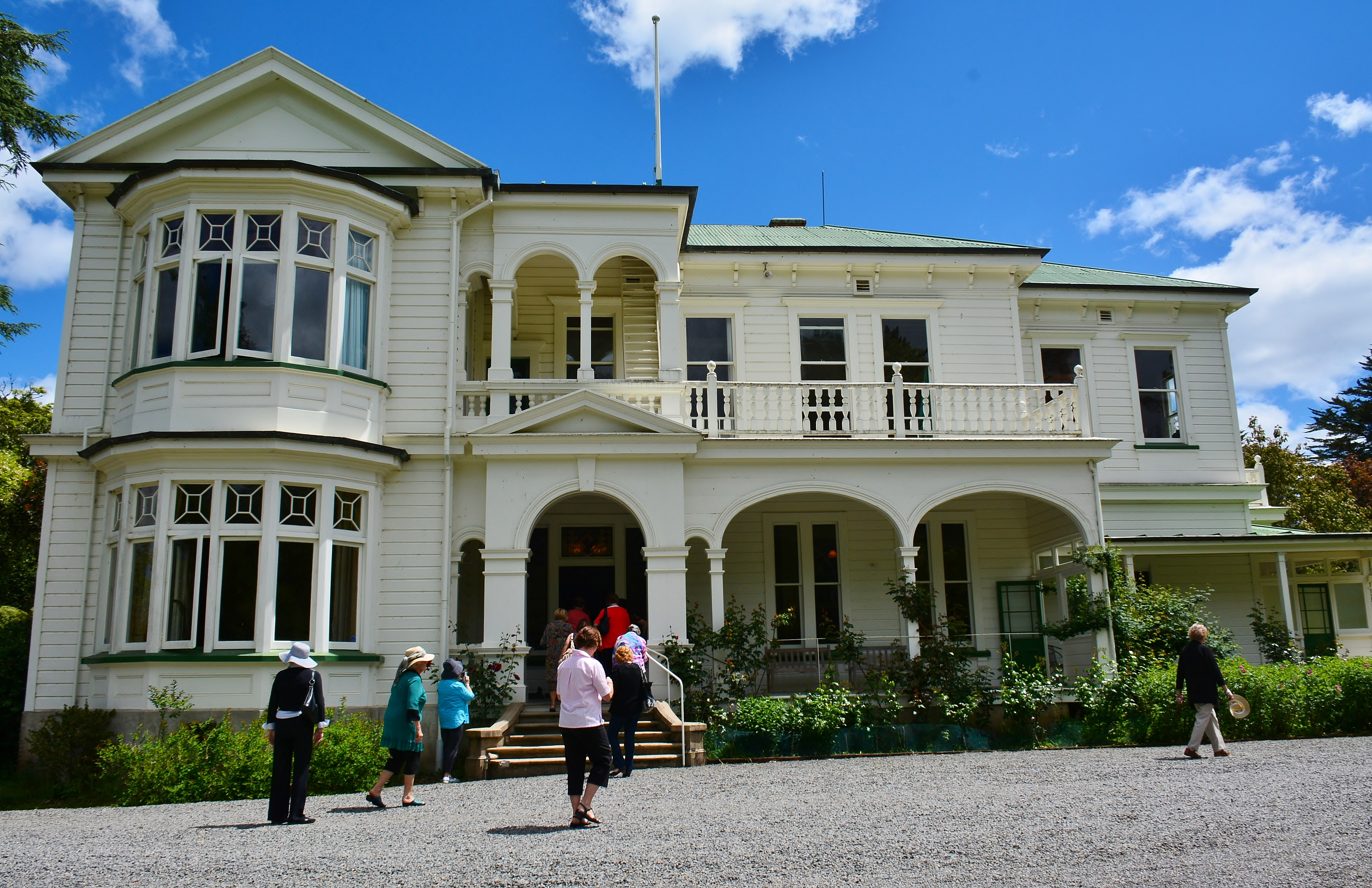
- Gwavas Station Homestead
- Interactive map of Tikokino
- Coordinates: 39°49′S 176°27′E
- Country: New Zealand
- Region: Hawke's Bay
- Territorial authority: Central Hawke's Bay District
- Ward: Aramoana-Ruahine
- Electorates: Tukituki; Ikaroa-Rāwhiti (Māori)

Government
  - Territorial Authority: Central Hawke's Bay District Council
  - Regional council: Hawke's Bay Regional Council
  - Mayor of Central Hawke's Bay: Will Foley
  - Tukituki MP: Catherine Wedd
  - Ikaroa-Rāwhiti MP: Cushla Tangaere-Manuel

Area
  - Total: 0.78 km^{2} (0.30 sq mi)

Population (June 2025)
  - Total: 240
  - Density: 310/km^{2} (800/sq mi)
- Postcode(s): 4273

Tikokino is a town in the Central Hawke's Bay District on the east coast of the North Island of New Zealand. It is located 20 kilometres (12 mi) northwest of Waipawa and 55 kilometres (34 mi) southwest of Hastings. The township is located on State Highway 50.

The township was founded by the Government in 1860. Hampden, as it was originally called, began as sawmilling centre for local forests, becoming a service town for the farms which took their place. By the early 2000s, most residents were working at a nearby meat processing plant, dairy farming, or for local growers.

Tikokino has eight buildings registered by Heritage New Zealand, including the Gwavas Station Homestead and Garden as Category I.

== Demographics ==
Statistics New Zealand describes Tikokino as a rural settlement, which covers 0.78 km^{2} (0.30 sq mi). It had an estimated population of 240 as of June 2025, with a population density of 308 people per km^{2}. It is part of the larger Mangaonuku statistical area.

Historical population for Tikokino
| Year | Pop. | ±% p.a. |
|---|---|---|
| 2006 | 147 | — |
| 2013 | 165 | +1.66% |
| 2018 | 192 | +3.08% |
| 2023 | 234 | +4.04% |

Tikokino had a population of 234 in the 2023 New Zealand census, an increase of 42 people (21.9%) since the 2018 census, and an increase of 69 people (41.8%) since the 2013 census. There were 114 males, 117 females, and 3 people of other genders in 93 dwellings. 3.8% of people identified as LGBTIQ+. The median age was 47.2 years (compared with 38.1 years nationally). There were 39 people (16.7%) aged under 15 years, 36 (15.4%) aged 15 to 29, 123 (52.6%) aged 30 to 64, and 36 (15.4%) aged 65 or older.

People could identify as more than one ethnicity. The results were 93.6% European (Pākehā); 12.8% Māori; 1.3% Pasifika; 1.3% Middle Eastern, Latin American and African New Zealanders (MELAA); and 5.1% other, which includes people giving their ethnicity as "New Zealander". English was spoken by 96.2%, Māori by 2.6%, Samoan by 1.3%, and other languages by 1.3%. No language could be spoken by 2.6% (e.g. too young to talk). New Zealand Sign Language was known by 1.3%. The percentage of people born overseas was 19.2, compared with 28.8% nationally.

Religious affiliations were 25.6% Christian, 1.3% New Age, and 1.3% other religions. People who answered that they had no religion were 62.8%, and 6.4% of people did not answer the census question.

Of those at least 15 years old, 36 (18.5%) people had a bachelor's or higher degree, 99 (50.8%) had a post-high school certificate or diploma, and 54 (27.7%) people exclusively held high school qualifications. The median income was $37,100, compared with $41,500 nationally. 9 people (4.6%) earned over $100,000 compared to 12.1% nationally. The employment status of those at least 15 was 102 (52.3%) full-time, 30 (15.4%) part-time, and 3 (1.5%) unemployed.

=== Mangaonuku statistical area ===
Mangaonuku statistical area covers 536.56 km^{2} (207.17 sq mi) and had an estimated population of 980 as of June 2025, with a population density of 1.8 people per km^{2}.

Historical population for Mangaonuku
| Year | Pop. | ±% p.a. |
|---|---|---|
| 2006 | 864 | — |
| 2013 | 834 | −0.50% |
| 2018 | 948 | +2.60% |
| 2023 | 936 | −0.25% |

Mangaonuku had a population of 936 in the 2023 New Zealand census, a decrease of 12 people (−1.3%) since the 2018 census, and an increase of 102 people (12.2%) since the 2013 census. There were 498 males, 435 females, and 3 people of other genders in 375 dwellings. 1.9% of people identified as LGBTIQ+. The median age was 41.7 years (compared with 38.1 years nationally). There were 198 people (21.2%) aged under 15 years, 153 (16.3%) aged 15 to 29, 435 (46.5%) aged 30 to 64, and 150 (16.0%) aged 65 or older.

People could identify as more than one ethnicity. The results were 90.4% European (Pākehā); 19.6% Māori; 2.2% Pasifika; 0.6% Asian; 0.3% Middle Eastern, Latin American and African New Zealanders (MELAA); and 1.9% other, which includes people giving their ethnicity as "New Zealander". English was spoken by 96.8%, Māori by 5.8%, Samoan by 0.3%, and other languages by 2.9%. No language could be spoken by 3.2% (e.g. too young to talk). New Zealand Sign Language was known by 0.6%. The percentage of people born overseas was 13.1, compared with 28.8% nationally.

Religious affiliations were 30.8% Christian, 1.3% Māori religious beliefs, 0.3% New Age, and 1.0% other religions. People who answered that they had no religion were 60.6%, and 6.4% of people did not answer the census question.

Of those at least 15 years old, 141 (19.1%) people had a bachelor's or higher degree, 438 (59.3%) had a post-high school certificate or diploma, and 159 (21.5%) people exclusively held high school qualifications. The median income was $41,000, compared with $41,500 nationally. 57 people (7.7%) earned over $100,000 compared to 12.1% nationally. The employment status of those at least 15 was 402 (54.5%) full-time, 123 (16.7%) part-time, and 9 (1.2%) unemployed.

== Marae ==
The local Rakautātahi Marae is a tribal meeting ground for local Māori, with a meeting house called Te Poho o Te Whatuiapiti. The marae is affiliated with the Ngāti Kahungunu hapū of Ngāi Toroiwaho, Ngāi Te Kikiri o Te Rangi, Ngāi Toroiwaho, Rangi Te Kahutia and Rangitotohu, and with the Rangitāne hapū of Ngāi Tahu and Ngāti Rangitotohu.

In October 2020, the Government committed $887,291 from the Provincial Growth Fund to upgrade the marae and 4 others, creating 12 jobs.

== Education ==
Tikokino School is a Year 1–8 co-educational state primary school. It is a decile 7 school with a roll of 82 as of July 2026. The school opened in 1866.

== Notable people ==
- Bill Collins (1911-93), Poverty Bay and Hawkes Bay rugby union representative and All Black (1935-36)
- Alice May Parkinson (1889–1949), New Zealand murderer
