= Westshore, New Zealand =

Suburb of Napier, New Zealand

Westshore
- Suburb
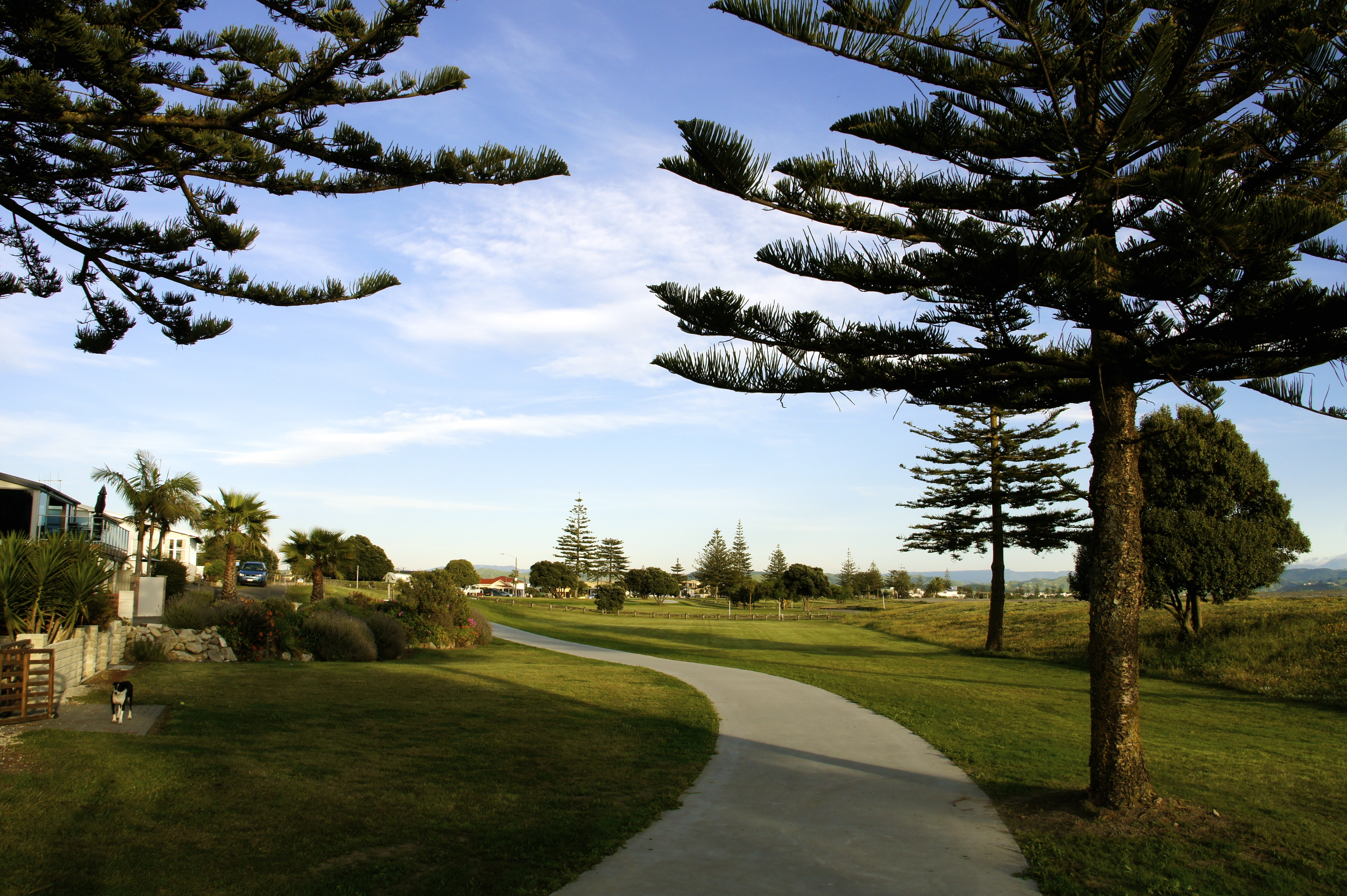
- Westshore Beach Reserve
- Interactive map of Westshore
- Coordinates: 39.4778°S 176.8823°E
- Country: New Zealand
- City: Napier
- Local authority: Napier City Council
- Electoral ward: Ahuriri Ward

Area
  - Land: 93 ha (230 acres)

Population (June 2025)
  - Total: 1,180
  - Density: 1,300/km^{2} (3,300/sq mi)
- Airports: Hawke's Bay Airport

Bay View		(Hawke Bay)
	Westshore
Poraiti	Onekawa	Ahuriri

Westshore is a northern coastal suburb of the city of Napier in Hawke's Bay, New Zealand.

== History ==
The first European settlers built houses on Westshore in 1850, when it was little more than a sandspit. Prior to the 1931 Hawke's Bay earthquake, Westshore was already a popular seaside resort, a long-time popular spot for yachting and boating activities. In 1931 the earthquake struck Napier, reclaiming the Ahuriri Lagoon. This freed up land and allowed Westshore to expand as a suburb, as previously a narrow shingle spit was the only land available. The earthquake also transformed the previously dangerous and shingly seashore into a safe and sandy swimming beach. Projects such as beach front beautification, landscaping and other improvements have helped to make Westshore one of the most popular and preferred beaches in Napier.

The Napier Swimming and Lifesaving Club was amongst the earliest Surf Lifesaving Clubs active in New Zealand, beginning in the 1910s. In October, 1958 the new Surf Section of the Napier Swimming and Lifesaving Club commenced patrols at Westshore Beach which, with improved access, had become the preferred swimming beach for the Napier public. The members of this new section wanted to form their own club, and on 28 October 1959 the Westshore Surf Lifesaving Club was formed. The Club operates from a two-story clubrooms building which opened in 1963 near the beachfront. Westshore is patrolled by surf-lifesavers in the summer months.

== Geography ==
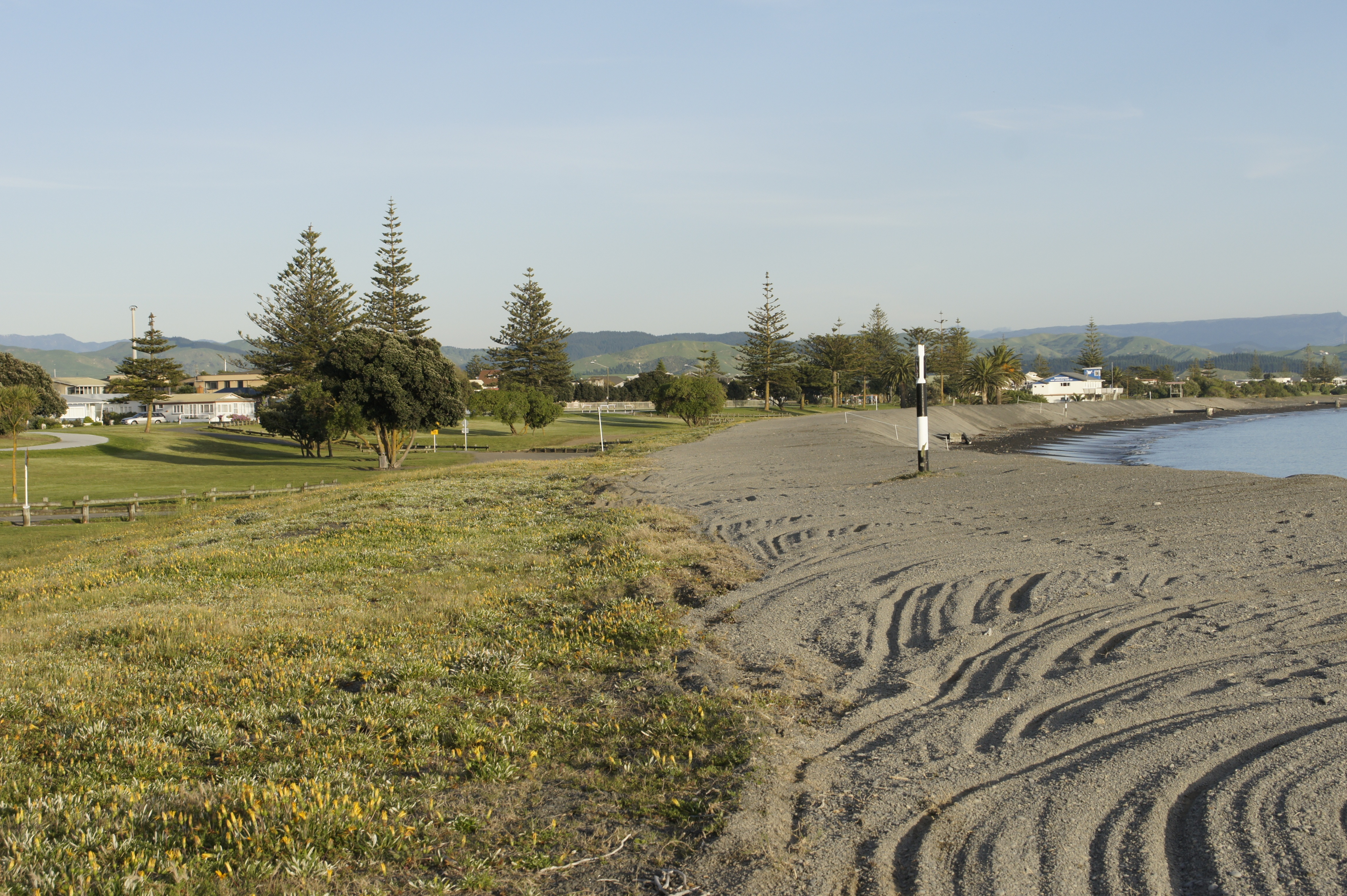
Westshore Beach

Westshore is located on the northern coast of Napier on the shores of the Hawke Bay. The 1931 earthquake freed up land which was previously underwater as part of the Ahuriri lagoon, and transformed the once dangerous shingle shore into a safe and sandy beach. Recreational activities popular at Westshore beach include swimming, picnicking and sunbathing. The earthquake raised the coastal land around Napier by about two metres. With the land that was made available, housing in Westshore increased, and there are also many motels in the suburb. Reclaimed land also includes the land on which the Hawke's Bay Airport was built. Westshore is one of Napier's most popular beaches. Relative to the steep and shingle beach on the foreshore of Marine Parade, Westshore is the more preferred swimming beach in Napier.

== Demographics ==
Westshore covers 0.93 km^{2} (0.36 sq mi) and had an estimated population of 1,180 as of June 2025, with a population density of 1,269 people per km^{2}.

Historical population
Year	Pop.	±% p.a.
2006	1,074	—
2013	1,059	−0.20%
2018	1,143	+1.54%
2023	1,167	+0.42%

Westshore had a population of 1,167 in the 2023 New Zealand census, an increase of 24 people (2.1%) since the 2018 census, and an increase of 108 people (10.2%) since the 2013 census. There were 561 males, 603 females, and 3 people of other genders in 525 dwellings. 2.8% of people identified as LGBTIQ+. The median age was 52.7 years (compared with 38.1 years nationally). There were 156 people (13.4%) aged under 15 years, 174 (14.9%) aged 15 to 29, 504 (43.2%) aged 30 to 64, and 330 (28.3%) aged 65 or older.

People could identify as more than one ethnicity. The results were 85.6% European (Pākehā); 18.0% Māori; 1.8% Pasifika; 4.1% Asian; 1.0% Middle Eastern, Latin American and African New Zealanders (MELAA); and 1.5% other, which includes people giving their ethnicity as "New Zealander". English was spoken by 97.4%, Māori by 3.6%, Samoan by 0.3%, and other languages by 7.5%. No language could be spoken by 1.8% (e.g. too young to talk). New Zealand Sign Language was known by 0.5%. The percentage of people born overseas was 17.7, compared with 28.8% nationally.

Religious affiliations were 35.7% Christian, 1.0% Hindu, 1.5% Māori religious beliefs, 0.8% Buddhist, 0.5% New Age, and 1.0% other religions. People who answered that they had no religion were 53.2%, and 6.9% of people did not answer the census question.

Of those at least 15 years old, 231 (22.8%) people had a bachelor's or higher degree, 573 (56.7%) had a post-high school certificate or diploma, and 204 (20.2%) people exclusively held high school qualifications. The median income was $43,300, compared with $41,500 nationally. 144 people (14.2%) earned over $100,000 compared to 12.1% nationally. The employment status of those at least 15 was 474 (46.9%) full-time, 135 (13.4%) part-time, and 24 (2.4%) unemployed.

== Education ==
Westshore School is a primary school located in Westshore and caters from New Entrants to Year 6, with a roll of 84 as of July 2025. The school opened in 1897.

== See also ==
Westshore railway station
