= Hawke's Bay Airport =

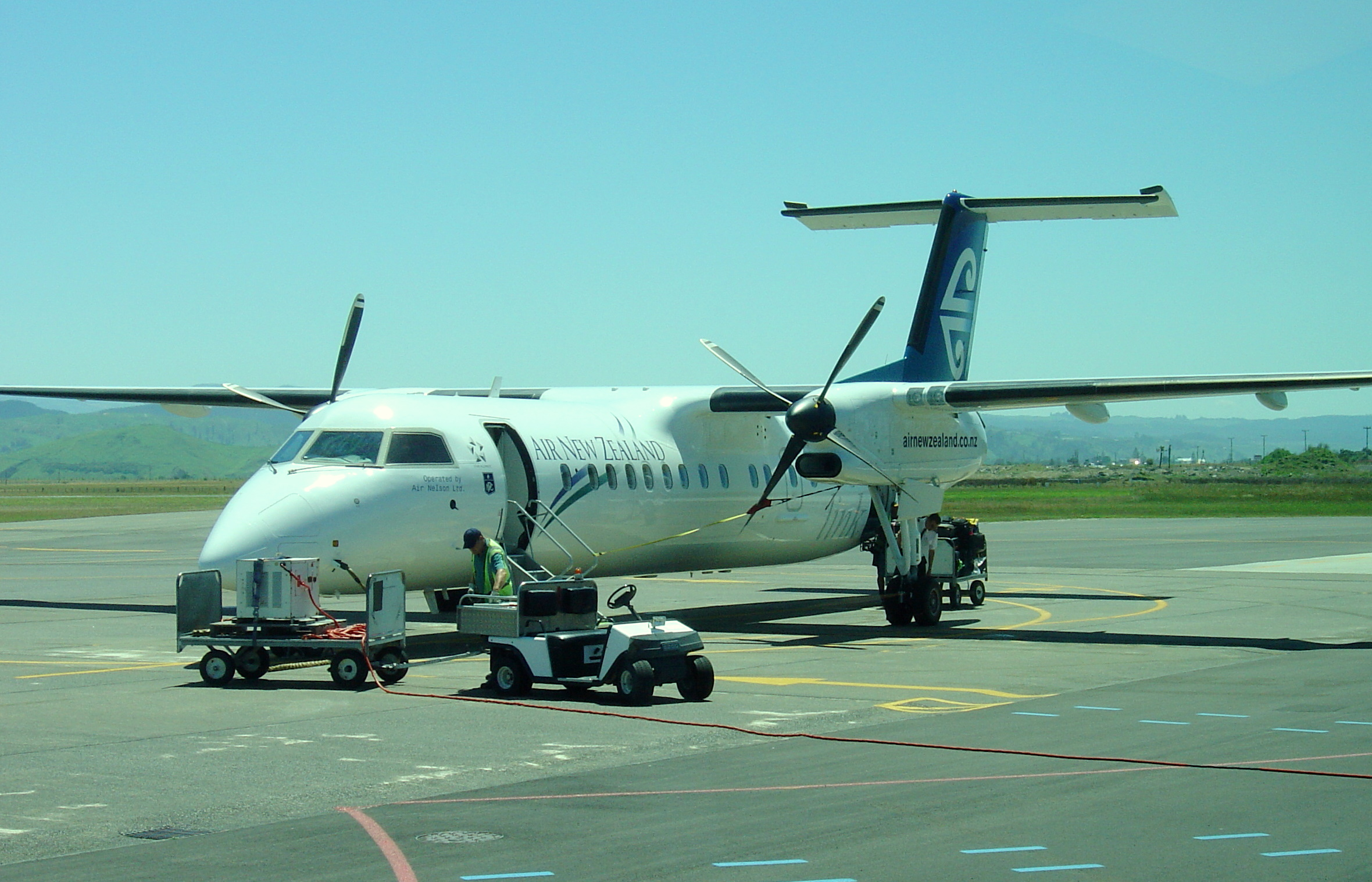
- Air New Zealand Bombardier Q300 at Hawke's Bay Airport, 2005
- IATA: NPE; ICAO: NZNR

Summary
- Airport type: Public
- Owner: Crown (50%); Napier City (26%); Hastings District (24%)
- Operator: Hawke's Bay Airport Ltd
- Serves: Hastings and Napier
- Location: State Highway 2, Westshore, Napier, New Zealand
- Elevation AMSL: 2 m (6.6 ft)
- Coordinates: 39°28′06″S 176°52′18″E
- Website: hawkesbay-airport.co.nz

Map
- Location of airport in North Island

Runways
Direction	Length		Surface
Direction	m	ft	Surface
16/34	1,750	5,742	Asphalt
07/25	1,199	3,934	Asphalt/grass
10/28	560	1,837	Grass

Statistics (July 2024 to June 2025)
- Passengers (total): 612,388

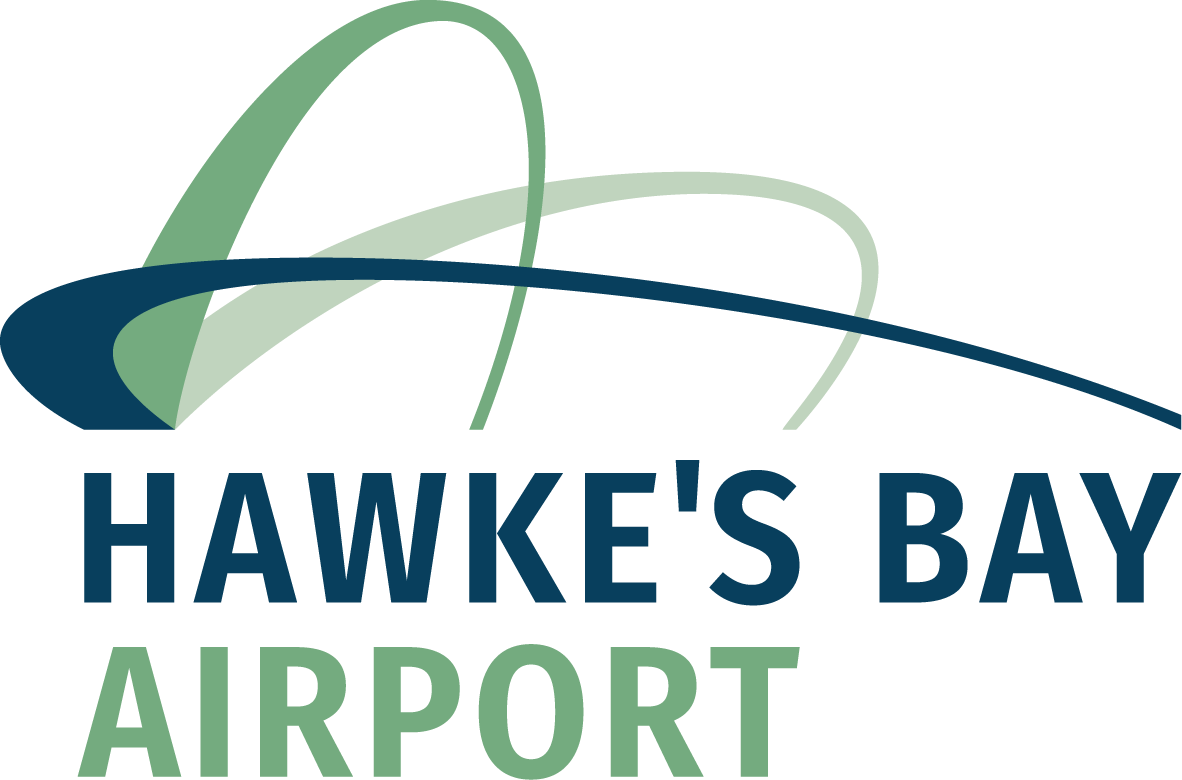
Hawke's Bay Airport logo

Hawke's Bay Airport (IATA: NPE, ICAO: NZNR), commonly referred to as Napier Airport, is Hawke's Bay's main commercial airport, serving domestic flights to the main centres of Auckland, Wellington and Christchurch, and smaller centres in the North Island. The airport is located in the north of Napier and 20.7 km from Hastings. As of 2025, it is the seventh busiest airport in New Zealand.

== General ==
Hawke's Bay Airport is in Westshore, a suburb of Napier, and is sometimes referred to as Napier Airport. It is sited on the former Ahuriri Lagoon, an area that was raised above sea level by the 1931 Hawke's Bay earthquake. The airport is permitted to allow limited international flights with customs clearance for aircraft with up to fourteen people on board by prior arrangement with Air Napier or Skyline Aviation. Hastings Aerodrome is another, smaller airport, 22 km to the south near Hastings, used primarily for flight training and recreational aviation, which Hawke's Bay Airport does not offer.

== History ==
The previous airport in Napier was the Embankment Aerodrome, which was started in 1932 and located near the Napier end of the Napier–Westshore road and rail embankment. The Napier Airport Board was formed in 1935 and the borough of Napier became owner of the aerodrome. While work was being done to bring it up to Civil Aviation Authority (CAA) standards, an alternative airfield was needed, so one was created near the shipping beacons between Westshore and Bay View. It was then realised that the Beacons Aerodrome had more space for further development, so the airport board made it Napier's main airport. It was chosen as Hawke's Bay's main airport in 1944. The CAA confirmed it as the airport for Hawke's Bay in 1957, but Hastings leaders objected, preferring to have an airport closer to their city. The Government set up an Airport Inquiry Committee in 1961 to settle the matter. They again confirmed the Beacons as the best option, and recommended the building of a Napier–Hastings motorway to provide quick access from Hastings. A new 4,300-foot (1,300 m) runway was built and Hawke's Bay Airport officially opened in February 1964.

In 2010–2011 the main runway was extended to 1750 metres with 240-metre runway end safety areas at either end, which is long enough to accommodate jet services operated by Air New Zealand on domestic operations (Airbus A320 aircraft). A terminal reconfiguration, along with a full-scale security fence, would be required before scheduled domestic jet services could commence. At this stage further development to enable trans-Tasman services is not planned. Hawke's Bay Airport has received resource consent from the Napier City Council to begin Stage 1 of a significant multimillion-dollar business park development.

In November 2013, Hawke's Bay Airport announced advanced planning to further lengthen its main runway from 1750 m to 1940 m no later than 2018, and a significant terminal expansion and redevelopment to cope with significantly higher than projected annual increases in passengers numbers. A new NZ$25 million terminal building opened on 5 August 2021 after numerous delays due to the COVID-19 pandemic.

Jetstar Airways operated daily services between Napier and Auckland from December 2015 to November 2019.

As of 2023, it is the seventh busiest airport in New Zealand. In the 2018/2019 financial year, 750,357 passengers passed through the airport. In the 2021/2022 year, during the COVID-19 pandemic, it was 394,000 passengers. It was 654,831 in 2023/2024 and 612,388 in 2024/2025.

== Airlines and destinations ==
Airlines	Destinations
Air Napier	Gisborne
Air New Zealand	Auckland, Christchurch, Wellington
Sunair	Gisborne, Hamilton, Tauranga, Wairoa, Whakatāne

== See also ==
- List of airports in New Zealand
- List of airlines of New Zealand
