= Ahuriri =

Suburb of Napier, New Zealand

- Suburb
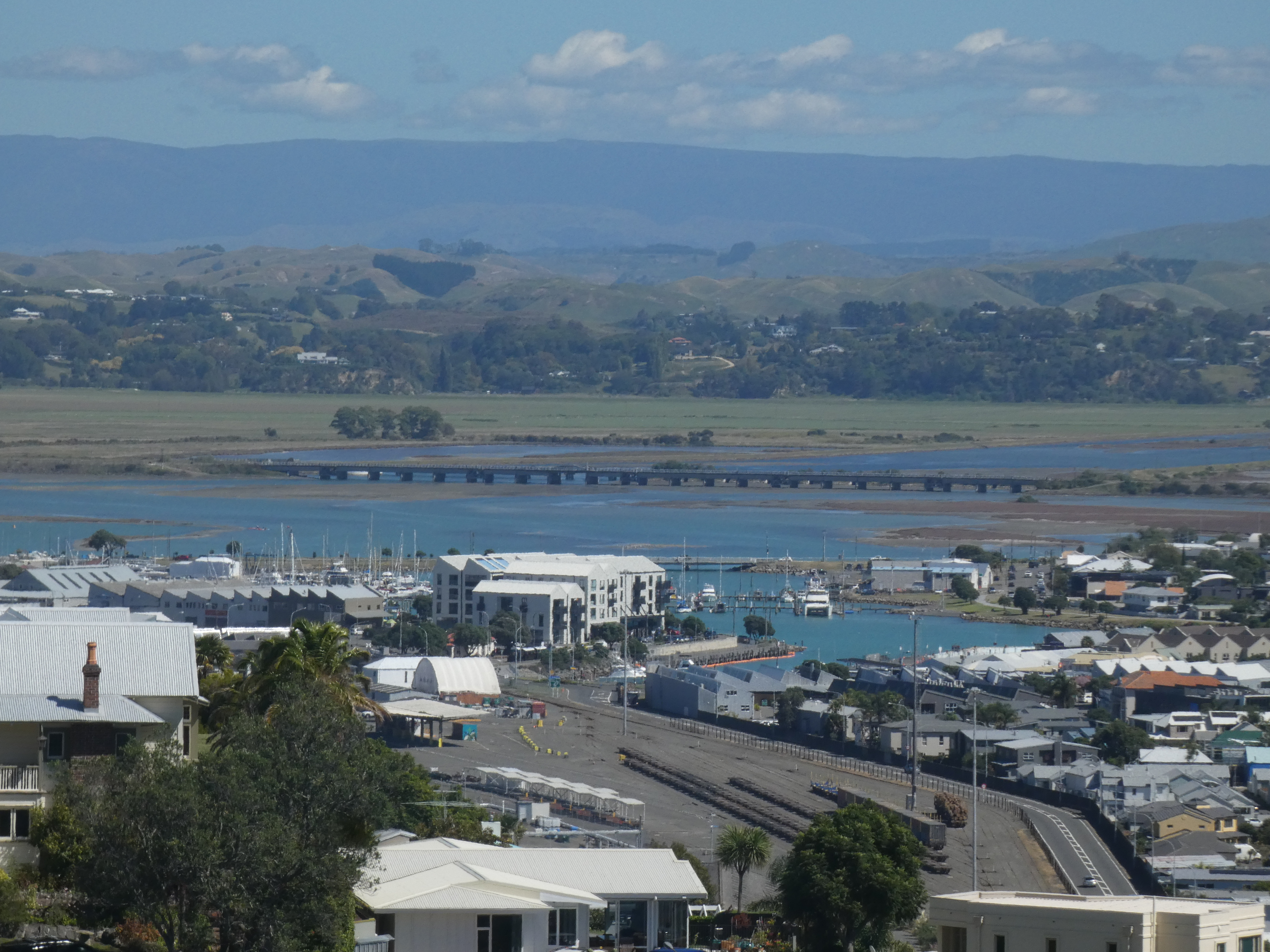
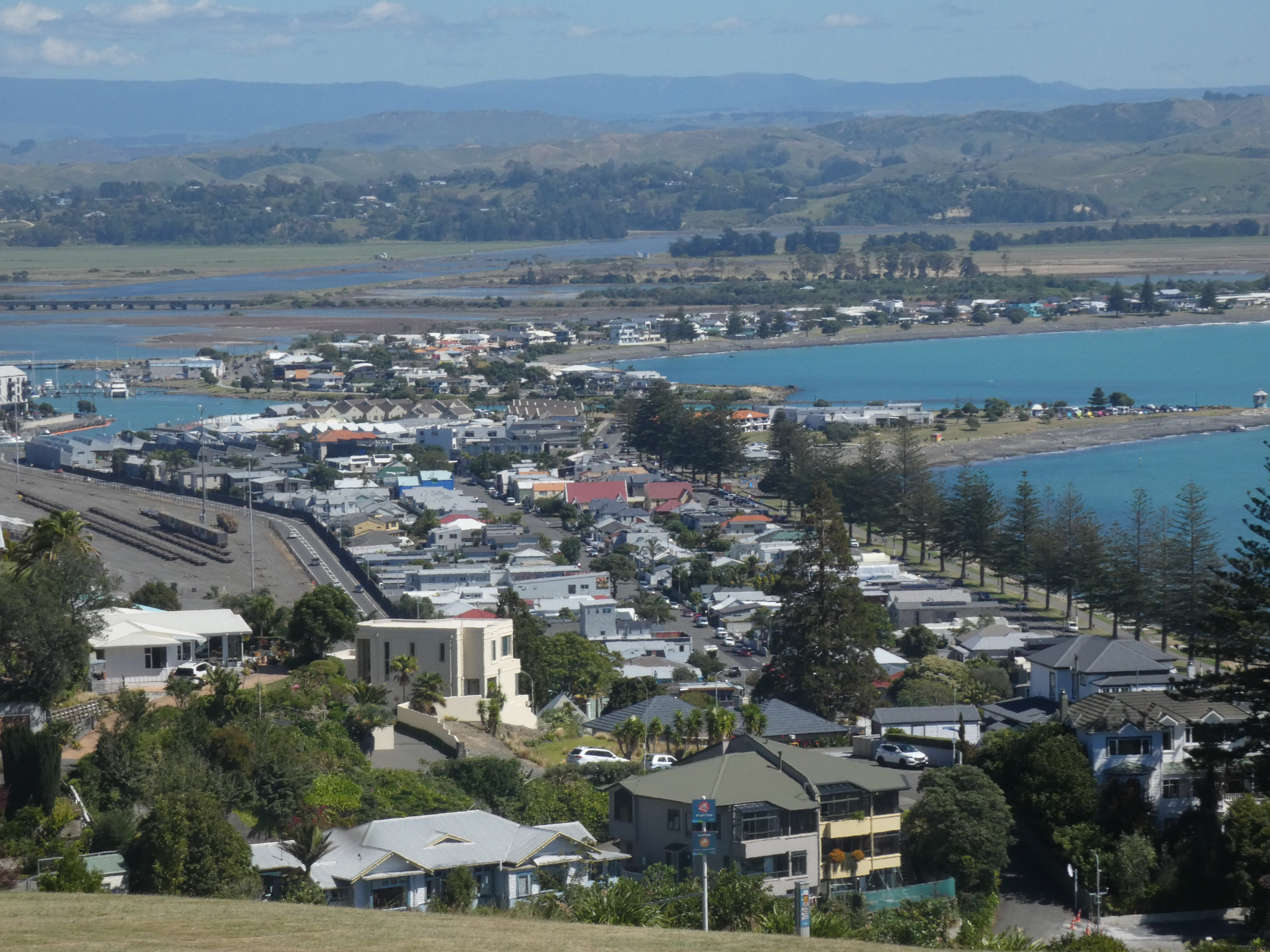
- Ahuriri viewed from Bluff Hill
- Interactive map of Ahuriri
- Coordinates: 39.481459°S 176.897960°E
- Country: New Zealand
- City: Napier
- Local authority: Napier City Council
- Electoral ward: Ahuriri Ward

Area
  - Land: 98 ha (240 acres)

Population (June 2025)
  - Total: 1,160
  - Density: 1,200/km^{2} (3,100/sq mi)

| Westshore | | (Hawke Bay) |
| | Ahuriri |
| Onekawa | Hospital Hill | Bluff Hill |

Ahuriri is a suburb of the city of Napier, in the Hawke's Bay region of New Zealand's eastern North Island.

The area was a major site of Māori and European settlement, and the site of the Port of Napier until the 1931 Hawke's Bay earthquake. It has since been redeveloped as a mixed commercial and residential area.

== Demographics ==
Ahuriri covers 0.98 km^{2} (0.38 sq mi) and had an estimated population of 1,160 as of June 2025, with a population density of 1,184 people per km^{2}.

Historical population
| Year | Pop. | ±% p.a. |
|---|---|---|
| 2006 | 858 | — |
| 2013 | 1,089 | +3.46% |
| 2018 | 1,161 | +1.29% |
| 2023 | 1,155 | −0.10% |

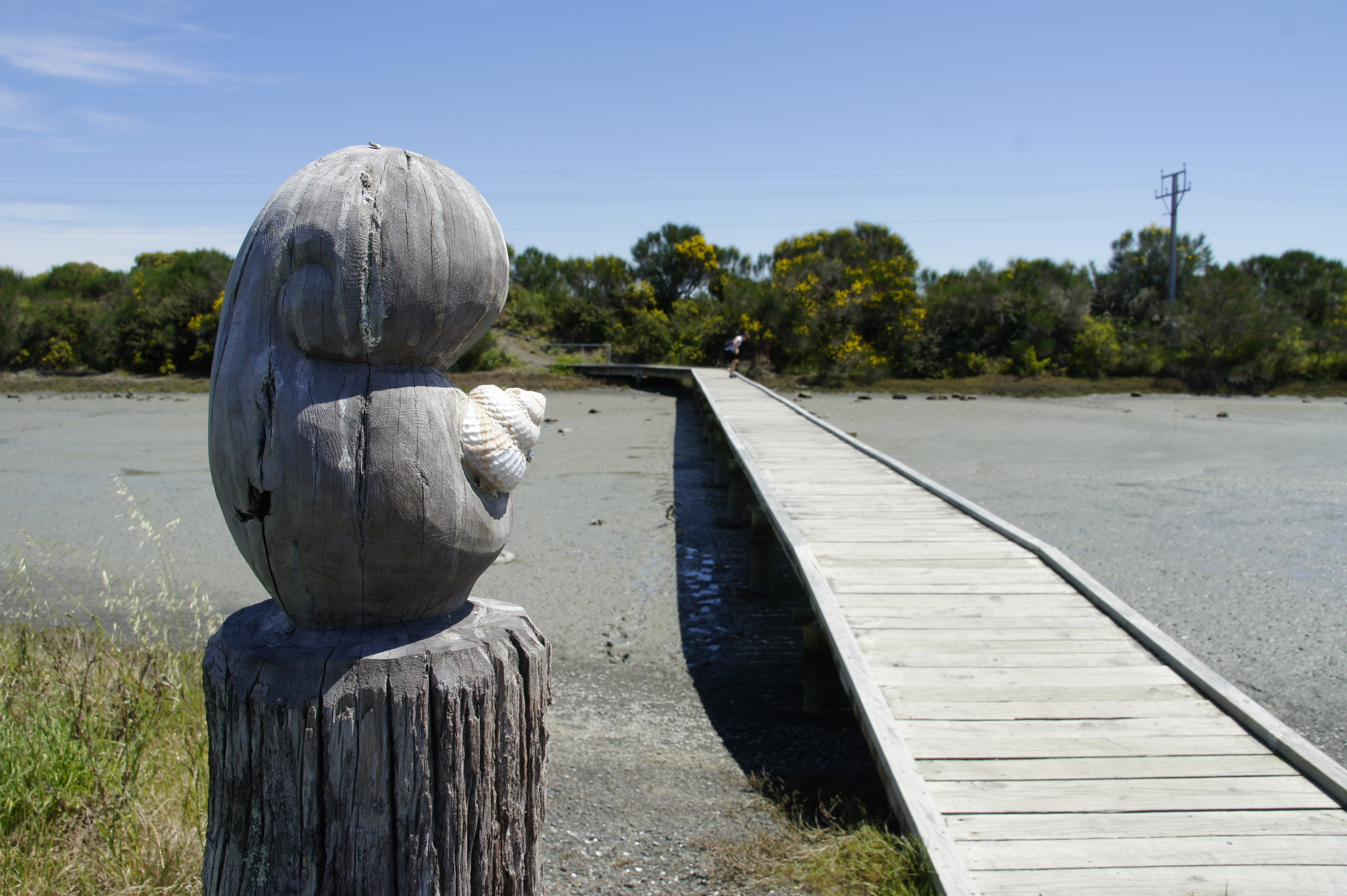
Ahuriri Estuary Walkway

Ahuriri had a population of 1,155 in the 2023 New Zealand census, a decrease of 6 people (−0.5%) since the 2018 census, and an increase of 66 people (6.1%) since the 2013 census. There were 528 males, 624 females, and 3 people of other genders in 531 dwellings. 2.1% of people identified as LGBTIQ+. The median age was 62.8 years (compared with 38.1 years nationally). There were 108 people (9.4%) aged under 15 years, 141 (12.2%) aged 15 to 29, 372 (32.2%) aged 30 to 64, and 534 (46.2%) aged 65 or older.

People could identify as more than one ethnicity. The results were 85.5% European (Pākehā); 15.6% Māori; 2.6% Pasifika; 4.7% Asian; 1.0% Middle Eastern, Latin American and African New Zealanders (MELAA); and 4.7% other, which includes people giving their ethnicity as "New Zealander". English was spoken by 98.2%, Māori by 3.4%, Samoan by 0.5%, and other languages by 7.0%. No language could be spoken by 1.6% (e.g. too young to talk). New Zealand Sign Language was known by 0.3%. The percentage of people born overseas was 18.7, compared with 28.8% nationally.

Religious affiliations were 42.6% Christian, 0.8% Hindu, 0.3% Islam, 2.1% Māori religious beliefs, 0.5% Buddhist, 0.3% New Age, and 0.8% other religions. People who answered that they had no religion were 47.0%, and 6.2% of people did not answer the census question.

Of those at least 15 years old, 207 (19.8%) people had a bachelor's or higher degree, 546 (52.1%) had a post-high school certificate or diploma, and 294 (28.1%) people exclusively held high school qualifications. The median income was $36,300, compared with $41,500 nationally. 120 people (11.5%) earned over $100,000 compared to 12.1% nationally. The employment status of those at least 15 was 360 (34.4%) full-time, 114 (10.9%) part-time, and 27 (2.6%) unemployed.

== Education ==
Port Ahuriri School is co-educational Year 1–6 state primary school, with a roll of 245 as of March 2026. The school started in 1868.
