= Te Atua Mahuru =

Hill in Hawke's Bay, New Zealand

Mount Maropea
- Maropea

Highest point
- Elevation: 1,534 m (5,033 ft)
- Coordinates: 39.711°S 176.18°E

Geography
- Location: North Island, New Zealand
- Parent range: Ruahine Range, Colenso Spur

Te Atua Mahuru is a prominent peak in southern Hawke's Bay and the eastern Rangitikei District, in New Zealand's eastern North Island. It lies in the Ruahine Range, within the boundaries of the Ruahine Forest Park, of which it is the second highest peak, at 1534 metres. The Makaroro River has its source on the eastern flanks of Te Atua Mahuru. The slightly smaller Mount Maropea lies just to the south.
