= Mangatewai River =

River in the Hawke's Bay Region, New Zealand

- Route of the Mangatewai River
- Mouth of the Mangatewai River Mangatewai River (North Island)
- Native name: Mangatewai (Māori)

Location
- Country: New Zealand
- Island: North Island
- Region: Hawke's Bay
- District: Central Hawke's Bay

Physical characteristics
- Source: Mangatewai Stream North Branch
  - coordinates: 39.9511°S 176.16418°E
- 2nd source: Mangatewai Stream South Branch
  - coordinates: 39.96801°S 176.14745°E
- Mouth: Tukipō River
  - coordinates: 39°58′56″S 176°20′56″E
- Length: 22 km (14 mi)

Basin features
- Progression: Mangatewai River → Tukipō River → Tukituki River → Tukituki Estuary → Hawke Bay → Pacific Ocean
- Tributaries
  - left: Rākautihiau Stream
- Bridges: Mangatewai River Bridge (857)

The Mangatewai River is a river of the Hawke's Bay Region of New Zealand's North Island. It flows generally east from the Ruahine Range to reach the Tukipō River (itself a tributary of the Tukituki River) 5 kilometres (3 mi) north of the township of Takapau. The Mangatewai River should not be confused with its southern neighbour, the Mangatewainui River.

== Geography ==
The river begins in two different branches, the Mangatewai Stream North Branch and the Mangatewai Stream South Branch.

== See also ==
- List of rivers of New Zealand
