= Mangaonuku Stream (Hawke's Bay) =

Stream in the Hawke's Bay Region, New Zealand

- Route of the Mangaonuku Stream
- Mouth of the Mangaonuku Stream Mangaonuku Stream (Hawke's Bay) (North Island)
- Native name: Mangaonuku (Māori)

Location
- Country: New Zealand
- Island: North Island
- Region: Hawke's Bay
- District: Central Hawke's Bay, Hastings

Physical characteristics
- Source
  - location: Ruahine Range
  - coordinates: 39.69685°S 176.40936°E
- Mouth: Waipawa River
  - coordinates: 39°55′21″S 176°31′48″E
- Length: 36 km (22 mi)

Basin features
- Progression: Mangaonuku Stream → Waipawa River → Tukituki River → Tukituki Estuary → Hawke Bay → Pacific Ocean
- Tributaries
  - left: Te Heka Stream, Mangatahi Stream
  - right: Mangamate Stream, Mangamauku Stream, Mangaoho Stream
- Bridges: Manga-o-Nuku Stream No. 1 Bridge, Manga-o-Nuku Stream No. 2 Bridge, Manga-o-Nuku Stream No. 3 Bridge, Wharetoka Road Bridge, The Brow Road Bridge, Tikokino Road Bridge

The Mangaonuku Stream is a river in the Hawke's Bay region of the eastern North Island of New Zealand. It is a tributary of the Waipawa River.
