= Mākāretu River =

River in the Hawke's Bay Region, New Zealand

- Route of the Mākāretu River
- Mouth of the Mākāretu River Mākāretu River (North Island)
- Native name: Mākāretu (Māori)

Location
- Country: New Zealand
- Island: North Island
- Region: Hawke's Bay, Manawatū-Whanganui
- District: Central Hawke's Bay, Tararua

Physical characteristics
- Source: Mākāretu River main branch
  - location: Ruahine Range
  - coordinates: 40.02055°S 176.10127°E
- 2nd source: Mākāretu River North Branch
  - location: Ruahine Range
  - coordinates: 39.94989°S 176.12367°E
- Mouth: Tukipō River
  - coordinates: 39°58′36″S 176°28′57″E
- Length: 38 km (24 mi)

Basin features
- Progression: Mākāretu River → Tukipō River → Tukituki River → Tukituki Estuary → Hawke Bay → Pacific Ocean
- Tributaries
  - left: Mākāretu River North Branch
  - right: Māharakeke Stream
- Bridges: Padget Road Bridge, Thompsons Bridge (888, State Highway 50), Burnside Road bridge, Speedy Road Bridge

The Mākāretu River is a river of the southern Hawke's Bay region and the Tararua District of New Zealand's North Island. One of numerous roughly parallel rivers, it flows east from the slopes of the Ruahine Range north of Dannevirke, passing close to the township of Takapau before meeting the waters of the Tukipō River just to the west of Waipukurau.

== Geography ==
The river rises from the Ruahine Range, and originates from two branches: the main branch and the Mākāretu River North Branch. While primarily flowing through the Central Hawke's Bay District, a small section of the main branch originates in the Tararua District of the Manawatū-Whanganui Region.

== History ==
The river's name refers to Anthoxanthum redolens or kāretu, a scented grass known to have grown on its banks.

The Mākāretu River has cultural significance to Ngāti Kahungunu. The hapū Ngāi Te Rangitotohu and Ngāti Mārau traditionally lived in the upper section of the river, Ngāi Tahu ki Takapau, Ngāi Te Kikiri o Te Rangi and Ngāi Toroiwaho in the central section, and Ngāi Tahu ki Takapau and Ngāi Toroiwaho in the lower sections. A number of overland tracks crossed the river, including Te Tāwai and Te Takanga-o-Tauterangi.

The river and its margins are a traditional source for fish, birds and flax harvesting, as well as berries from hīnau trees which were formerly common along the riverbanks.

A bridge over the river at Burnside Road was badly damaged during Cyclone Gabrielle in February 2023 and has been closed since. The Central Hawke's Bay District Council has decided it is too expensive to replace it, with an estimated cost of NZ$16 million for a two lane bridge, or $9 million for a single lane. A bridge construction company, Bridge It NZ, says it could build a one lane bride for $2.75 million.

== See also ==
- List of rivers of New Zealand
