= Mount Maropea =

Mountain in New Zealand

- Maropea

Highest point
- Elevation: 1,481 m (4,859 ft)
- Coordinates: 39.745°S 176.176°E

Geography
- Location: North Island, New Zealand
- Parent range: Ruahine Range

Mount Maropea is a prominent peak in the Ruahine Range, located in southern Hawke's Bay and the eastern Rangitikei District, in New Zealand's eastern North Island. It rises to an elevation of 1,481 metres (4,859 ft) within the boundaries of the Ruahine Forest Park.

The peak lies just south of Te Atua Mahuru, a slightly higher peak in the range. The surrounding backcountry features several huts managed by the Department of Conservation, including Top Maropea Hut, which serves tramping routes across the central Ruahine tops.
