= Tukituki =

Tukituki may refer to the following in New Zealand:

- Tukituki River
- Tukituki (New Zealand electorate), a current general electorate
