= Old Bed of Waipawa River =

River in the Hawke's Bay Region, New Zealand

- Route of the Old Bed of Waipawa River
- Mouth of the Old Bed of Waipawa River Old Bed of Waipawa River (North Island)
- Native name: Waipawa (Māori)

Location
- Country: New Zealand
- Island: North Island
- Region: Hawke's Bay
- District: Central Hawke's Bay

Physical characteristics
- Source: Coronation Park stop bank
  - location: Waipawa
  - coordinates: 39.96607°S 176.63801°E
- Mouth: Papanui Stream
  - coordinates: 39°54′07″S 176°39′41″E

Basin features
- Progression: Old Bed of Waipawa River → Papanui Stream → Tukituki River → Tukituki Estuary → Hawke Bay → Pacific Ocean
- Bridges: Tod Road Bridge, Old Riverbed Bridge (Elsthorpe Road)

The Old Bed of Waipawa River is a river of the Hawke's Bay region of New Zealand's North Island. It flows roughly parallel with and north of the Waipawa River, which it almost meets to the east of Waipawa. It flows into the Tukituki River via the Papanui Stream, south west of Lake Poukawa. The Waipawa changed its course during a flood in 1868. In the Cyclone Gabrielle event of February 2023 the flooded river broke its banks south of Waipapa town and reverted to its old bed, causing significant damage to farms and property. The Coronation Park stop bank in Waipawa was repaired on 16 February 2023, returning the Waipawa to its post 1868 course.

== See also ==
- List of rivers of New Zealand
