= Tukipō River =

River in the Hawke's Bay Region, New Zealand

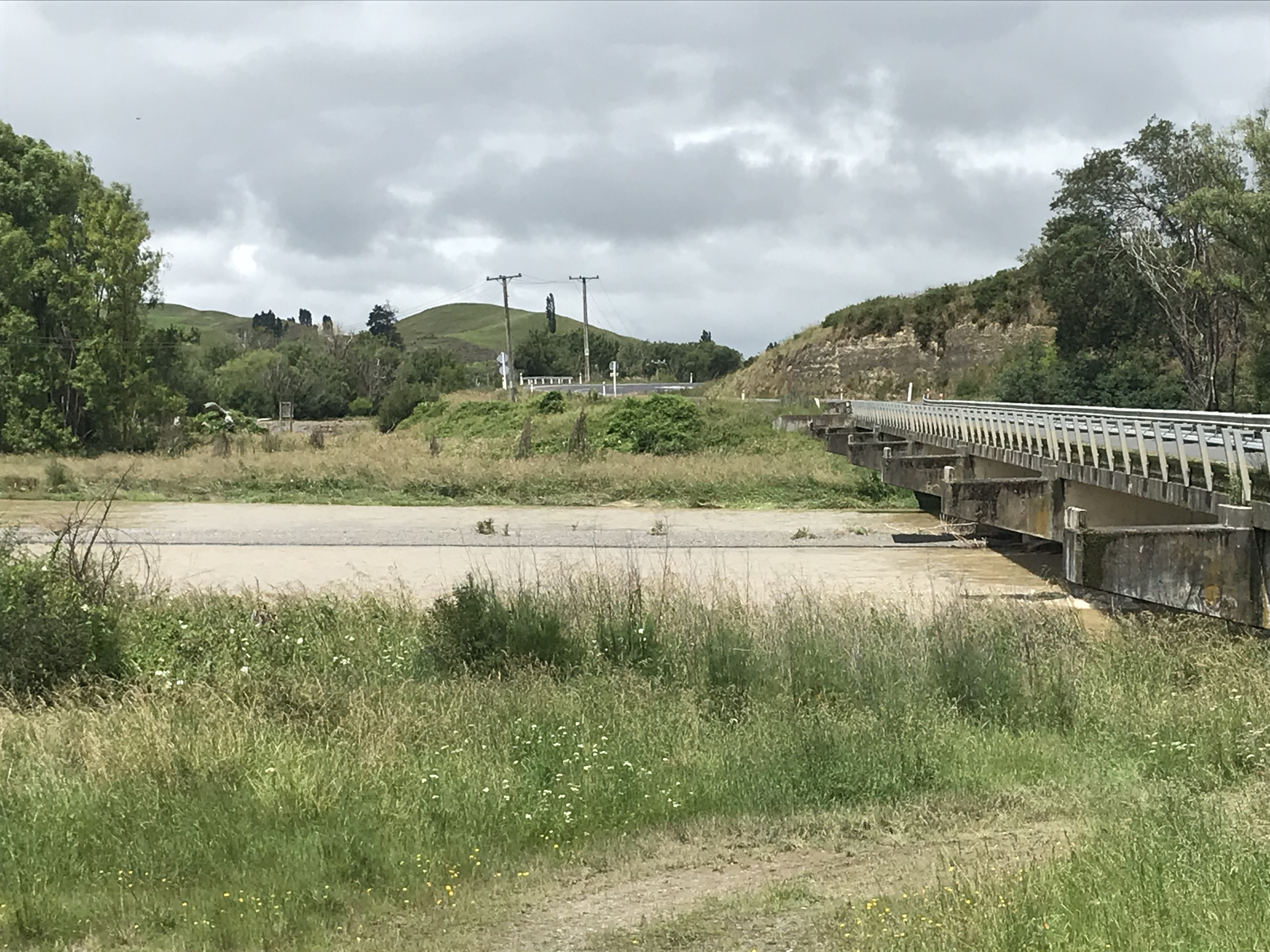
- The Tukipō River in Hawkes Bay, New Zealand, seen from Ashcott Road
- Route of Tukipō River
- Mouth of Tukipō River Tukipō River (North Island)

Location
- Country: New Zealand
- Island: North Island
- Region: Hawke's Bay
- District: Central Hawke's Bay

Physical characteristics
- Source
  - coordinates: 39.90743°S 176.20281°E
- Mouth: Tukituki River
  - coordinates: 39°58′31″S 176°29′55″E

Basin features
- Progression: Tukipō River → Tukituki River → Tukituki Estuary → Hawke Bay → Pacific Ocean
- Tributaries
  - left: Avoca River
  - right: Parikaka Stream, Tāngarēwai Stream, Mangatewai River, Mangapohio Stream, Mākāretu River
- Bridges: Tukipō Stream Bridge (831)

The Tukipo River is a river of the southwest Hawke's Bay region of New Zealand's North Island. It flows east from its origins in the Ruahine Range to reach the Tukituki River 5 km (3.1 mi) west of Waipukurau.

== History ==
The river has cultural significance to Ngāti Kahungunu. The ancestor Hikarerepari first settled in the area, and his great-grandson Te Whatuiapiti constructed the pā Pōhatunui-a-Toru in the upper reaches of the river.

== See also ==
- List of rivers of New Zealand
