= Waipawa River =

River in the Hawke's Bay Region, New Zealand

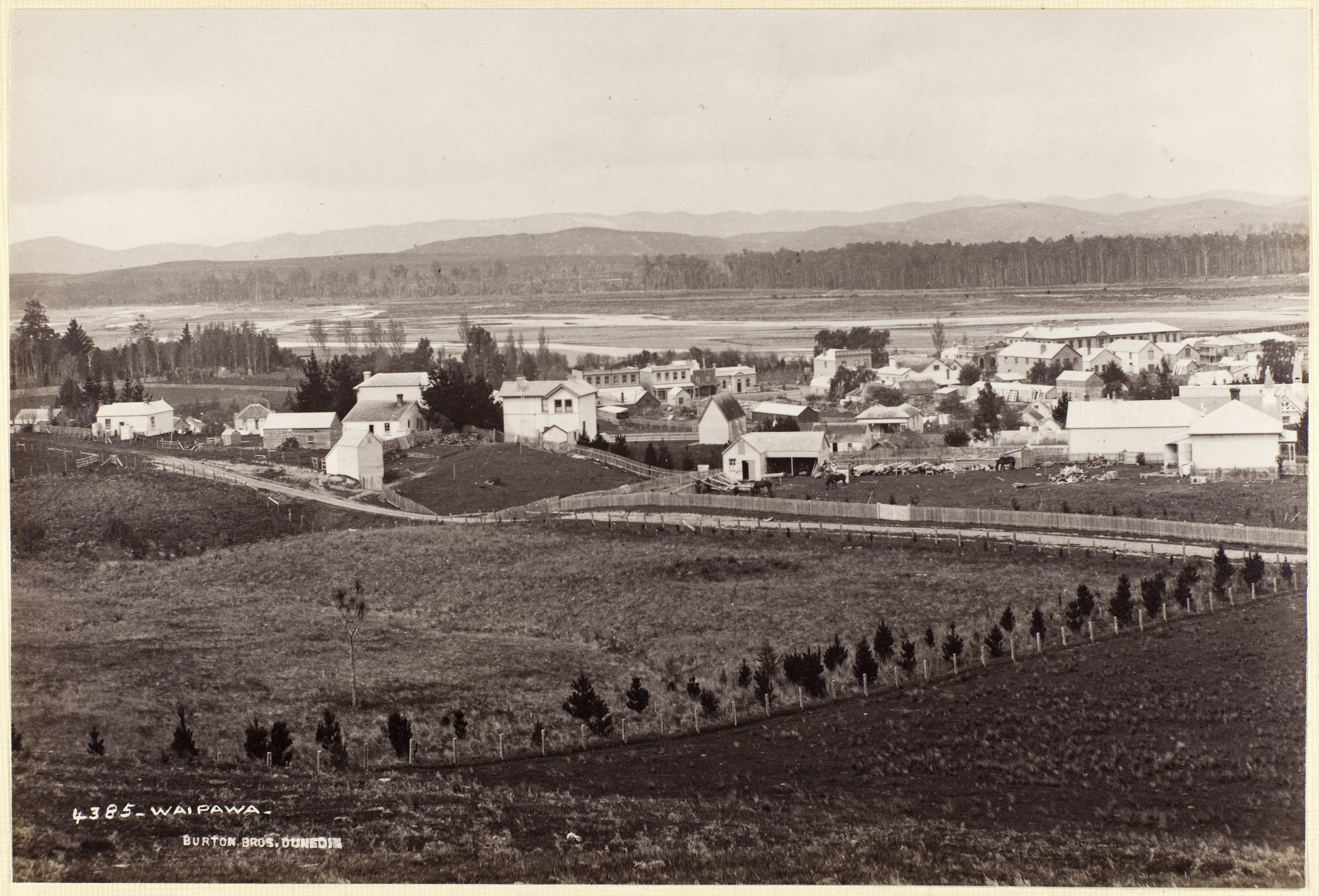
- Waipawa town and river in 1885
- Route of the Waipawa River
- Mouth of the Waipawa River Waipawa River (North Island)
- Native name: Waipawa (Māori)

Location
- Country: New Zealand
- Island: North Island
- Region: Hawke's Bay
- District: Central Hawke's Bay

Physical characteristics
- Source: Ruahine Range
  - location: Between Waipawa Saddle and Three Johns Peak
  - coordinates: 39.81078°S 176.15182°E
  - elevation: 1,687 m (5,535 ft)
- Mouth: Tukituki River
  - coordinates: 39°58′26″S 176°38′06″E
  - elevation: 120 m (390 ft)
- Length: 57 km (35 mi)

Basin features
- Progression: Waipawa River → Tukituki River → Tukituki Estuary → Hawke Bay → Pacific Ocean
- Cities: Waipawa
- Tributaries
  - left: Mangataura Stream, Mākaroro River, Mangaonuku Stream
  - right: Middle Stream, Smith Stream
- Bridges: Pendle Hill Road Bridge, Wakarara Road Bridge, Waipawa River Bridge (670, State Highway 50), Waipawa River Bridge (7138, State Highway 2), Waipawa Railway Bridge

The Waipawa River is a braided river of southern Hawke's Bay, in New Zealand's eastern North Island. It flows southeast from the slopes of 1,687 m (5,535 ft) Te Atuaoparapara (once known as 'Sixty-six') in the Ruahine Range, past the town of Waipawa, before joining the Tukituki River.

== Geography ==
The river rises at the 1,326 m (4,350 ft) Waipawa Saddle, which is also the source of the Waikamaka River. The Mangaonuku Stream is a tributary on the northern bank, west of Waipawa, near Ruataniwha. It flows across the Ruataniwha Plains into the Tukituki River. The Waipawa's flow is generally greater than that of the Tukituki River.

The Old Bed of Waipawa River flows roughly parallel with and north of the present Waipawa River to join the Tukituki through the Papanui Stream, south west of Lake Poukawa. The Waipawa changed its course during a flood in 1868. It reverted to its old course during Cyclone Gabrielle in February 2023, until the Coronation Park stop bank in Waipawa was repaired on 16 February, returning the Waipawa to its post-1868 course.

River quality is sampled at the SH50 bridge. At that site its Macroinvertebrate Community Index is C (of grades A to D) and likely degrading, but it is in the best 25% of rivers for most samples, except clarity. In warm weather cyanobacteria sometimes develop. Other main routes crossing the river are SH2 and the Palmerston North–Gisborne railway at Waipawa.

== Biodiversity ==
There are hundreds of banded dotterel (pohowera) and pied stilt around the river.

== History ==
The river has cultural significance to Ngāti Kahungunu, including Heretaunga Tamatea. The river is associated with the ancestor Te Whatuiapiti, and was a traditional access point for the resources of the Ruahine Range. It is the location of many archaeological sites and traditional pā and kāinga, including Te Pari-o Koro pā, Tukipoho pā and Motu-o-Puku pā.

== Recreation ==
Waipawa Forks Hut provides accommodation close to the headwaters of the river. On the ridge to the north, above the headwaters, is Sunrise Hut. It is the most popular hut in the Ruahine Park and was renovated in 2020. A day walk is possible, via Sunrise and the Saddle.
