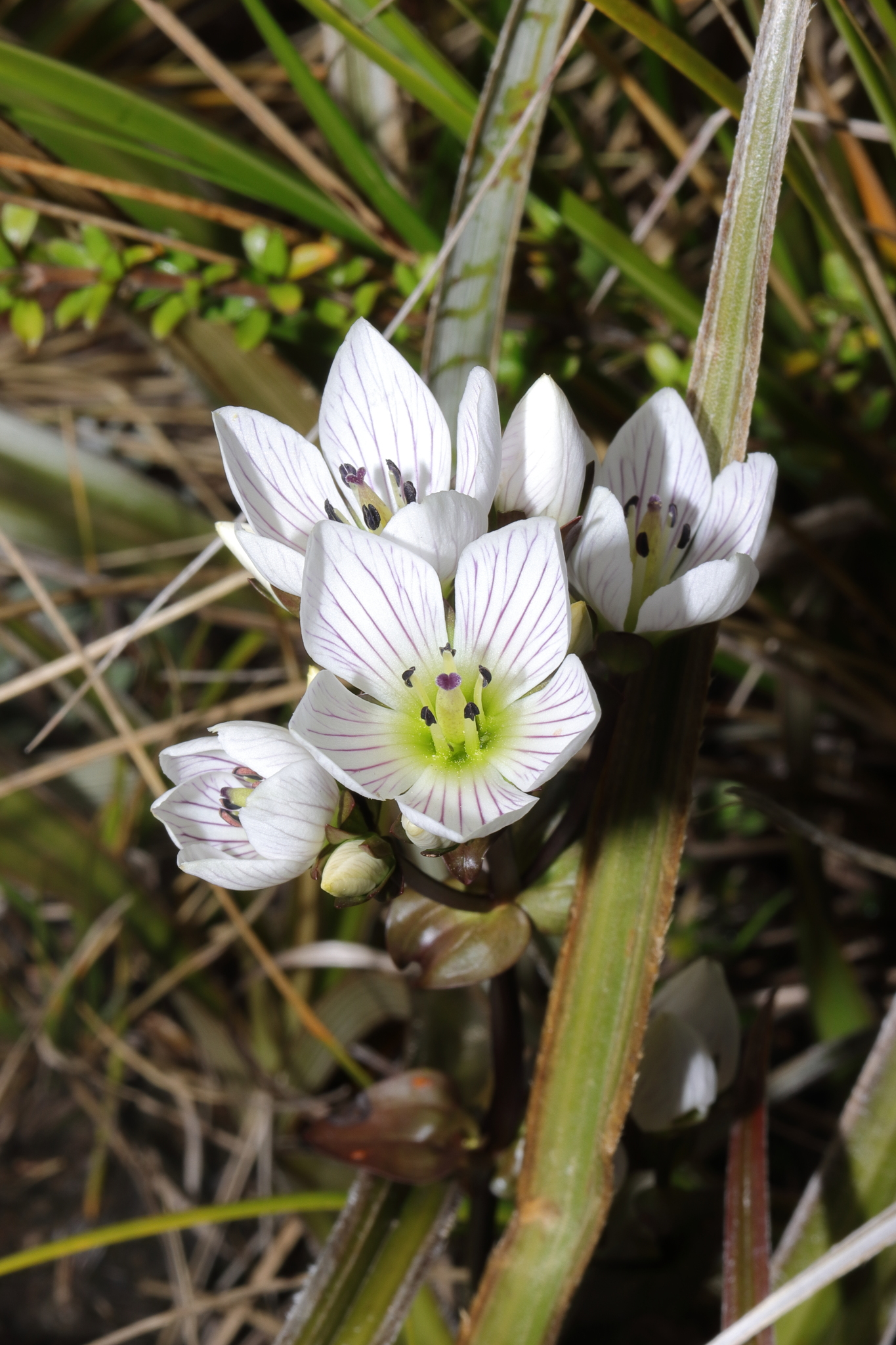
- Gentianella montana in Ruahine Forest Park

Conservation status
- Not Threatened (NZ TCS)

Scientific classification
- Kingdom: Plantae
- Clade: Tracheophytes
- Clade: Angiosperms
- Clade: Eudicots
- Clade: Asterids
- Order: Gentianales
- Family: Gentianaceae
- Genus: Gentianella
- Species: G. montana

Binomial name
- Gentianella montana (G.Forst.) Holub

= Gentianella montana =

Species of flowering plant

Gentianella montana is a species of flowering plant, endemic to New Zealand. It is found on both the North and South Island.

== Description ==
A small flower with white petals. Perennial.

== Etymology ==
Montana comes from Latin and refers to the habitat of the flower, in mountainous areas.

== Taxonomy ==
Gentianella montana contains the following subspecies:

- Gentianella montana stolonifera
- Gentianella montana ionostigma
- Gentianella montana montana
