= Mākaroro River =

River in the Hawke's Bay Region, New Zealand

- Route of the Mākaroro River
- Mouth of the Mākaroro River Mākaroro River (North Island)
- Native name: Mākaroro (Māori)

Location
- Country: New Zealand
- Island: North Island
- Region: Hawke's Bay
- District: Central Hawke's Bay, Hastings

Physical characteristics
- Source
  - location: Ruahine Range
  - coordinates: 39.63861°S 176.26379°E
- Mouth: Waipawa River
  - coordinates: 39°49′26″S 176°18′49″E
- Length: 23 km (14 mi)

Basin features
- Progression: Mākaroro River → Waipawa River → Tukituki River → Tukituki Estuary → Hawke Bay → Pacific Ocean
- Tributaries
  - left: Dutch Creek
  - right: Gold Creek
- Bridges: Makaroro Road Bridge

The Mākaroro River is a river of the southern Hawke's Bay region of New Zealand's North Island. It flows southeast from the slopes of the Ruahine Range, meeting the waters of the Waipawa River 12 kilometres (7 mi) west of Tikokino.

== Ruataniwha Water Storage Scheme ==
The upper river is the proposed site for the Ruataniwha Water Storage Scheme, also called the Tukituki Catchment Proposal, a dam to create a 93 million m^{3} storage reservoir. The project was proposed by the Hawke's Bay Regional Council to ensure water sustainability for the region around the dam site. The Council created the Hawke's Bay Regional Investment Company Ltd in 2013 to manage the project. Due to the nature of the Regional Council's relationship, the resource consent was handled by the Environmental Protection Authority, and the Department of Conservation due to some of the land on the proposed site being part of the Ruahine Forest Park.

After the initial approval in 2014, two appeals lodged by Hawke's Bay and Eastern Fish and Game Councils and the Royal Forest and Bird Protection Society of New Zealand and cross appeal lodged by the Environmental Defence Society were examined by the High Court to reconsider the conditions of consent. On 12 December 2014 Justice Collins ordered the Board to reconsider their decision on an appropriate mechanism for managing the amount of nitrogen that enters the catchment area and giving parties a fair opportunity to comment. The final decision was released 25 June 2015 which included some amendments to the previous consent conditions. Forest and Bird appealed the decision to allow for the transfer of 170ha of farmland for 22ha of protected conservation land in Ruahine Forest Park which would be flooded for the dam to the Appeal Court. The Court ruled on 31 August 2016 that the Director-General of Conservation was not entitled to revoke the special conservation status of a small portion in exchange for the parkland. This decision was further appealed by the Hawke's Bay Regional Investment Company Ltd and the Minister of Conservation to the Supreme Court on 27 and 28 February 2017. The court ruled on 6 July 2017 dismissing the appeal and upholding the decision that the conservation status could not be revoked under the scheme. In August 2017 Regional Council withdrew its support for the scheme and wrote off $14m it had invested in it.

== See also ==
- List of rivers of New Zealand
