= Maraetōtara River =

River in the Hawke's Bay Region, New Zealand

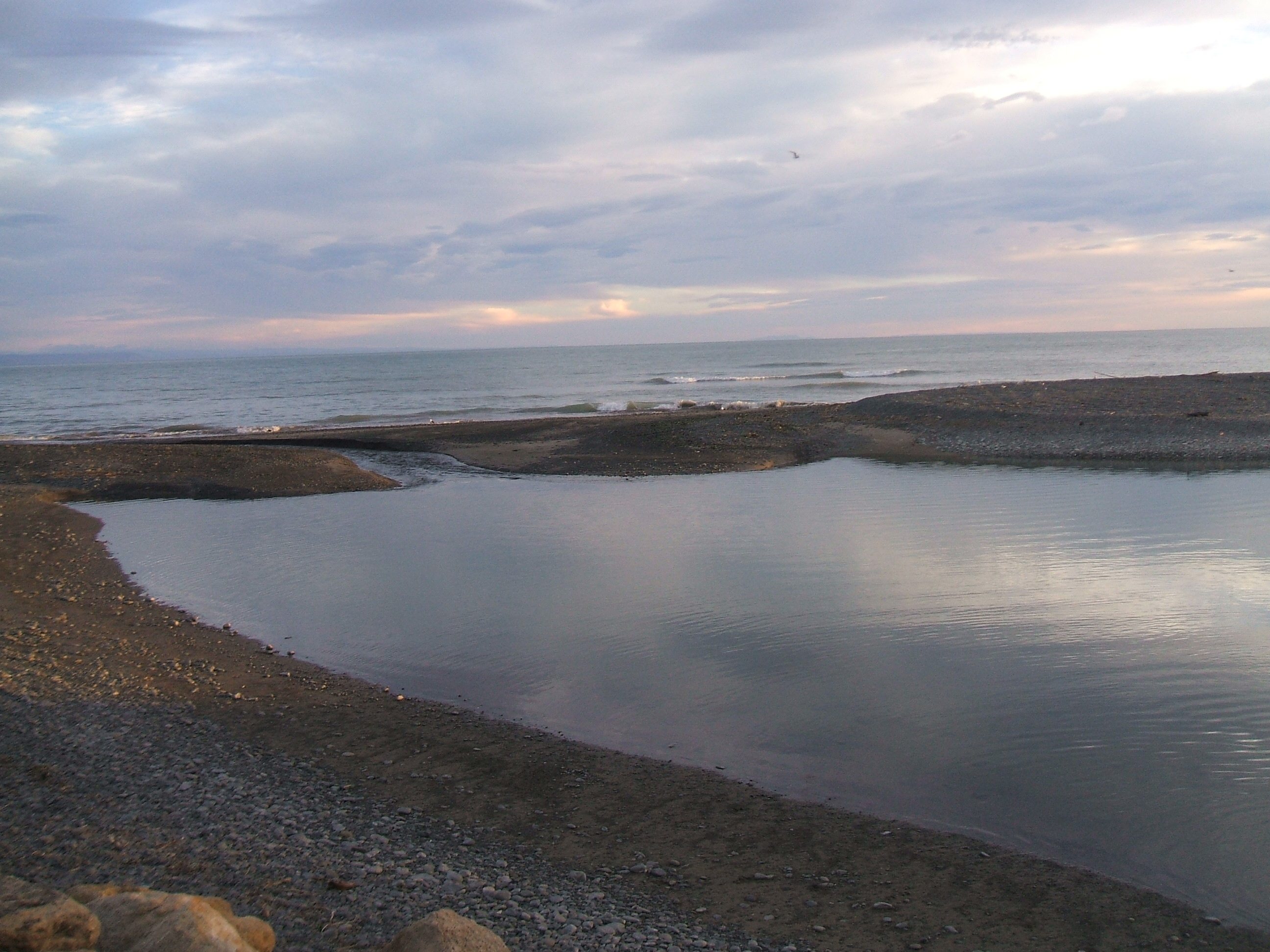
- Maraetōtara River mouth
- Route of the Maraetōtara River
- Mouth of the Maraetōtara River Maraetōtara River (North Island)
- Native name: Maraetōtara (Māori)

Location
- Country: New Zealand
- Island: North Island
- Region: Hawke's Bay
- District: Hastings

Physical characteristics
- Source
  - coordinates: 39.87533°S 176.87894°E
  - elevation: 300 m (980 ft)
- Mouth: Hawke Bay
  - location: Te Awanga
  - coordinates: 39°37′56″S 176°59′14″E
  - elevation: Sea level
- Length: 43 km (27 mi)

Basin features
- Progression: Maraetōtara River → Hawke Bay → Pacific Ocean
- River system: Maraetōtara River Catchment
- Tributaries
  - left: Ngāmangatawa Stream
- Waterbodies: Maraetōtara Falls
- Bridges: Bridge near 1630 Maraetotara Road Bridge, bridge near 1520 Maraetotara Road Bridge, bridge near 3820 Maraetotara Road Bridge, Waimarama Road Bridge, Clifton Road Bridge

The Maraetōtara River is in the Hawke's Bay region of the North Island of New Zealand. It flows roughly south to north, more or less parallel to and halfway between the larger Tukituki River and the east coast of the island. It enters Hawke Bay at Te Awanga.

== Geography ==
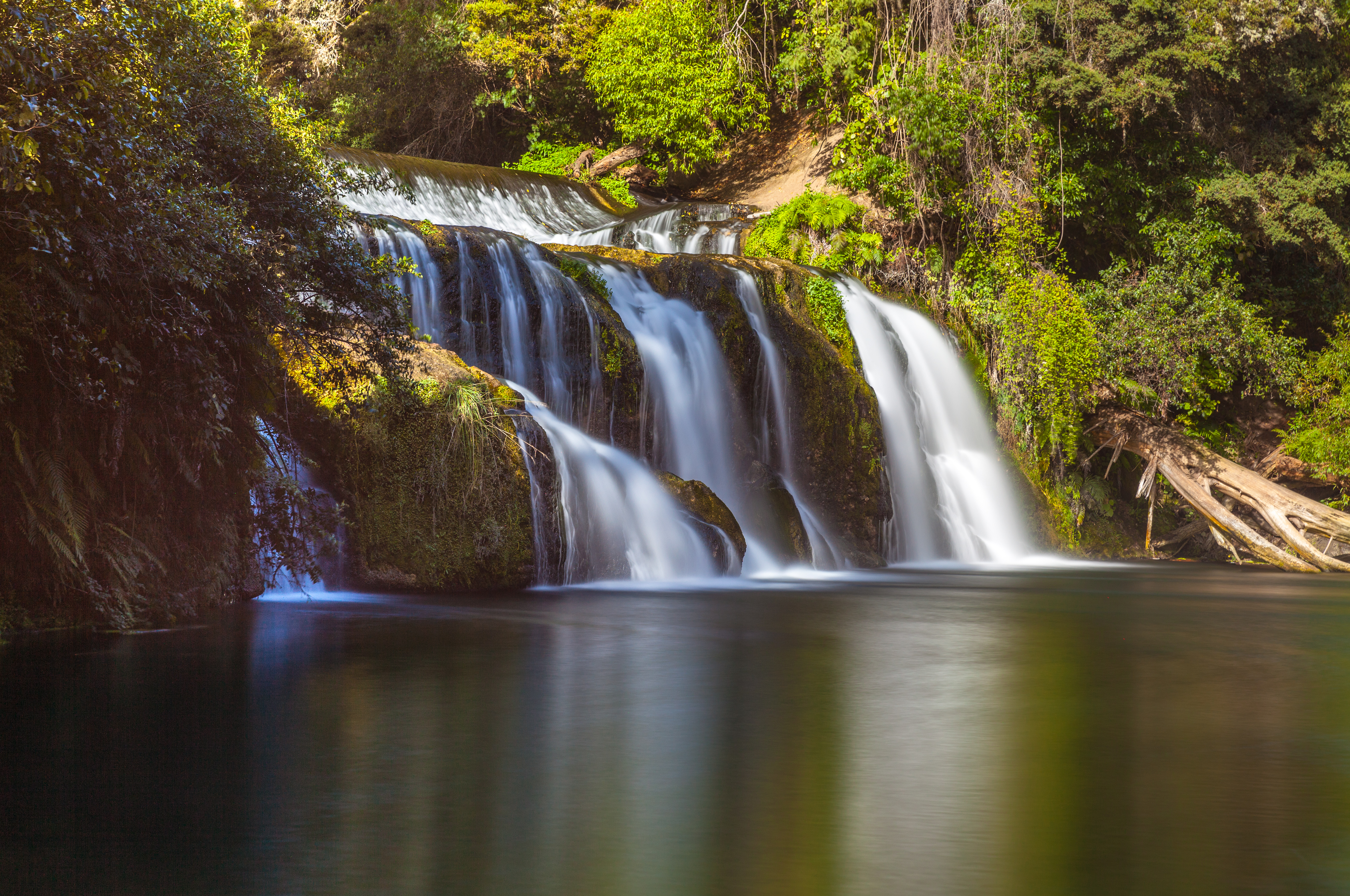
Maraetotara Falls

The river originates from a spring, and flows for 43 km (27 mi) northeast to meet Hawke Bay at Te Awanga. The Maraetōtara Falls is located along the river, and the Mohi Bush Scenic Reserve is located in the river's catchment area.

== See also ==
- List of rivers of New Zealand
