= Clifton, New Zealand =

Clifton in New Zealand may refer to:

- Clifton, Christchurch, a hillside suburb above Sumner in Christchurch
- Clifton, Hawke's Bay, a coastal beach reserve near Napier
- Clifton, Invercargill, a southern suburb of Invercargill
- Clifton, Otago, a locality in Clutha District
- Clifton, Taranaki, a locality in New Plymouth District
- Clifton, Tasman, a locality in Golden Bay
