= Avoca River (Hawke's Bay) =

River in the Hawke's Bay Region, New Zealand

- Route of the Avoca River
- Mouth of the Avoca River Avoca River (Hawke's Bay) (North Island)

Location
- Country: New Zealand
- Island: North Island
- Region: Hawke's Bay
- District: Central Hawke's Bay

Physical characteristics
- Source
  - coordinates: 39.90233°S 176.22868°E
  - elevation: 530 m (1,740 ft)
- Mouth: Tukipō River
  - coordinates: 39°55′44″S 176°18′06″E
  - elevation: 295 m (968 ft)
- Length: 10 km (6.2 mi)

Basin features
- Progression: Avoca River → Tukipō River → Tukituki River → Tukituki Estuary → Hawke Bay → Pacific Ocean

The Avoca River is a river in the southern Hawke's Bay region of New Zealand. It flows southeast through farmland to meet the Tukipō River at A'Deanes Reserve.

== See also ==
- List of rivers of New Zealand
