= Te Mata Peak =

Mountain in New Zealand

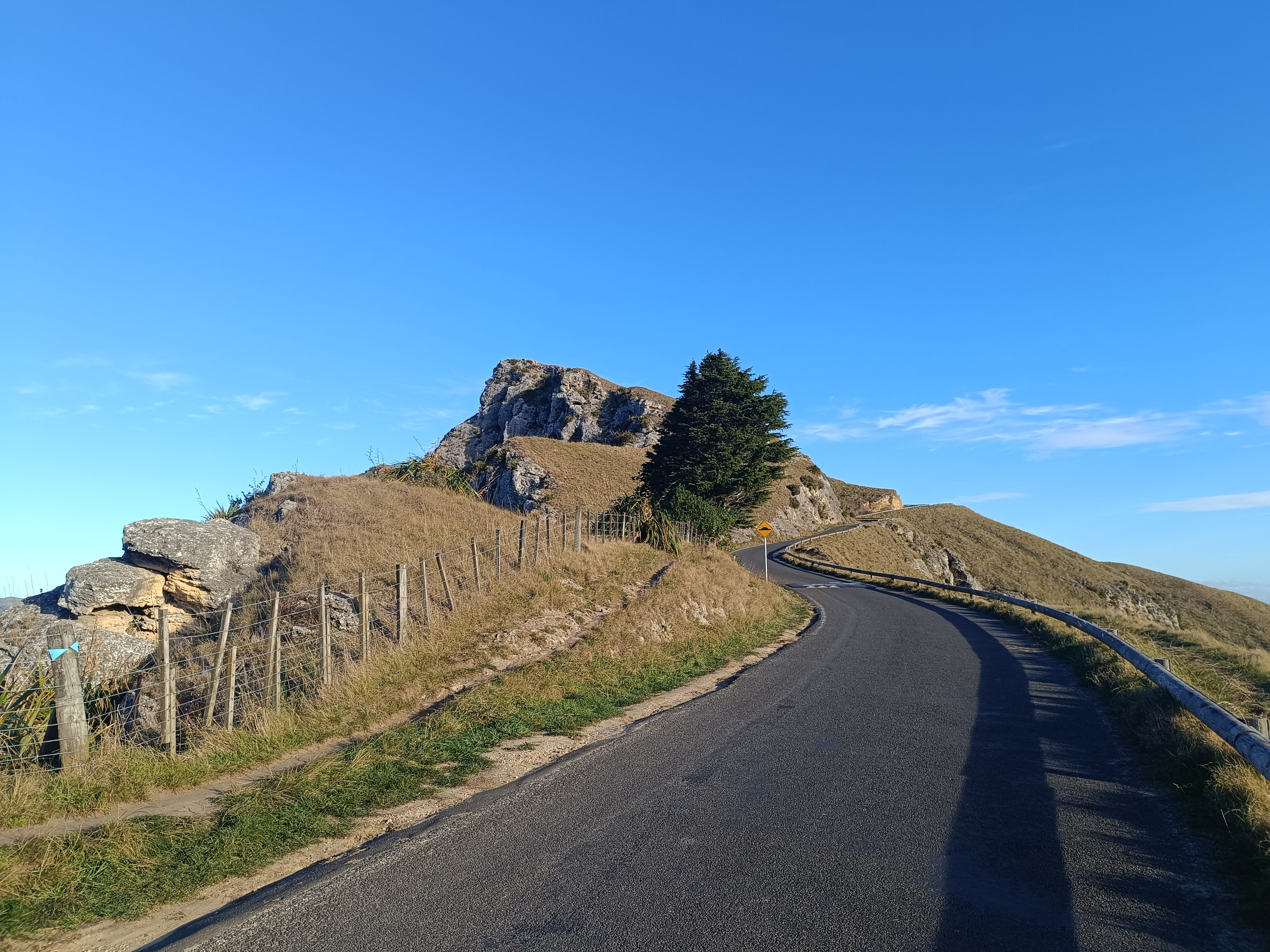
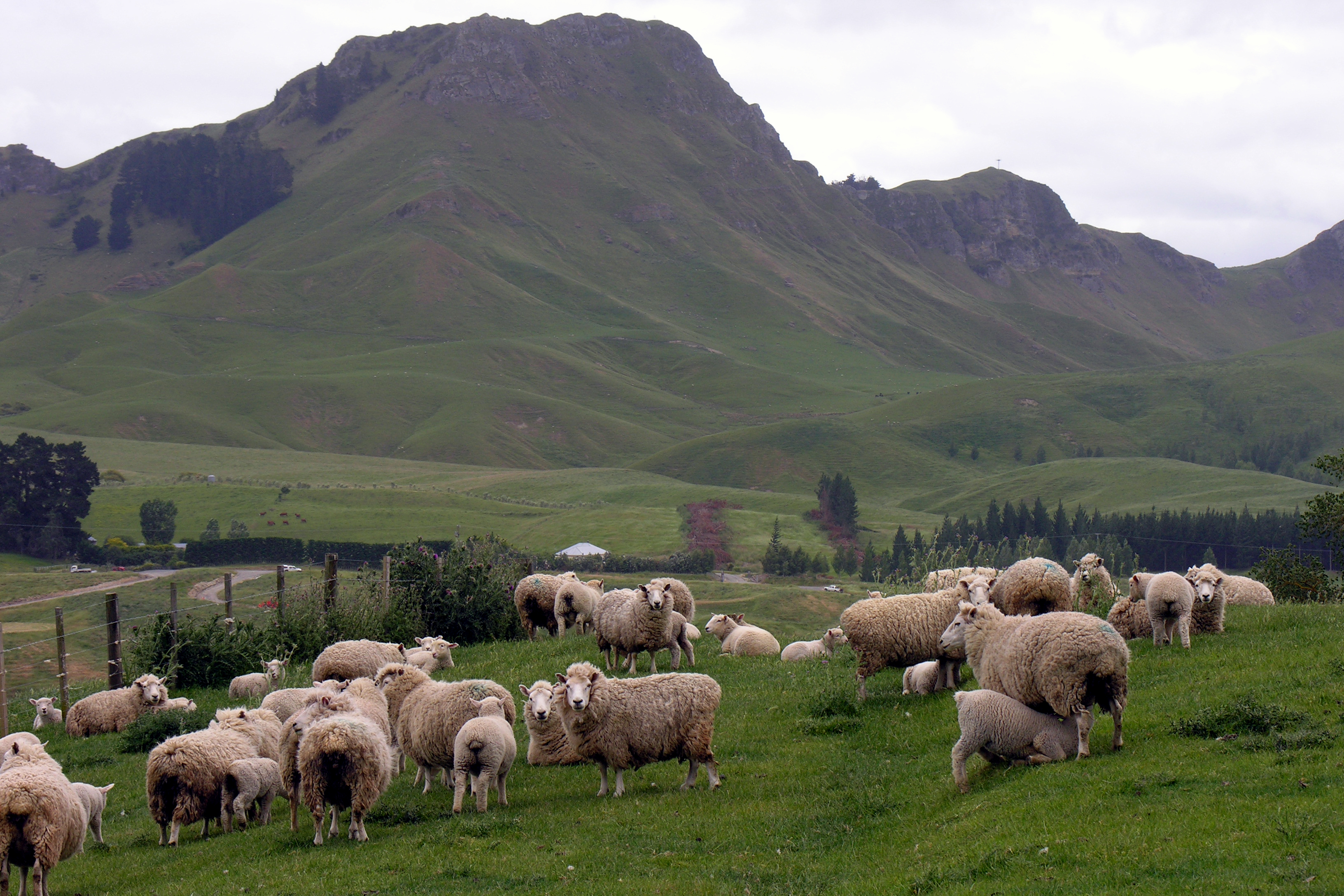
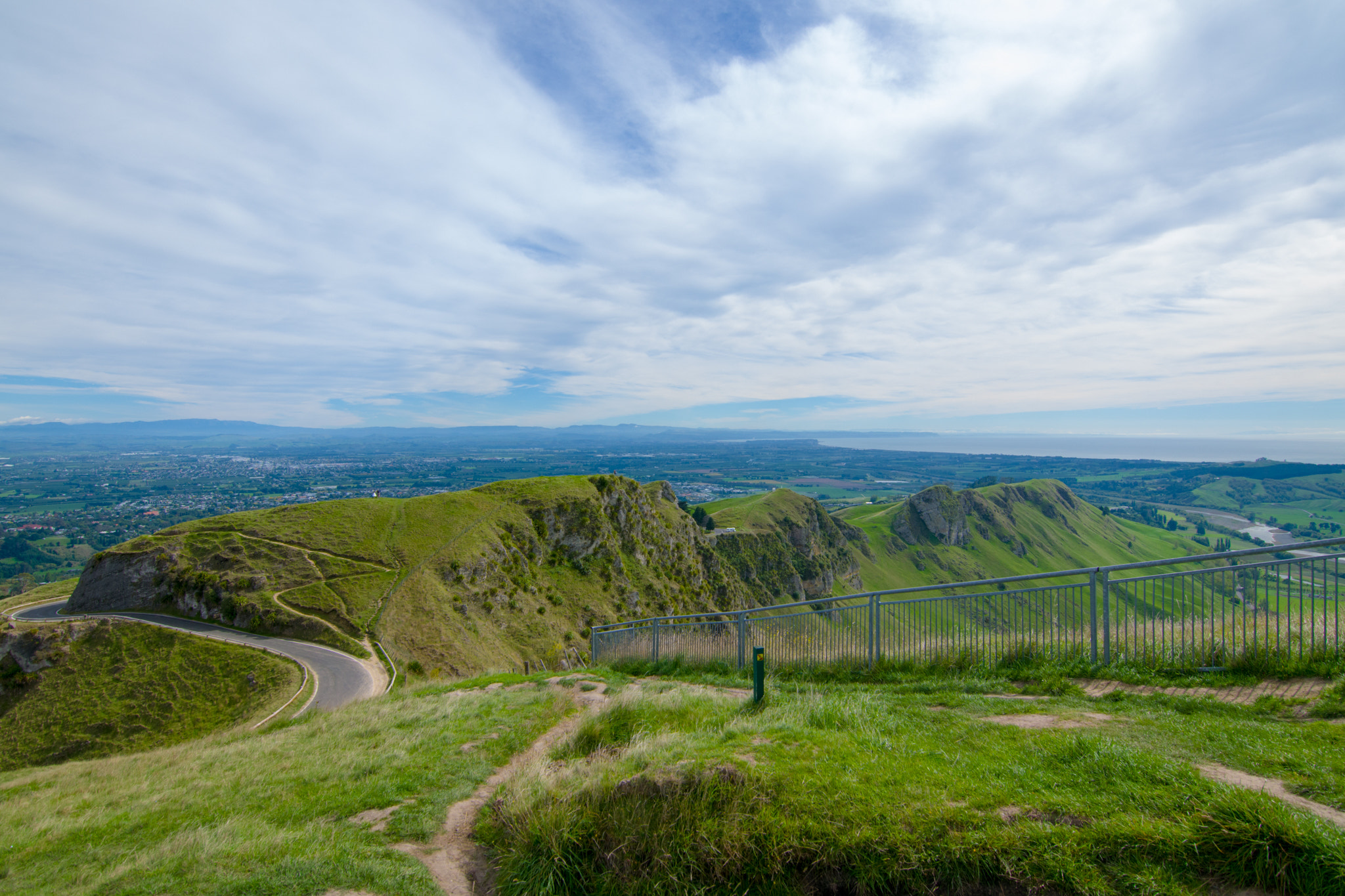
- Peak from up close Peak from Tuki Tuki View from the Peak

Highest point
- Elevation: 399 m (1,309 ft)
- Coordinates: 39°42′05″S 176°54′33″E

Geography
- Location within North Island
- Location: Hawke's Bay, New Zealand

Climbing
- Easiest route: Road

Te Mata Peak is a peak south of Hastings rising to 399m in the Te Mata Hills in the Hawke's Bay region of New Zealand. A sealed road leads to the popular lookout at the summit, as well as many trails for hikers and mountain bikers. The Hastings suburb of Havelock North is situated at the base of the peak. Te Mata Peak and the surrounding range run in a North-East to South-West direction. The slopes on the North-Western side build up gradually. Havelock North is built upon the rolling hills at the lower extent of the ranges. The topography of the South-Eastern side has been heavily influenced by the Tukituki River, forming the Tukituki Valley. From Te Mata Peak, cliffs on the South-Eastern side drop 140 metres before extending into the rolling hills of the Tukituki Valley, making these cliffs some of the highest in the North Island of New Zealand. Their height is subject to erosion, with multiple instances of rockfall into the valley below. From the peak, large boulders can be seen in the valley as evidence of previous rockfall.

As the highest peak in the area, it offers views over the Heretaunga Plains and Hawke's Bay, including Napier. On a clear day, the view stretches as far as Mount Ruapehu and Māhia Peninsula. Beneath Te Mata Peak rests the Craggy Range vineyard and the Tukituki River.

The name originates from the name of the hillscape in Māori, Te Mata-o-Rongokako, or "the face of Rongokako". Rongokako was an ancestor of the Ngāti Kahungunu, and the area is believed to be his final resting place. When looking at the peak from the north, it appears to be the silhouette of a person lying down, which is said to be Rongokako. European settlers called the peak the "Sleeping Giant", a name which is still in use today.

The government bought the land from the local iwi in 1850, and it was subsequently purchased by John Chambers in the 1850s for use as a farming station. The land was gifted to the public as a park in perpetuity in 1927 by his descendants.

In October 2019, the Hastings District Council began work on filling in 1.3 km (0.81 mi) of a controversial walking track. The track had been cut by Craggy Range Winery in 2017, the local council having granted consent without informing the local iwi.
