= Te Awanga =

Settlement in Hawke's Bay Region, New Zealand

- Town
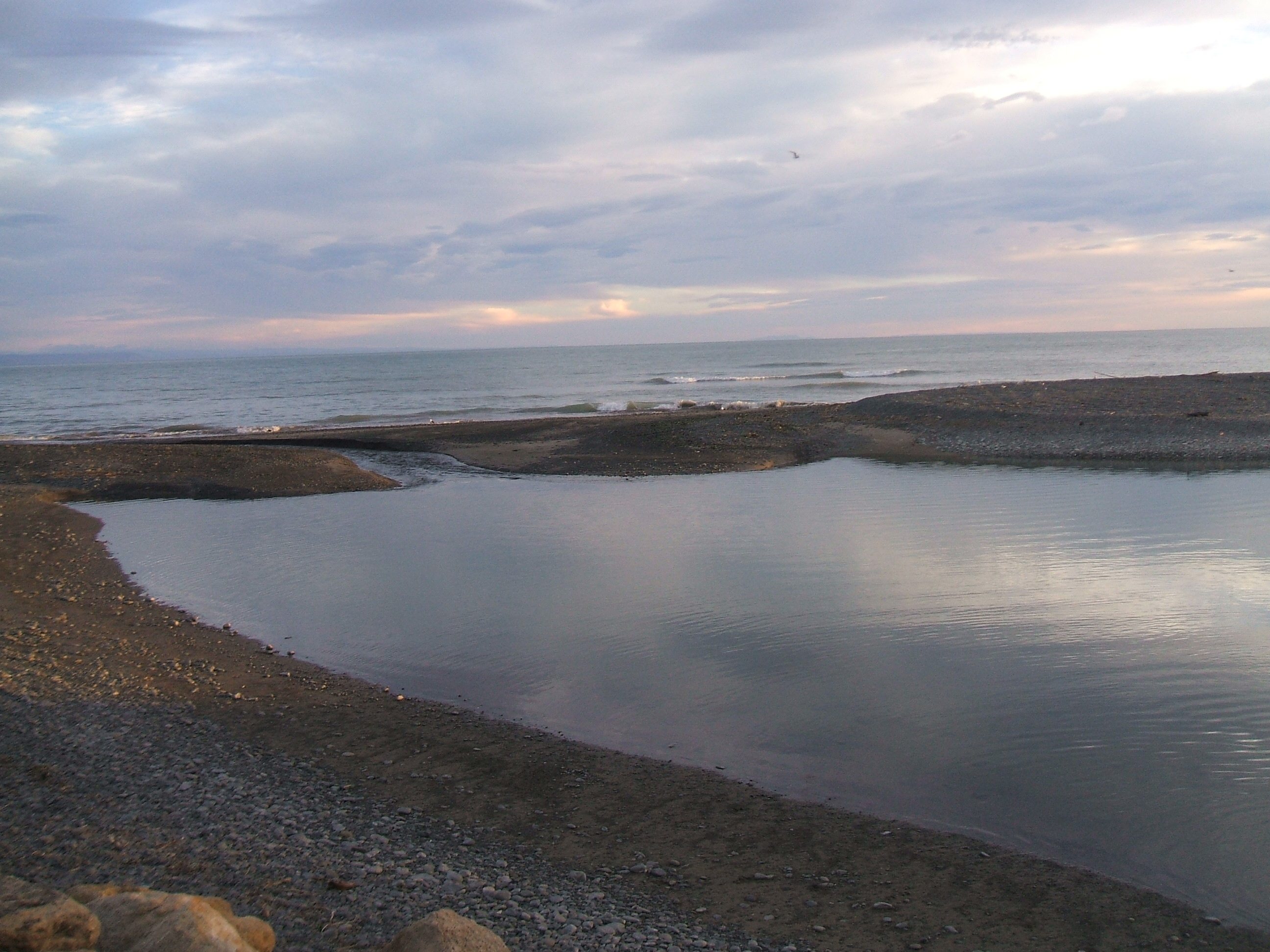
- Maraetotara River mouth
- Interactive map of Te Awanga
- Coordinates: 39°38′S 176°59′E
- Country: New Zealand
- Region: Hawke's Bay
- Territorial authority: Hastings District
- Ward: Heretaunga General Ward; Takitimu Māori Ward
- Electorates: Tukituki; Ikaroa-Rāwhiti (Māori)

Government
  - Territorial Authority: Hastings District Council
  - Regional council: Hawke's Bay Regional Council
  - Mayor of Hastings: Wendy Schollum
  - Tukituki MP: Catherine Wedd
  - Ikaroa-Rāwhiti MP: Cushla Tangaere-Manuel

Area
  - Total: 1.33 km^{2} (0.51 sq mi)

Population (June 2025)
  - Total: 690
  - Density: 520/km^{2} (1,300/sq mi)

Te Awanga is a small rural beachside town in Hawke's Bay, New Zealand. Te Awanga is near Cape Kidnappers, which has a renowned colony of the Australasian gannet.

Te Awanga town is just smaller than Haumoana, which is further along the beach towards Napier. The town was developed as a holiday settlement. There are shops, cafes and wineries located nearby to the town. Activities which are common at Te Awanga include fishing, swimming, surfing and boating. Surfing is popular when large easterly swells move into Hawke Bay. The 18 hole world-famous Cape Kidnappers Golf Course is located near Te Awanga.

Te Awanga is located at 39°S 177°E on Hawke Bay on the east coast of New Zealand. The town is located sixteen kilometres south of the centre of Napier and twelve kilometres east of the centre of Hastings. It is ten kilometres west of Cape Kidnappers. The road towards Cape Kidnappers, Clifton Road, passes through Te Awanga on its way to Clifton. The Maraetotara River mouth is at Te Awanga.

Te Awanga is located in an area which can be prone to coastal erosion. The Te Awanga shoreline can be eroded by stormy seas and high tides. The long term shoreline retreat is due to erosion caused by the sea at Te Awanga is on average between 0.30m and 0.70m per year. However, this rate was challenged and debunked in court circa 1988.

== Demographics ==
Statistics New Zealand describes Te Awanga as a rural settlement, which covers 1.33 km^{2} (0.51 sq mi). It had an estimated population of 690 as of June 2025, with a population density of 519 people per km^{2}.

Historical population
Year	Pop.	±% p.a.
2006	726	—
2013	696	−0.60%
2018	723	+0.76%
2023	687	−1.02%
The 2006 population is for a larger area of 2.90 km^{2}. Source:

Te Awanga had a population of 687 in the 2023 New Zealand census, a decrease of 36 people (−5.0%) since the 2018 census, and a decrease of 9 people (−1.3%) since the 2013 census. There were 348 males and 336 females in 294 dwellings. 3.1% of people identified as LGBTIQ+. The median age was 51.2 years (compared with 38.1 years nationally). There were 105 people (15.3%) aged under 15 years, 78 (11.4%) aged 15 to 29, 327 (47.6%) aged 30 to 64, and 174 (25.3%) aged 65 or older.

People could identify as more than one ethnicity. The results were 91.7% European (Pākehā); 14.0% Māori; 2.2% Pasifika; 1.7% Asian; 1.3% Middle Eastern, Latin American and African New Zealanders (MELAA); and 3.1% other, which includes people giving their ethnicity as "New Zealander". English was spoken by 98.3%, Māori by 3.1%, and other languages by 5.2%. No language could be spoken by 0.9% (e.g. too young to talk). New Zealand Sign Language was known by 0.4%. The percentage of people born overseas was 14.8, compared with 28.8% nationally.

Religious affiliations were 24.9% Christian, 0.4% Hindu, 0.4% Māori religious beliefs, 1.3% Buddhist, 0.9% New Age, 0.4% Jewish, and 0.9% other religions. People who answered that they had no religion were 65.1%, and 5.7% of people did not answer the census question.

Of those at least 15 years old, 153 (26.3%) people had a bachelor's or higher degree, 327 (56.2%) had a post-high school certificate or diploma, and 108 (18.6%) people exclusively held high school qualifications. The median income was $39,200, compared with $41,500 nationally. 75 people (12.9%) earned over $100,000 compared to 12.1% nationally. The employment status of those at least 15 was 279 (47.9%) full-time, 99 (17.0%) part-time, and 9 (1.5%) unemployed.
