= Haumoana =

Settlement in Hawke's Bay Region, New Zealand

- Town
- Haumoana Street Welcome sign Elixir of Life Memorial Arch Memorial Park View towards Napier from Haumoana Domain
- Interactive map of Haumoana
- Coordinates: 39°37′S 176°57′E
- Country: New Zealand
- Region: Hawke's Bay
- Territorial authority: Hastings District

Government
  - Territorial authority: Hastings District Council
  - Mayor of Hastings: Wendy Schollum

Area
  - Total: 1.83 km^{2} (0.71 sq mi)

Population (June 2025)
  - Total: 1,150
  - Density: 628/km^{2} (1,630/sq mi)

Haumoana is a coastal town just south of the Tukituki River outlet in Hawke Bay on the east coast of New Zealand's North Island. It is located 12 km south of Napier and ten kilometres east of Hastings. The village incorporates a school, a Presbyterian Church, a general store, a takeaway shop, a hall and a fire station. The village was developed as a holiday settlement with beaches, and the surrounding area has historically been used for sheep and cattle grazing and horticulture. However, lifestyle blocks and grape growing have become more prominent in recent times. Many inhabitants commute to the nearby cities to work. There are approximately 430 houses in Haumoana. The population at the 2013 census was 2256, an increase of 54 people since 2006.

The New Zealand Ministry for Culture and Heritage gives a translation of "sea breeze" for Haumoana.

The area is flat and low lying, with hills to the southwest. The underlying soil material has been laid down by rivers and the sea margin. Particle size ranges from gravel to clay. Nearer the beach the area is underlain by free draining sandy-gravels but further inland the gravels are overlain by poor draining silt and clay rich soils. Parts of the beach are experiencing coastal erosion of 0.7 metres per year, which resulted in the removal of several houses along the gravel beach crest, and other beach front properties being inundated during heavy swells and high tides.

Due to its location near the beach in an area prone to coastal erosion, parts of the beach at Haumoana is being eroded. The long term shoreline retreat at Haumoana is on average between 0.30 m and 0.70 m per year. This rate of erosion is the same as it is at Te Awanga further down the Bay coastline. The coastal erosion rate at Clifton south of Te Awanga is slightly higher.

Haumoana has a reticulated water supply managed by the Hastings District Council. An estimated 3% gain their water independently through rain water collection or from individual water bores. Wastewater is disposed using individual septic tanks.

== Demographics ==
Statistics New Zealand describes Haumoana as a rural settlement, which covers 1.83 km^{2} (0.71 sq mi). It had an estimated population of 1,150 as of June 2025, with a population density of 628 people per km^{2}.

Historical population for Haumoana
| Year | Pop. | ±% p.a. |
|---|---|---|
| 2006 | 912 | — |
| 2013 | 1,119 | +2.97% |
| 2018 | 1,083 | −0.65% |
| 2023 | 1,146 | +1.14% |
The 2006 population is for a larger area of 2.48 km^{2}. Source:

Haumoana had a population of 1,146 in the 2023 New Zealand census, an increase of 63 people (5.8%) since the 2018 census, and an increase of 27 people (2.4%) since the 2013 census. There were 573 males and 570 females in 423 dwellings. 2.4% of people identified as LGBTIQ+. The median age was 42.3 years (compared with 38.1 years nationally). There were 228 people (19.9%) aged under 15 years, 147 (12.8%) aged 15 to 29, 576 (50.3%) aged 30 to 64, and 198 (17.3%) aged 65 or older.

People could identify as more than one ethnicity. The results were 85.6% European (Pākehā); 20.9% Māori; 2.6% Pasifika; 3.9% Asian; 1.0% Middle Eastern, Latin American and African New Zealanders (MELAA); and 2.4% other, which includes people giving their ethnicity as "New Zealander". English was spoken by 97.1%, Māori by 5.0%, and other languages by 7.3%. No language could be spoken by 2.4% (e.g. too young to talk). New Zealand Sign Language was known by 0.8%. The percentage of people born overseas was 18.6, compared with 28.8% nationally.

Religious affiliations were 20.9% Christian, 0.3% Hindu, 0.8% Islam, 2.9% Māori religious beliefs, 0.8% Buddhist, 0.3% New Age, and 1.3% other religions. People who answered that they had no religion were 67.3%, and 6.0% of people did not answer the census question.

Of those at least 15 years old, 228 (24.8%) people had a bachelor's or higher degree, 504 (54.9%) had a post-high school certificate or diploma, and 189 (20.6%) people exclusively held high school qualifications. The median income was $46,400, compared with $41,500 nationally. 102 people (11.1%) earned over $100,000 compared to 12.1% nationally. The employment status of those at least 15 was 492 (53.6%) full-time, 150 (16.3%) part-time, and 24 (2.6%) unemployed.

== Education ==
Haumoana School is a co-educational Year 1–6 state primary school, with a roll of 155 as of July 2026. The school opened in 1921.

== Notable people ==
- John Scott, architect
- Paul Holmes, media personality
