= Cape Kidnappers Golf Course =

Golf course in the Hawke's Bay Region, New Zealand

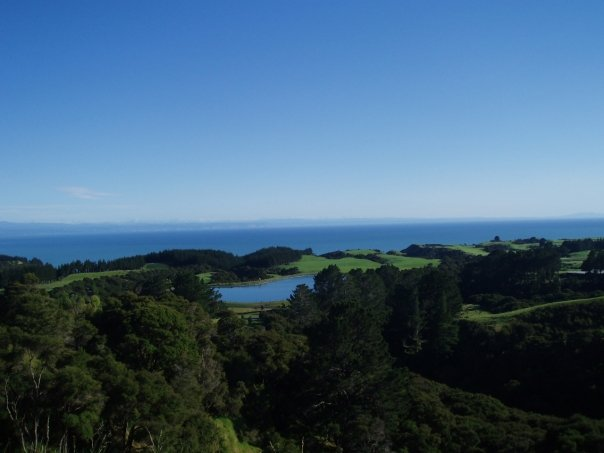
- View of the Cape Kidnappers Golf Course (far right)
- Interactive map of Cape Kidnappers Golf Course
- 39°39′14″S 177°02′31″E

Club information
- Location: Te Awanga, Hastings District, Hawke's Bay Region, New Zealand
- Established: 2004
- Total holes: 18

Cape Kidnappers Golf Course is an 18-hole course near Te Awanga, Hawkes Bay, New Zealand. It takes its name from the nearby headland of Cape Kidnappers. It was designed by Tom Doak in 2004 and was funded by American developer Julian Robertson. In 2007, Golf Digest magazine rated Cape Kidnappers the 10th best course outside of the United States.
