= Cape Kidnappers =

Point in New Zealand

Cape Kidnappers / Te Kauwae-a-Māui: Māori: Te Kauwae-a-Māui for "the jawbone of Māui"; Te Matau-a-Māui for "the fish hook of Māui"
- Cape
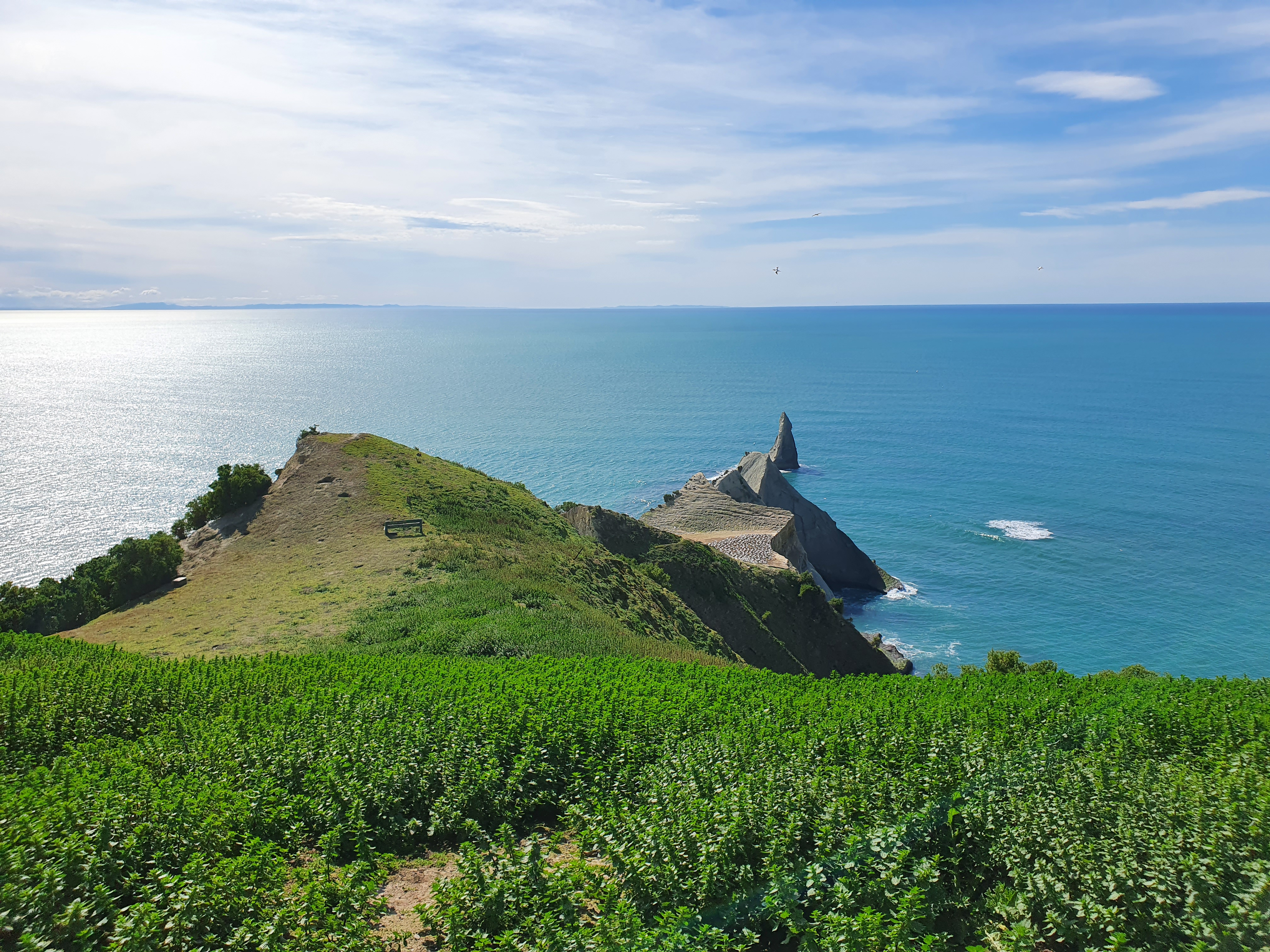
- Looking northeast towards Cape Kidnappers

- Location within New Zealand
- Coordinates: 39.6447°S 177.0932°E
- Water bodies: South Pacific Ocean
- Formed by: Erosion
- Geology: Mudstone

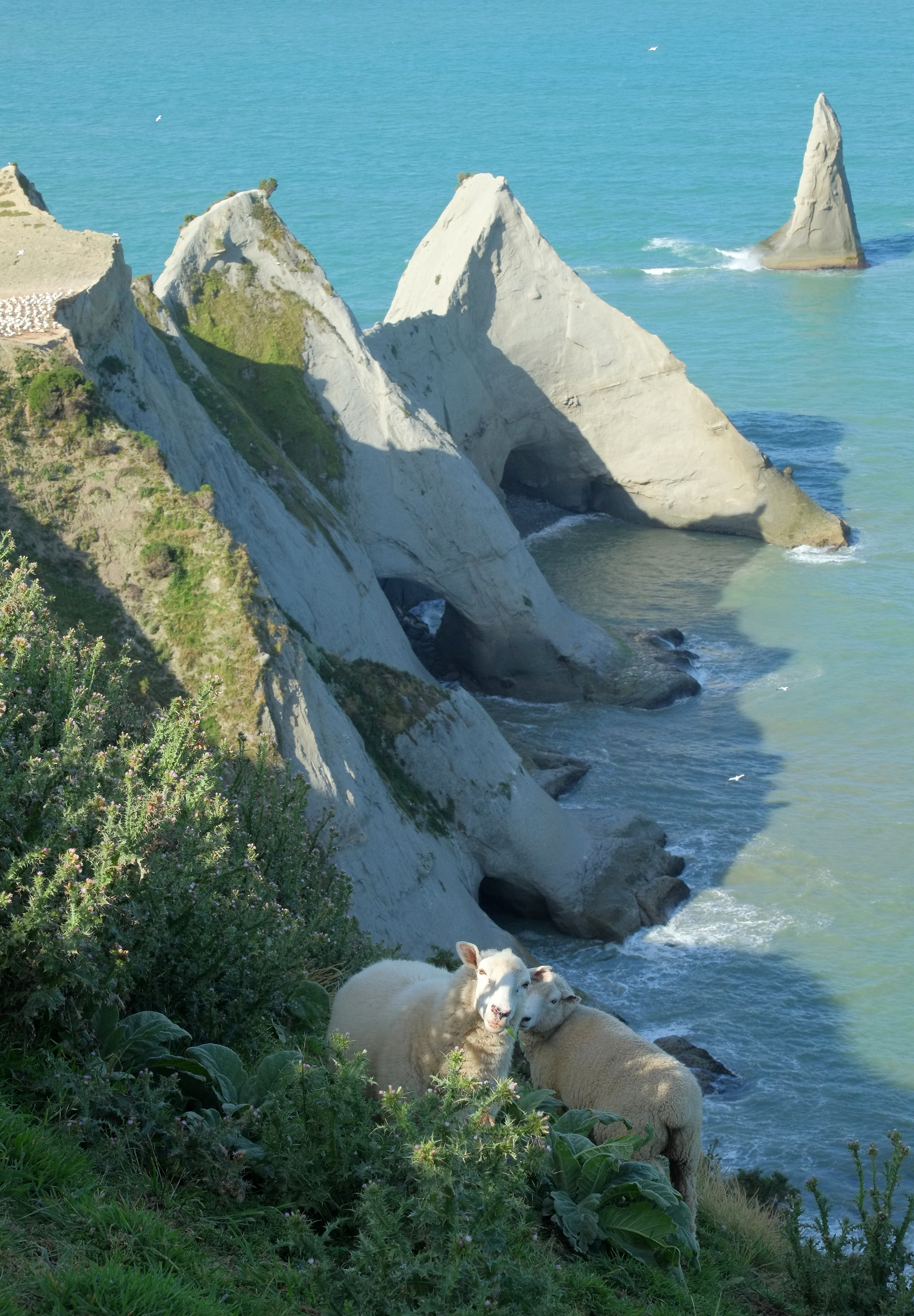
Sheep grazing at the cape

Cape Kidnappers, known in Māori as Te Kauwae-a-Māui, and officially named Cape Kidnappers / Te Kauwae-a-Māui, is a headland at the southern extremity of Hawke Bay on the east coast of New Zealand's North Island. It is at the end of an 8-kilometre (5 mi) peninsula that protrudes into the Pacific Ocean, and 20 kilometres (12 mi) south-east of the city of Napier. The cliffs towards the cape are made up of sandstone, conglomerate, mudstone, river gravel, pumice and silt.

The cape is a breeding site for over 6,500 pairs of Australasian gannets, the largest and most accessible mainland gannet colony in the world. Road access ends at Clifton, which is the departure point for many tourists visiting the colony.

The Cape Kidnappers Golf Course lies between the nearby coastal community of Te Awanga and the headland. The land surrounding the cape and the gannet colony comprises large working farms grazing sheep and cattle. The peninsula, including farm land and the bird colony locations, is enclosed in a predator-proof fence built in 2007 to prevent introduced predators such stoats, ferrets, and feral cats re-invading the headland after a successful and still ongoing pest-control programme.

== History ==
The headland was named after an attempt by local Māori to, according to Captain Cook, abduct a member of Cook's crew aboard HMS Endeavour, during a landfall there on 15 October 1769. The crew member was Taiata, the 12-year-old nephew or servant of Tupaia, the Tahitian arioi who served as the Endeavour's interpreter and guide. Cook's journal states that Taiata was over the side of the ship when a Maori fishing vessel approached the Endeavour offering to trade fish, before seizing the boy and attempting to flee with him. Sailors from Endeavour′s deck immediately opened fire on the fishing boat, killing two Māori and wounding a third.

Ngāti Te Whatuiāpiti's perspective is that the rangatira Te Rangikoianake and his son Hawea led a rescue party to free what they thought was a young Māori boy being held captive on the ship. This history was acknowledged in the 2015 Heretaunga Tamatea Deed of Settlement with the Crown.

Taiata promptly jumped overboard and swam back to Endeavour, while the remaining Māori paddled their craft back to shore. A 4-pounder cannon was fired after them from Endeavour′s quarterdeck, but the Māori boat was soon out of range.

… one of the fishing boat came along side and offer’d us some more fish, the Indian Boy Tiata, Tupia’s servant being over the side, they seized hold of him, pulld him into the boat and endeavourd to carry him off, this obliged us to fire upon them which gave the Boy an opportunity to jump over board and we brought the Ship too, lower’d a boat into the Water and took him up unhurt. Two or three paid for this daring attempt with the loss of their lives and many more would have suffered had it not been for fear of killing the boy. This affair occation’d my giveing this point of land the name of Cape Kidnappers …

Cook described the cape as having steep white cliffs on either side, with two large rocks resembling hay stacks near the headland.

Following the passage of the Heretaunga Tamatea Claims Settlement Act 2018, the name of the headland was officially altered to Cape Kidnappers / Te Kauwae-a-Māui. The Māori portion of the name refers to 'the fish hook of Māui', referring to a legend in which the North Island is a large fish which was caught by the demigod Māui.

== Important Bird Area ==
The cape has been identified as an Important Bird Area by BirdLife International because it is a breeding site for over 6,500 pairs of Australasian gannets (Morus serrator). The numbers have steadily increased in the past two decades, making this gannet colony the largest and most accessible mainland colony in the world. The gannet nesting season is from mid-September to mid-December, with the juvenile chicks staying as late as May, before migrating to Australia.

Tourists can reach the cape and gannet colony either by walking along the coast or by private minibus tours via an inland road that was built to service the golf course and resort. A tour along the coast on passenger trailers pulled by tractors operated for more than 70 years before closing in 2023. This came after the beach track was closed and the tours suspended for two years following a landslide in 2019 that injured two tourists.

Gannet colony

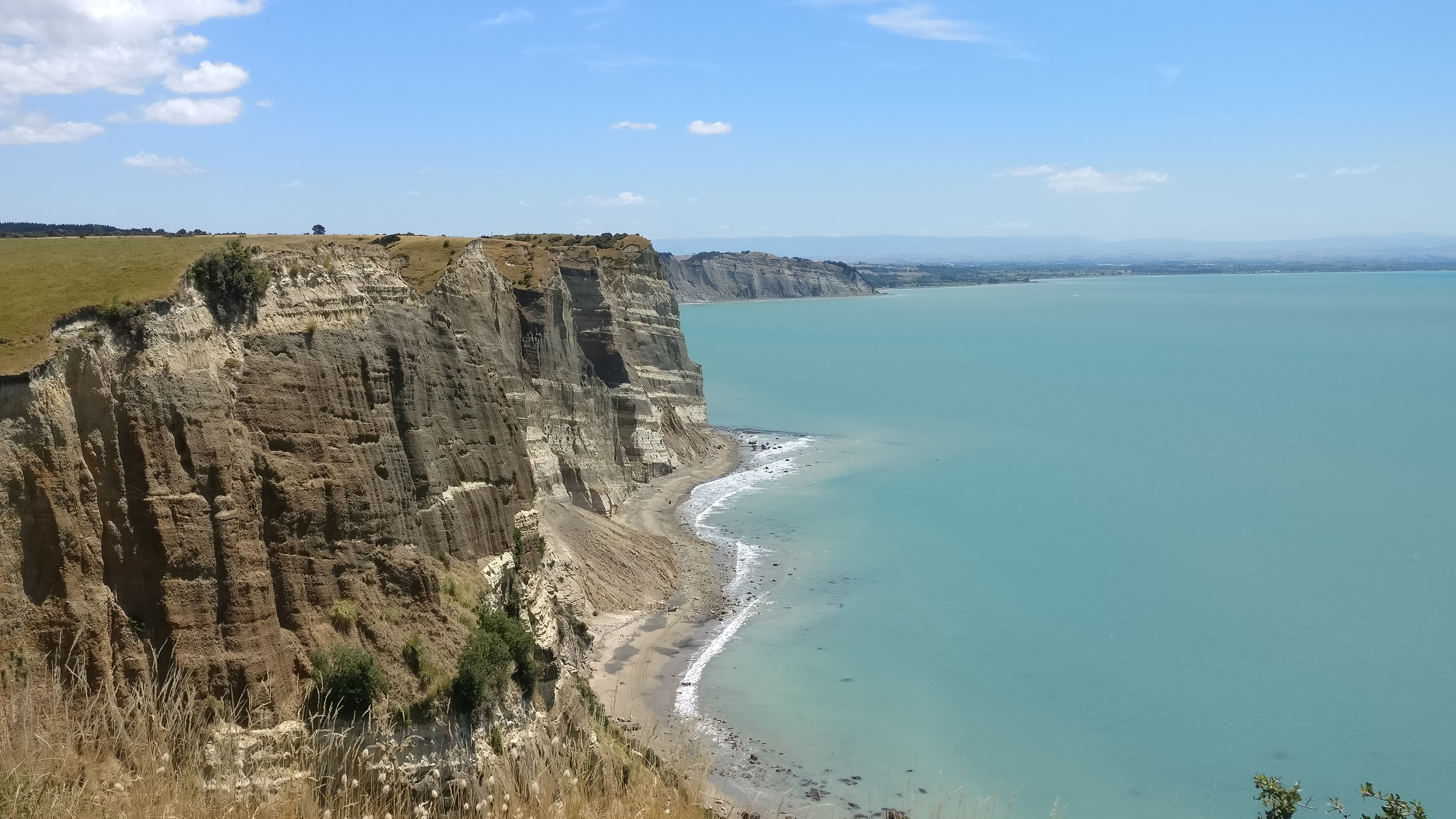
Cliffs showing 2019 landslide

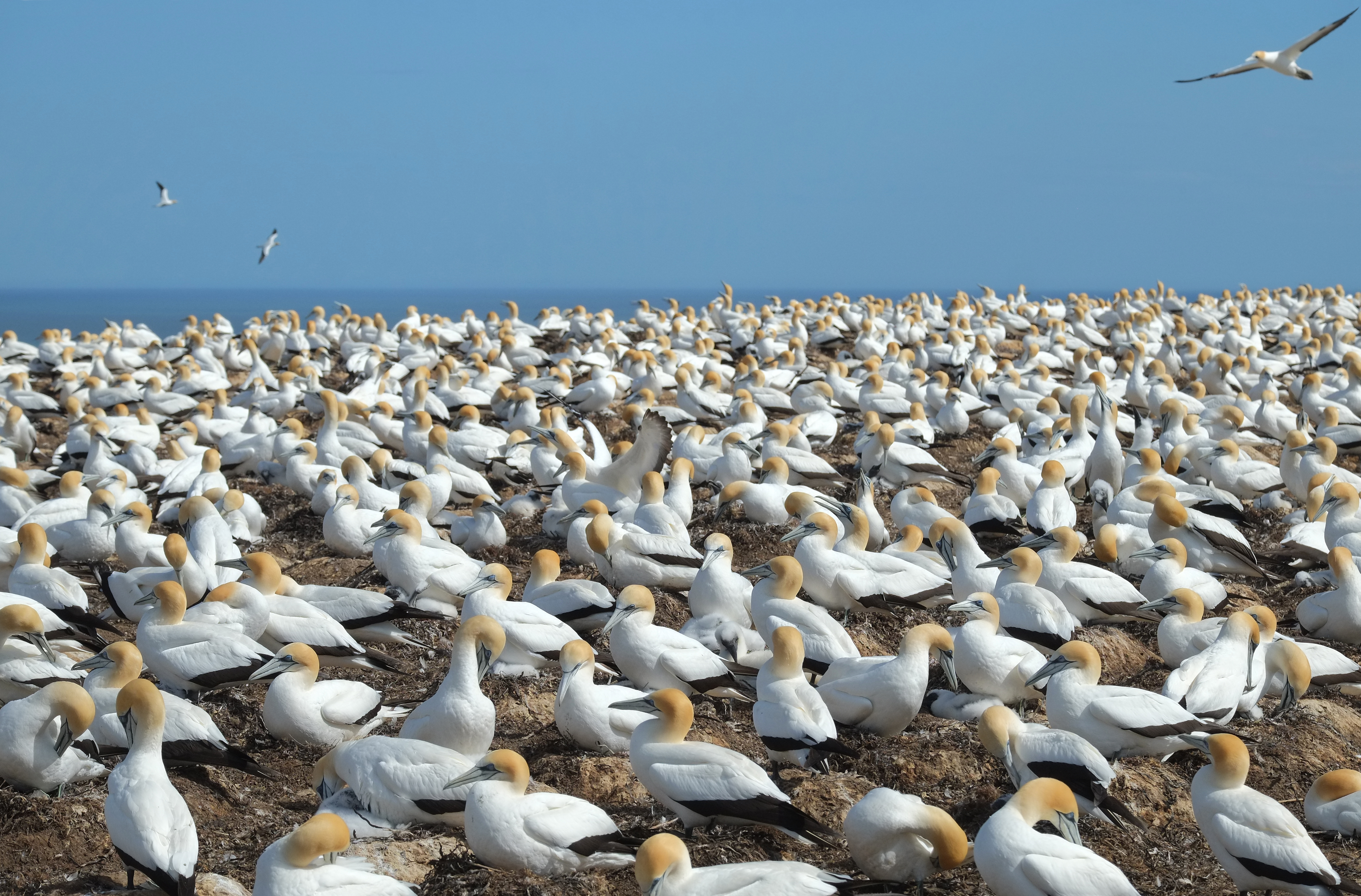
Colony on plateau in spring with nesting adults

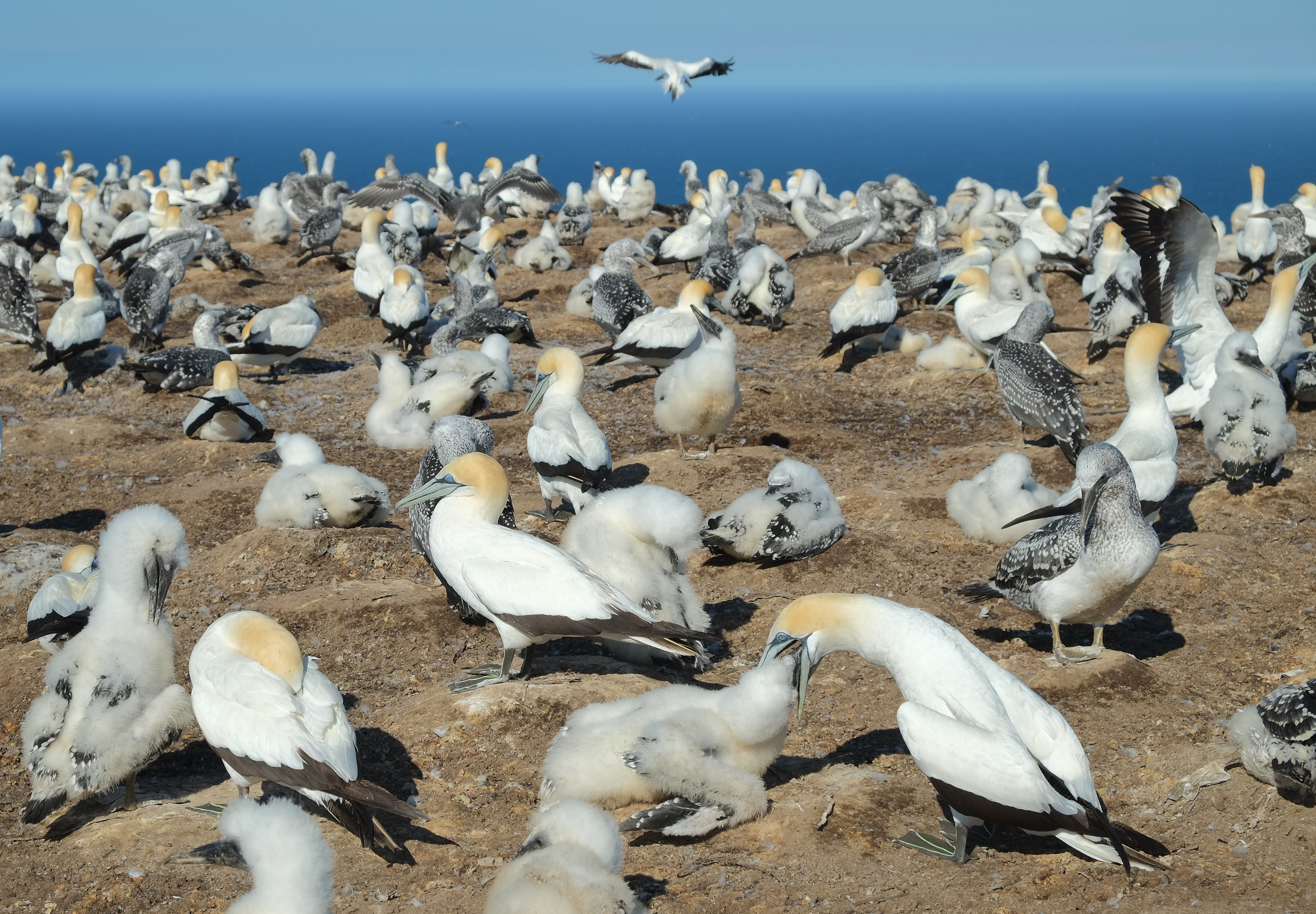
Colony on plateau in summer with older chicks

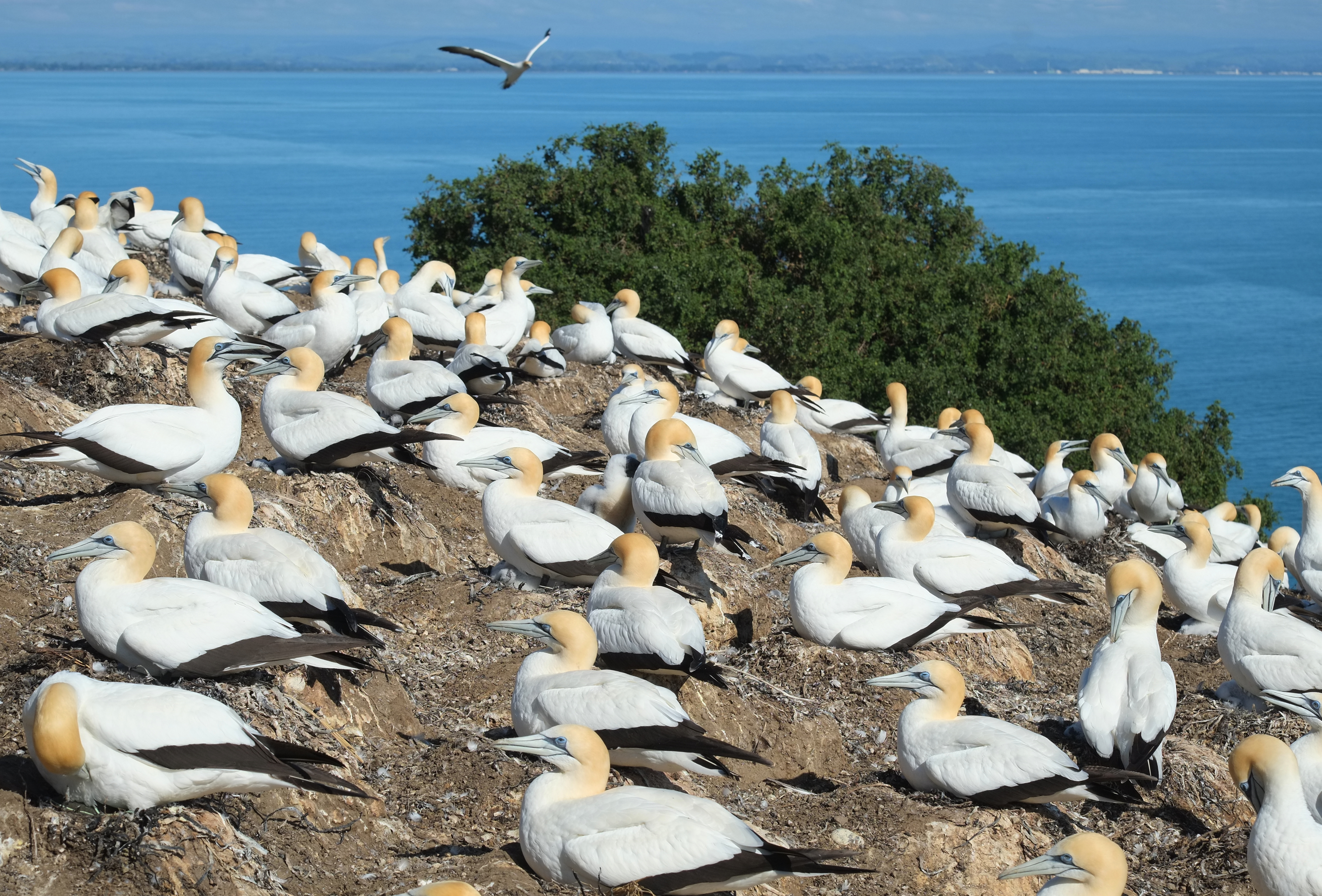
Black Reef colony

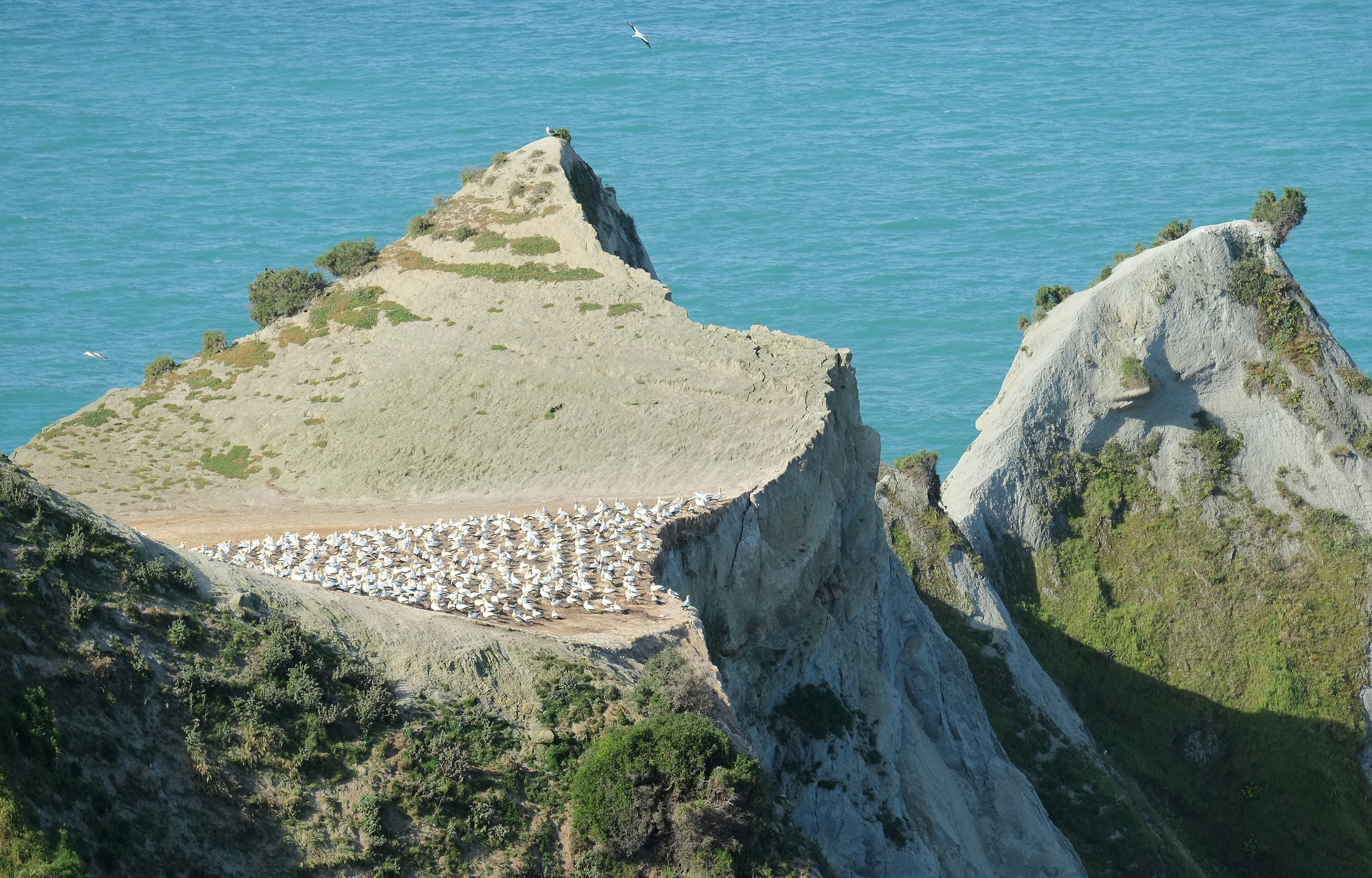
Colony further out on the cape

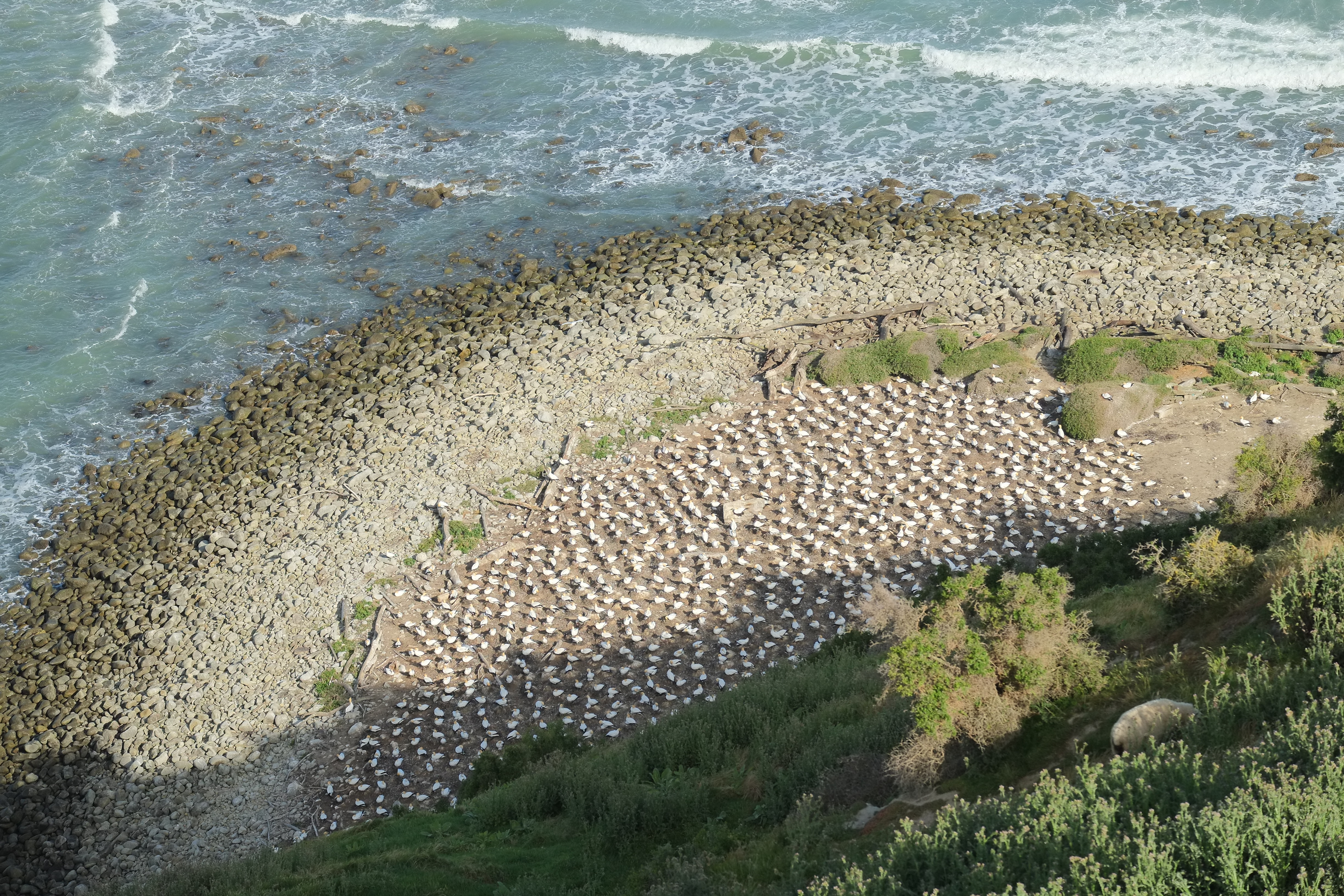
Overflow colony on the shore below

== Climate ==
Climate data for Cape Kidnappers (1991–2020)
Month	Jan	Feb	Mar	Apr	May	Jun	Jul	Aug	Sep	Oct	Nov	Dec	Year
Mean daily maximum °C (°F)	20.6 (69.1)	20.5 (68.9)	19.1 (66.4)	17.1 (62.8)	15.4 (59.7)	13.3 (55.9)	12.3 (54.1)	12.6 (54.7)	14.2 (57.6)	15.8 (60.4)	17.0 (62.6)	18.9 (66.0)	16.4 (61.5)
Daily mean °C (°F)	18.2 (64.8)	18.5 (65.3)	17.0 (62.6)	15.1 (59.2)	13.4 (56.1)	11.2 (52.2)	10.4 (50.7)	10.6 (51.1)	11.8 (53.2)	13.3 (55.9)	14.6 (58.3)	16.6 (61.9)	14.2 (57.6)
Mean daily minimum °C (°F)	15.8 (60.4)	16.4 (61.5)	15.0 (59.0)	13.0 (55.4)	11.3 (52.3)	9.2 (48.6)	8.5 (47.3)	8.5 (47.3)	9.5 (49.1)	10.9 (51.6)	12.3 (54.1)	14.3 (57.7)	12.1 (53.7)
Source: NIWA

== See also ==
- Joseph Bryan Nelson and Kazimierz Wodzicki, who conducted important bird studies there.

== Bibliography ==
- Beaglehole, J. C., ed. (1968). The Journals of Captain James Cook on His Voyages of Discovery, vol. I: The Voyage of the Endeavour 1768–1771. Cambridge University Press. OCLC 223185477.
