= Clifton, Hawke's Bay =

Coastal beach reserve motor camp

Clifton
- Settlement
- View towards Cape Kidnappers Clifton Station Cape Kidnappers sign
- Interactive map of Clifton
- Coordinates: 39.639°S 176.999°E
- Country: New Zealand
- Island: North Island
- Region: Hawke's Bay
- District: Hastings District
- Electorates: Tukituki; Ikaroa-Rāwhiti (Māori)

Government
  - Territorial authority: Hastings District Council
  - Mayor: Wendy Schollum
  - Deputy Mayor: Michael Fowler

Population (June 2025)
  - Total: 690

Clifton is a locality in Hawke's Bay, New Zealand, at the southern end of Hawke Bay. It is thirteen kilometres east of the city centre of Hastings, eighteen kilometres southeast of the city centre of Napier and eight kilometres west of the tip of Cape Kidnappers.

Clifton has a cafe, restaurant and bar, and a car park. Common activities include swimming, boating, kayaking and surfing. Clifton is a starting point for most visitors taking walks or rides to the Cape Kidnappers gannet colony, which is a major tourist attraction. Clifton Road terminates as a car park at the southern end of Clifton and is the departure point for most people visiting the Cape. It is an eight-kilometre walk along the coast from Clifton to the Cape.

It used to have a beachside camping ground, which was divided into the No. 1 camp, nearest to the cape, and the No. 2 camp, where Clifton Road first reaches the beach. The No. 1 camp was located between tree-covered hilly terrain and the beach on a narrow strip of flat land. The No. 1 camp was closed in early 2026 when it was decided that it was at risk of landslides from the hills. The No. 2 camp closed in mid-2026 as it was not financially sustainable without the No. 1 camp.

As Clifton is located near the sea in an area that is very prone to coastal erosion, it faces severe problems with the erosion. The Clifton shoreline is constantly being cut away by stormy seas and high ocean tides and there is now very little land between the sea and the high terrain. The long term shoreline retreat at Clifton Beach is on average 0.75 m per year, higher than coastal erosion rates at Te Awanga and Haumoana further north along the Hawke Bay coastline.
