= Ruahine Forest Park =

Protected area in New Zealand

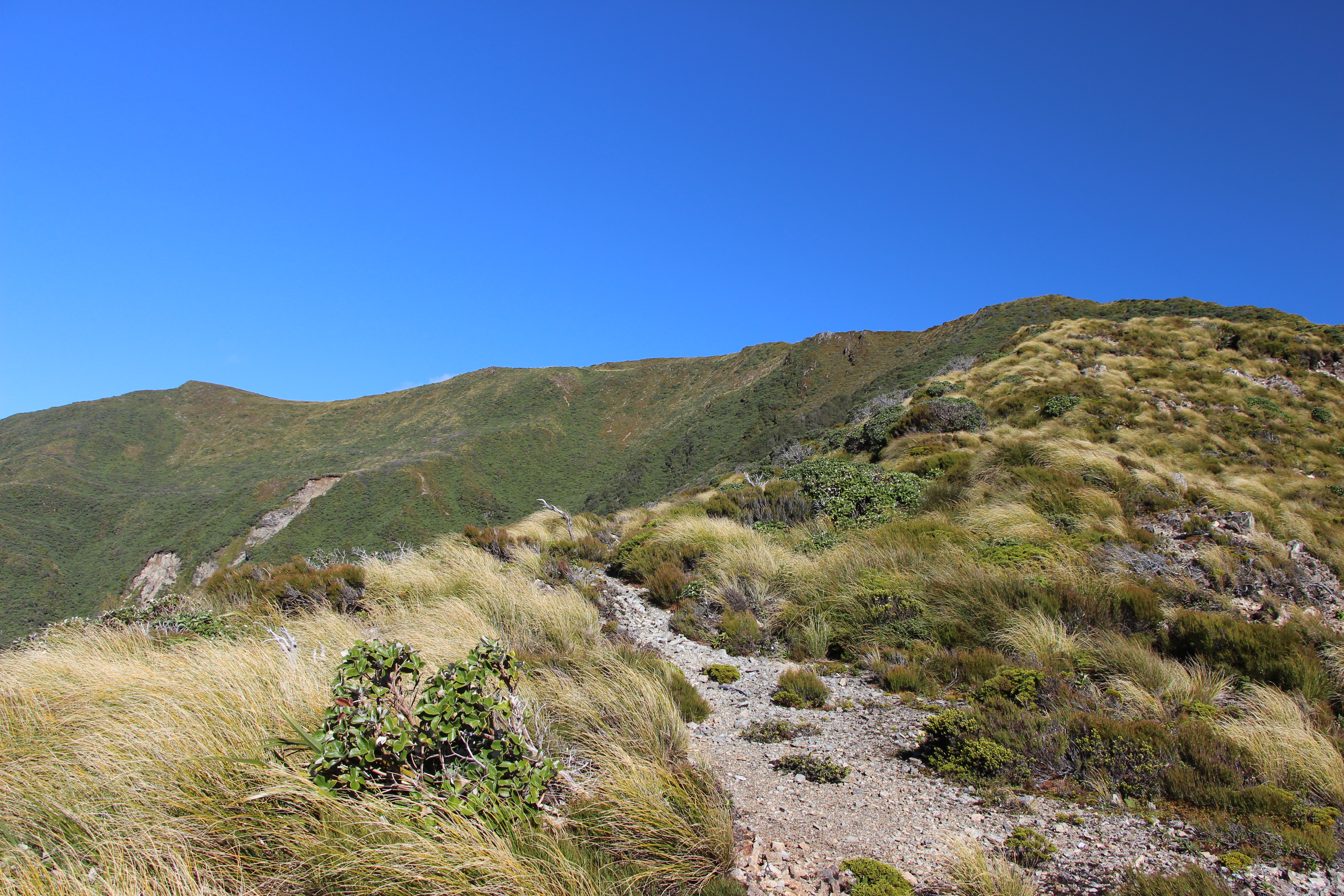
- Ruahine Ranges

- Location within New Zealand
- Location: New Zealand
- Coordinates: 40.0113391°S 176.0415492°E
- Area: 95,268 hectares (235,410 acres)
- Established: 1976
- Governing body: Department of Conservation

Ruahine Forest Park is a protected area in New Zealand's North Island, predominantly in Rangitikei District in Manawatū-Whanganui.

The park is managed by the New Zealand Department of Conservation.

== Geography ==
The park covers 95,268 hectares (235,410 acres) in and around the Ruahine Ranges.

== History ==
The park was established in 1976.
