= Tukituki River =

River in North Island, New Zealand

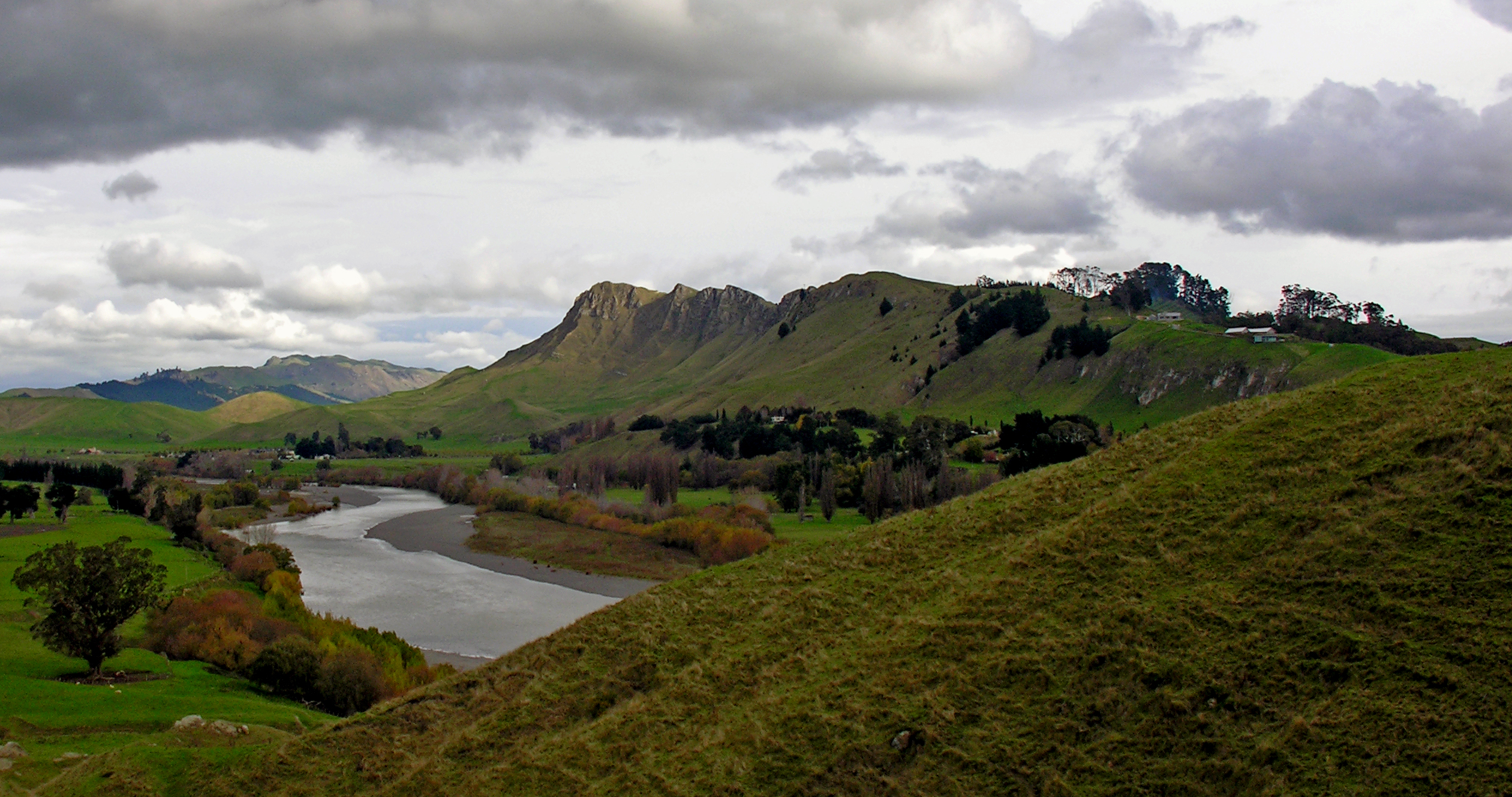
- Tukituki River and Te Mata Peak, May 2006
- Route of the Tukituki River
- Mouth of the Tukituki River Tukituki River (North Island)
- Etymology: Māori meaning "to demolish"
- Native name: Tukituki (Māori)

Location
- Country: New Zealand
- Island: North Island
- Region: Hawke's Bay
- District: Central Hawke's Bay, Hastings

Physical characteristics
- Source: main branch
  - location: Ruahine Ranges, between Otumore and the Pōhangina Saddle
  - coordinates: 39.867°S 176.1326°E
- 2nd source: North Branch
  - location: Ōhuinga, Ruahine Ranges
  - coordinates: 39.86413°S 176.12955°E
- Mouth: Tukituki Estuary
  - location: Haumoana
  - coordinates: 39°35′53″S 176°56′38″E
  - elevation: Sea level
- Length: 117 km (73 mi)

Basin features
- Progression: Tukituki River → Tukituki Estuary → Hawke Bay → Pacific Ocean
- River system: Tukituki River Catchment
- Cities: Waipukurau, Haumoana
- Tributaries
  - left: Ongaonga Stream, Kahahakuri Stream, Waipawa River, Papanui Stream, Tunaatera Stream
  - right: Moorcock Stream, Hylton Burn, Tukipō River, Mangatarata Stream, Mangamahaki Stream, Mangarara Stream, Mākara Stream, Hāwea Stream, Mangangārara Stream
- Waterbodies: Khyber Pass
- Bridges: Tuki-Tuki River Bridge (790, State Highway 50), Ongaonga Waipukurau Road Bridge, Waipukurau Railway Bridge, Waipukurau Bridge (7193, State Highway 2), Tamumu Bridge, Patangata Bridge, Red Bridge, Black Bridge

The Tukituki River is in the Hawke's Bay region of the eastern North Island of New Zealand. It flows from the Ruahine Ranges to the Pacific Ocean at the southern end of Hawke Bay.

The river flows for 117 kilometres (73 mi), east and then northeast, passing through the town of Waipukurau before flowing into Hawke Bay, close to the city of Hastings. There, the Tukituki Valley is separated from Havelock North and Hastings by the craggy range of hills that includes Te Mata Peak.

== Etymology ==
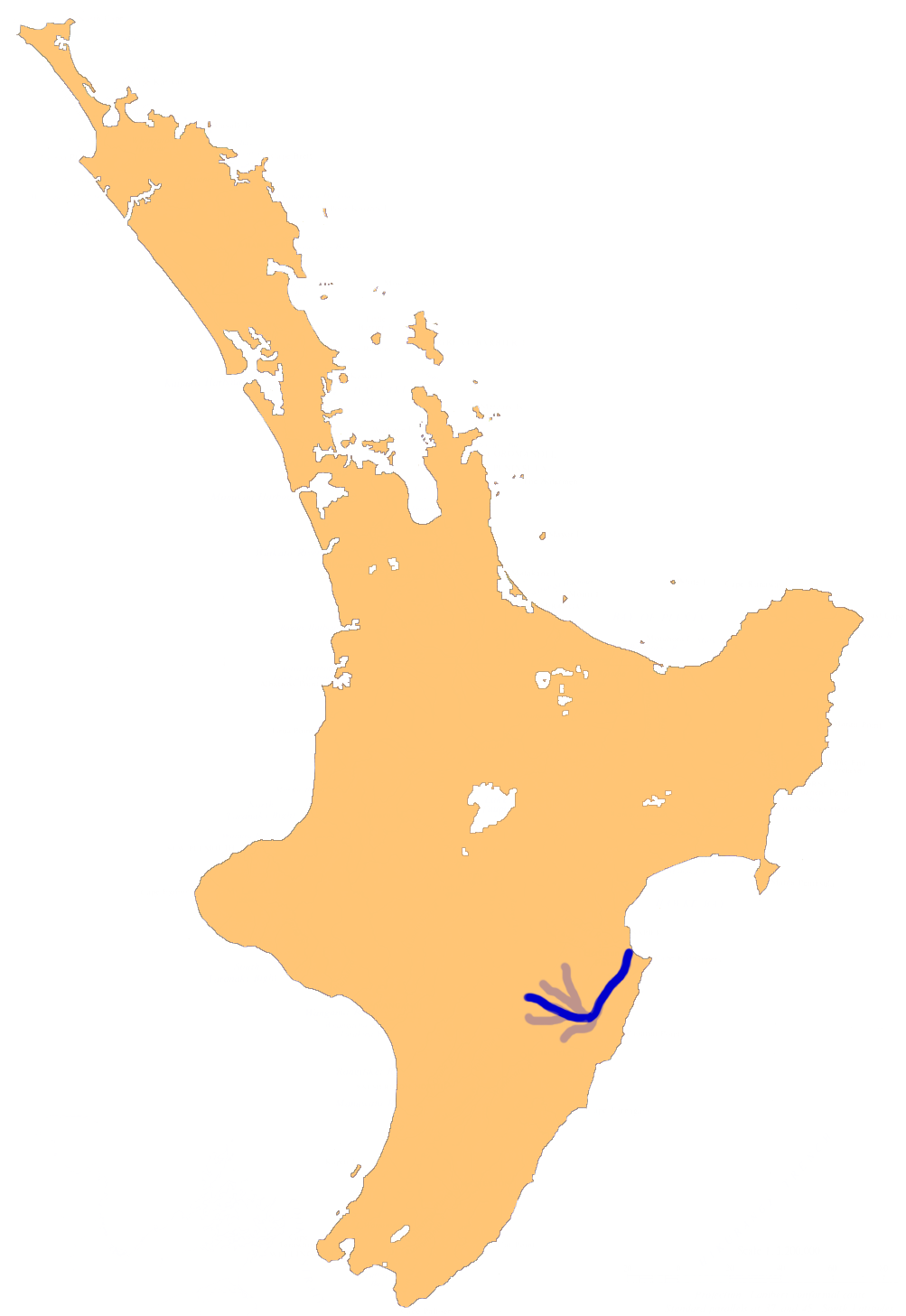
The Tukituki River system

The Māori name Tukituki roughly translates "to demolish", presumably referring to the power of the river in flood. Māori legend has it that there are two taniwha living in lake at the southern end of the river that fought over a young boy after he fell into the lake. The struggle of the two taniwha was thought to split the river into the Waipawa and Tukituki Rivers and thereby draining the lake.

== Geography ==
The lower section of the river flows across the Ruataniwha Plains. The Tukituki Estuary forms at the mouth of the river, which is an important habitat for birds including pied oystercatchers, pohowera, kōtuku, royal spoonbills, black-fronted dotterels and bar-tailed godwits.

== History ==
The river has cultural significance to Ngāti Kahungunu, especially Heretaunga Tamatea. The river is a traditional rohe marker between the lands of different hapū, those who descent from Taraia to the west, and the descendants of Te Aomatarahi to the east. The river was a important transportation route, and is an important traditional food source for Heretaunga Tamatea. Traditional pā and kāinga along the banks of the river include Te Kauhanga pā, Te Korokoro pā, Pātangata pā, Tāmumu pā and Haumoana.
