= Ruahine Range =

Mountain range in New Zealand

Coordinates: 40°00′S 176°06′E

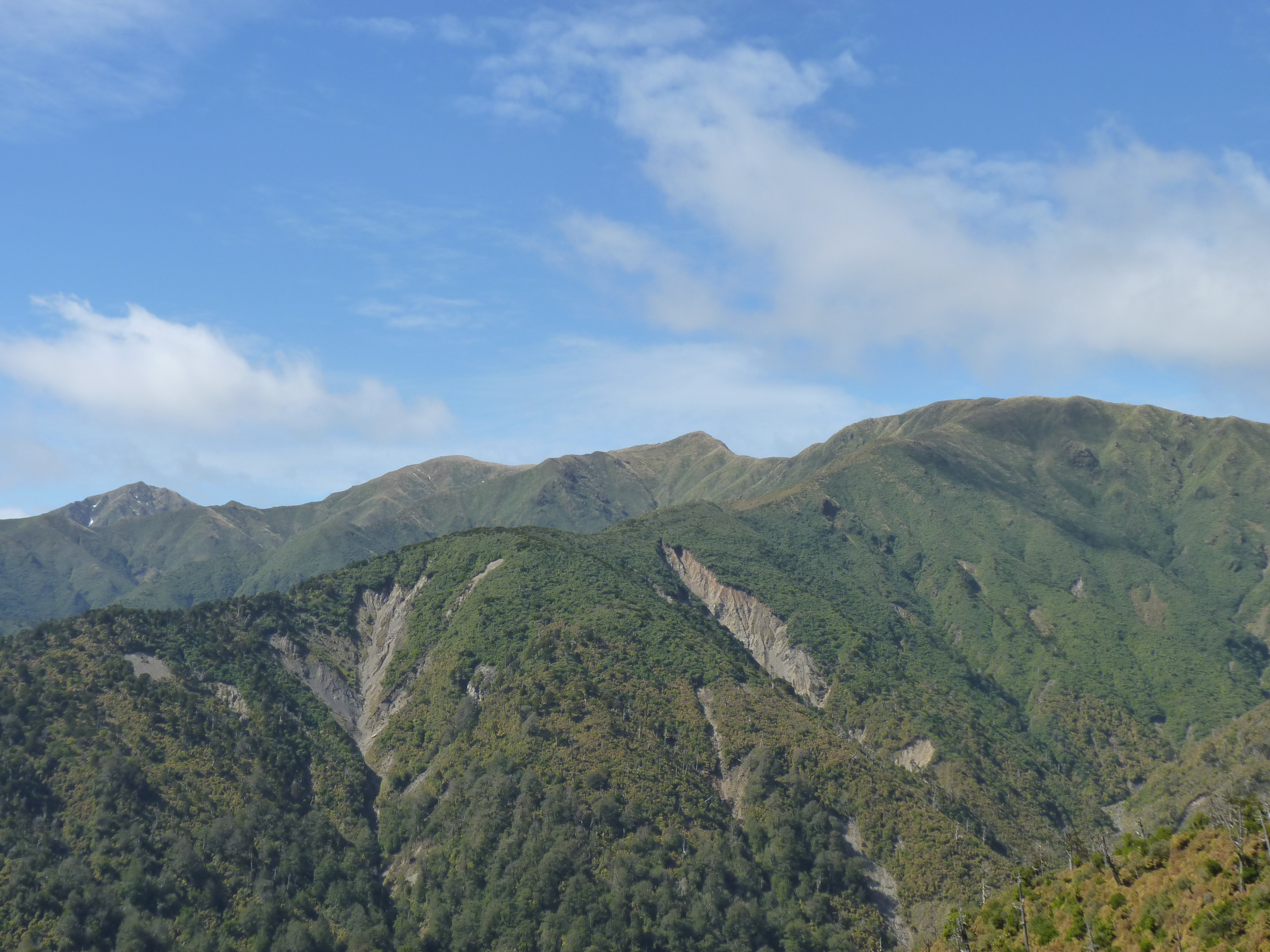
Ruahine Range

The Ruahine Range is the largest of several mountain ranges in the North Island of New Zealand that form a ridge running parallel with the east coast of the island between East Cape and Wellington. The ridge is at its most pronounced from the central North Island down to Wellington, where it comprises the Ruahine, Tararua and Remutaka Ranges.

The Ruahine Range runs northeast–southwest for 110 km (68 mi) from inland Hawke's Bay to near Woodville. The Manawatū Gorge separates the southern end of the Ruahines from the northern end of the Tararua Range.

The highest point in the Ruahines is Mangaweka, situated along the Hikurangi Range. At 1,733 m (5,686 ft), Mangaweka is the second highest non-volcanic mountainous peak in the North Island after Mount Hikurangi (1754 metres/5755 feet) in the Raukumara Range.

The other notable peak is Wharite (920 m (3,020 ft), which marks the southern end-point of the Ruahine Range. Although it is the dominant geographical landmark in the Manawatū and Tararua District, Wharite is perhaps better known in the region for its highly visible television transmission tower. The first transmitter at Wharite was commissioned in 1963, relaying Wellington's WNTV1 channel (now part of TVNZ 1). The current main transmitter was commissioned in 1966.

== Name ==
Ruahine is a Māori name believed to mean "wise woman", with reference to the migrant leader's granddaughter on the Aotea canoe. A local Māori says "Kaua e whakakoria te kuku o Ruahine, kei wera!" (Don't disturb the forest of Ruahine, or it will burst into flames!), referring to the fact that attacking tribes often came down into Hawke's Bay through the passes of the Ruahine Range.
