= Waipunga railway station =

Railway station in New Zealand

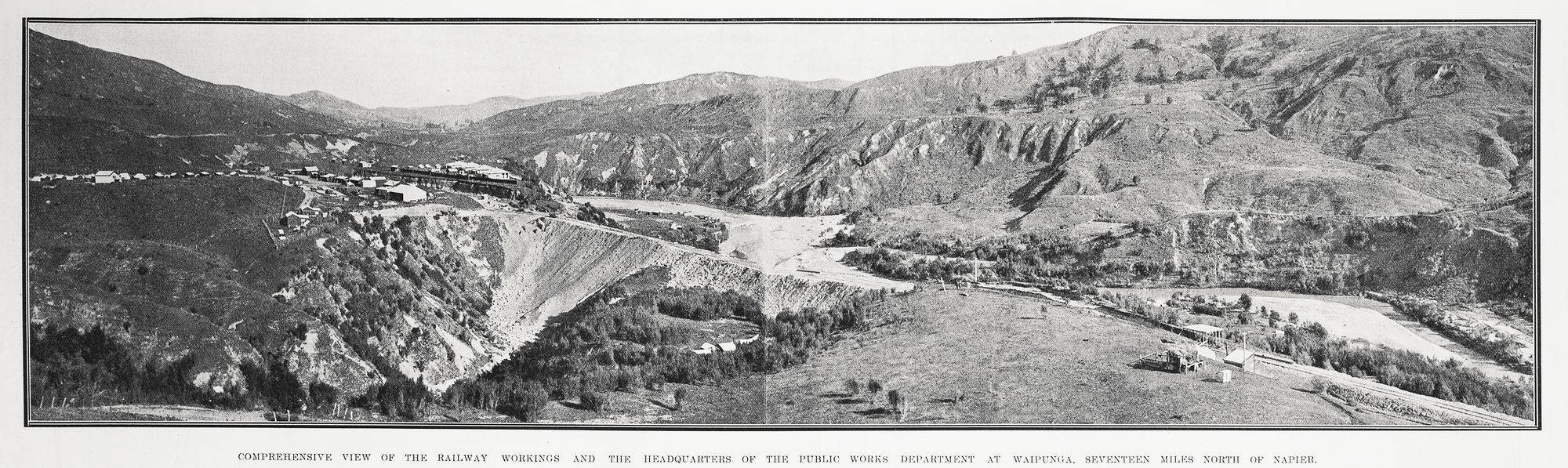
- Waipunga in 1924, showing the large earthworks

General information
- Coordinates: 39.328621°S 176.811519°E
- Elevation: 79 m (259 ft)
- Owner: KiwiRail
- Distance: Palmerston North 205.27 km (127.55 mi)

History
- Opened: 27 October 1925
- Closed: 12 October 1970

Services
Preceding station	Historical railways	Following station
Eskdale; Line open, station closed 7.92 km (4.92 mi) towards PN	Palmerston North–Gisborne Line; KiwiRail	Waikōau; Line open, station closed 12.78 km (7.94 mi) towards Gisborne
Location

Waipunga railway station served a rural part of the steep sided Esk valley, Hawke's Bay, on the Napier-Gisborne section of the Palmerston North-Gisborne line, from 1925 to 1970. A shelter shed has been preserved, alongside a single track.

After 1970 the line continued to be used by freight trains and excursions, but beyond Wairoa, the section to Gisborne was closed by slips in 2012 and mothballed. The Napier-Wairoa section reopened in 2019 following a $6.2 million investment from the Provincial Growth Fund, though, due to COVID-19, log trains were soon suspended, until November 2020. The line was again closed when Cyclone Gabrielle damaged more than 400 sites in February 2023. A decision has not yet (2025) been made on whether to restore or mothball it. The line north of the 191 km post is designated a construction site, requiring permission for access and trains north of Waipunga need a satellite phone. Kiwirail is protecting the line so that it can be reopened.

== History ==
The area was confiscated from Maungaharuru-Tangitū hapū in 1867.

=== Waipunga Estate ===
The 10,000 acres (4,000 ha) Waipunga Estate occupied much of the east bank of the river, north from Eskdale. Hutton Troutbeck bought it in about 1861 and died in 1893. In 1910 it was sold to Sidney Williamson and then to James Bell. It was cleared of some mānuka bush in 1911 and part was sold to Charles Ruddenklau and William Ralph Gardner in 1915. They sold 1,250 acres (510 ha) in 1919, but continued to farm part of it. The 1919 sale plan indicated a railway station to the north, at Kaiwaka, rather than Waipunga.

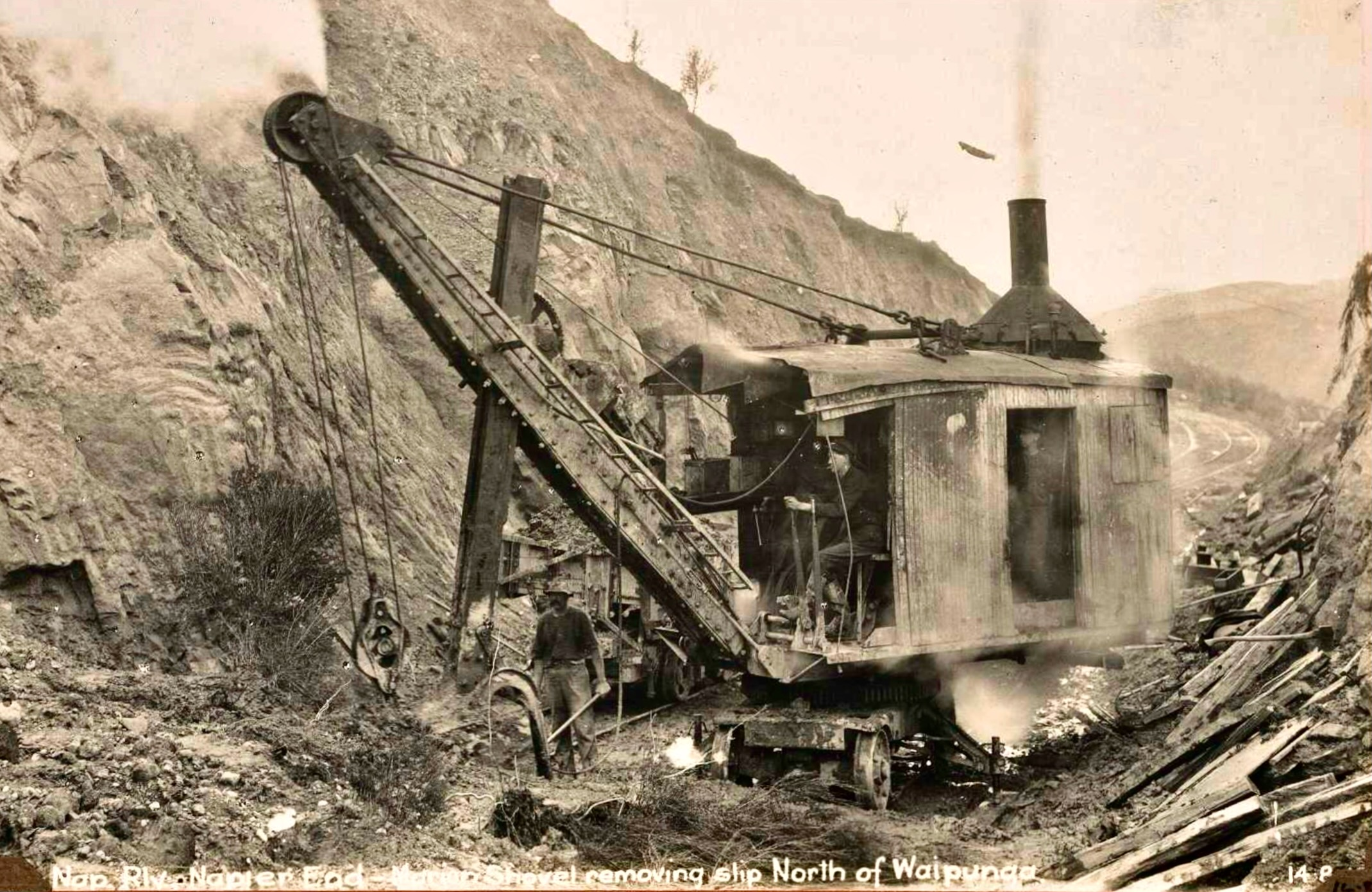
A Marion steam shovel north of Waipunga in 1923

=== 1922–1930 ===
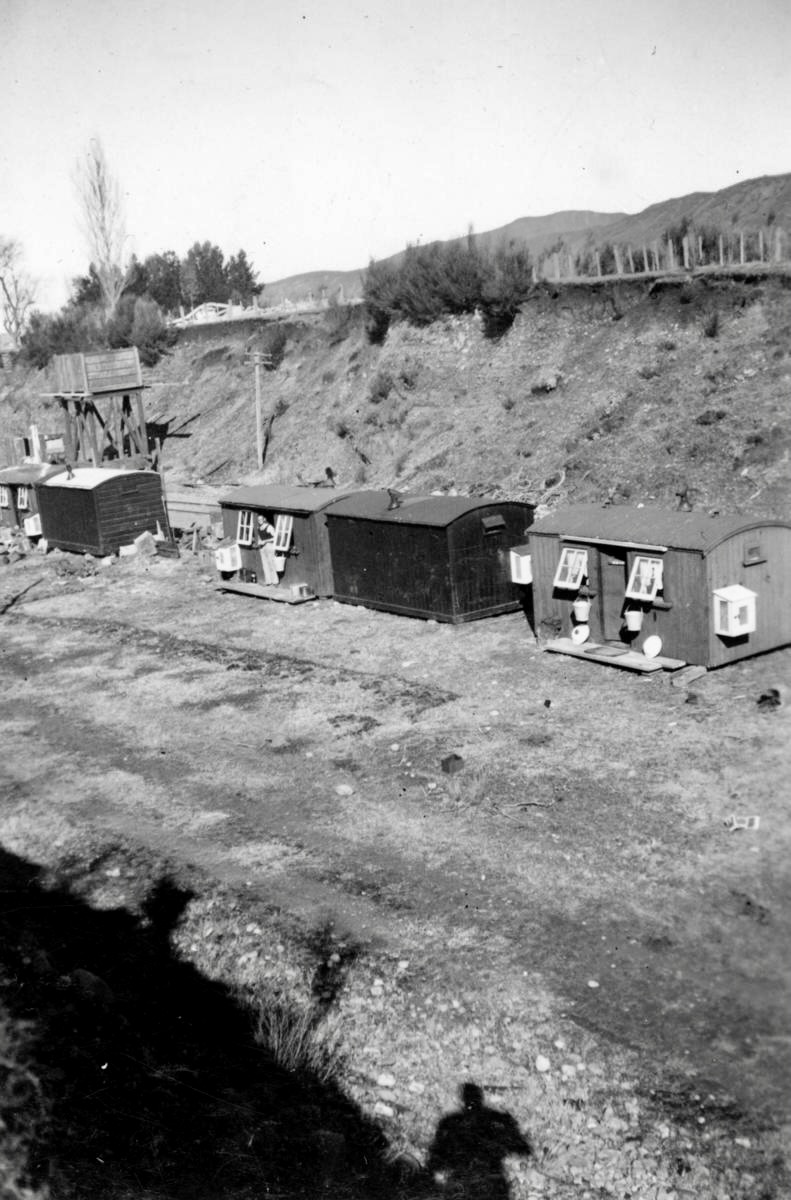
Huts for construction workers in the Waipunga yard cutting, about 1925

A large work camp with a field office, store, carpenter's shop, fitting-shop and 2 platelayers' cottages was built in 1922–23, in and around the Waipunga yard, which was in a cutting 1,200 ft (370 m) long, 90 ft (27 m) wide and an average of 22 ft (6.7 m) deep. The yard is the only level part of the line in the 1 in 60 (or 1 in 50) climb to the summit near Waikoau. Without it another viaduct would have been needed. Waipunga was 16 mi 61 ch (27.0 km) from Napier. In 1924–25 banks were built at 15 mi 20 ch (24.5 km) and 15 mi 40 ch (24.9 km) and rails laid to 18 mi 5 ch (29.1 km), the last being a large cutting at 16 mi (26 km), which had temporary rails linked around it. The bank to the south is 118 ft (36 m) high and to the north 106 ft (32 m). 1.5 km (0.93 mi) of the line through the station was described as heavy formation. Another 700 m (770 yd) to the north, another 1.8 km (1.1 mi) was started with picks and wheelbarrows, but finished by steam shovels. Work on the yard started with 3 steam-shovels, with another from Wairoa in 1923 and 2 more in 1924 By 1923 work had moved beyond the station. In 1924 four concrete railway houses were built and there were 12 married men's houses, 81 huts, and 2 cookhouses.

From 1926 PWD ran trains connecting Waipunga with the Napier-Eskdale trains. At the start of 1926, most of the railway work camp was moved from Waipunga to Waikōau.

In 1928 a shelter shed was erected, and stockyards were moved from Westshore.

=== 1931–1988 ===
==== Earthquake ====
After the 3 February 1931 earthquake, repairs started in March and by June 1931 gangs were working on the line at Waikōau, but were stopped in October 1931, a decision confirmed by an unfavourable Railways Board report. In 1932 repairs were needed to 4 railway cottages and a siding needed relaying.

==== Resumption of work ====
In December 1935 the Minister of Public Works, Bob Semple, announced that the new Labour government would complete the line. Work began on 27 April. By 1937 there was a shelter shed, platform, loading bank, stockyards and a passing loop for 36 wagons. In 1937, 69 ch (1,400 m) north of the station, a reinforced-concrete retaining-wall 120 ft (37 m) long and 25 ft (7.6 m) high was built (replacing a mass concrete wall destroyed by the earthquake) and also a reinforced-concrete spillway.

==== Floods ====
After floods on 24 January and in April 1938 slips and banks were repaired beyond Eskdale, including the movement of 73,220 yd^{3} (55,980 m^{3}) of earth and rebuilding the telephone-line with new poles and closer spacing on a better alignment. Between Eskdale and Putorino there were 19 washouts, the largest being 170 ft (52 m) long and 70 ft (21 m) deep. The line reopened in December 1938. The first railcar ran from Napier to Wairoa and back on 30 June 1937, but a regular service didn't start until 3 July 1939.

==== Closure ====
In 1967 the south end loop was disconnected and Waipunga closed to all traffic on 12 October 1970, except for service wagons and in 1988 to all traffic. By 1989 the platform had gone.

=== Bridges and tunnels ===
The line to the north of Waipunga followed the steep east side of the Esk valley, requiring tunnels through spurs and bridges over side streams. The 7 mi (11 km) stretch was most affected by the 1938 floods.

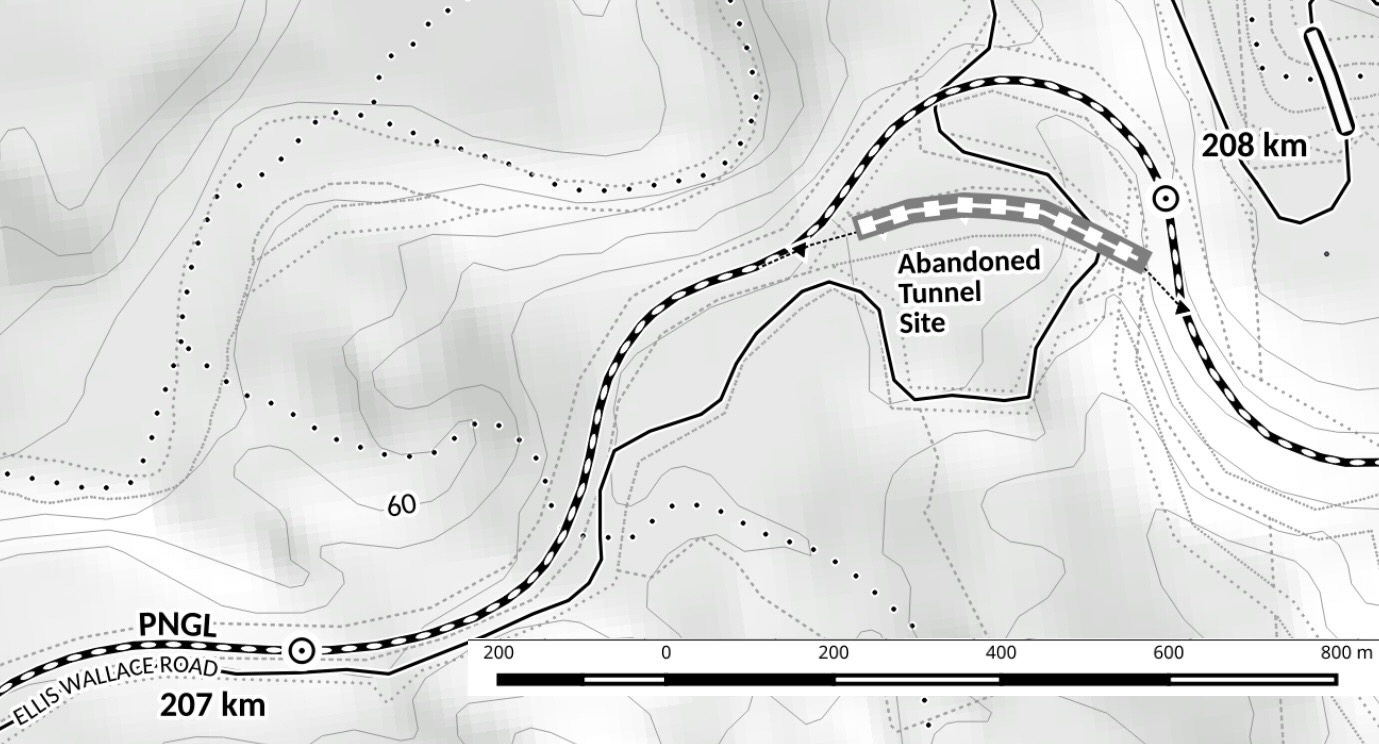
Map of Tunnel 5 and deviation

==== Tunnel 5 ====
The line was built around a planned tunnel, almost 3 km (1.9 mi) north of Waipunga, as it was in unstable country, where slips occurred and at a time when access to build Kaiwaka tunnel was seen as more important.

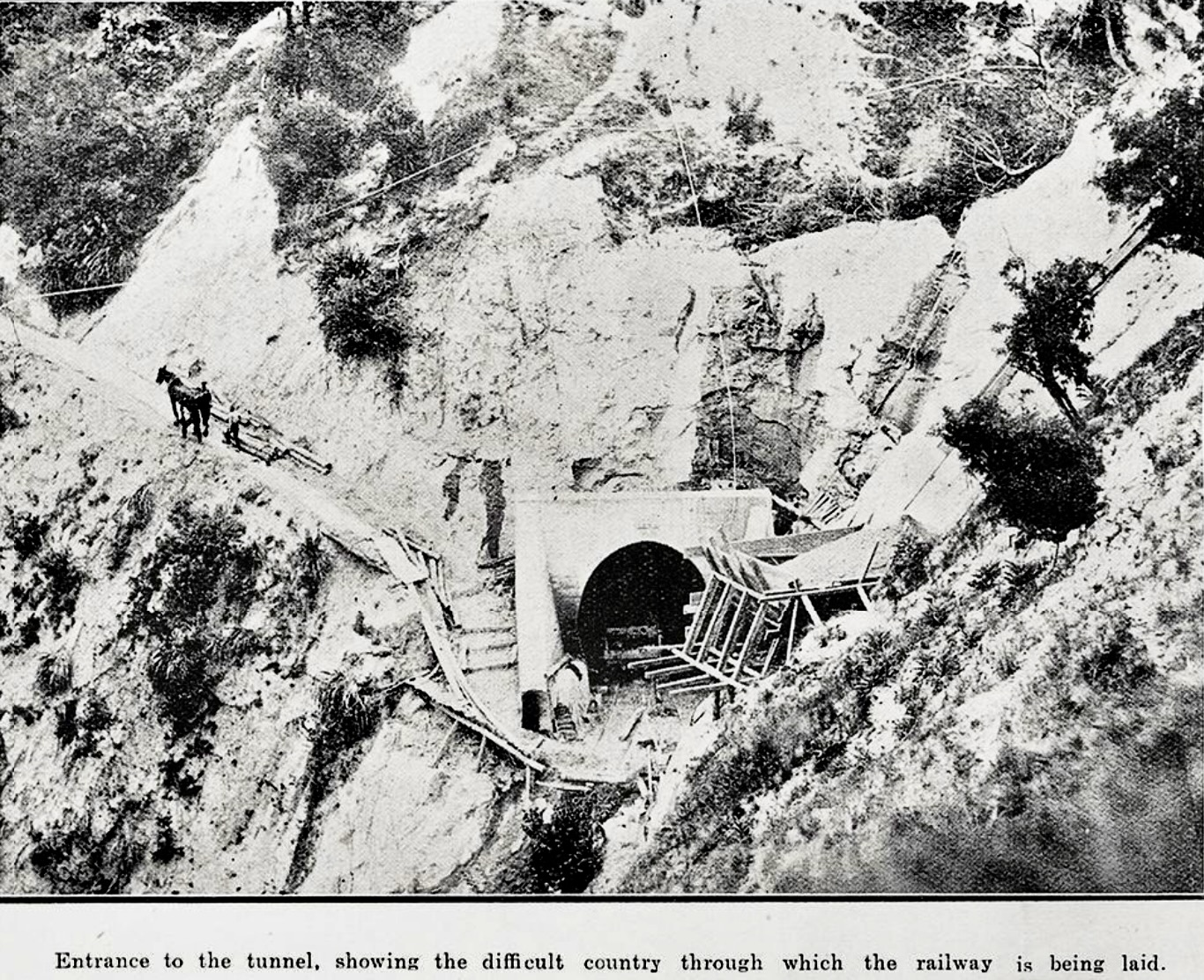
Kaiwaka tunnel in 1923

==== Kaiwaka tunnel 6 ====
About 2.5 mi (4.0 km) north of Waipunga a 216 m (10.7 ch) tunnel was started in 1923 in blue papa rock. The south portal was built in 1923. Two tunnellers died on 29 November 1923, when timber supporting the roof collapsed. Kaiwaka tunnel was finished in August 1924. A 1924 photo shows the staging work at the tunnel portal. A 2017 photo shows the concrete lining still in good condition.

A work camp at Kaiwaka had a YMCA hall built in 1924. There were 8 camps along the line in 1925, with a school about a kilometre from the tunnel at Kaiwaka, which was moved from Wallace's Crossing camp in 1924.

==== Tunnel 7 ====
1.39 km (0.86 mi) further north, the 103 m (5.1 ch) tunnel 7 was dug through shingle, It was being built in 1924, was completed in 1925. and track was laid in 1926.

==== Bridge 223A ====
740 m (810 yd) north of tunnel 7, the 25 April 1938 storm washed out a bank. It was replaced by a temporary bridge and by a 55.9 m (183 ft) long permanent structure in 1941. It was damaged again in Cyclone Gabrielle and underpinning was done in 2024 to stop it collapsing.

==== Tunnel 8 ====
About 1.5 km (0.93 mi) further on, a 109 m (5.4 ch) tunnel was cut through papa. In 1924 approaches to the tunnel were open and a start made with driving. It was completed in 1925.
