= Eskdale railway station =

Railway station in New Zealand

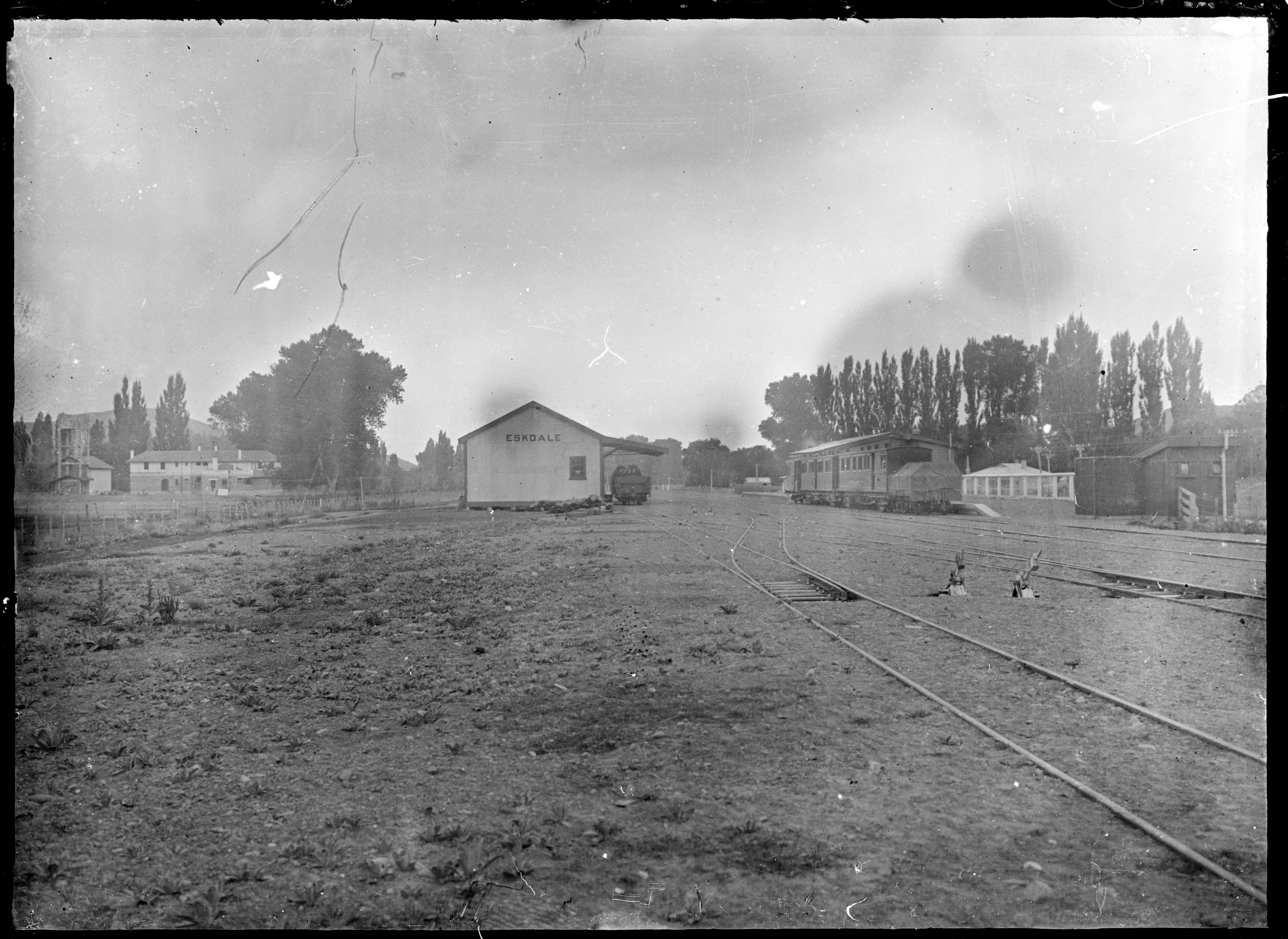
- Eskdale station in 1924

General information
- Coordinates: 39.388813°S 176.82641°E
- Elevation: 17 m (56 ft)
- Owner: KiwiRail
- Distance: Palmerston North 197.35 km (122.63 mi)

History
- Opened: 20 July 1923
- Closed: 20 June 1988

Services
Preceding station	Historical railways	Following station
Riverslea; Line open, station closed 4.09 km (2.54 mi) towards PN	Palmerston North–Gisborne Line; KiwiRail	Waipunga; Line open, station closed 7.92 km (4.92 mi) towards Gisborne
Location

Eskdale railway station served the settlement of Eskdale, New Zealand, on the Napier-Gisborne section of the Palmerston North-Gisborne line, from 1923 to 1988.

After 1988 the line continued to be used by freight trains and excursions, but beyond Wairoa, the section to Gisborne was closed by slips in 2012 and mothballed. The Napier-Wairoa section reopened in 2019 following a $6.2 million investment from the Provincial Growth Fund, though log trains were soon suspended, due to COVID-19, until November 2020. The line was again closed when Cyclone Gabrielle damaged more than 400 sites in February 2023. A decision has not yet (2025) been made on whether to restore or mothball it. The line north of the 191 km post is designated a construction site, requiring permission for access. Kiwirail is protecting the line so that it can be reopened. Almost 7 km (4.3 mi) of track had been removed by 2024, between Mangakopikopiko bridge 219, near the 199 km post, and between SH2 bridge 218A and the 192 km post.

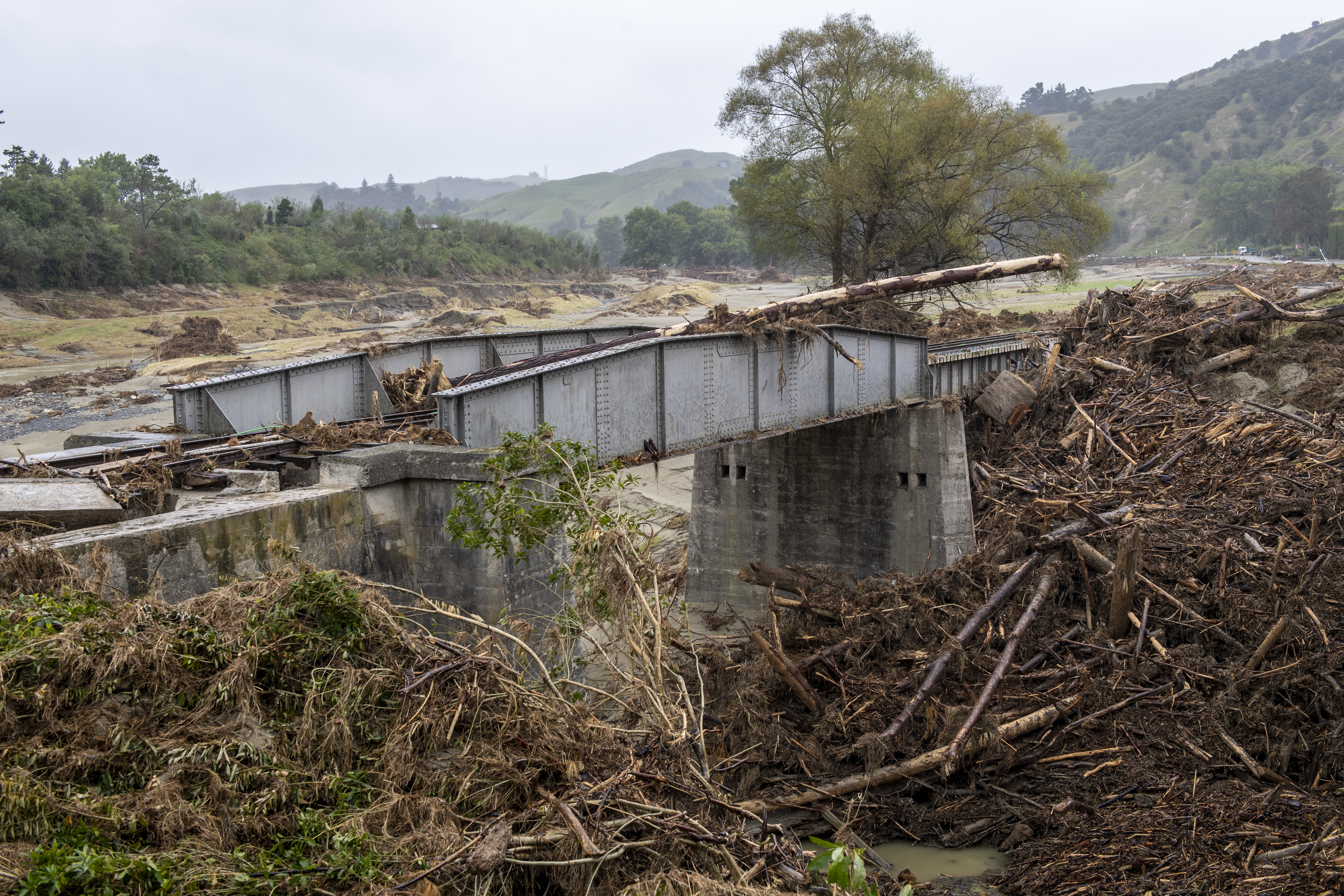
Bridge 219 in 2023

== Eskdale railway station ==
Eskdale station had a shelter shed, platform, 30 feet (9.1 m) x 40 feet (12 m) goods shed, loading bank, latrines, cattle and sheep yards and a passing loop for 53 wagons. Railway houses were built in 1929, 1933, 1936 and 1956. One of the 4 railway houses was destroyed in the 1931 earthquake. In 1936 one was renovated and painted, electric light installed and one was moved from Bay View to Eskdale. In 1967 a temporary siding stored workshop wagons.

=== History ===
==== 1922-1931 ====
Sir Joseph Ward turned the first sod of the 12 miles (19 km) Nelson-Eskdale Section on 29 January 1912, but in October 1912 the new Massey government stopped construction, pending a decision on a bridge or bank across the harbour, which didn't restart until 13 March 1916, though the rest of the section had been formed by the end of 1912. Platelayers' cottages were built in 1921. Platform and loading-banks were finished at Eskdale in 1922. The Government considered stopping work on the Esk bridge in July 1922, but the Prime Minister, Bill Massey, formally opened the Napier to Eskdale line on 15 November 1922 and some goods traffic was carried from mid December 1922, though the first Napier-Eskdale passenger train didn't run until 20 July 1923, when it was hauled by a W^{A} class engine. The Eskdale Section was transferred from PWD to NZR in 1924. A Sunday train was added in 1925, but replaced by a railway bus from February 1930, as it was thought cheaper than running trains. From 1926 PWD ran trains connecting Waipunga with the Napier-Eskdale trains.

==== 1931-1988 ====
After the 3 February 1931 earthquake, repairs started in March and by June 1931 gangs were working on the line from Napier to Bay View, at Eskdale and at Waikoau, but were stopped in October 1931, a decision confirmed by an unfavourable Railways Board report. In December 1935 the Minister of Public Works, Bob Semple, announced that the new Labour government would complete the line. Work began on 27 April and on 2 July 1936 the Napier–Eskdale Section reopened for goods traffic, worked by PWD. The line was taken over by NZR on Monday 23 August 1937, when passenger services resumed. The first railcar ran from Napier to Wairoa and back on 30 June 1937, but a regular service didn't start until 3 July 1939.

In the April 1938 flood the station was covered in 1.6 m (5 ft 3 in) of silt and trucks in the yard were derailed. Slips and banks were repaired beyond Eskdale, including the movement of 73,220 cubic yards of earth and rebuilding the telephone-line with new poles and closer spacing on a better alignment. The line reopened in December 1938. In 1960 the station building was moved to Napier as an amenities building for the Way & Works Depot. In 1969 the daily Gisborne-Wellington railcar took 21 minutes from Napier to Eskdale and 50 minutes from Putorino. In 1949 a railcar was scheduled to take 19 minutes for the 19.09 km (11.86 mi) to Napier. On 31 January 1982 Eskdale closed to all but wagon lots and passengers and from 30 March 1985 it was only open for passengers. By 2019 only a passing loop, shelter and platform remained. The station shelter was left at an angle and track was undermined, or covered in silt during Cyclone Gabrielle in 2023, but the shelter was back in position by April 2024.

== Mangakopikopiko bridge ==
Mangakopikopiko bridge No.219 is just north of kilometre post 199, about 1.7 km (1.1 mi) north of the station. It was a 90 ft (27 m) long bridge, completed in 1923. It had 3 equal rolled steel joist spans and a 60 feet (18 m) steel plate girder span, on reinforced concrete piers and piles. Floods in March 1924 washed away much of the plant, 2 piers and the south abutment. A temporary bridge was built. In 1937 the sliding holes were lengthened and new bolts put in to replace those sheared off by the 1931 earthquake.

North of the bridge, the line climbs at 1 in 60 for half a mile, before dropping at 1 in 110 to the Esk bridge.

== Esk River bridge ==
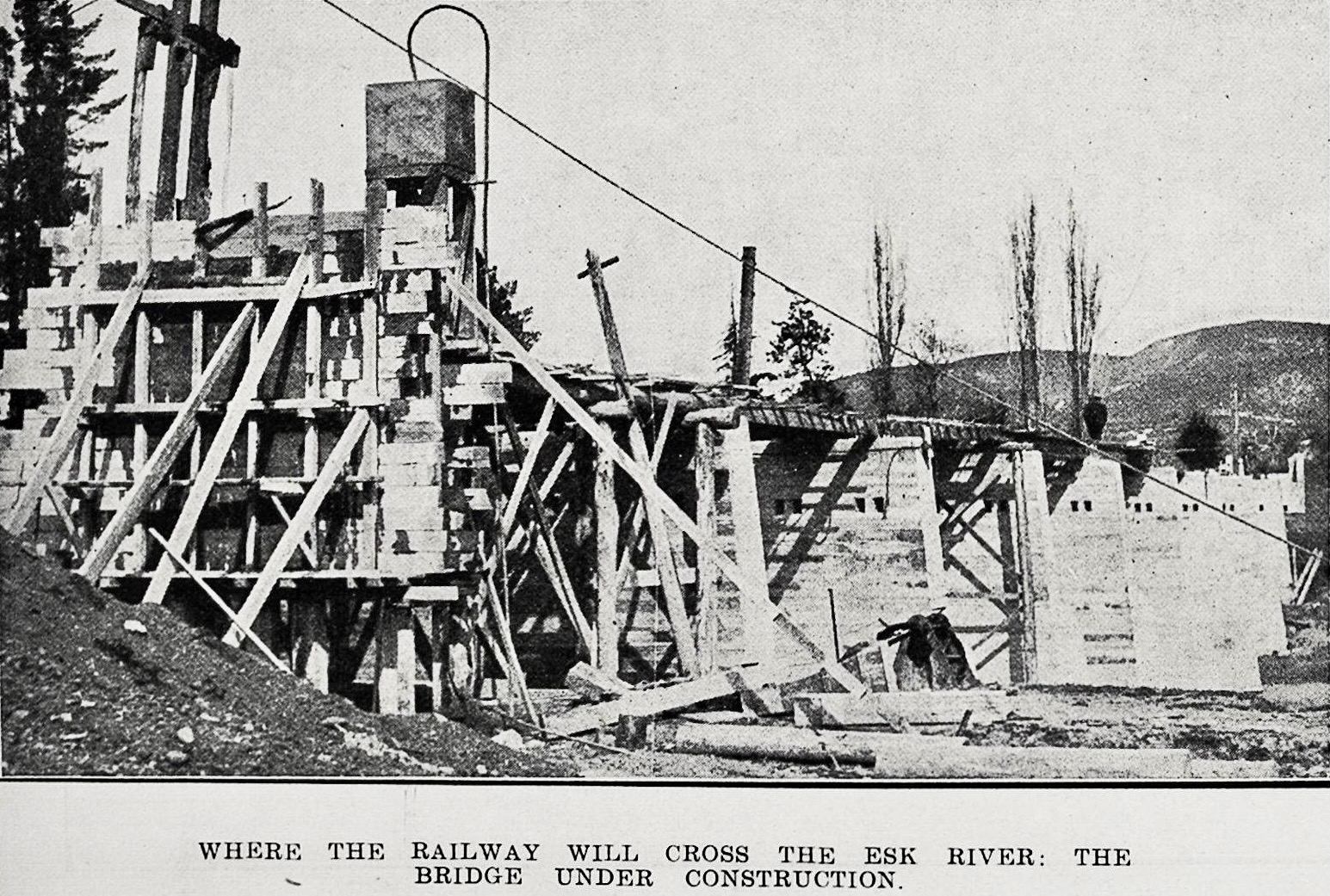
Esk River bridge being built in 1924

Esk River bridge No.222 is just over 3 km (1.9 mi) north of Mangakopikopiko bridge. It is 360 ft (110 m) long and 31 ft (9.4 m) above the Esk River, on concrete piers and was completed in 1924, when the 9 ft (2.7 m) x 40 feet (12 m) steel plate girders were riveted. The bridge site was originally known as Wallace's Crossing.

From the bridge the line climbs the Esk valley to Waikoau summit at 1 in 60 (or 1 in 50).

During construction in 1923, 3 mi 42 ch (5.7 km) north of Eskdale, a construction site was set up with a field office, store, carpenter's shop, fitting-shop and 2 platelayers' cottages. It used 4 steam-shovels in 1923. A temporary school, with 15 pupils, was set up in 1922. It was moved to Kaiwaka in 1924.

The 1931 earthquake broke every bridge pier. In 1937 Esk Bridge was repaired, pier C being entirely rebuilt, using 8 new 14 in (360 mm) octagonal reinforced-concrete piles 22 ft (6.7 m) long, with a heavily reinforced pier on top. The other piers were repaired and strengthened by 2 x 6 in (150 mm) x 3 in (76 mm) channels bolted to each face, bedded in and covered with concrete. All girder-seats were relevelled and reseated, and all sliding ends reslotted and made free to move. The rails were lifted and straightened.

Parts of the bridge were swept away in the April 1938 floods and other spans badly damaged. A temporary bridge was in use in 1939. In 2023 the bridge was covered in debris during the Cyclone Gabrielle floods and about 7 km (4.3 mi) of line washed away, or covered in silt.
