= Westshore railway station =

Railway station in New Zealand

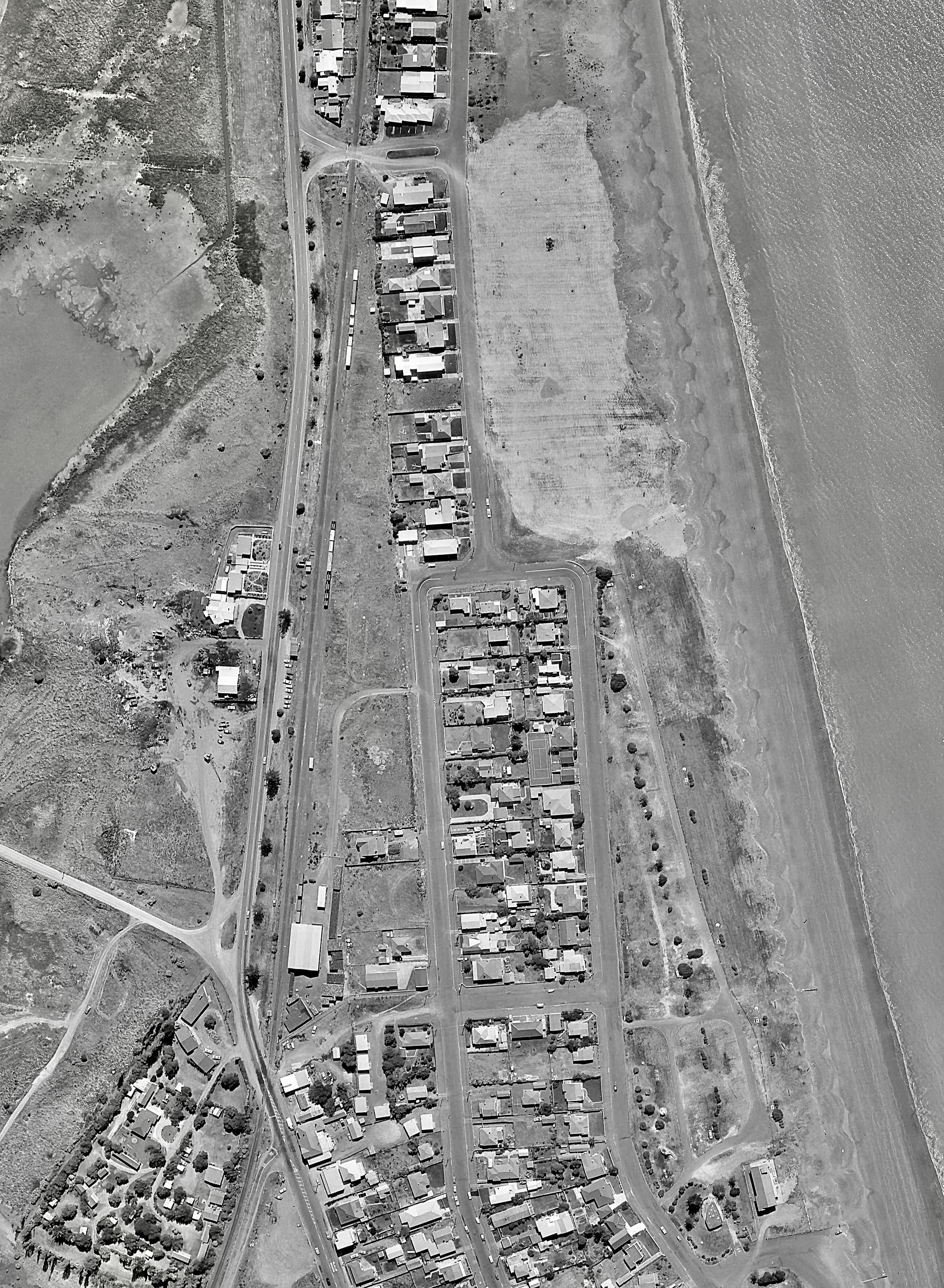
- Westshore railway station in 1972

General information
- Coordinates: 39.4744°S 176.8783°E
- Elevation: 2 m (6 ft 7 in)
- Owner: KiwiRail
- Distance: Palmerston North 183.8 km (114.2 mi)

History
- Opened: 20 July 1923
- Closed: 20 June 1988

Services
Preceding station	Historical railways	Following station
Napier; Line open, station closed 5.54 km (3.44 mi) towards PN	Palmerston North–Gisborne Line; KiwiRail	Bay View; Line open, station closed 5.96 km (3.70 mi) towards Gisborne
Location

The Westshore railway station served the Napier, New Zealand, suburb of Westshore, on the Napier-Gisborne section of the Palmerston North-Gisborne line, from 1923 to 1988.

The line continued to be used by freight trains and excursions, but beyond Wairoa, the section to Gisborne was closed by slips in 2012 and mothballed. The line was again closed when Cyclone Gabrielle damaged more than 400 sites in February 2023. A decision has not yet (2025) been made on whether to restore or mothball it. The Napier-Wairoa section reopened in 2019 following a $6.2 million investment from the Provincial Growth Fund, though log trains were suspended due to COVID-19 trains until November 2020.

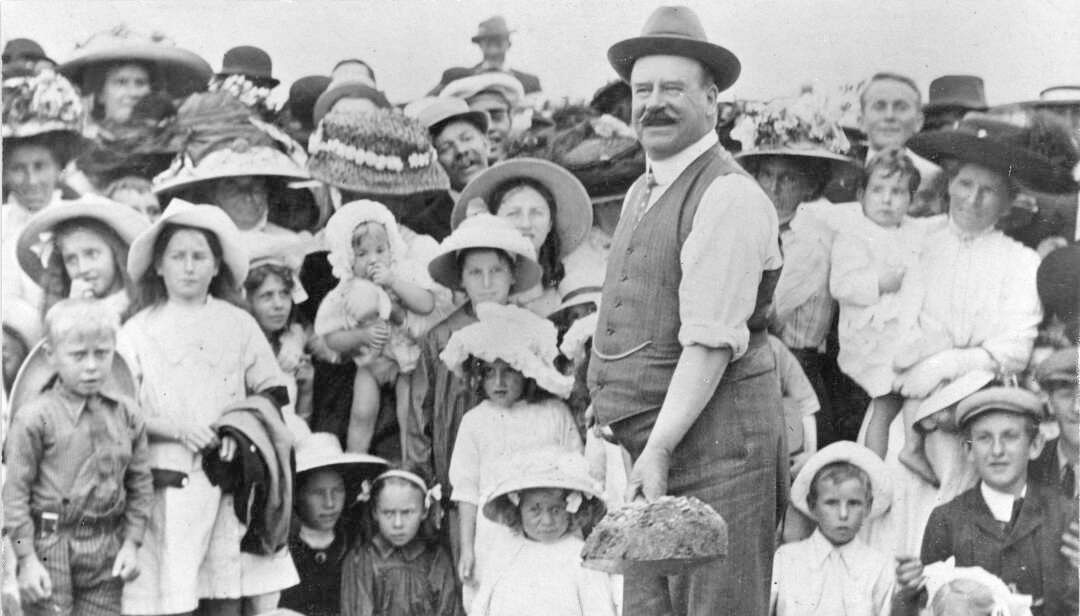
Prime Minister, Sir Joseph George Ward, turning the first sod at Westshore

== Westshore railway station ==
Westshore station had a shelter shed, platform, loading bank, cattle and sheep yards, latrines and a passing loop for 45 wagons, extended to 51 by 1937. Railway houses were built in 1920, 1922, 1932 and 1954. 2 more concrete platelayers' cottages and a concrete Stationmaster's house were built in 1922.

The Prime Minister, Bill Massey, officially opened the line at its junction in Napier on 14 November 1922, but Napier-Eskdale passenger trains only ran from 20 July 1923, taking 10 minutes from Napier, and a Saturday afternoon return train from Napier to Westshore was trialled in November 1923. A Sunday train was added in 1925, but replaced by a railway bus from February 1930, as it was thought cheaper than running trains. In 1924 almost a mile of line between Westshore and Bay View was undermined by the sea. In 1928 the stockyards were moved to Waipunga. In 1945 a railcar hit a truck at a railway crossing, killing 5 men in the truck, but not injuring any passengers. In 1947 Westshore was scheduled to be 6 minutes from Napier by railcar. Buses now take about 25 minutes for the journey.

== Construction ==
At Westshore on 29 January 1912, Sir Joseph Ward turned the first sod. At the other end of the line, Lord Islington turned the first sod near Kings Road station on Saturday 10 February 1912, though a later diversion of the route resulted in the line not passing through Kings Road. Up to 1922 more had been spent on the section south from Gisborne, than that north from Napier. By 2 September 1912 NZR was reporting offers made for properties, but in October 1912 the new Massey government stopped construction, pending a decision on a bridge or bank across the harbour. Therefore, it wasn't until 13 March 1916 that driving of the first bridge pile began. Rails were laid over the bridge to Westshore in July 1922. In 1922 the river gap at 0 mi 32 ch (0.64 km) had a temporary bridge to allow platelaying, almost to Westshore, to proceed. The Harbour Board filled the main line at 0 mi 55 ch (1.1 km). Ballasting of the line from Napier was done in October 1922. On 3 February 1931 the line subsided between Napier and Bay View due to the Hawke's Bay earthquake. Repair work started, in March and by June 1931 gangs were working on the line from Napier to Bay View, at Eskdale and at Waikoau, but stopped in October 1931 a decision confirmed by an unfavourable Railways Board report. In December 1935 the Minister of Public Works, Bob Semple, announced that the new Labour government would complete the line. Work began on 27 April and on 2 July 1936 the Napier–Eskdale Section reopened for goods traffic, worked by PWD. The line was taken over by NZR on Monday 23 August 1937. The first railcar ran from Napier to Wairoa and back on 30 June 1937, but a regular service didn't start until 3 July 1939.

== Westshore bridge ==
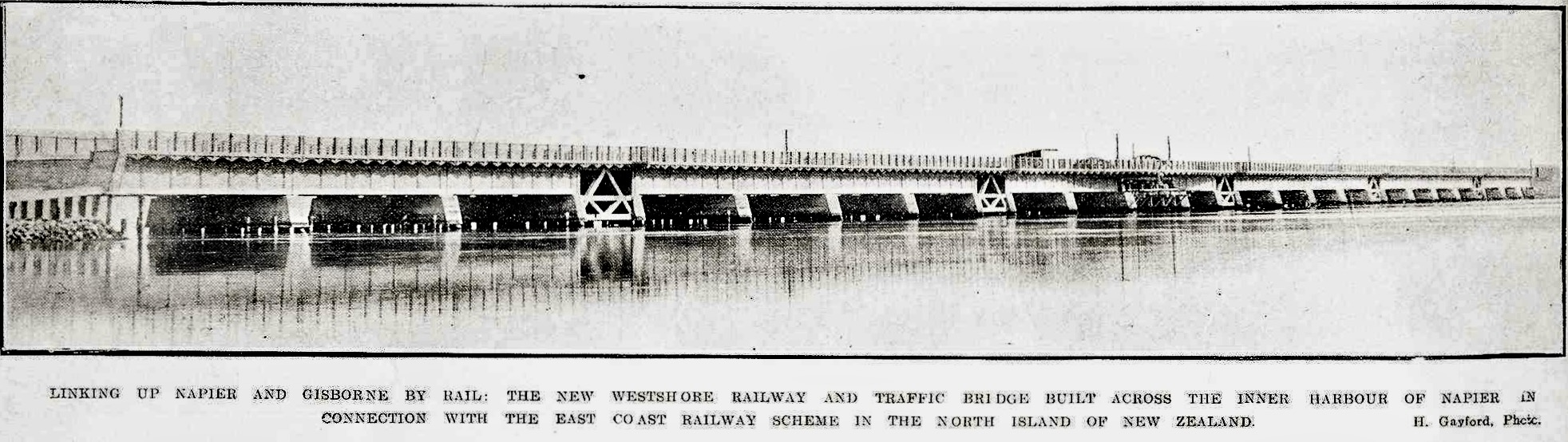
Westshore rail and road bridge in 1918

Between Napier and Westshore, Westshore bridge, No.218, spanned what was then the Tūtaekurī River and now known as Ahuriri Estuary, or the Main Outfall Channel. It was started in 1914 for road and rail traffic, had a navigable bowstring arch of 57 feet (17 m), 10 pairs of 50 feet (15 m) reinforced concrete spans, with 25 feet (7.6 m) spans between the pairs, with expansion joints and strong longitudinal bracing. It was a joint project of PWD, Napier Harbour Board and Hawkes Bay County Council. PWD built it for £44,708 18s. and the Harbour Board built the embankments leading to the bridge, completing the bank from Westshore in 1916. It was 38 feet (12 m) wide, with a 6 feet (1.8 m) footpath, 18 feet (5.5 m) road and 14 feet (4.3 m) railway. It was 1,232 feet (376 m) long and the last concrete was poured in a ceremony on 21 January 1918. The bridge was completed in March 1918, though the bank on the Napier side was still to be finished. Napier Harbour Board completed the approaches to Westshore Bridge in 1923.

The 3 February 1931 earthquake diverted the river, pushed the southern span off its pier at the expansion joint, cracked the piers to the north and raised the bridge by 5 ft 10 in (1.78 m). The road was soon repaired, but, as above, not the railway. The former road on the bridge is now used by the Ahuriri Estuary Walk and the Water Ride, with about 50,000 users a year.
