= Napier railway station, New Zealand =

Railway station in New Zealand

Napier
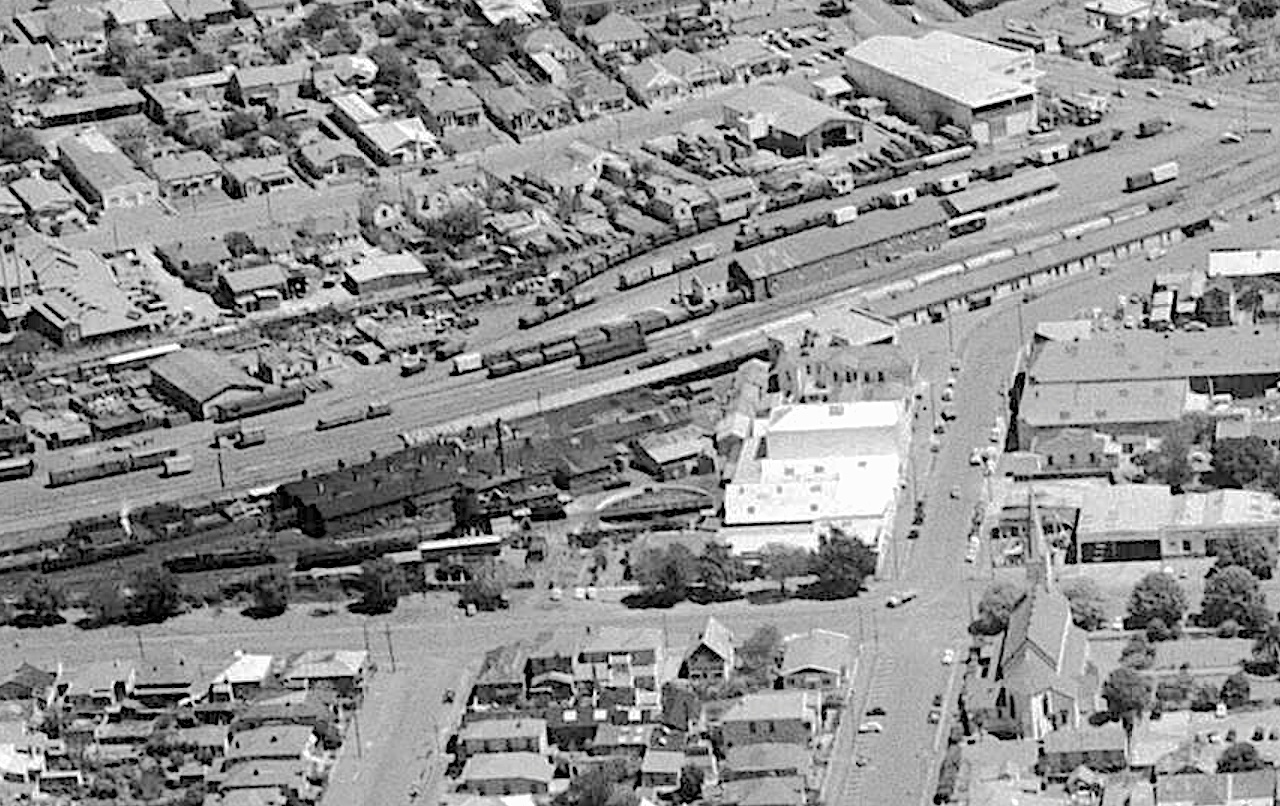
- Napier railway station 1959

General information
- Location: Station Road then Munroe Street, Napier; New Zealand
- Coordinates: 39.4971°S 176.9156°E
- Elevation: 3 m (9.8 ft)
- Owner: New Zealand Railways Department
- Line: Palmerston North–Gisborne
- Distance: Palmerston North 178.26 km (110.77 mi)

History
- Opened: 12 October 1874
- Closed: 7 October 2001 (passengers)
- Rebuilt: 1989-1991

Services
Preceding station	Historical railways	Following station
Awatoto; Line open, station closed 6.12 km (3.80 mi) towards PN	Palmerston North–Gisborne Line; KiwiRail	Westshore; Line open, station closed 5.54 km (3.44 mi) towards Gisborne
Location

The Napier railway station in Napier, New Zealand was the main railway station in Napier and an intermediate stop on the Palmerston North–Gisborne Line.

The original Napier station building was on the corner of Station Street and Millar Street, close to the centre of Napier. The facilities on the site increased to include the passenger station plus a goods yard, locomotive depot, workshop, and a way and works (maintenance) depot. The line was on a difficult to work curve and the site was limited by level crossings at each end, leaving no room for expansion. Since 1990, the passenger station has been 820 m (900 yd) further south, at 85 Munroe Street, and is still used by occasional passenger trains.

Napier was the terminus for both Gisborne and Wellington goods trains, though some passenger trains ran straight through, such as the Endeavour express. This section north was mothballed in 2012, reopened to Wairoa in 2019, but was closed again by Cyclone Gabrielle in 2023. Increased costs at the Wairoa Log Yard resulted in rail not being competitive.

== History ==
=== Construction ===
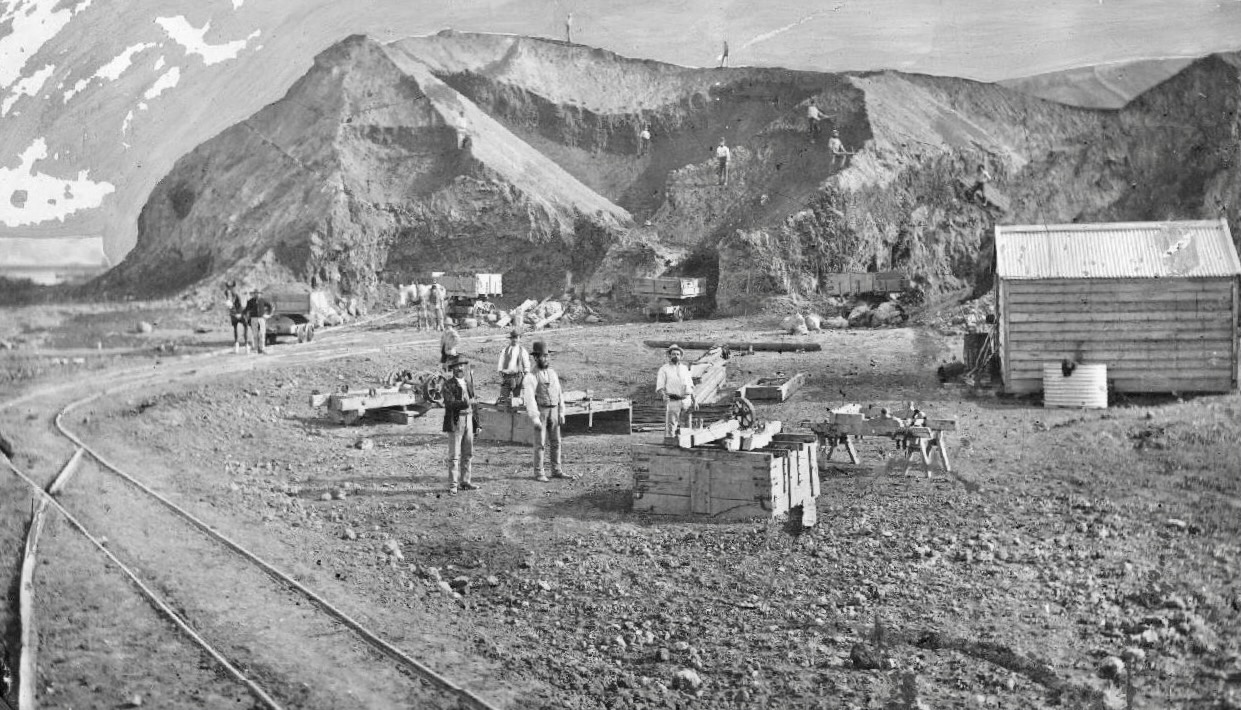
To reach Spit, Pukemokimoki Hill (a native reserve), was removed in 1872

Construction of the line north to the port at Spit began on 1 January 1872, a major work being to dig away Pukemokimoki hill, which had been a headland and Ngāti Pārau pā site. The first passenger train was organised by the contractors, John Brogden and Sons, on Tuesday 30 June 1874 from Napier to Waitangi. On Monday 12 October 1874, the station and the first section of the line south from Napier to Pakipaki, the 11 mi 64 ch (19.0 km) to Hastings, was opened by Brogdens with an excursion train, taking 40 minutes, and a picnic, but there was no other ceremony. The line through the Manawatū Gorge to Palmerston North and hence to Wellington was opened on 9 March 1891, linking the Napier section to other railways. On Wednesday 25, or Thursday, 26 November 1874, the 2 mi 16 ch (3.5 km) line to Spit opened.

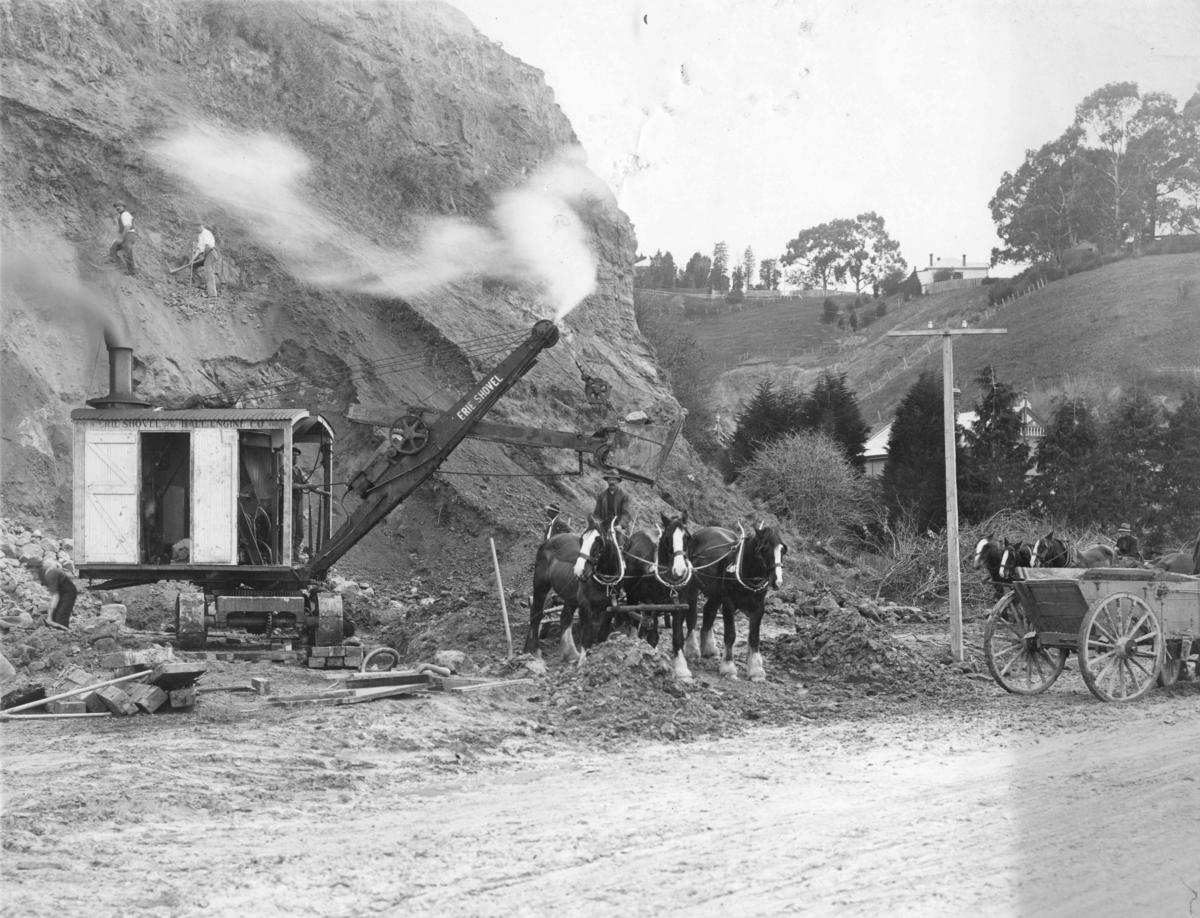
Railway construction with an Erie Steam Shovel at Pandora Point about 1920

The next extension from Napier was long delayed. Construction commenced on a line north of Napier in 1912, first reaching Eskdale in 1922 after a series of delays and finally reaching Gisborne on 3 August 1942; passenger services commenced on 7 September. At Westshore, on 29 January 1912, Sir Joseph Ward turned the first sod. By 2 September 1912, NZR was reporting offers made for properties, but next month the new Massey government stopped construction, pending a decision on a bridge or bank across the harbour. Therefore, it wasn't until 13 March 1916 that driving of the first bridge pile began. The last pile was driven on 26 June 1917. Work was delayed by shortages during World War I, so that rails weren't laid over the bridge to Westshore until July 1922. In 1922, the river gap at 0 mi 32 ch (0.64 km) had a temporary bridge to allow platelaying to Westshore to proceed. The Harbour Board filled the main line at 0 mi 55 ch (1.1 km). Ballasting of the line from Napier was done in October 1922, with a new siding at Faraday Street, about 30 chains (600 m) north of Napier station, used to supply materials. On 3 February 1931, the line subsided between Napier and Bay View due to the Hawke's Bay earthquake. Repair work started in March and by June 1931, gangs were working on the line, but stopped in October 1931, a decision confirmed by an unfavourable Railways Board report. In December 1935, the Minister of Public Works, Bob Semple, announced that the new Labour government would complete the line. Work began on 27 April and on 2 July 1936, the Napier–Eskdale Section reopened for goods traffic, worked by PWD. The line was taken over by NZR on Monday 23 August 1937. The first railcar ran from Napier to Wairoa and back on 30 June 1937, but a regular service didn't start until 3 July 1939. In 1937, work at Pandora Point removed a tight 5 chains (110 yd) curve and use of explosives there in 1947 created space for marshalling yards.

=== 1874 station ===
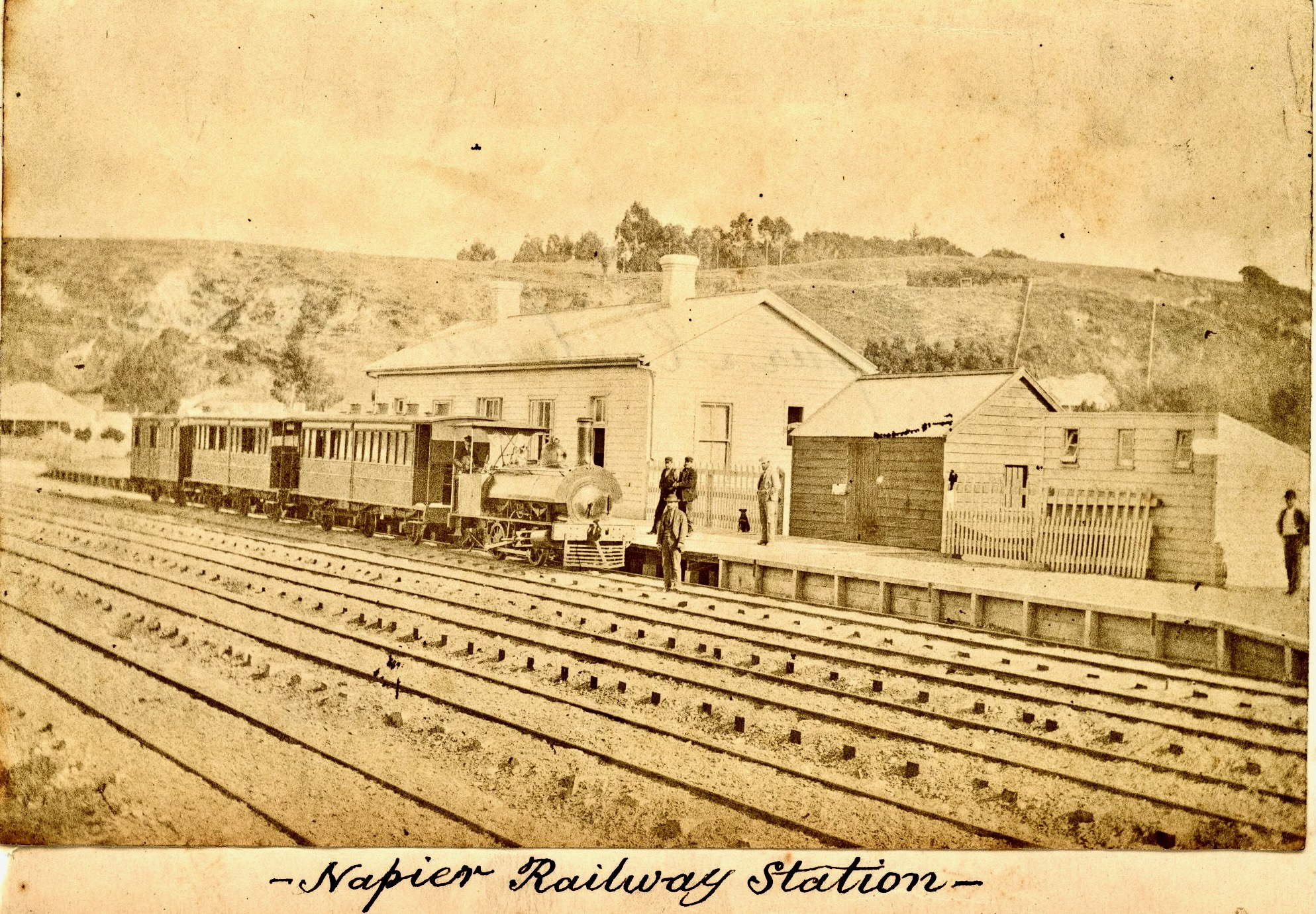
C class locomotive in 1874

Napier station building was extended several times as traffic grew, to become a 1st class station. It was on a spit, with the Tūtaekurī River estuary to its east, a site later occupied by railway offices. Tenders for it closed on 21 January 1874. On 4 September 1875, Justin McSweeney completed a £500 contract for a store at Napier station. A 1st class stationmaster's house was built in 1878. In 1879, £1,426 were requested to reclaim land from the estuary to expand the station and workshops. In 1882, an estimate of the cost of a verandah was made. Additions to the station by Lucas & Humphrey cost £588 in 1884. In 1893, the platform front was rebuilt in concrete. A bookstall was mentioned in 1894. By the 1880s, developments were making the station the centre of town.

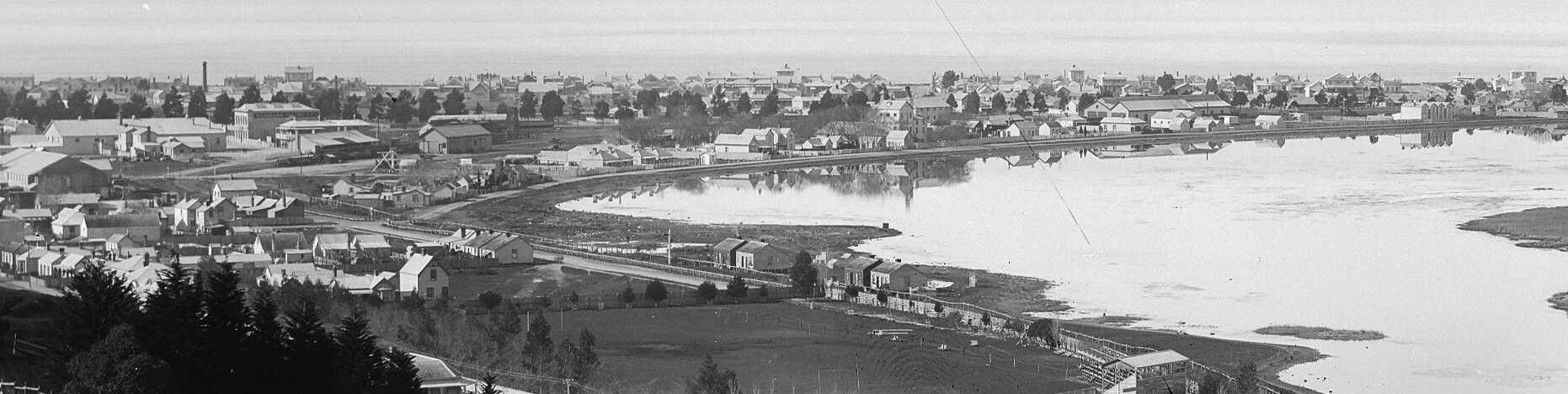
Tūtaekurī River and railway in late 1880s. The station is largely hidden by the goods shed

By 1896, it was a 2nd class station, with platform, cart approach, 100 ft (30 m) x 30 ft (9.1 m) goods shed, crane, water, coal, weighbridge, wagon turntable, engine shed, fixed signals, stationmaster's house (rebuilt in 1900) and urinals. A loading bank and cattle yards were added in 1897 and sheep yards in 1898. In 1906, the station was described as an old wooden building on piles, with an asphalt platform, a stationmaster's office, chief clerk's room, parcel room, booking room, public office, luggage room and a ladies waiting room, with a goods shed, office, engine sheds and workshops, having trains a day, including the Express. In November 1926, NZR bought the Napier & Hastings Bus Company, and a bus office was opened on Marine Parade. Refreshment rooms opened on 1 July 1939, on opening of the line to Wairoa. On 29 July 1948, the telegraph room was destroyed by fire, probably originating in a chimney.

In the 1880s, houses were provided for senior staff, such as the Locomotive Foreman, and railway houses were added in 1894 (1), 1898 (1), 1926 (3), 1927 (4), 1930 (1), 1933 (1), 1934 (1), 1936 (2), 1940 (1), 1946 (1), 1947 (1), 1948 (2), 1950 (1), 1951 (1), 1955 (1) and 1956 (3).

In 1882, an artesian well was sunk for £160. From about 1883, two saltwater wells provided water for firefighting. In 1929, the water supply was made independent of Council's supply, and in 1930 four 400-gallon tanks were moved from Hastings.

At the south end of the platform, a departure bay was built and later another at the north, for the Gisborne railcars, though the canopy only protected the main platform. On the seaward side, the engine sheds had a turntable, coal bunkers, (also fuel oil from October 1947) and could do light running maintenance. Across the tracks was the goods shed. In the 1960s, the original station was gradually demolished and a new complex was built on the same site.

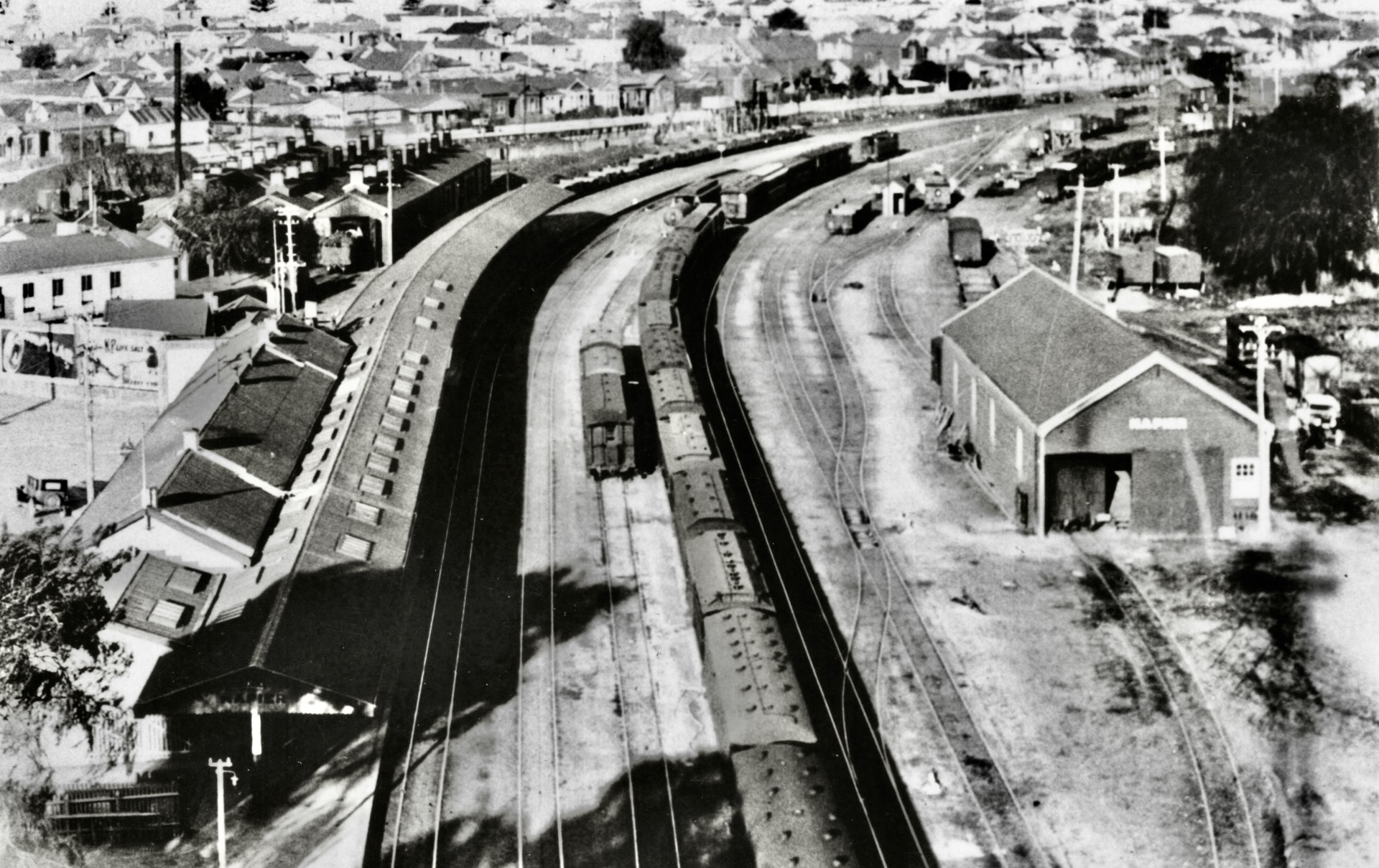
station around 1920s

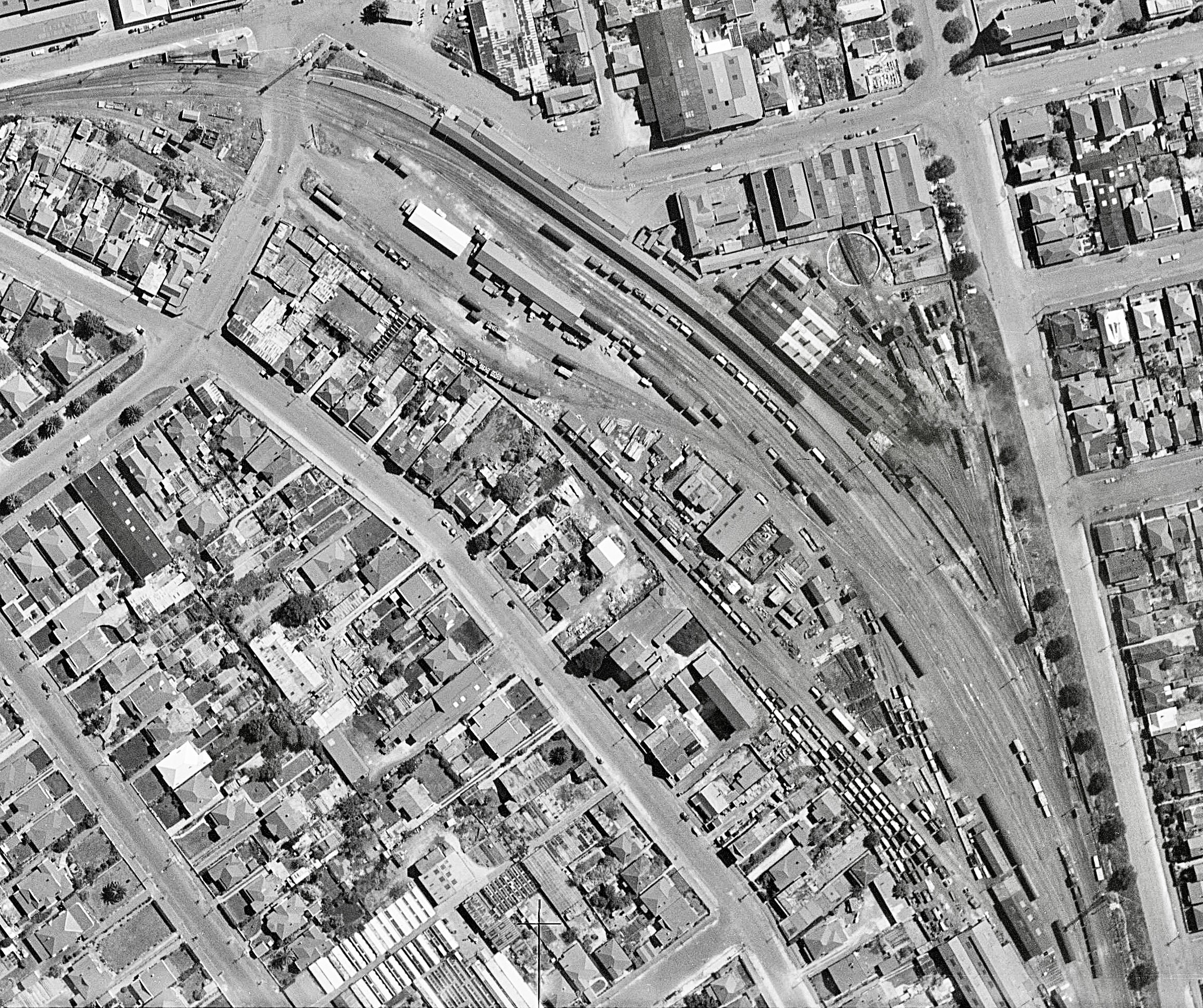
station in 1951

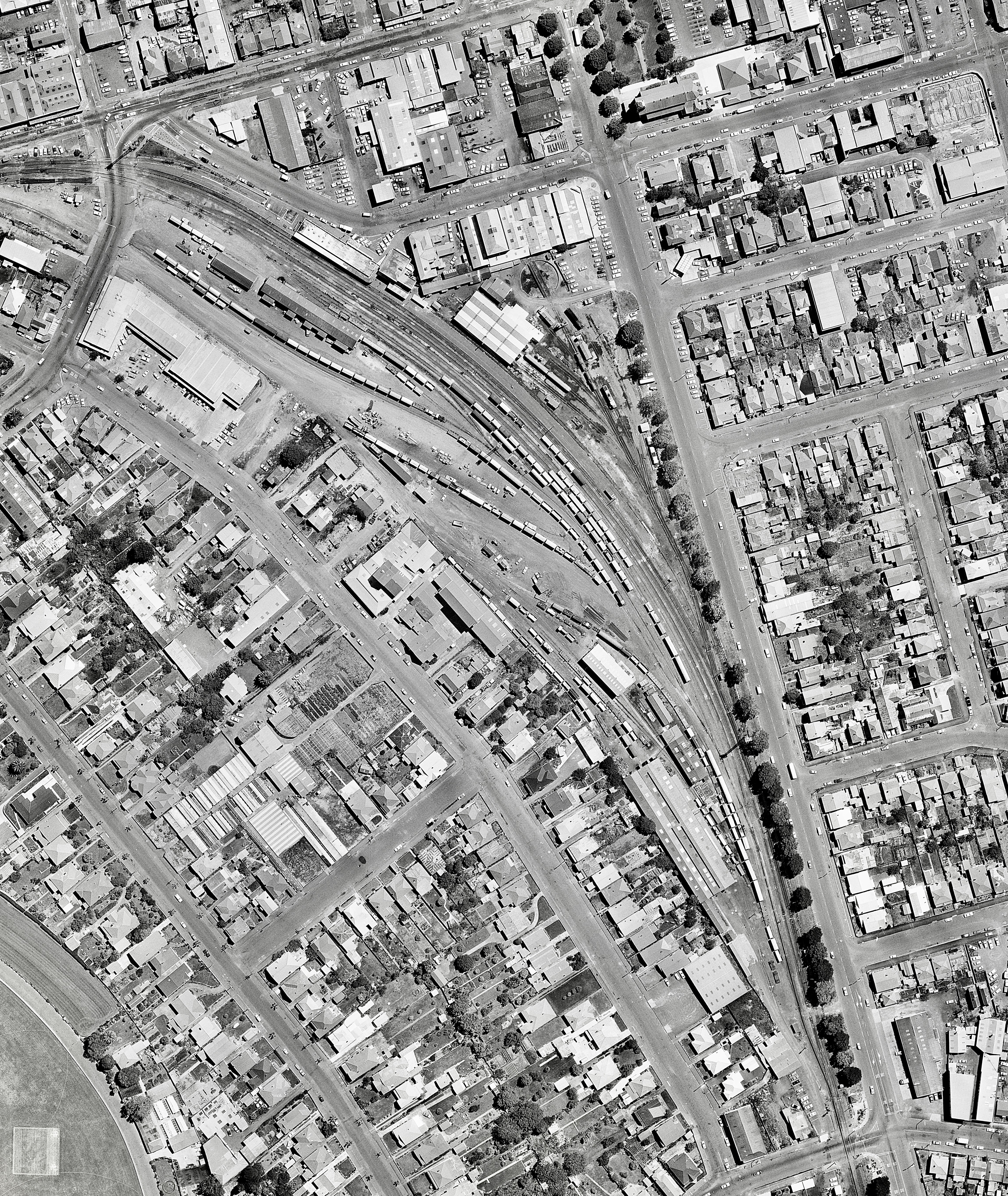
station in 1973

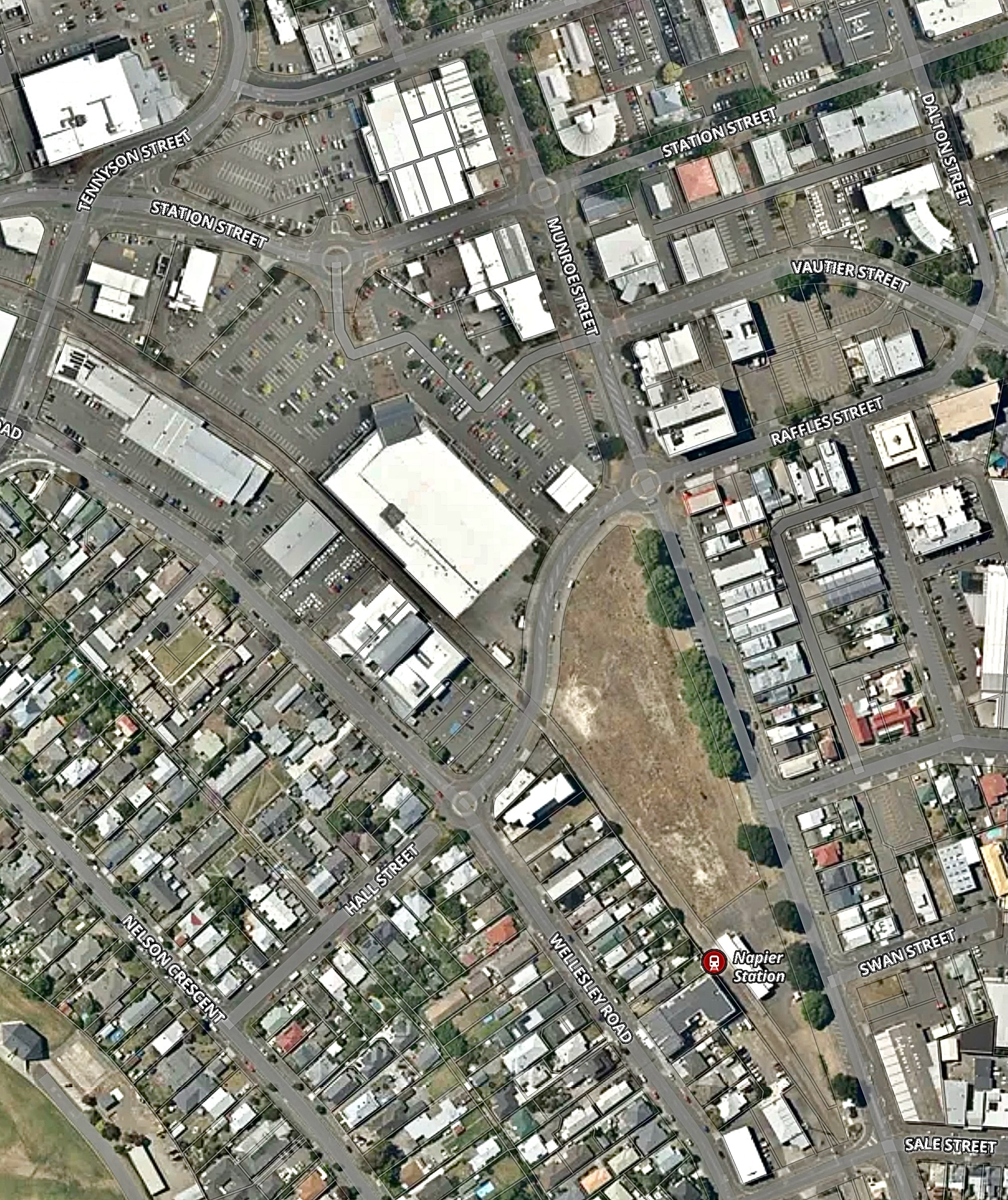
station in 2025

=== 1961 station ===
An office block was built in 1956, and a new 155 ft (47 m) x 30 ft (9.1 m) station building opened beside it on 4 September 1961. In 1960, Eskdale station building was moved to be an amenities building for the Way & Works Depot, and in 1972 it was moved from Napier to Pandora.

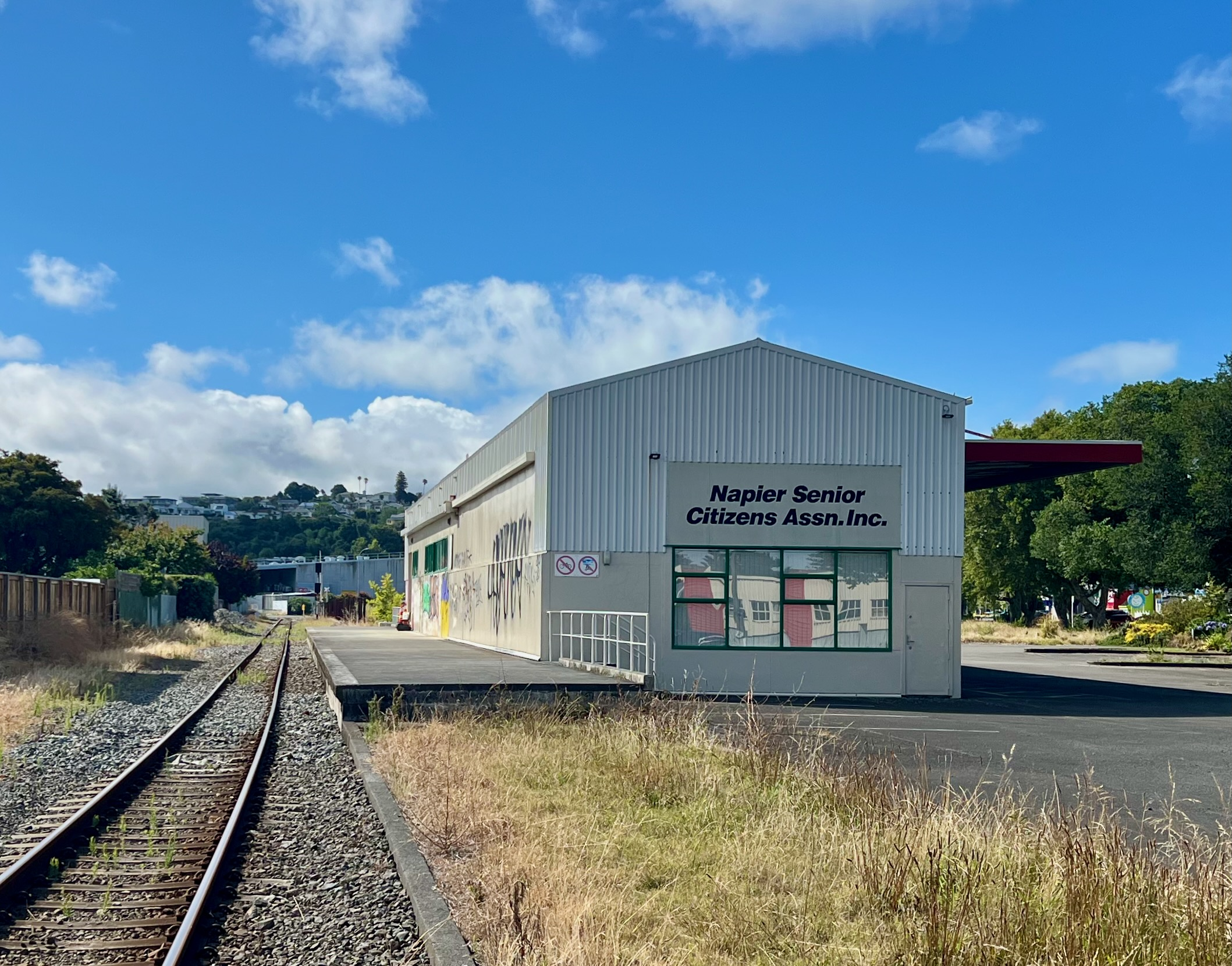
1990 station and platform in 2025

=== 1990 station ===
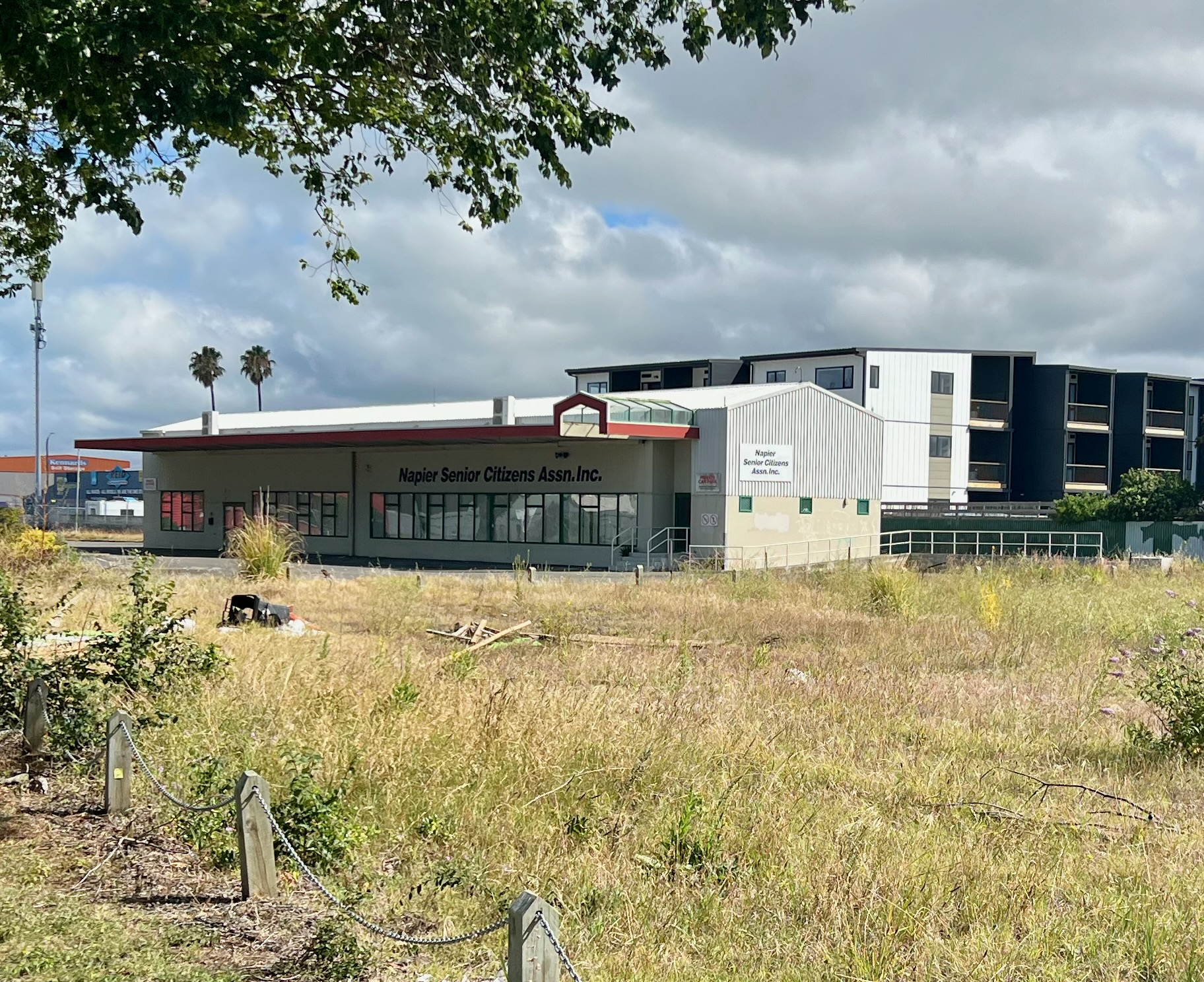
1990 station in 2025

The way and works depot, goods shed, locomotive servicing, repair shops and all but one track were moved to Pandora Point at the start of the Ahuriri Branch during a two-year programme across 1989–91. Afterwards, only a new InterCity coach and train terminal remained on the city site, fronting Munroe Street. The old station was closed on 6 October 1990, with a new station opened on 9 June 1991. The former station and three-storey administrative block built in the late 1950s and early 1960s were demolished, making three hectares of land available for retail development. Car parks, shops and offices were built over the former station and yard site. A development of up to 110 homes was proposed in 2024 on 1.28 ha (3.2 acres) of the former station site, included in the Ahuriri Hapu Claims Settlement.

On Monday 1 October 1990, a New Freight Terminal opened on the site of the former exchange sidings with the Napier Harbour Board. Napier Freight Terminal, which is now accessed by the Port of Napier's Western Gate, off Breakwater Road. A marshalling yard, locomotive depot, and other facilities were also established at Pandora Point. A triangular junction gave direct access north and south from the port branch. The Ahuriri yard was closed. The old main line north to Gisborne was realigned to the east to allow a new link road to the Tamatea area of Napier, and railways land was redeveloped as an industrial subdivision.

=== Passenger services ===
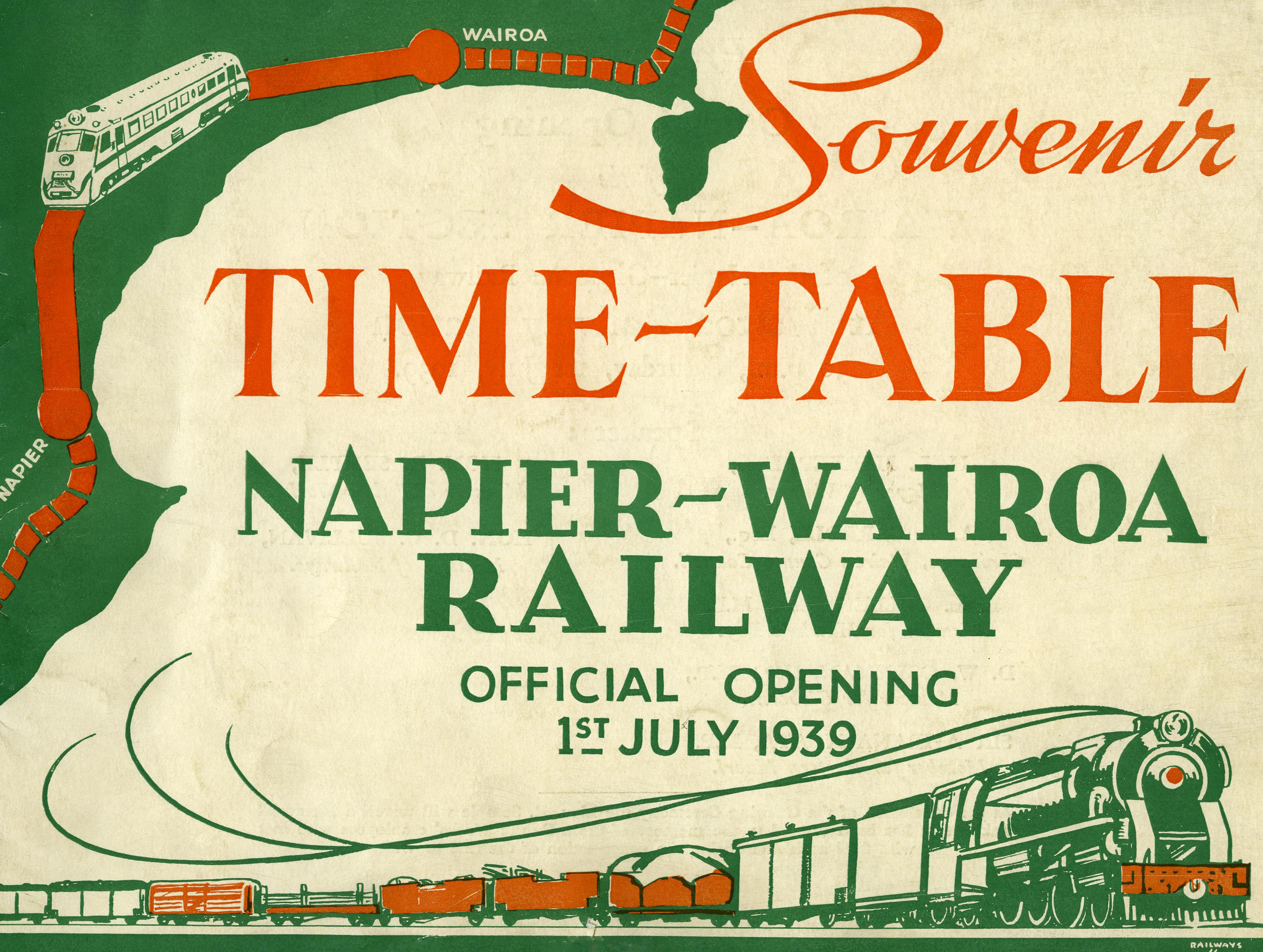
Napier-Wairoa Souvenir Timetable 1939

Until the completion of the line from Napier to Palmerston North, passengers were catered for solely by slow mixed trains that also conveyed goods. Coaches used were 18 x A class bogie (probably Addington designed with clerestory roofs), 2 x 30 ft. B class bogies, 6 x 6-wheel C class and 5 x 4-wheel D class. The 1875 timetable allowed 50 minutes for the journey between Napier and Hastings.

In September 1887, after the railway to Woodville opened on 22 March 1887, 3 x NZR J class locomotives were transferred to Napier. Other trains were worked by 11 x F class 0-6-0STs. Expresses were limited to 80 tons, but they could take goods wagons between principal stations. When the Wellington & Manawatu Railway (WMR) was linked via the Gorge in 1891, a train left Napier at 10.45am and arrived in Wellington at 9.50pm. From 13 December 1897, after opening of the Wairarapа line, through trains were about an hour slower by that route. Southbound, the express left Napier at 8.05am and, although there were now 17 stops between Napier and Woodville instead of 12, Woodville, 94.4 mi (151.9 km), was reached in 4hr 50min There the train reversed and, after a 20min stop, became a mixed train, leaving at 1.15pm. Wellington, 209.2 mi (336.7 km) was reached at 8.25 and Te Aro at 8.37pm. The northbound train took 12hr 23min. When the through train ran via the Wairarapa, W^{A} class hauled trains linked Palmerston North and Woodville. The slower trains weren't popular; the Waipawa Mail noted that the first train via the Wairarapa had only 3 passengers, an MP, a policeman and a swagger, and that the only one who paid a fare was the swagger. Early in 1898, both trains were reclassified Mail, and from 1 September 1899, the 45 min allowed for the 11.9 miles from Napier to Hastings was cut to 30 min. From 1 December 1900, fewer stops cut the time to 10hr 50min and from 1 November 1901 to 10hr 35min. In 1897, Palmerston North passengers had a wait of 1½ or 2 hours at Woodville, possibly to discourage passengers from using the WMR, but it may have been to avoid extra train mileage at a time when two old K class 2-4-2s had to be transferred from South Island, even though they could only pull 55 tons up the 1 in 40 to Cross Creek and 100 tons up the 1 in 80 from Masterton to Eketāhuna. In 1899 3 x N class 2-6-2s also came from South Island and 3 more in 1901, the Ks being sent to Auckland in 1902. The Ns could take 7 cars and a 44 ft. van up Matamau and Te Aute banks and the 1 in 80 from Hukanui to Masterton, but only 80 tons from Featherston to Cross Creek. In 1907, the Mail had 2 small M class 2-4-4Ts when it was too heavy for an N class.

About 1900 trains were gas-lit (see Pintsch gas), unheated, with bench-seats and birdcage cars. A greater proportion of 47½ ft. round-roofed cars were introduced in the 1900s, complete with continuous brakes, though these still had the long bench seats in 2nd class. Electric lighting replaced gas on principal long-distance trains in the late 1920s, and steel-panelled cars formed the Main Trunk expresses between 1931 and 1933, the wider cars being cascaded to the Napier line. Between 1934 and 1936, 15 x new 50ft. steel-panelled centre-lavatory cars with vestibule, chair seating, steam-heating and covered gang ways (1809, 1812, 1813, 1814, 1826–35, and 1840, with 2nd-class Scarrett seat (wider and higher backed, padded, red leather seats) and 4 x 1st class cars 1836-39 were allocated to Wellington) replaced open platforms on some provincial express and passenger trains, mainly Wellington-Napier trains. They were gradually replaced by 56ft. stock in the later 1940s.

After the WMR purchase, from 6 December 1909, the Napier Mail ran via the WMR, and the Wairarapa Mail, connected at Woodville for Masterton and Wellington. Initially the Mail took 9hr 45min down and 10hr 30min up, over 198.9 mi (320.1 km) via the WMR. From 1 July 1912, the main refreshment stop was Woodville, instead of Palmerston North. 35 mph (56 km/h) was the Napier-Woodville limit, but on parts of WMR it was 40 mph (64 km/h). As traffic grew, about 1914, 2 former WMR 4-6-0 U^{D} class went to Napier, allowing 10 coaches without assistance. From 1 November 1914, speed limits were lifted from 35 mph (56 km/h) to 45 mph (72 km/h). 2 x A class 4-6-2s replaced the U^{D}s, allowing 225 tons on Opapa and Matamau banks. The Mail then took 9hr 5min, though only missing Khandallah and Ngaio stops.

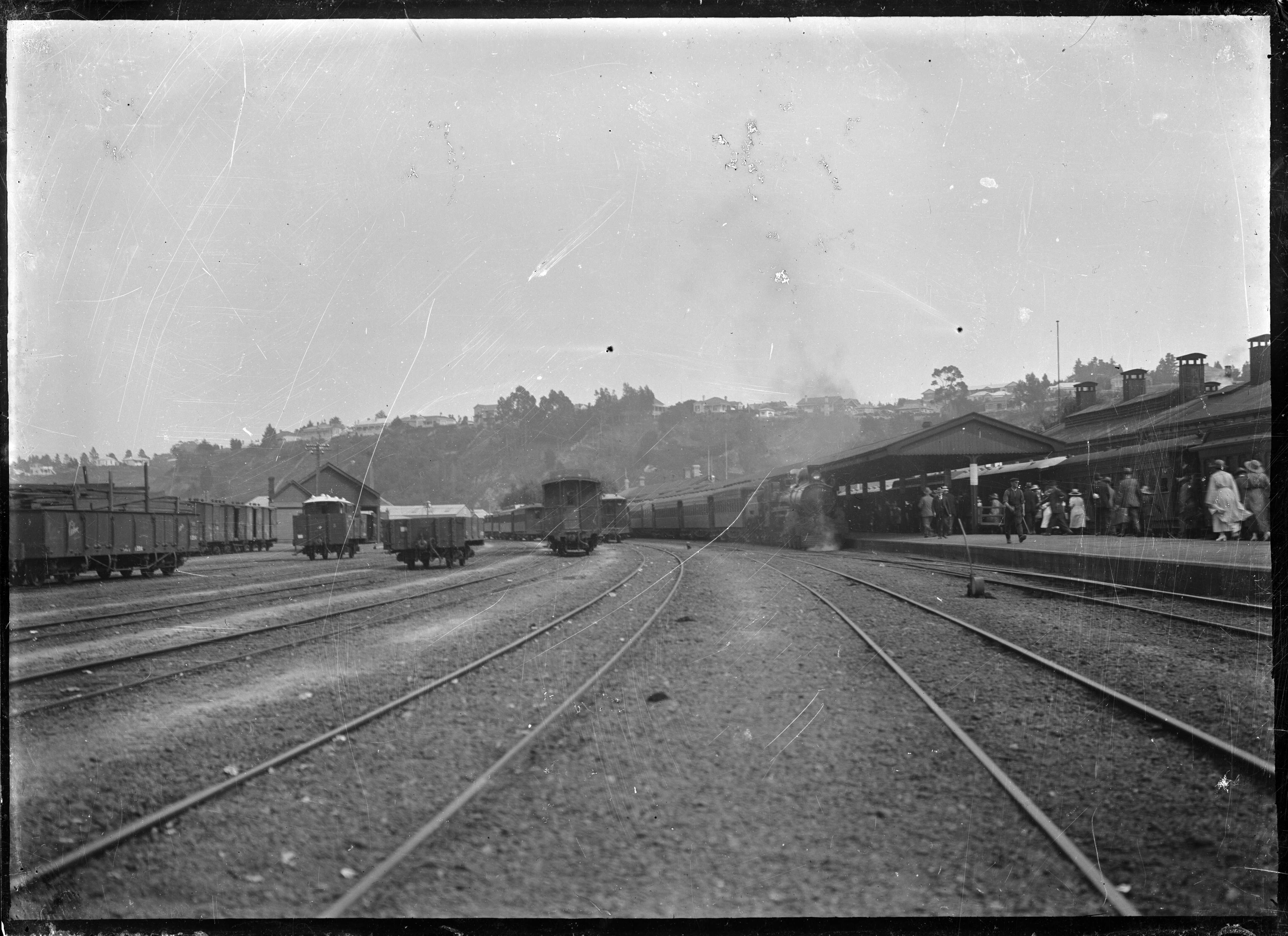
Napier Mail leaving Napier about 1922

From 9 August 1925, the Napier Mail became the Napier Express, its limit was raised to 50 mph (80 km/h) and stops cut to 16, taking 7hr 37min. When the Tawa Flat deviation opened in 1937, the Express took 7hr 32min, including 45 minutes from Levin for 28.6 mi (46.0 km) to Palmerston North. In January 1944, a coal saving timetable cut the trains from 6 to 3 days a week, and in 1946, to 2 days, but from 28 November 1949, the Express left Napier at 8.30am and Wellington at 9.25am, taking 7 hours, times kept until replaced by railcars from 1 December 1954.

The A^{B} class replaced the A class about 1926, though in the late 30s a K class sometimes hauled the Wellington-Palmerston North section. The K^{A} class took over the expresses in the early 1940s, with heavier loads during the war of 15 cars or more. Following a trial run in 1938, NZR RM class Standard railcars began operating a service between Napier and Wairoa on 3 July 1939, and when the line to Gisborne was completed, the Gisborne Express was introduced on 7 September 1942, running from Wellington through to Gisborne. Passenger trains ran to Pūtorinō from 6 October 1930. When the line was extended to Wairoa, it was served by railcars from its opening.

On 26 November 1954, it was announced that "the immediate, urgent need for releasing steam locomotives and crews to move the steadily increasing goods traffic has made it imperative to withdraw steam express trains from the Wellington-Napier-Gisborne route" from 1 December. Two Standard railcars ran each way, leaving Wellington at 7.57am and 2.25pm, and Napier at 8.05 am. and 1.50pm, taking about 5 hours on the 196.3 mi (315.9 km). 88 seaters twin-coach railcars ran from April 1955, but by June the new railcars were being reported as breaking down. From 1 August 1955, there was a daily through run to Gisborne. After 1964, Napier-Wellington times ranged between 5hr. 30min. for the 8.05am train from Napier to 5hr. 45min. for the afternoon trains. To augment the express trains and railcars, other mixed trains and local passenger trains also once operated between various destinations, including intermediate termini such as Waipukurau, but these had all ceased by the 1960s.

In 1968 and 1971, cuts were made as the railcars wore out, and on 6 November 1972, they were cancelled entirely on the Wellington to Napier run and replaced by the Endeavour, which was modelled on the successful Southerner. Railcars survived on the run through to Gisborne until 30 May 1976, when they were replaced by an extension of the Endeavour. It ran once daily in each direction, but its quality gradually declined during the 1980s as the rolling stock was reallocated to other trains; this included the removal of a buffet car, necessitating lengthy refreshment stops in Napier and Palmerston North. On 8 March 1988, Cyclone Bola significantly damaged the line between Napier and Gisborne, resulting in the truncation of passenger services to Napier. Passenger services never ran beyond Napier in regular service again. The Endeavour was a D^{A}-hauled, 6-car, 180-ton train. For the first time on New Zealand Railways, a locomotive-hauled train had a 50 mph (80 km/h) start-to-stop timing (Levin-Palmerston North, 28.5 miles in 34 minutes), though the overall time was 5½ hours, with a 33.7 mph (54.2 km/h) average from Napier to Woodville, including 3 stops.

On 11 December 1989, the Endeavour was replaced by the Bay Express. This train restored the standards of the original 1972 Endeavour, and it operated throughout the 1990s. Declining patronage and an unwillingness on the part of Tranz Scenic to replace the decades-old rolling stock meant that the Bay Express was cancelled from 7 October 2001. Since this time, the PNGL has been entirely freight only. In 2017, a report said one of the restrictions was a 70 km/h (43 mph) on the whole line.

In 1969, the daily Gisborne-Wellington railcar took 4 hours 1 minute for the first 132 mi (212 km) to Napier and 5¾ hours for the remaining 199 mi (320 km) to Wellington. The Endeavour was introduced on Sunday, 6 November 1972 as a carriage train to replace the morning railcar service between Wellington and Napier. The Bay Express was cancelled on 7 October 2001, after West Coast Rail failed to get a subsidy of $300,000 a year to keep it running, as Tranz Scenic services were thought to be breaking even. The Bay Express was the last regular passenger service to use the station, but heritage excursion services visit the station multiple times each year.

=== Patronage ===
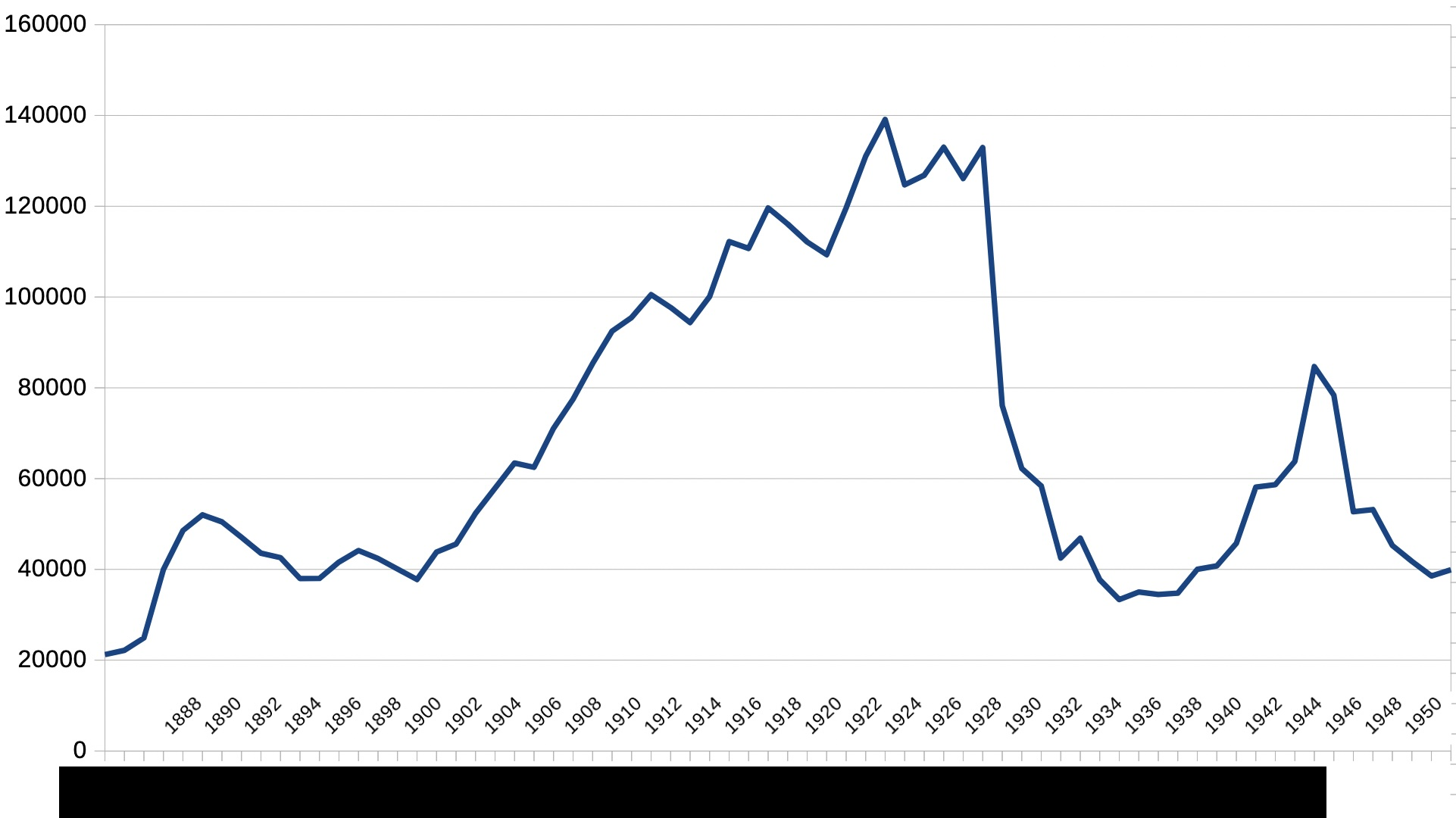
Chart of Napier railway station passengers 1881-1950

Traffic grew to a peak in 1921, but plunged in 1926, due to the start of a Napier-Hastings bus service in November 1925, and more after the line was closed by the 1931 earthquake, as shown in the graph and table below. Tickets sales 1881–1950 – derived from annual returns to Parliament of "Statement of Revenue for each Station for the Year ended".

year	tickets	season tickets	staff	ref.
1881	21,233		2	
1882	22,159		5	
1883	24,895		6	
1884	40,004		8	
1885	48,561	120	14	
1886	52,018	114	12	
1887	50,480	132	15	
1888	47,059	101	14	
1889	43,569	131	14	
1890	42,588	164	14	
1891	37,972	157	15	
1892	38,004	217	17	
1893	41,622	349	19	
1894	44,170	393	18	
1895	42,416	779	18	
1896				
1897	37,764	1,114	18	
1898	43,831	1,146	24	
1899	45,582	1,260	23	
1900	52,335	1,122	23	
1901				
1902	63,440	1,164	25	
1903	62,491	877	24	
1904	71,078	915	24	
1905	77,513	1,389	27	
1906	85,353	1,882	28	
1907	92,478	1,892	30	
1908	95,479	2,362	32	
1909	100,522	1,822	36	
1910	97,695	1,581	34	
1911	94,367	1,494	31	
1912	100,103	1,629	31	
1913	112,230	1,994	31	
1914	110,712	2,605		
1915	119,647	4,098		
1916	116,089	3,214		
1917	112,116	2,460		
1918	109,329	2,180		
1919	119,660	1,928		
1920	131,025	2,492		
1921	139,113	2,241		
1922	124,710	2,664		
1923	126,826	2,914		
1924	133,003	2,967		
1925	126,114	3,596		
1926	132,944	4,323		
1927	76,092	2,586		
1928	62,237	2,635		
1929	58,387	2,645		
1930	42,512	2,122		
1931	46,871	1,591		
1932	37,731	381		
1933	33,348	523		
1934	35,014	276		
1935	34,491	251		
1936	34,748	193		
1937	40,008	176		
1938	40,789	393		
1939	45,754	335		
1940	58,125	211		
1941	58,678	180		
1942	63,804	229		
1943	84,685	239		
1944	78,382	312		
1945	52,705	138		
1946	53,179	114		
1947	45,262	99		
1948	41,792	110		
1949	38,551	69		
1950	39,917	45		

=== Engine shed ===
The original shed for 2 engines was extended in 1878 and a wheel lathe was added. Further additions were made in 1940, and by 1973, the light repair depot was 93 ft (28 m) x 40 ft (12 m). A new diesel depot was built in 1975 and a fuel tank installed from Taumarunui. In 1990, the light repair depot was moved to Auckland to replace its Passenger Vehicle Depot building. A 14 ft (4.3 m) turntable was added in 1874, replaced by a 55 ft (17 m) turntable in 1912 and a 70 ft (21 m) turntable in 1936, when the old turntable was sent to Cromwell. About 1990, it was replaced by a triangle at Pandora.

=== Workshops ===
In 1875, land reclamation began for a carriage shed, which was finished in stages to 1877. Napier had a locomotive works on another reclaimed site from 1879 until 1929, when much of its work was transferred to Hutt Workshops and staff were cut from 107 to 30, many being transferred south. Building started in 1881, and the works started in 1883. By 1884, the works had 60 ft (18 m) x 43 ft (13 m) fitting and repairing shop, a 43 ft (13 m) x 43 ft (13 m) machine shop, a 50 ft (15 m) x 40 ft (12 m) smithy, 40 ft (12 m) x 20 ft (6.1 m) boiler shop, 60 ft (18 m) x 43 ft (13 m) sawmill and a 75 ft (23 m) x 43 ft (13 m) carriage and wagon workshop. A 1924 report recommended closing the locomotive works.

== Incidents ==
In the early hours of 8 April 1974, two D^{A}s and a freight train from the south, in thick fog, derailed when the train ran through points at the entrance to the yard at about 80 km/h (50 mph) (there was a 25 km/h (16 mph) limit). The crew escaped with minor injuries. Steam cranes lifted the D^{A}s, which had fallen over.

== Te Awa railway station ==
Te Awa was a siding, opened as Napier South on 6 June 1926, renamed on 1 April 1930 and closed on 29 November 1949. There was a sign, but no building at the station. The station was also known as the High School siding.
