= Esk River (Hawke's Bay) =

River in the Hawke's Bay Region, New Zealand

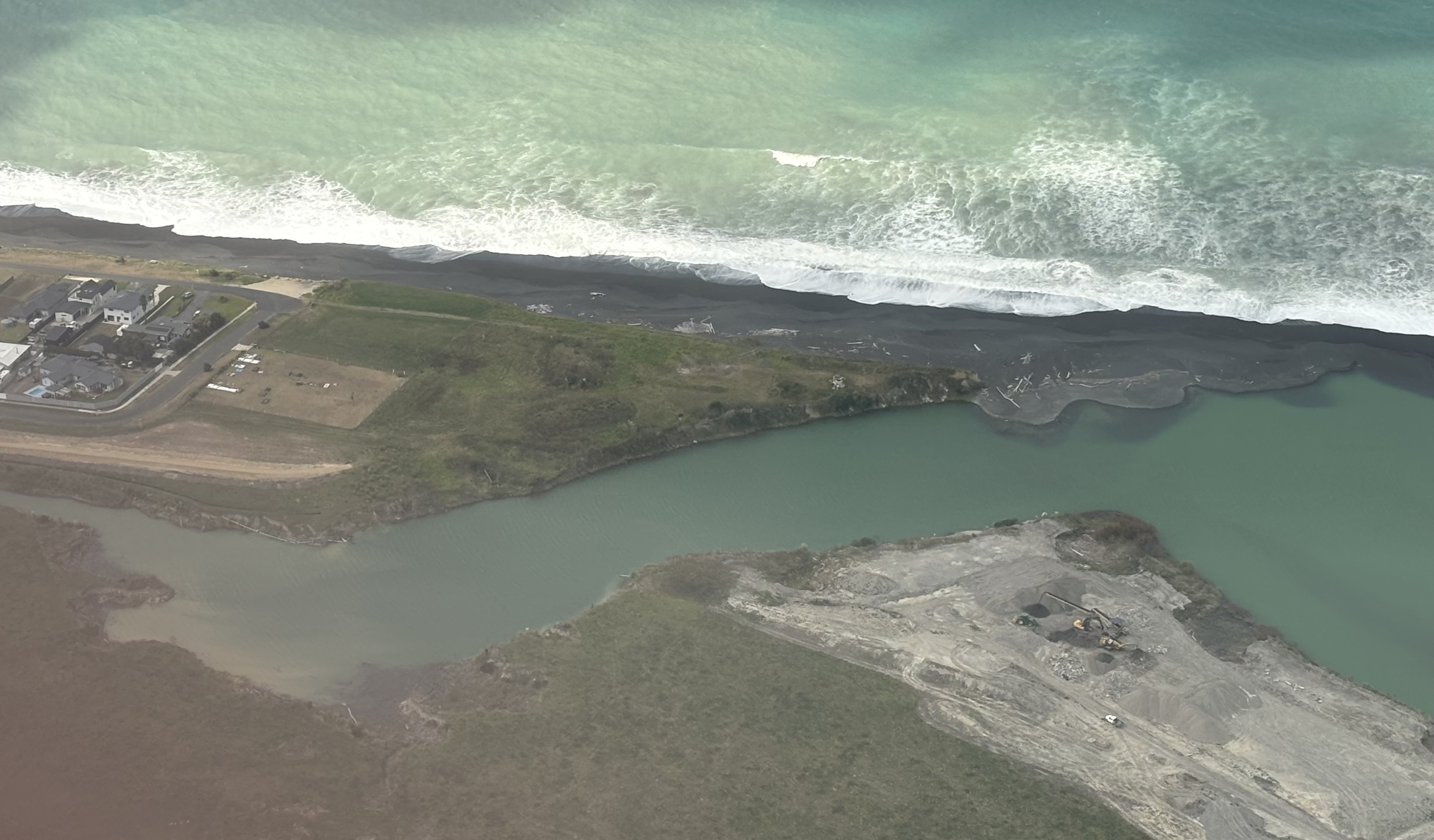
- The Esk River mouth
- Route of the Esk River
- Mouth of the Esk River Esk River (Hawke's Bay) (North Island)
- Native name: Te Hukawai-o-Hinganga, Te Wai-o-Hingānga, Waiohinganga (Māori)

Location
- Country: New Zealand
- Island: North Island
- Region: Hawke's Bay
- District: Hastings, Napier City

Physical characteristics
- Source: Maungaharuru Range
  - coordinates: 39.17203°S 176.70402°E
- Mouth: Hawke Bay
  - coordinates: 39°23′52″S 176°53′06″E
- Length: 43 km (27 mi)

Basin features
- Progression: Esk River → Hawke Bay → Pacific Ocean
- Tributaries
  - right: Okurakura Stream, Deep Stream, Kaiwaka Stream, Rautōiti Stream, Munro Stream

The Esk River of Hawke's Bay, in the eastern North Island of New Zealand, one of two rivers of that name in the country, is one of Hawke's Bay's major rivers. It flows south from the Maungaharuru Range before turning east to reach Hawke Bay 10 kilometres (6 mi) north of Napier. State Highway 5 follows the lower course of the river for several kilometres close to the settlement of Eskdale.

== Etymology ==
The river is probably named after the River Esk in southern Scotland and north-west England. The river has had four names. Ahuriri Hapū refer to Esk River as Te Hukawai-o-Hinganga, as it was fast flowing, creating a froth (hukawai). An abbreviation of that name was Waiohinganga, which is the name shown on early maps, being the northern boundary of the Ahuriri Block in 1851. Ngāti Pāhauwera and Maungaharuru Tangitū refer to the river as Te Wai-o-Hingānga.

By 1862 the name Esk was described as a, "modern designation, which has, notwithstanding, generally failed to become acclimatized". In 1865 it was referred to as 'Waiohinganga or Petane River. An 1871 description said the Napier-Tāupō road followed the Petane River bed for several miles. In the 1890s one caption used 'Petane or Esk River'. The Geographic Board notes that it, "is the only surviving English river name in Hawke's Bay, all the others having reverted to their Māori names. There are several places of the same name, all probably originating from the Scottish Esk."

== Geography ==
The river rises in the Maungaharuru Range, flowing through the Esk Valley and veering east when it reaches the Heipipi hills. The upper Esk catchment is mostly in plantation forestry but has some intensive dairy farming. The middle and lower reaches are mainly in pastoral farming with some vineyards and orchards. The river has varying levels of pollution and is thought to be getting worse. Where the river reaches the sea, it ponds behind a shingle bank. At times the sea drives up shingle that blocks the outlet until the ponding water breaks through. The outlet occasionally needs to be opened artificially to prevent flooding. Prior to the 1931 Hawke's Bay earthquake, the pond also flowed into the Petane Stream and south through Bay View into the northern end of Ahuriri Lagoon when the beach outlet was blocked. The earthquake raised the area, preventing the ponded water from flowing through Bay View any longer.

The southern stretch of the river forms the northern boundary for urban development in Napier. Hukarere Girls' College is near the river, as well as the Pan Pac Forest Products mill. A 4 MW hydroelectric power scheme is situated in the higher reaches of the river. Chardonnay and red wine grapes are grown in the Esk River valley.

== Biodiversity ==
Native fish in the river include longfin eel, shortfin eel, inanga, common smelt, koaro, koura, banded kokopu, pataki (black flounder), torrent fish, common bully, giant bully, blue gill bully, and redfin bully. The Esk also has a healthy rainbow and brown trout fishery.

== Recreation ==
The lower 19 kilometres (12 mi) of the Esk can be suitable for whitewater canoeing when the flow is above normal. There are brown and rainbow trout in the river, but fishing is restricted.

== History ==
The river has traditional significance for Ngāti Kahungunu, including Ahuriri Hapū and Maungaharuru Tangitū, and to Ngāti Pāhauwera. It is a traditional rohe boundary marker for Ngāti Pāhauwera. Of the Ahuriri Hapū, Ngāti Tū are traditionally associated with the Esk valley. In the 1830s, the river mouth was the focal point for Ngāti Matepū, Ngāi Te Ruruku and Ngāti Tū, who occupied Kapemaihi pā at the northern end of the Ahuriri Lagoon. By 1849, the hapū of Kapemaihi pā moved north to Poraaira / Pētane, near the left bank of the modern river mouth. Traditional sites include kāinga, pā and wāhi tapu, including Maungaharuru Tangitū-associated sites of Nukurangi pā near river mouth and Heipipi pā further inland. The river is an important resource, where fish including eels, inanga, kahawai were harvested, as well as ākahi (fresh water mussels), kōura (fresh water crayfish) and shrimp were traditionally harvested.

In the 1931 Hawke's Bay earthquake, the river diverted flow from the Ahuriri Lagoon, instead began flowing directly eastwards into Hawke Bay.

=== Flooding ===
The river has a history of flooding. Flash flooding inundated the settlement in March 2018, leaving most of the local holiday park underwater. Large parts of the valley were inundated during Cyclone Gabrielle in February 2023. The floods caused significant damage in the settlement, destroying houses and sections of State Highway 5 and the Palmerston North–Gisborne Railway Line. There were also floods in 1938.

The Esk has a mean annual flow of 5.237 cubic metres per second (184.9 cu ft/s) measured at Waipunga Bridge.

== Gallery ==
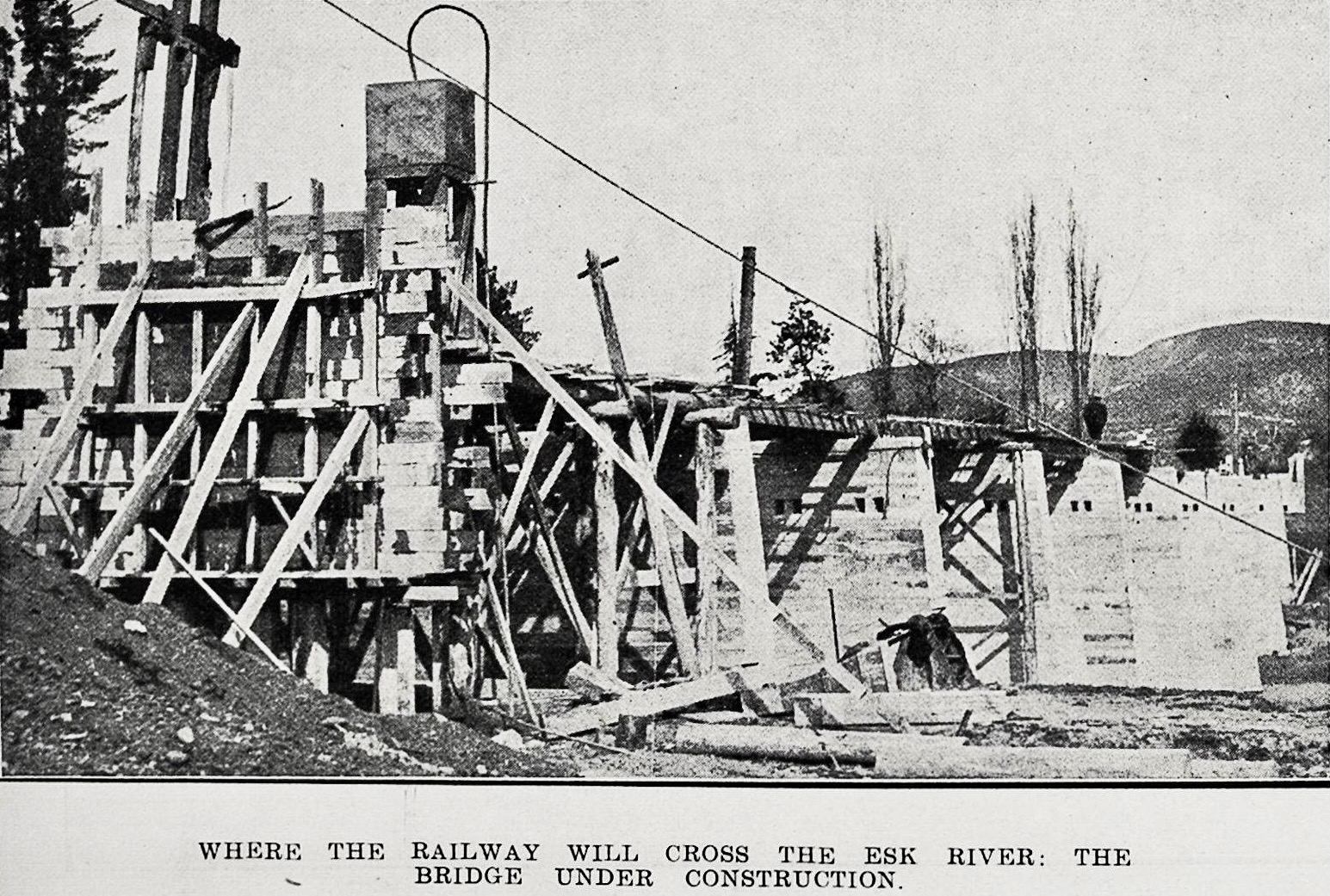
Bridge over the Esk River being built in 1924

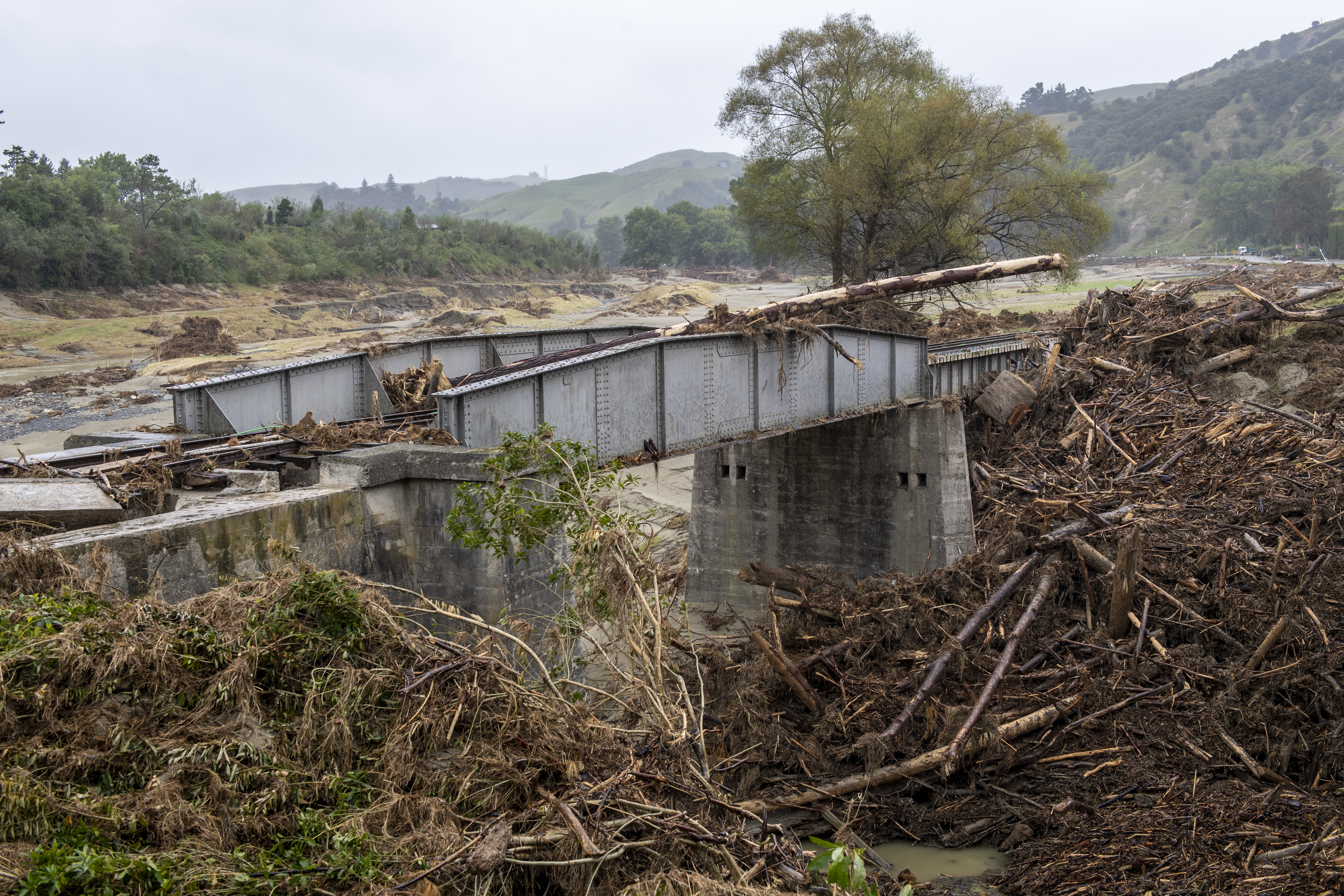
Railway bridge over the Esk River, after Cyclone Gabrielle

== See also ==
- List of rivers of New Zealand
