= Maungaharuru Tangitū =

Māori iwi

- Iwi (tribe) in Māoridom

Maungaharuru Tangitū is a collective of Māori hapū (subtribes) of the Ngāti Kahungunu iwi in Hawke's Bay, New Zealand, who joined forces for Treaty of Waitangi settlement negotiations. The hapū are Marangatūhetaua (also known as Ngāti Tū), Ngāi Tauira, Ngāi Te Ruruku ki Tangoio, Ngāi Tahu, Ngāti Kurumōkihi (formerly known as Ngāi Tatara) and Ngāti Whakaari. The group's rohe (tribal area) ranges from Bay View in the south to the Waitaha Stream (just north of the Waikari River) in the north, and from the Maungaharuru Range in the west to the sea in Hawke Bay, that part of the sea being known as Tangitū.

The hapū have one marae, the Tangoio Marae at the rural locality of Tangoio, about 20 kilometres north of Napier. Pūnanga Te Wao is the name of the meeting house. In October 2020, the Government committed $6,020,910 from the Provincial Growth Fund to upgrade it and 18 other Hawke's Bay marae, creating 39 jobs.

== See also ==
- List of Māori iwi
