= Eskdale, New Zealand =

Settlement in Hawke's Bay Region, New Zealand

Eskdale
- Settlement
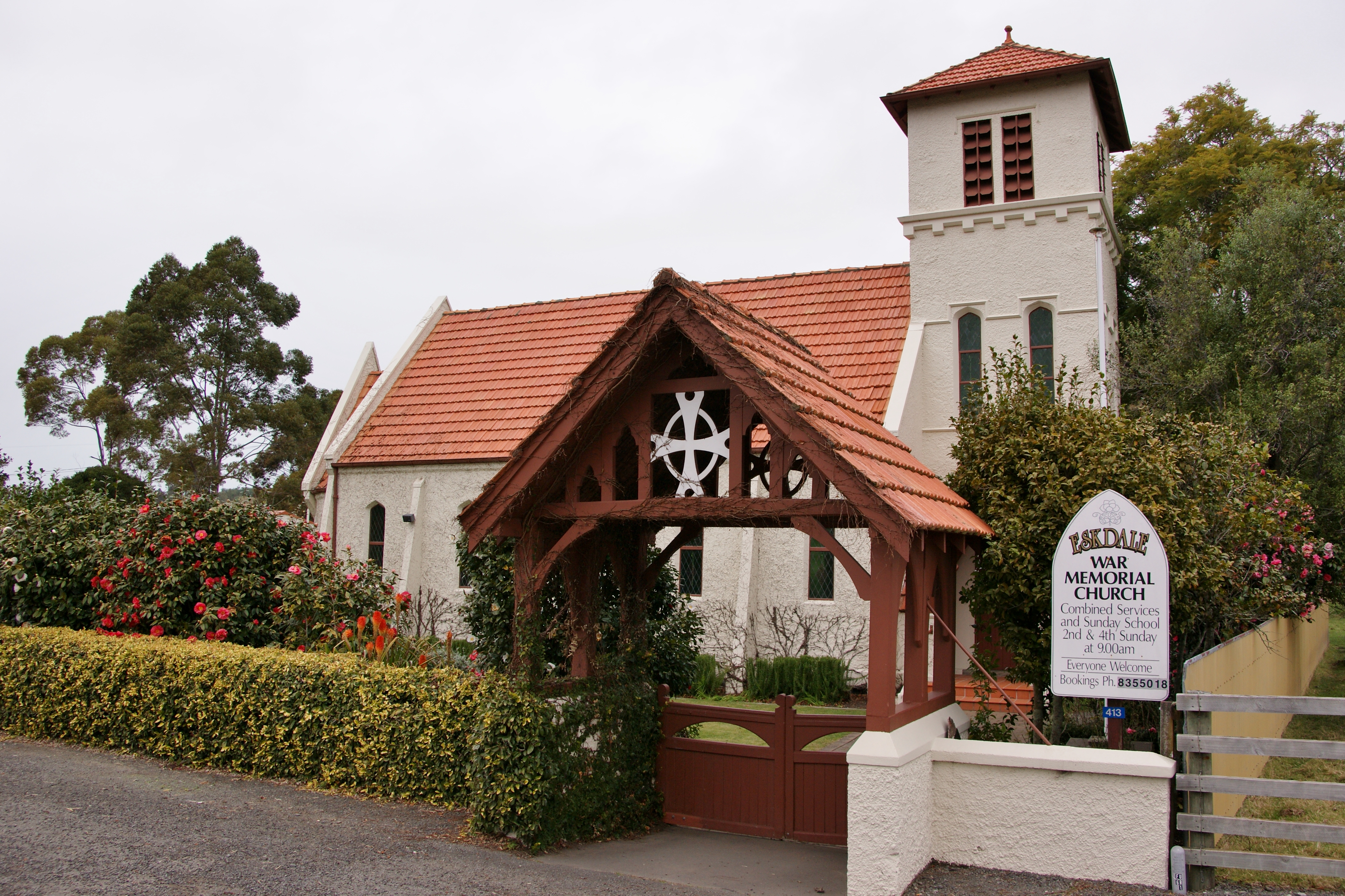
- Eskdale War Memorial Church
- Interactive map of Eskdale
- Coordinates: 39.403450°S 176.852263°E
- Country: New Zealand
- Region: Hawke's Bay Region
- Territorial authority: Hastings District
- Ward: Mohaka General Ward; Takitimu Māori Ward
- Community: Hastings District Rural Community
- Subdivision: Tūtira subdivision
- Electorates: Napier; Ikaroa-Rāwhiti (Māori)

Government
  - Territorial Authority: Hastings District Council
  - Regional council: Hawke's Bay Regional Council
  - Mayor of Hastings: Wendy Schollum
  - Napier MP: Katie Nimon
  - Ikaroa-Rāwhiti MP: Cushla Tangaere-Manuel

Area
  - Total: 114.94 km^{2} (44.38 sq mi)

Population (2023 Census)
  - Total: 756
  - Density: 6.58/km^{2} (17.0/sq mi)
- Postcode(s): 4182

Eskdale is a rural settlement in the Hastings District and Hawke's Bay region of New Zealand's North Island. It is located north of Napier on State Highway 5, near the mouth of the Esk River.

== Description and history ==
The valley has many vineyards, wineries, orchards and fishing spots. The Eskdale War Memorial Church was designed by James Chapman-Taylor, and dedicated to Percival Moore Beattie, a local man killed in World War I.

The river has a history of flooding. Flash flooding inundated the settlement in March 2018, leaving most of the local holiday parks underwater. Flooding during Cyclone Gabrielle in February 2023 inundated large parts of the valley, causing significant damage in the settlement, destroying houses and sections of State Highway 5 and the Palmerston North–Gisborne Railway Line.

A wildfire broke out near Eskdale in March 2019.

== Demographics ==
Eskdale and its surrounds cover 114.94 km^{2} (44.38 sq mi). It is part of the Puketapu-Eskdale statistical area.

Historical population for Eskdale and surrounds
| Year | Pop. | ±% p.a. |
|---|---|---|
| 2006 | 420 | — |
| 2013 | 621 | +5.75% |
| 2018 | 714 | +2.83% |
| 2023 | 756 | +1.15% |
The 2006 population is for a smaller area of 97.38 km^{2}. Source:

Eskdale had a population of 756 in the 2023 New Zealand census, an increase of 42 people (5.9%) since the 2018 census, and an increase of 135 people (21.7%) since the 2013 census. There were 375 males and 375 females in 225 dwellings. 1.6% of people identified as LGBTIQ+. There were 162 people (21.4%) aged under 15 years, 84 (11.1%) aged 15 to 29, 387 (51.2%) aged 30 to 64, and 120 (15.9%) aged 65 or older.

People could identify as more than one ethnicity. The results were 88.5% European (Pākehā); 14.7% Māori; 0.8% Pasifika; 2.4% Asian; 0.4% Middle Eastern, Latin American and African New Zealanders (MELAA); and 7.1% other, which includes people giving their ethnicity as "New Zealander". English was spoken by 98.4%, Māori by 2.0%, and other languages by 5.2%. No language could be spoken by 1.6% (e.g. too young to talk). The percentage of people born overseas was 13.5, compared with 28.8% nationally.

Religious affiliations were 30.2% Christian, 0.4% Māori religious beliefs, 0.8% Buddhist, and 1.2% other religions. People who answered that they had no religion were 61.1%, and 5.6% of people did not answer the census question.

Of those at least 15 years old, 156 (26.3%) people had a bachelor's or higher degree, 330 (55.6%) had a post-high school certificate or diploma, and 96 (16.2%) people exclusively held high school qualifications. 99 people (16.7%) earned over $100,000 compared to 12.1% nationally. The employment status of those at least 15 was 321 (54.0%) full-time, 75 (12.6%) part-time, and 6 (1.0%) unemployed.

=== Puketapu-Eskdale statistical area ===
Puketapu-Eskdale statistical area, which also includes Puketapu and Whirinaki, covers 259.60 km^{2} (100.23 sq mi) and had an estimated population of 2,650 as of June 2025, with a population density of 10 people per km^{2}.

Historical population for Puketapu-Eskdale
| Year | Pop. | ±% p.a. |
|---|---|---|
| 2006 | 2,052 | — |
| 2013 | 2,250 | +1.32% |
| 2018 | 2,670 | +3.48% |
| 2023 | 2,709 | +0.29% |
The 2006 population is for a smaller area of 244.98 km^{2}. Source:

Puketapu-Eskdale had a population of 2,709 in the 2023 New Zealand census, an increase of 39 people (1.5%) since the 2018 census, and an increase of 459 people (20.4%) since the 2013 census. There were 1,338 males, 1,365 females, and 6 people of other genders in 807 dwellings. 1.4% of people identified as LGBTIQ+. The median age was 47.6 years (compared with 38.1 years nationally). There were 495 people (18.3%) aged under 15 years, 357 (13.2%) aged 15 to 29, 1,371 (50.6%) aged 30 to 64, and 486 (17.9%) aged 65 or older.

People could identify as more than one ethnicity. The results were 89.7% European (Pākehā); 16.5% Māori; 1.7% Pasifika; 1.3% Asian; 0.6% Middle Eastern, Latin American and African New Zealanders (MELAA); and 4.4% other, which includes people giving their ethnicity as "New Zealander". English was spoken by 98.4%, Māori by 3.9%, Samoan by 0.2%, and other languages by 4.7%. No language could be spoken by 1.3% (e.g. too young to talk). New Zealand Sign Language was known by 0.4%. The percentage of people born overseas was 14.3, compared with 28.8% nationally.

Religious affiliations were 28.6% Christian, 0.1% Hindu, 0.2% Islam, 1.2% Māori religious beliefs, 0.3% Buddhist, 0.3% New Age, and 1.1% other religions. People who answered that they had no religion were 62.1%, and 6.2% of people did not answer the census question.

Of those at least 15 years old, 540 (24.4%) people had a bachelor's or higher degree, 1,311 (59.2%) had a post-high school certificate or diploma, and 372 (16.8%) people exclusively held high school qualifications. The median income was $48,300, compared with $41,500 nationally. 339 people (15.3%) earned over $100,000 compared to 12.1% nationally. The employment status of those at least 15 was 1,209 (54.6%) full-time, 315 (14.2%) part-time, and 39 (1.8%) unemployed.

== Education ==
Eskdale School is a co-educational state primary school, with a roll of 280 as of July 2026. The school opened in 1859 and was redeveloped in the 1990s.

Hukarere Girls' College is a single-sex state-integrated secondary school, with a roll of 53 as of July 2026. The school was founded as Hukarere Native School for Girls in 1875 in Napier. It moved to its current site in 2003. It has strong ties to both the Anglican Church and to Māori culture.

== See also ==
Eskdale railway station
