= Gisborne railway station, New Zealand =

Former railway station in Gisborne, New Zealand

Gisborne
- Gisborne railway station and yards, c. 1927, before the station building was relocated in 1940. Photograph by Albert Percy Godber (Godber Collection, Alexander Turnbull Library).

General information
- Location: 268–270 Grey Street, Gisborne; New Zealand
- Coordinates: 38°40′12″S 178°01′15″E
- Line: Palmerston North–Gisborne Line
- Distance: 390.40 kilometres (242.58 mi) from Palmerston North

Construction
- Architect: George Troup
- Architectural style: Troup Vintage

Other information
- Classification: RHTNZ Category B building

History
- Opened: 26 June 1902
- Closed: 2002 (passengers); 2012 (freight)

Heritage New Zealand – Category 2
- Designated: 5 April 1984
- Reference no.: 3531
Location

Gisborne railway station is a former main-line railway station in Gisborne, New Zealand. Opened in 1902 as the terminus of an isolated railway serving the Poverty Bay district, it became the northern terminus of the Palmerston North–Gisborne Line following the completion of the railway from Napier in 1942.

The surviving station building was designed by railway architect George Troup and is listed as a Category 2 historic place by Heritage New Zealand. Regular passenger services ended in 1988, although the station was not formally closed to passenger traffic until 2002. Freight services ceased in 2012, following the mothballing of the railway north of Napier. The station precinct remains associated with the Gisborne City Vintage Railway, which operates heritage excursions on part of the former line.

== History ==
=== Construction and opening ===
Plans for Gisborne railway station were prepared in conjunction with the construction of a railway northwards from Gisborne towards the inland settlements of Poverty Bay. Tenders for the station buildings were invited in March 1901, and the contract was awarded the following month to Mathieson and Baldock.

The station complex was developed in stages before the opening of the railway. A contract for an engine shed and platelayer's cottage was awarded to Clayton Brothers in October 1900, with the work completed by January 1901. The main station buildings contract was awarded in April 1901 for £1,757 14s 9d and completed in October of that year, ahead of the opening of the Gisborne to Ormond section in June 1902.

The original design provided for separate ticket and parcels offices, a public lobby, a ladies' waiting room, offices for the stationmaster and district manager, and other railway facilities. The station was to be situated on the northern side of the railway, with access from Peel Street, and a platform approximately 300 feet (91 m) long. A goods shed was planned on the opposite side of the tracks, with access from Grey Street.

The station opened on 26 June 1902 with the completion of the railway between Gisborne and Ormond. The line was extended to Kaitaratahi in November of the same year and progressively further inland, eventually reaching Moutohora in 1917. Although originally intended to form part of a railway connection towards Auckland, the route was never completed beyond Moutohora.

Between 1915 and 1931 the Ngatapa Branch diverged from the northern railway near Makaraka. The branch was subsequently abandoned following the decision to construct the southern railway connection to Napier by the coastal route.

=== Early development ===
The provision of sufficient land for the railway terminus became an issue as expectations for the eventual expansion of the railway increased. In 1916, additional land was acquired from Māori owners in the Wai-o-Hiharore No. 2 block. The Poverty Bay Herald reported compensation of £5,649 for approximately 4½ acres, compared with £1,076 paid for four acres acquired in 1903. The additional acquisition followed an earlier undertaking by the government to return land that had not initially been required for railway purposes.

On 19 March 1918, a fire caused substantial damage to the station building, particularly the stationmaster's and porter's offices. The damaged sections were subsequently repaired.

=== Reconstruction and connection to Napier ===
The approaching completion of the railway from Napier prompted a major reconstruction of Gisborne station and its yards. Work began in 1940 on a scheme involving additional tracks and sidings, new signalling equipment, enlarged goods facilities and the relocation of the existing station building. Some rails and sleepers recovered from the dismantled Ngatapa Branch were reused in the new yard layout.

In September 1940, the station building, estimated to weigh approximately 70 tons, was moved about 50 feet (15 m) towards the Waikanae Creek. The building was jacked onto rollers and moved incrementally using four winches. Railway business continued throughout the operation, with temporary planks providing access to the building as it moved away from its original position.

Further work included the excavation of the old passenger platform, enlargement of the goods shed and preparation of additional railway tracks. By July 1941, eleven tracks were envisaged for the expanded terminus, while preparations were also being made to strengthen the Waikanae Creek railway bridge and introduce electrically operated points.

In March 1942, a 40-ton locomotive turntable was being installed to accommodate the larger locomotives intended to operate services between Gisborne and Napier. Automatic signalling equipment was also introduced for trains approaching Gisborne from the south.

The first scheduled passenger train from Gisborne to Napier departed on 7 September 1942, connecting Gisborne to the national railway network. The Minister of Railways, Robert Semple, attended the departure, although the gathering was not regarded as the formal opening ceremony for the line.

The reconstruction was accompanied by improvements to the station's surroundings, undertaken with the involvement of the Gisborne Thirty Thousand Club and the Gisborne and District Beautifying Society. Land beside the Waikanae Creek was levelled and landscaped, with gardens and roadside planting intended to improve the appearance of the railway entrance to the town.

=== Post-war operations and improvements ===
Following the opening of the southern railway connection, Gisborne became an important railway freight and passenger terminus. Traffic included livestock, timber, general merchandise and passengers travelling to and from other North Island centres.

The increased use of the station prompted requests for improvements to passenger facilities. In May 1945, the stationmaster reported that arrangements were being made to lengthen the platform after complaints that carriages on the night express extended beyond its ends, making boarding and alighting difficult.

For the financial year ended 31 March 1947, the station handled 31,833 tons of outward goods, compared with 20,771 tons in the preceding year. Inward freight also increased, from 24,920 to 30,662 tons. The outward traffic included substantial quantities of livestock, while the station also handled significant volumes of timber and general merchandise. Passenger numbers, however, declined from 32,195 to 29,970 over the same period.

Despite the earlier reconstruction, the capacity of the station yards remained a concern. In November 1947, the stationmaster warned that the existing facilities would be inadequate if the proposed railway connection northwards to Auckland were completed. Further expansion of the station and goods facilities was advocated, although shortages of construction materials were restricting improvements.

Improvements to passenger shelter were undertaken in 1949–1950. The platform verandah was extended towards the loading dock at the eastern end of the station, and the station approach between Peel and Grey streets was resealed. Additional verandah material from the former Te Karaka railway station was also incorporated into the Gisborne station building in 1950.

The station was also connected to Gisborne's port by a railway line serving the wharves and associated industries. By 1948, the Railways Department controlled the line as far as the Turanganui River bridge, while the Gisborne Harbour Board owned the line beyond it. The connection was used for goods traffic associated with the port and local freezing works.

The goods facilities continued to develop during the 1960s. By 1964, the station yard included six loops beside the main line, a separate goods shed loop, locomotive facilities and numerous sidings. In 1961, the station was scheduled to be repainted light green with white facings, with painting of the station buildings reported as complete by April 1964, apart from the locomotive and maintenance areas. Further additions to the goods shed were under construction in 1966, and in January 1968 the Railways Department approved $12,000 for a new high-level loading bank and siding on railway land west of Grey Street.

=== Decline and closure ===
The Moutohora Branch closed in 1959, leaving Gisborne as the northern terminus of the railway from Napier. Regular passenger services ceased in 1988 following damage to the railway caused by Cyclone Bola, and were not reinstated after the damaged railway was repaired. The station was formally closed to passenger traffic in August 2002.

Freight services continued until the Wairoa–Gisborne section of the railway was mothballed in 2012 following storm damage. The Napier–Wairoa section reopened for log traffic in 2019 but was again severely damaged by Cyclone Gabrielle in February 2023. The railway between Wairoa and Gisborne remains mothballed.

== Station building ==
=== Architecture ===
The surviving station building is an example of the Vintage station designs associated with railway architect George Troup. Compared with some other stations of this type, Gisborne has relatively restrained external decoration. It is a single-storey timber-framed building with rusticated weatherboard cladding and a corrugated-iron roof. The building has a long rectangular plan, with an extended verandah running along the railway platform.

The road-facing elevation has three gables and an entrance porch, while the windows are predominantly double-hung sashes. Much of the original interior joinery survives, including timber wall linings, dado mouldings, cornices and window frames. The building has been altered and extended on several occasions, including the 1940 relocation and subsequent changes to the stationmaster's office in 1944, booking office in 1964 and internal rooms in 1992.

=== Heritage recognition ===
The station was entered on the New Zealand Historic Places Register on 5 April 1984 and is now listed as a Category 2 historic place by Heritage New Zealand, registration number 3531. It is also classified as a Category B building by the Rail Heritage Trust of New Zealand.

The surviving station is significant as an example of Troup's railway architecture and for its association with the development of rail transport in the Gisborne district. Although substantially modified, it retains much of its original appearance and incorporates the verandah of the former Te Karaka railway station, which has since been demolished.

== Preservation and redevelopment ==
The Gisborne City Vintage Railway was established in 1985 to restore steam locomotive W^{A} 165, which had previously worked on the Gisborne railway system. In 1988, the locomotive's restoration was transferred to the former railway workshops at Gisborne station. Following restoration, the locomotive made its first public excursion from Gisborne to Muriwai on 22 October 2000.

=== Te Wai-o-Hiharore redevelopment ===
In 2025, Tūranga Group Holdings Limited (TGHL), the commercial entity of the Rongowhakaata Iwi Trust, developed plans to refurbish the historic railway station as part of its Te Wai-o-Hiharore redevelopment project. The project was intended to adapt the station building for commercial use while retaining its heritage character. The redevelopment programme included a new entrance and mahau on the northern side of the building, oriented towards the surrounding land and Waikanae Creek.

Tenders for the construction work were invited in July 2026, with submissions closing on 14 August. The proposed works included restoration of the exterior, structural upgrades, a complete internal fit-out and associated site works. Refurbishment of the railway platform and canopy was also included as a separate portion of the contract, reflecting the different ownership arrangements for the station building and railway infrastructure.

TGHL's development programme, published in December 2025, anticipated completion of the refurbishment and reopening of the building in late 2027.
