= Elgin, New Zealand =

Suburb of Gisborne, New Zealand

Elgin
- Suburb
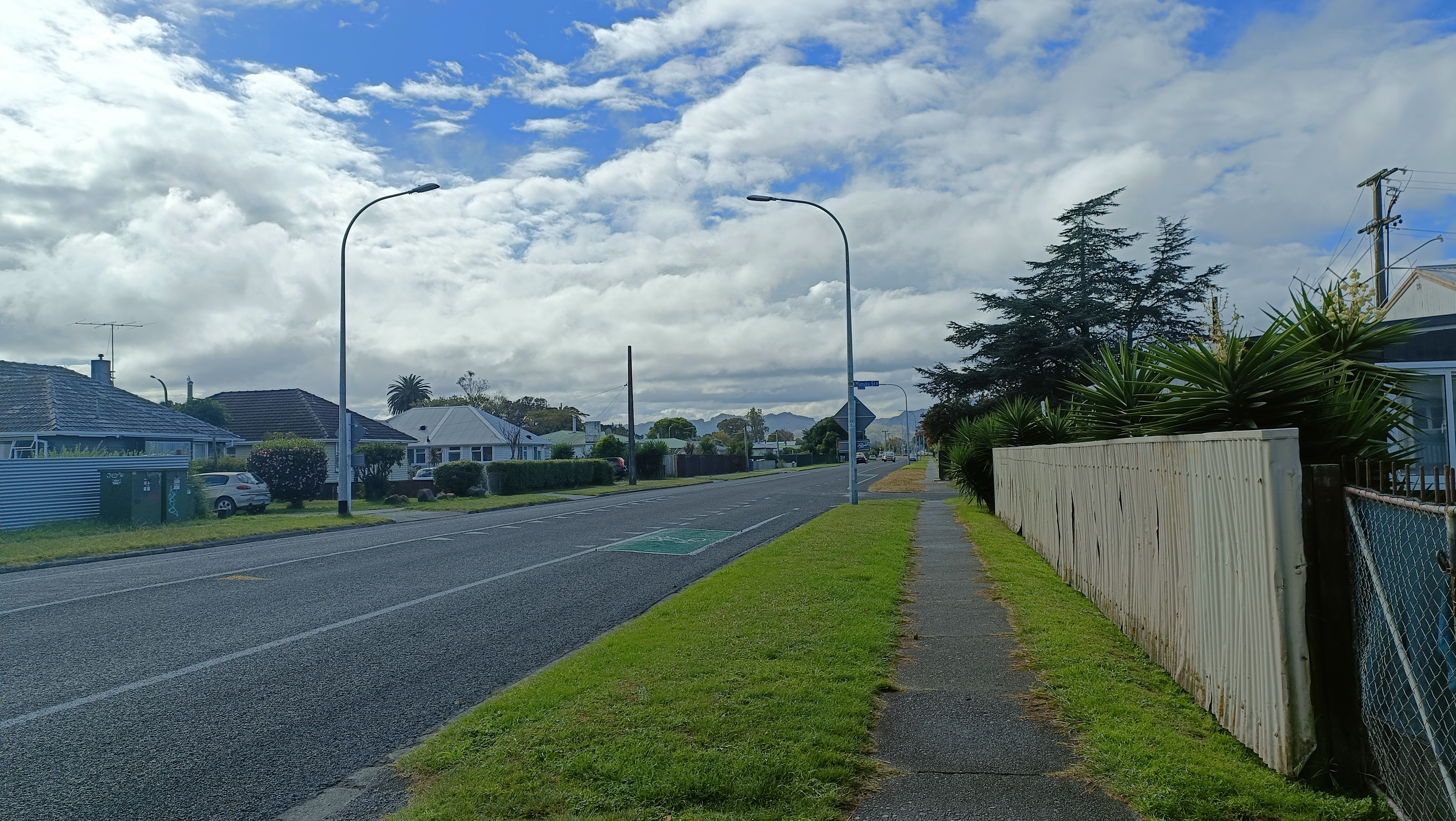
- Elgin
- Interactive map of Elgin
- Coordinates: 38.660087°S 177.994218°E
- Country: New Zealand
- City: Gisborne
- Local authority: Gisborne District Council
- Electoral ward: Tairāwhiti General Ward

Area
  - Land: 104 ha (260 acres)

Population (June 2025)
  - Total: 2,910
  - Density: 2,800/km^{2} (7,250/sq mi)
- Airports: Gisborne Airport

Makaraka	Te Hapara	Mangapapa
	Elgin	Gisborne Central
		Awapuni

Elgin is a suburb of Gisborne, in the Gisborne District of New Zealand's North Island. It is located east and north of Awapuni, south of Te Hapara and west of Gisborne Central.

== Demographics ==
Elgin covers 1.04 km^{2} (0.40 sq mi) and had an estimated population of 2,910 as of June 2025, with a population density of 2,798 people per km^{2}.

Historical population
Year	Pop.	±% p.a.
2006	2,301	—
2013	2,295	−0.04%
2018	2,583	+2.39%
2023	2,745	+1.22%

Elgin had a population of 2,745 in the 2023 New Zealand census, an increase of 162 people (6.3%) since the 2018 census, and an increase of 450 people (19.6%) since the 2013 census. There were 1,401 males, 1,335 females, and 12 people of other genders in 855 dwellings. 2.6% of people identified as LGBTIQ+. The median age was 32.6 years (compared with 38.1 years nationally). There were 660 people (24.0%) aged under 15 years, 621 (22.6%) aged 15 to 29, 1,110 (40.4%) aged 30 to 64, and 357 (13.0%) aged 65 or older.

People could identify as more than one ethnicity. The results were 42.3% European (Pākehā); 67.8% Māori; 9.1% Pasifika; 3.3% Asian; 1.0% Middle Eastern, Latin American and African New Zealanders (MELAA); and 0.9% other, which includes people giving their ethnicity as "New Zealander". English was spoken by 95.8%, Māori by 18.9%, Samoan by 0.3%, and other languages by 5.6%. No language could be spoken by 2.1% (e.g. too young to talk). New Zealand Sign Language was known by 0.7%. The percentage of people born overseas was 9.7, compared with 28.8% nationally.

Religious affiliations were 31.7% Christian, 0.1% Hindu, 0.1% Islam, 5.7% Māori religious beliefs, 0.3% Buddhist, 0.8% New Age, and 0.9% other religions. People who answered that they had no religion were 51.3%, and 9.4% of people did not answer the census question.

Of those at least 15 years old, 201 (9.6%) people had a bachelor's or higher degree, 1,206 (57.8%) had a post-high school certificate or diploma, and 684 (32.8%) people exclusively held high school qualifications. The median income was $32,600, compared with $41,500 nationally. 57 people (2.7%) earned over $100,000 compared to 12.1% nationally. The employment status of those at least 15 was 942 (45.2%) full-time, 249 (11.9%) part-time, and 132 (6.3%) unemployed.

== Parks ==
The Reynolds Creek Reserve and Sandown Park is a local park which allows dogs on leashes.

== Education ==
Elgin School is a co-educational Year 1-6 state primary school with a roll of 41 as of July 2025. It opened in 1954.

Cobham School was a Year 1-6 state primary school which opened in 1962 and closed in 2025 due to low student numbers and a high staff turnover.
