= Awapuni =

Awapuni is the name of three distinct places in New Zealand:

- Awapuni, Gisborne is a suburb of Gisborne city
- Awapuni, Palmerston North is a suburb of Palmerston North city
- Awapuni, Wellington is a suburb of Lower Hutt city
