= Moutohora Branch =

Branch line railway in New Zealand

Map

The Moutohora Branch was a branch line railway that formed part of New Zealand's national rail network in Poverty Bay in the North Island of New Zealand. The branch ran for 78 km approximately North-West from Gisborne into the rugged and steep Raukumara Range to the terminus at Moutohora. Construction started in 1900, and the line was opened to Moutohora on 26 November 1917.

Built to the New Zealand standard 3 ft 6 in (1,067 mm) gauge the line was originally intended to become part of a railway to Auckland via Rotorua, and later as part of an East Coast Main Trunk Railway running from Gisborne to Pokeno by way of Ōpōtiki, Taneatua, Tauranga, and Paeroa. This comprehensive scheme never came to pass, and the branch line it subsequently became was closed on 24 March 1959.

The branch had four names during its lifetime. Initially, it was authorised as a Gisborne to Rotorua line and labelled as such in the Public Works Statement until 1910. From then, while isolated from the rest of the NZR system, it was known as the Gisborne section (later the Palmerston North–Gisborne Line) of the NZR. Once Gisborne was linked to the rest of the NZR network in 1942 the line became the Motohora Branch, to be renamed the Moutohora Branch on 16 November 1950, when the New Zealand Geographic Board decided on this spelling for the line's terminal locality.

== Construction ==
The first report on proposals to link Gisborne and the rest of Poverty Bay to the outside world by rail was made in 1886, but nothing eventuated at that time. In April 1897 the East Coast Railway League was established to press for the development of rail connections, and in 1899 the Government announced that Gisborne was to be connected to Auckland by a line of rail. Work on the line started in early 1900. On 14 January the then Minister for Railways, the Joseph Ward, turned the first sod. The first 20 kilometres (12 mi) of the line ran across coastal plains with few obstacles, and the line was opened to Kaitaratahi on 10 November 1902. A Gisborne-Rotorua line from Makaraka to Mōtū of about 37 miles (60 km) was authorised by the Railways Authorisation Act, 1904. An eventual connection to the Rotorua Branch disappeared after a 1911 survey to connect the "Gisborne Section" with the East Coast Main Trunk.

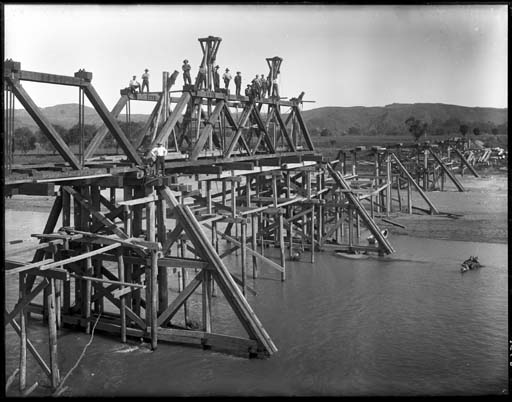
Waipaoa Bridge being built at Kaitaratahi in 1903. It had 6 spans of 80 ft (24 m) and 4 of 20 ft (6.1 m)

Once past this point the line required large river bridging works, four tunnels, heavy earthworks and the construction of two large viaducts 18 and 30 metres high; in 1910 Massey Bros (Auckland engineers from 1901 to 1913) won a £3,002 contract for steel girders for the Gisborne-Rotorua Railway on the Otoko to Rakauroa section. Much of the line was built on steep grades of up to 1 in 30, and many tight curves were required. Despite all earthworks being carried out by pick and shovel, and although hindered at times by floods, washouts and landslips and (in the later stages) a wartime shortage of materials, progress continued at a slow but steady pace, and the line was opened to Moutohora at 78.5 km by 26 November 1917. The line was opened by the Hon William MacDonald in 1917; the first stage of the original project to connect Gisborne with Rotorua but it was likely to be the terminus for some years to come.

Once at Moutohora, even though over the main divide, there was no easy way for the railway to link up with the rest of the NZR network, as a definitive line for a connection to the Bay of Plenty had never been identified. By 1920, 13 separate surveys had sought a practical route, but the expensive nature of the works required to provide a descent to the Bay of Plenty always deterred politicians from authorising any further extension of the line. In his annual report to parliament in 1916, the Minister of Public Works, William Fraser stated "Construction beyond the Kowhai Road [Moutuhora] Station cannot be put in hand until the route of the mainline towards the Bay of Plenty is definitely located." With the completion of the branch to Moutohora in 1917, construction workers were almost immediately transferred from Moutohora to Ngatapa to continue work on the line south. In 1924, with the Napier – Wairoa section of the Palmerston North – Gisborne Line was under construction and a short section between Wairoa and Waikokopu had been completed; it was decided that year to extend the line from Waikokopu to Gisborne via the coast rather than the longer inland route to Ngatapa. With the passing of time it became clear that Gisborne would be connected to the rest of the NZR system via this coastal route. This line south was finally completed and opened for traffic in 1942.

There was briefly interest in reviving a connection when the East Coast Main Trunk reached Taneatua in 1928. A new survey was undertaken by local surveying firm Grant and Cooke, proposing the new line leave the branch south of Matawai, crossing a saddle near Te Wera and then following the Koranga and Wairata streams to the Waioeka Valley down to the Bay of Plenty via Opotiki, and then on to Taneatua. The Great Depression following the Wall Street crash of 1929 saw this scheme shelved. A similar route in the Koranga Stream/River and Waioweka River valleys to Ōpōtiki was surveyed in 1947.

== Operations ==
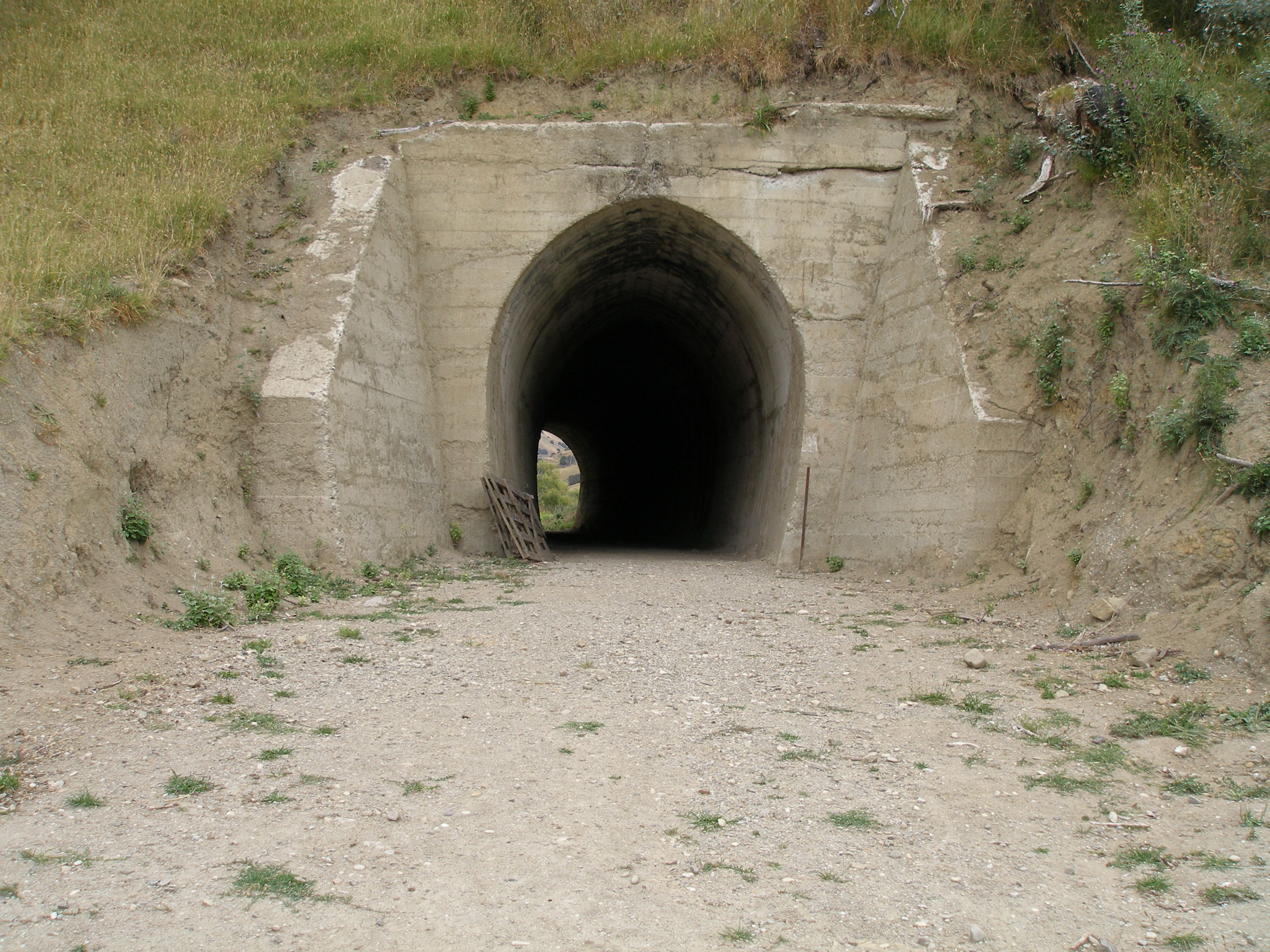
The 45m curved tunnel 3 on the abandoned Moutohora branch is now part of the Otoko walkway.

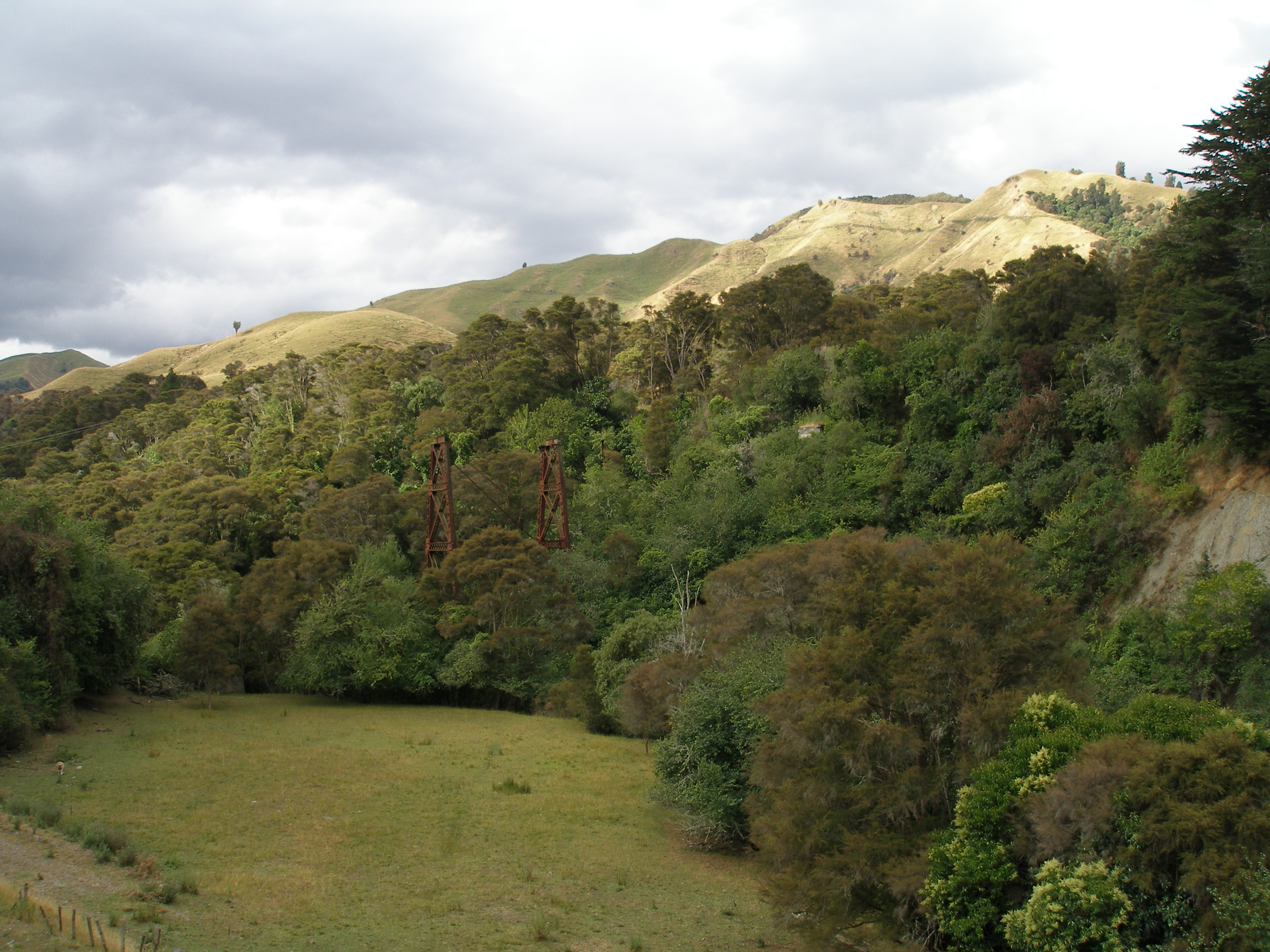
One of the steel pylons that carried the Otoko viaduct remains in situ.

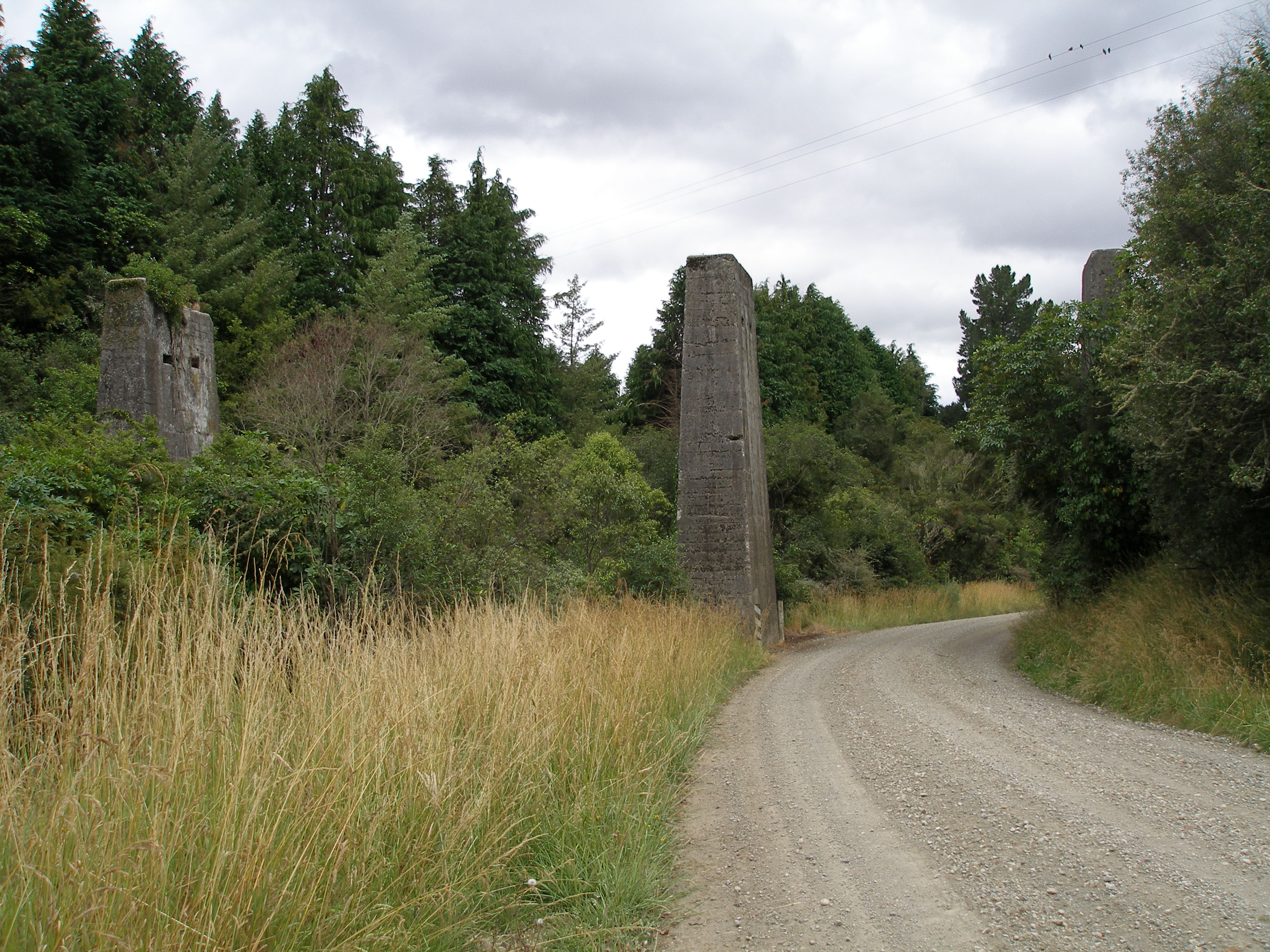
These concrete pylons carried the Rakauora viaduct across the river immediately before the Rakauora station.

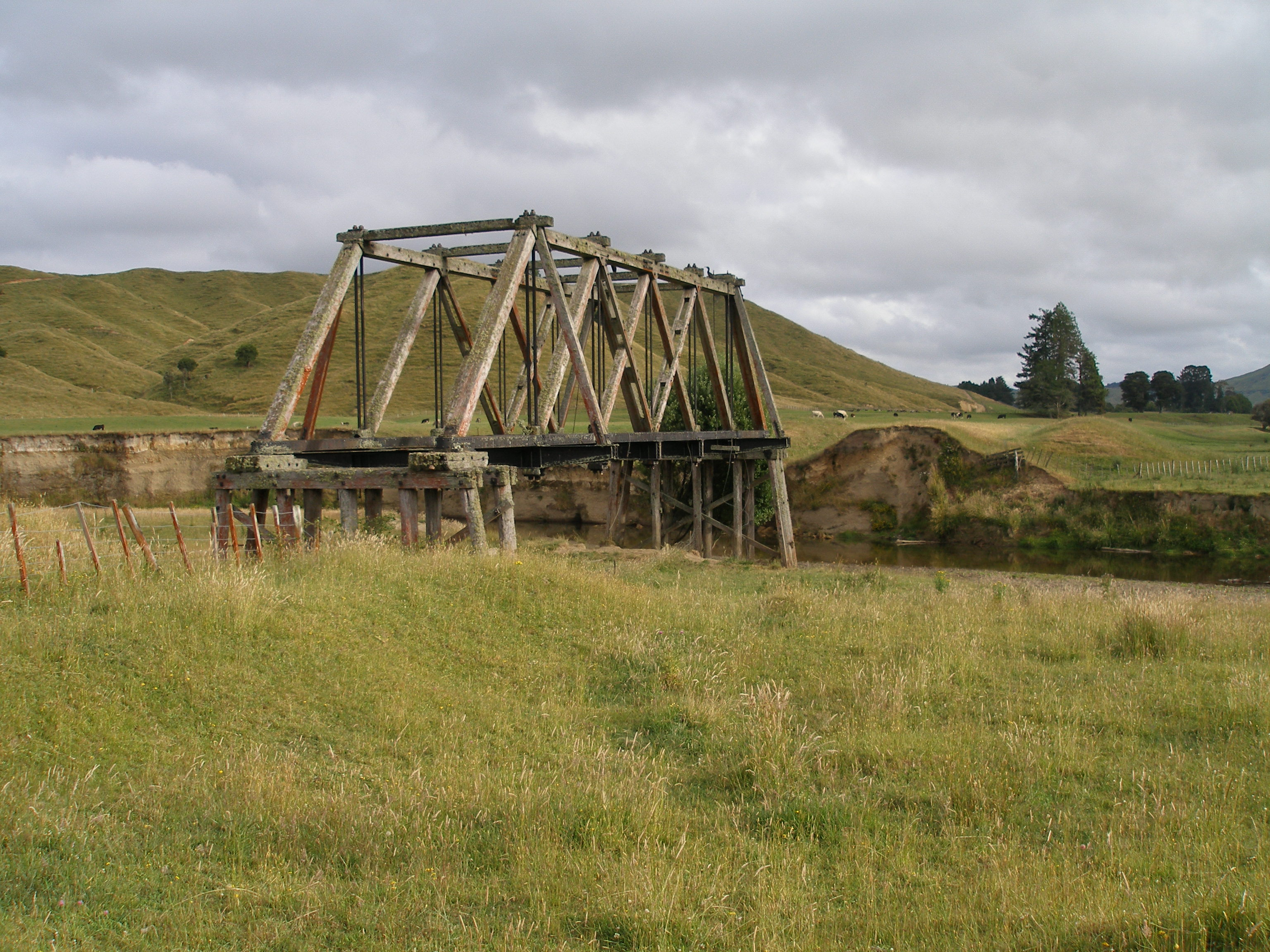
The Motu river bridge truss remains in place at 38°17′31.89″S 177°31′29.7″E.

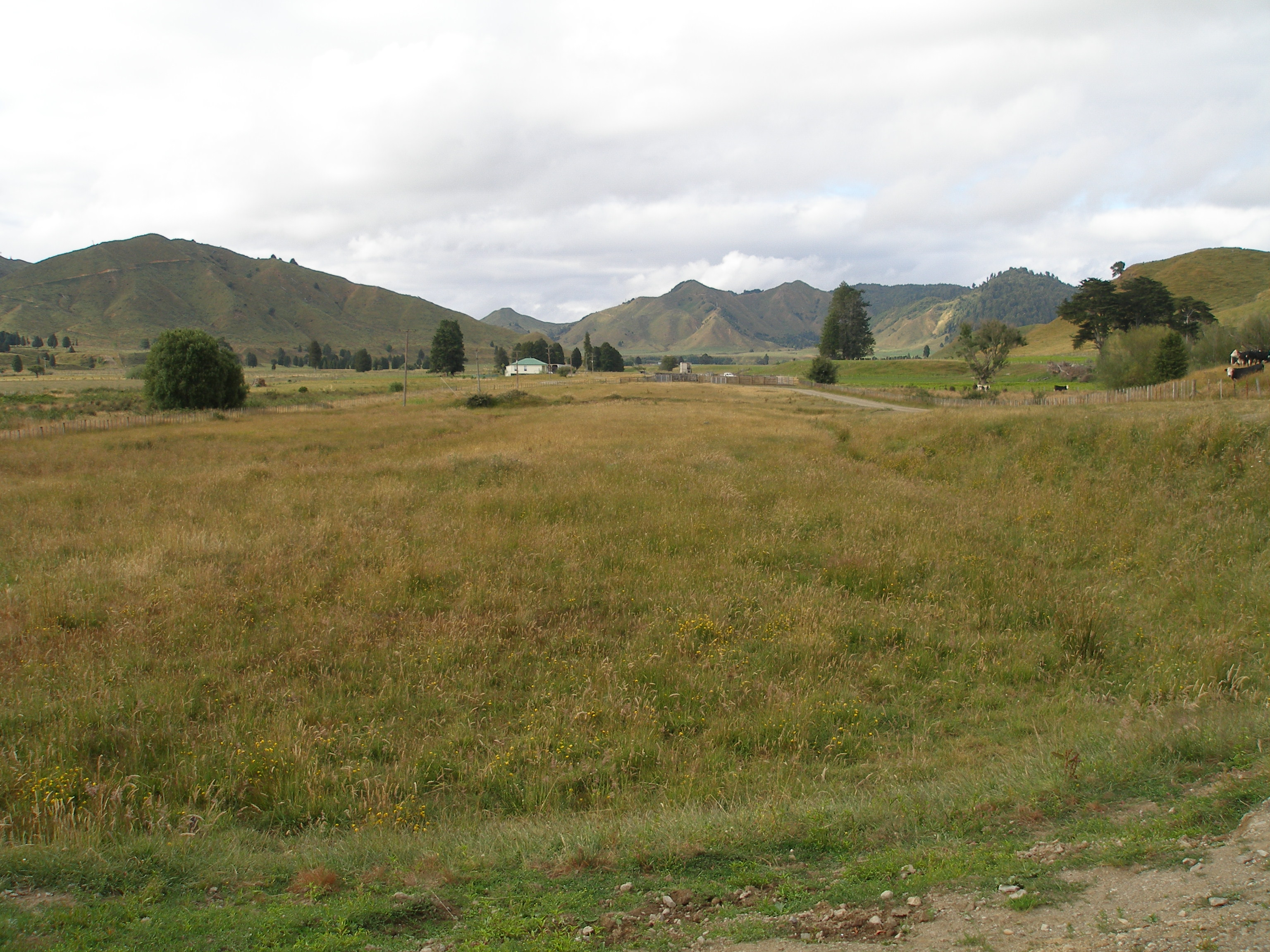
A modern house and a stockyard occupy part of the area which was once the Moutohora terminus and railyard. All the cleared land in this image was heavy bush before the railway arrived.

Until connected with the Palmerston North – Gisborne Line in 1942 the Moutohora branch served a purely local function in maintaining access to Gisborne's hinterland. The line had heavy traffic in its early years and consistently showed an operating profit In the 12 months between April 1903 and March 1904, when only about 21 km of line were open, the approximately 6,500 people in the district made 47,706 single or return passenger journeys, and 4,464 tonnes of freight were carried.

In 1919–1920, with the full length of the line in operation, over 30,000 tonnes of freight were carried. Road metal from a quarry at Moutohora accounted for 16,400 tonnes of the 1919-1920 total, and continued to be a major component of all freight traffic in following years. Much of the rest of the 1919-1920 freight was timber cut from the extensive forests to which the line provided access. In the same year over 113,000 passenger journeys were recorded, the passenger traffic being sufficient to support a privately leased refreshment room at Te Karaka station. Apart from occasional passenger excursion trains all trains were mixed, carrying both passengers and freight.

By 1930 most of the economically accessible timber had been cut out and sawmills along the line began closing down. Road metal and livestock continued to provide reasonably large tonnages, but with the onset of the depression both passenger and freight operations fell away, with only a small fraction of the district's primary produce being exported. From 18 May 1931 the train service was reduced to one train a day in each direction.

Even when economic conditions improved rail traffic did not recover to pre-depression levels until the imposition of road traffic restrictions and petrol rationing during the 1939-1945 war years. In August 1942 the Moutohora branch was connected to the rest of the NZR network via the Palmerston North – Gisborne Line, causing a temporary increase to nearly 70,000 passenger journeys on the branch in the 1942-1943 year. After 1944, and the partial easing of some road transport restrictions, passenger numbers and freight fell away dramatically. Because of the combination of reduced passenger numbers and wartime coal shortages, passenger services were withdrawn from the branch on 29 January 1945. They were replaced by a 24-seat New Zealand Railways Road Services bus.

== Motive power and train working ==
For the first seven years from 1902 two D class 2-4-0T locomotives provided all the motive power required for both construction and running services. In 1909 they were supplemented by an F^{A} class 0-6-2T, and in 1910 the first of six W^{A} class 2-6-2T engines arrived, with the two D class locomotives being shipped away at about the same time. As the F^{A} class locos aged they were themselves replaced by W^{W} class 4-6-4Ts and B^{B} class 4-8-0 locomotives. Finally in 1952 A^{B} class 4-6-2 Pacifics were introduced. The large tender on the A^{B}s limited visibility when running backwards, so to ensure the line could be worked safely by these more powerful engines NZR installed a turning triangle at Moutohora station. Previous to this all engines had run smokebox first towards Moutohora and bunker first on their return.

Despite the heavy gradients train working was not as difficult as may have been expected. Most of the uphill traffic comprised empty wagons being sent to transport the district's primary produce back to Gisborne. The heavy downhill trains required more braking power than tractive effort, and special train management rules were in place to ensure a safe descent into Poverty Bay.

== Closure ==
As freight volumes continued to decrease the viability of the branch came into question, particularly as it was now clear the connection with the Bay of Plenty would never be made. In 1952 a Royal Commission was appointed to look into the profitability of branch lines, including the Moutohora branch. The Commission sanctioned the retention of the branch for the time being, but made it clear to the local citizens that it was a case of "use it or lose it."

The development of aerial topdressing led to a short-term increase in freight traffic towards the middle of 1952, as large volumes of superphosphate were required in the district. This did not last and after lingering on for a few more years the end came in 1959, by which time keeping the line open cost more than three times its annual revenue. Despite the activities of a Railway Promotion League persisting into the 1950s to have the line extended to Taneatua, the branch officially closed on 14 March 1959. The last working train ran a month later, on 14 April, bringing out a final load of road metal for highway improvements that would use the railway alignment once the rails had been lifted.

== Today ==
Five kilometres of the Moutohora branch remain vacant to Makaraka, as the industrial siding to service a fruit storehouse closed in the late 80s. Many remains of the embankments, cuttings, bridge abutments and tunnels can be seen from State Highway 2 from near Ormond to Matawai. About 5 km of the old roadbed is now the Otoko recreational walkway. Just past the northern end of the walkway, the abutments and one of the steel piers of the 30m high Otoko viaduct are clearly visible to the east of the highway. Between Otoko and Rakauroa the current highway runs largely on the old railway alignment, and the piers of the Rakauroa viaduct still stand about 100m to the west of the highway just before reaching Rakauroa. The Matawai station platform edge can be seen alongside the Matawai-Moutohora road, and the Motu river bridge truss remains in situ. Some railway buildings remain at various places up and down the old line, but there are now no railway remains left at the site of the Moutohora terminus.

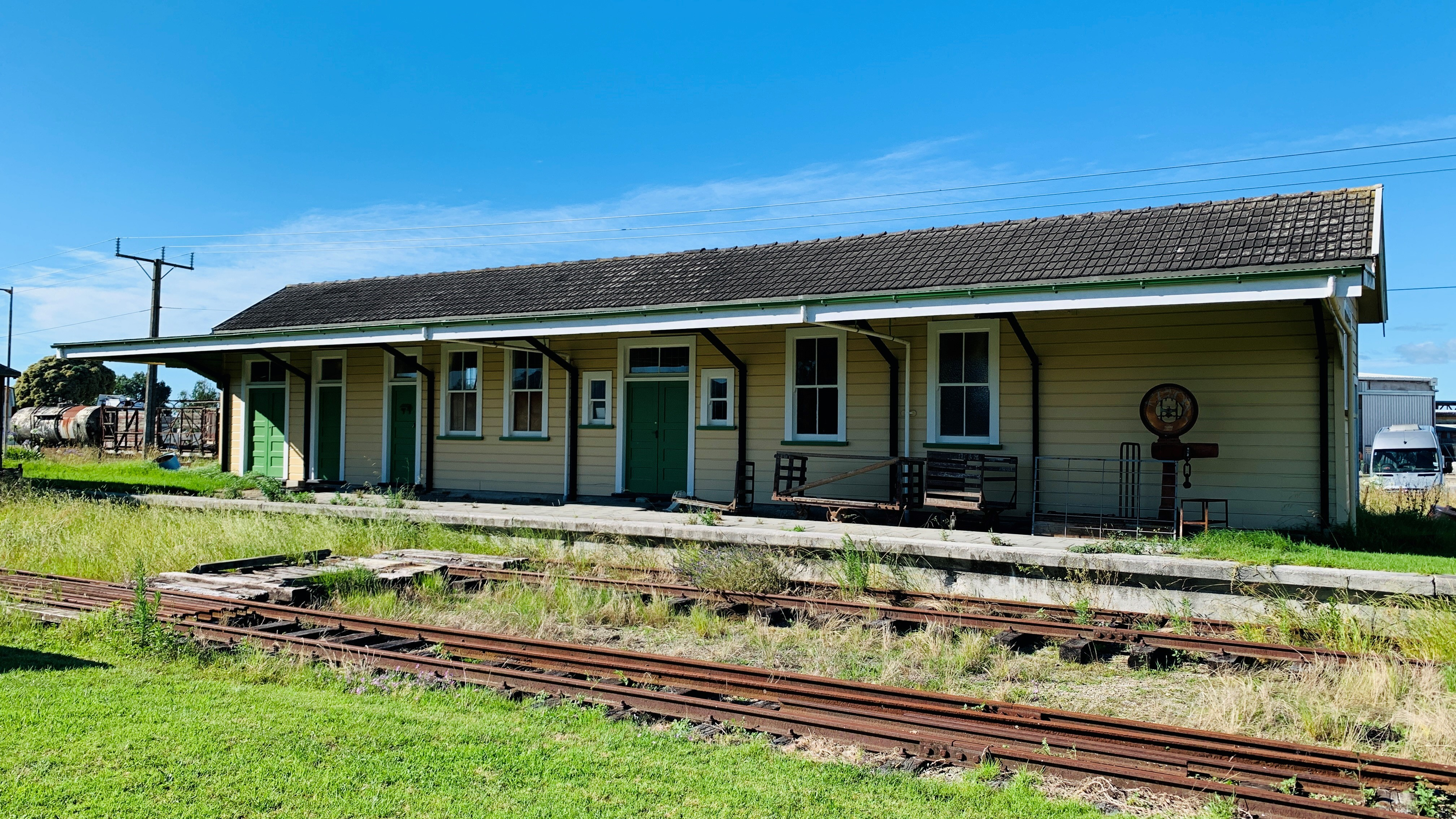
Matawhero station building at Makaraka in 2021

The East Coast Museum of Technology is the current terminus of what it left of the Gisborne to Moutohora Branch Line, with plans to restore the Makaraka section and run services with GCVR and ECMoT's own Locomotives.

Locomotive D 143, one of the two D class locomotives to work on the line in the first few years, has survived and is now in preservation at the Silver Stream Heritage Railway at Silverstream in the Hutt Valley near Wellington.

Locomotive W^{A} 165, which arrived in 1911 to work the Gisborne section (as it was then) has also survived in preservation. Now owned by the Gisborne City Vintage Railway Incorporated, it has been returned to running order and is regularly steamed to provide excursions.

== See also ==
- Palmerston North–Gisborne Line
- Ahuriri / Napier Port Branch
- Ngatapa Branch
