= Ahuriri Branch =

Railway branch line in New Zealand

Map

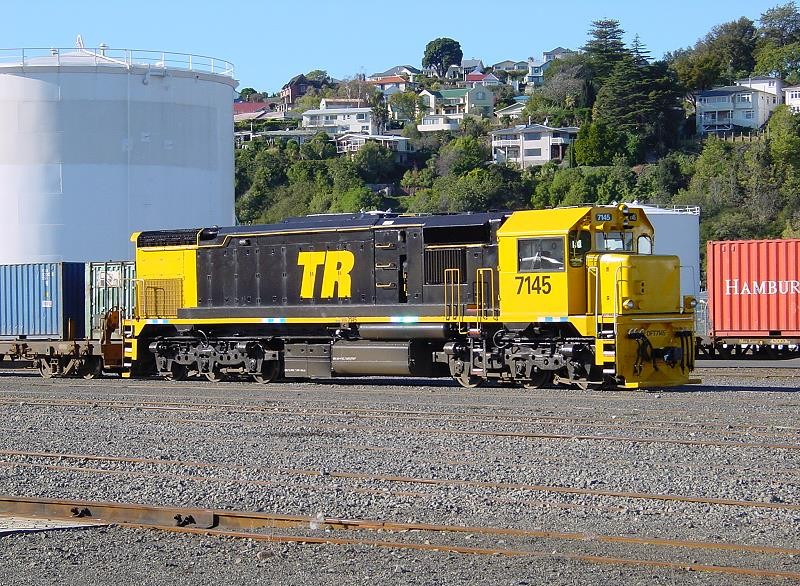
DFT7145 in Ahuriri Yard, 2003

The Ahuriri Branch, now named the Napier Port Branch, is a 2 km railway branch line off the Palmerston North–Gisborne Line, in Napier, New Zealand. The branch serves the Port of Napier.

Ahuriri by the Inner Harbour, originally called Spit, was the original port of Napier, and a 3 km line from Napier was opened on 25 November 1874, just a month after the opening of the line to Hastings. Passenger services were run on the line until 1908. The 1931 Hawke's Bay earthquake uplifted the area by about 2.5 metres, and the port was transferred to Breakwater, northeast of Bluff Hill. The Napier Harbour Board built a 2.4 km line from Ahuriri to Breakwater, which they operated with two Fowler 0-4-0 tank engines. This line was transferred to the NZR in 1957.

With the redevelopment of the Napier Railway Station in 1989–1991 most of the Napier railways facilities were transferred to Pandora Point at the beginning of the Port Branch and the old stockyard at the end of the branch closed. Pandora Point now has a marshalling yard, freight terminal, locomotive depot, and a triangle giving direct access north and south from the port branch. The old main line north to Gisborne was realigned to the east to allow a new link road to the Tamatea area of Napier, and railways land redeveloped as an industrial subdivision.

== See also ==
- Palmerston North–Gisborne Line
- Moutohora Branch
- Nagtapa Branch
