= Palmerston North–Gisborne Line =

Railway line in New Zealand

Map

The Palmerston North–Gisborne Line (PNGL) is a secondary main line railway in the North Island of New Zealand. It branches from the North Island Main Trunk at Palmerston North and runs east through the Manawatū Gorge to Woodville, where it meets the Wairarapa Line, and then proceeds to Hastings and Napier in Hawke's Bay before following the coast north to Gisborne. Construction began in 1872, but the entire line was not completed until 1942. The line crosses the runway of Gisborne Airport, one of the world's few railways to do so since Pakistan's Khyber Pass Railway closed.

In conjunction with the Moutohora Branch that ran north from Gisborne between 1900 and 1959, the line was originally intended to connect to the East Coast Main Trunk, described in 1875 as the North Island trunk line, but the difficult inland section between the Tāneatua Branch in the Bay of Plenty and the Moutohora Branch was never completed.

The line has not carried scheduled passenger trains since October 2001, when the Bay Express service was cancelled. The northern portion of the line, from Napier to Gisborne, is currently inoperative due to damage from Cyclone Gabrielle in 2023. The section was mothballed north of Wairoa due to four significant washouts during a storm in March 2012. The whole Napier–Gisborne section was officially mothballed (but not closed) in December 2012. The Napier–Wairoa section reopened for forestry traffic in June 2019, but has been mothballed again following Cyclone Gabrielle in 2023. The section between Wairoa and Gisborne has suffered from further slips and washouts since 2012. The Gisborne City Vintage Railway has a lease agreement over the Gisborne to Muriwai section of the line, which it uses for its seasonal vintage trains, while the section between Nuhaka and Kopuawhara is leased to a rail bike operation.

== Construction ==
The PNGL was constructed in two distinct phases. The southern portion between Napier and Palmerston North was built between 1872 and 1891, while the northern portion from Napier to Gisborne followed at a much later date, 1912 to 1942.

=== Palmerston North – Napier section ===
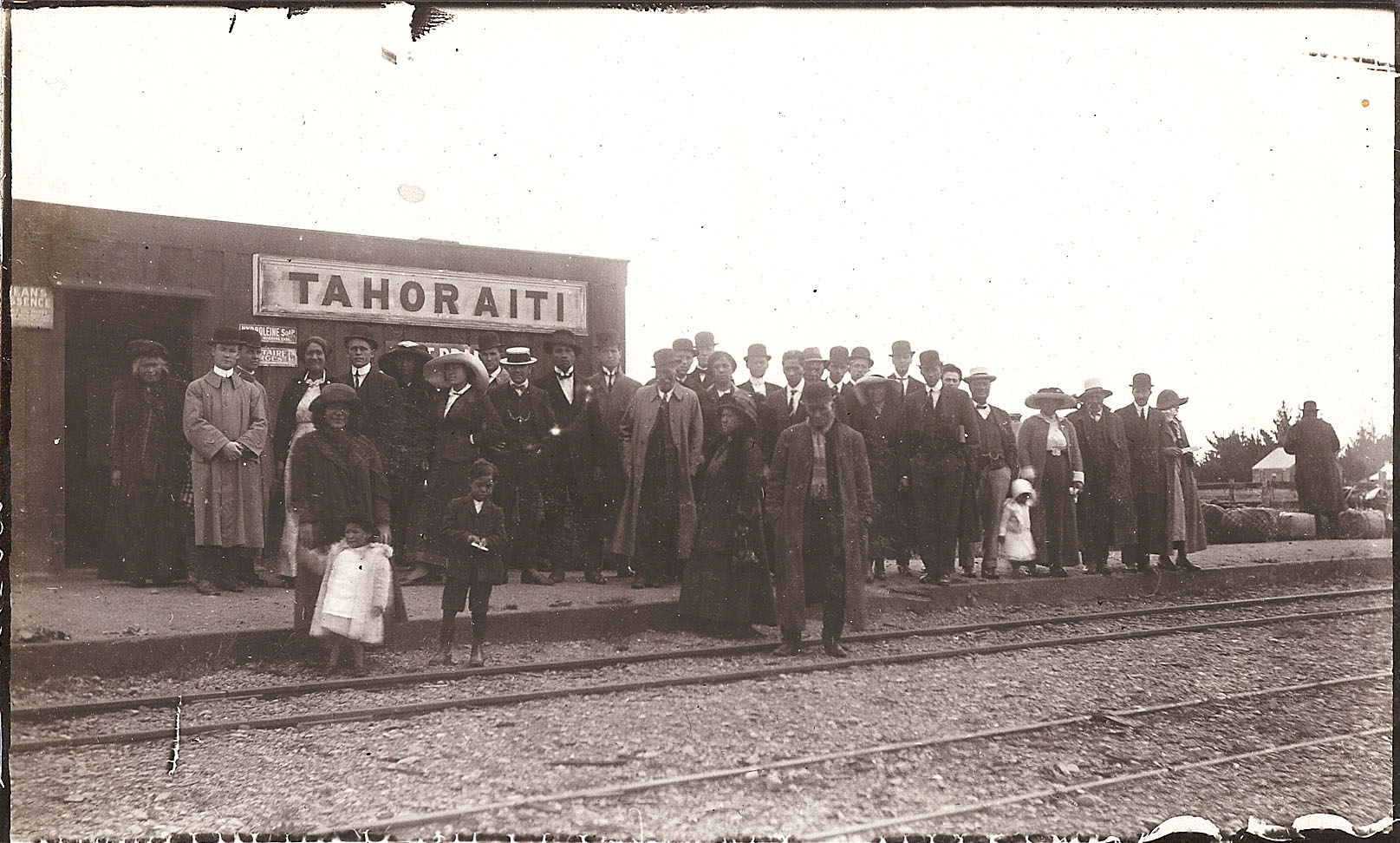
Tahoraiti railway station in 1912, south of Dannevirke.

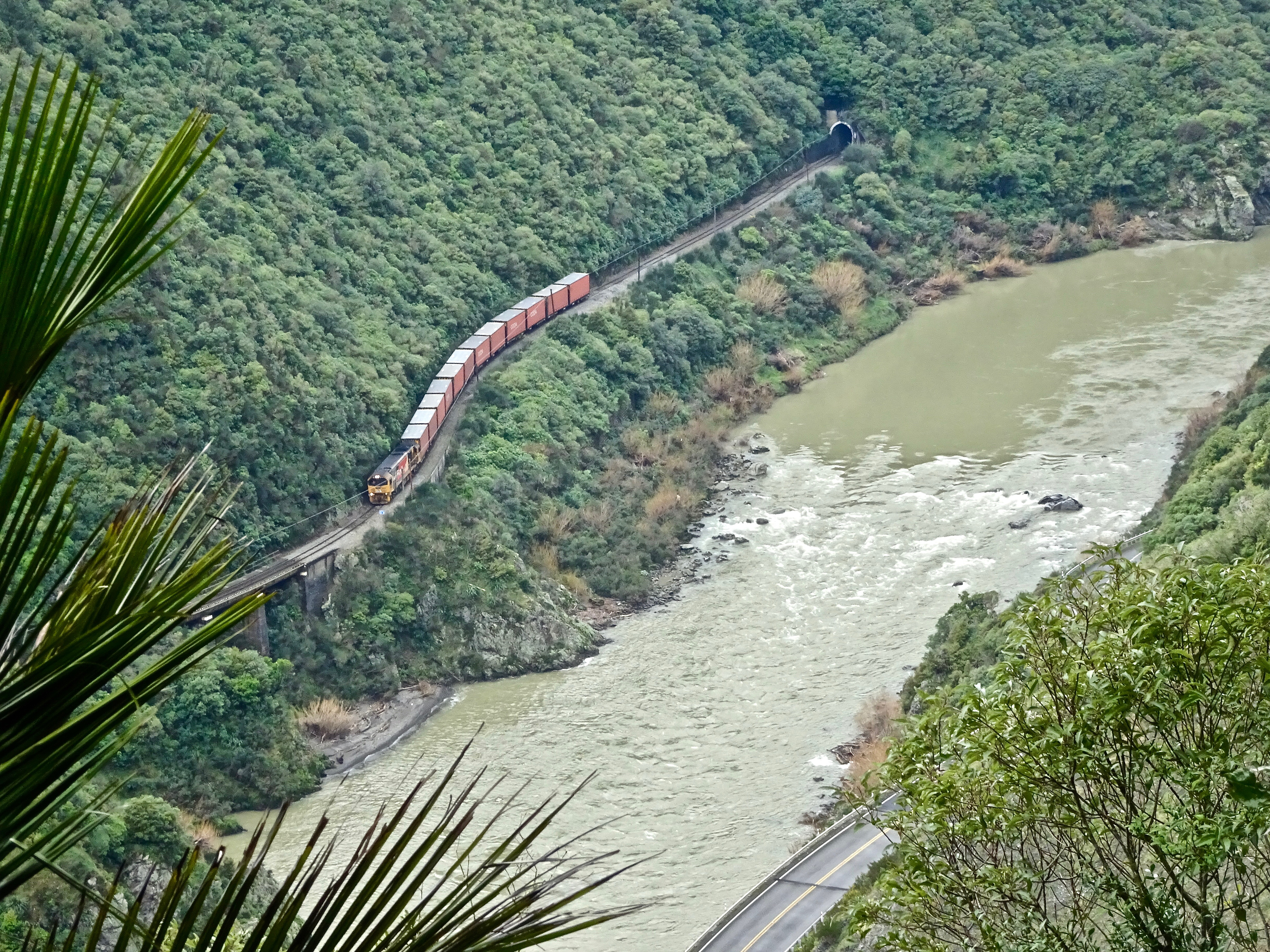
Westbound train on the Manawatū Gorge, viewed from the White Horse Rapids lookout.

Hawke's Bay featured in Julius Vogel's "Great Public Works" scheme of 1870 to create a cohesive national transport network, and in 1871, a line south from Napier was officially authorised. Construction commenced in 1872 and the first section opened to Hastings on 13 October 1874; from Napier's railway station, it followed a coastal shingle ridge to Clive, and then turned inland. From Hastings, the line proceeded inland through the initially easy country but became steadily more difficult. It was thickly wooded at the time and the upper reaches and tributaries of the Manawatū River provided engineering difficulties. The line opened to Pakipaki on 1 January 1875; Te Aute on 17 February 1876; Waipawa on 28 August 1876 and Waipukurau three days later on 1 September 1876. Takapau followed on 12 March 1877, then Kopua on 25 January 1878 for a total of 103 km of railway built in six years.

Construction slowed from this stage due both to the terrain and the beginning of the Long Depression. The next section, from Kopua to Makotuku, featured two viaducts; the 920 ft (280 m) long, 128 ft (39 m) high Ormondville viaduct and the 420 ft (130 m) long, 85 ft (26 m) high Makotuku viaduct. It opened on 9 August 1880. It was nearly four years until the next section, 7 km to Matamau, opened on 23 June 1884. On 1 December 1884, the major centre of Dannevirke was reached. Beyond Dannevirke, the terrain became somewhat easier and the line reached Woodville at the eastern end of the Manawatū Gorge on 22 March 1887. However, work from the Palmerston North end had not begun until 1886, and due to significant engineering troubles associated with the Manawatū Gorge, the line was not completed until 9 March 1891. Upon completion, a direct route between Napier and Wellington was established but required a change of trains in Longburn with the Wellington and Manawatu Railway Company. On 11 December 1897, the Wairarapa Line was completed through to Woodville and this provided a through NZR connection from Wellington to Hawke's Bay, via the Rimutaka Incline.

=== Napier – Gisborne section ===
Due to the isolation of Gisborne, a railway link to other centres was not initially given serious consideration. By 1900, a Railway League had been formed to pressure the government into building two lines, one via Rotorua to Auckland and another to Napier and thus Wellington. Gisborne's first railway, the initial portion of what became the Moutohora Branch, opened to the north in 1902. In 1910 a route south was approved, though the Opposition said it wouldn't pay and voted against it. This was proposed to follow an inland route to the Wairoa River, which would then be followed to the town of Wairoa before proceeding along the coastline to Napier. Work began in April 1911, and the first 18 kilometres (11 mi) to Ngatapa was essentially complete by December 1914. The economic impacts of World War I led to the suspension of construction beyond Ngatapa towards Waikura, and it did not recommence until 1920 after further surveying was undertaken. This work may have included some tunneling but no trace of this exists today.

Work also recommenced at the other end of the inland line in 1919, with about 20 men, later 54, working at Frasertown in 1920, though hampered by concrete shortages. Alternative routes, including the coastal route, were surveyed in 1923. As late as 1934 the partly-built Wairoa to Frasertown line was shown on the map, after which it became a stock road and then Wairoa aerodrome.

In 1920, work began on a short isolated branch from Wairoa to the port of Waikokopu; it was completed in 1924 and was built initially to ship meat from a freezing works in Wairoa. In 1924, an engineer's report recommended this branch be incorporated as the southernmost portion of a new coastal route from Wairoa to Gisborne. The Public Works Department (PWD) accordingly abandoned the inland Ngatapa route and began work on the coastal route. At this time, the route from Napier to Wairoa was also under construction. The first sod had been turned in Napier in 1912, but delays meant the line was not opened to Eskdale by the PWD until December 1922 and handed over to the New Zealand Railways Department (NZR) on 23 July 1923. The next section, to Putorino, was handed over to NZR on 6 October 1930.

At this point, the construction of the line was plagued by natural disasters and a lack of money and government will to complete the project. The Great Depression following the Wall Street crash of 1929 led to a temporary halt to the entire project. In January 1931 all the workers on the project were dismissed. In February that year the Hawke's Bay earthquake resulted in the closure of the completed Napier – Putorino section. Despite the closure of the completed section, work recommenced on the line after the earthquake, and by September, all that was required to complete the Napier to Wairoa section was one tunnel, one viaduct (Matahorua Viaduct), and 13 kilometres (8.1 mi) of track. Due to the toll of the earthquake and the Great Depression, the government recommended that work cease and the line be abandoned. The line remained in place for the next four years with no work occurring on its completion, gradually deteriorating. A petition of 8,000 signatures to recommence construction of the line was presented to parliament, and in the November 1931 New Zealand general election, Gisborne MP Douglas Lysnar lost his seat to Labour candidate David Coleman on Labour's promise to recommence construction. There was briefly a proposal for a private company to take over construction and operation of the line in 1933. The proposal continued until a new government, the first Labour government, was elected in November 1935. In early 1936, the new Minister of Public Works Bob Semple ordered the recommencement of work on the line. This led to the Napier – Putorino section being reopened on 17 October 1936. On 1 July 1937, the 275 metres (902 ft) long Mohaka Viaduct was completed; at 97 metres (318 ft) high, it is New Zealand's highest viaduct. The full line from Napier to Wairoa and Waikokopu opened on 23 August 1937.

Severe flooding in February 1938 forced the closure of the entire line beyond Putorino and killed 21 construction workers on the final stage between Waikokopu and Gisborne in the Kopuawhara disaster. The line was restored to operational standards by December 1938 and transferred from the PWD to NZR on 1 July 1939.

Work persisted on the final section from Waikokopu to Gisborne through World War II and the final stage was completed in 1942. The PWD was able to operate freight trains through to Gisborne from 3 August 1942, passengers were carried from 7 September 1942, and the complete PNGL passed into NZR ownership on 1 February 1943.

== East Coast Main Trunk connection ==
The original intention of the Moutohora Branch was to connect Gisborne with Auckland via Rotorua. As the East Coast Main Trunk (ECMT) extended into the Bay of Plenty, surveys focused on connecting the Moutohora branch with ECMT. A 1928 survey proposed a route from Matawai to reach the ECMT railhead at Taneatua via Ōpōtiki. This scheme was shelved in 1931 (along with the construction of the Napier – Gisborne section) due to the Great Depression. Following the election of the first Labour government in 1935, Bob Semple promised work on the Moutohora – Taneatua section would commence once men and equipment were available. Prior to the 1938 New Zealand general election a new work camp and workshops were established at Taneatua, and pegging parties began to mark out the route from Taneatua to Ōpōtiki. This work came to an abrupt end in the weeks following the general election. In 1939 £45,000 was provided for extension from Taneatua to Ōpōtiki and a route pegged out as far as a proposed Waimana railway station. The outbreak of the Second World War in September 1939 ensured the Government had a justification for not bringing the project to a halt, while promising that the halt was only temporary.

With the completion of the Napier – Gisborne section in 1943, further delegations were made by Gisborne business interests to complete the Moutohora – Taneatua section. Semple promised these delegations that work would recommence following the end of hostilities. By late 1946, no further work had been undertaken; in 1947 a further promise was made of an "early connection" following a strong showing for the opposition at the 1946 New Zealand general election. A route was surveyed in 1947, leaving the Moutohora Branch just before Mātāwai, and running in the Koranga Stream/River and Waioweka River valleys to Ōpōtiki. In 1948 Semple retrenched his position, claiming that he had only ever promised an investigation of the route. With the change in government following the 1949 New Zealand general election, a further delegation from Gisborne presented to new Minister of Works Stan Goosman (who was also Minister of Railways) a case for completing the link. Goosman would not make any commitment to the project, and pointed to a new highway parliament had authorised between Ōpōtiki and Gisborne as an alternative to the rail link. Following this response, local Gisborne interests realised that the battle was lost. Moutohora was to remain a branch line, which closed in 1959. The ECMT was redefined in 1978 as Hamilton – Kawerau, leaving Taneatua as a branch, eventually being closed to traffic in 2001.

== Operation ==
=== Passenger services ===
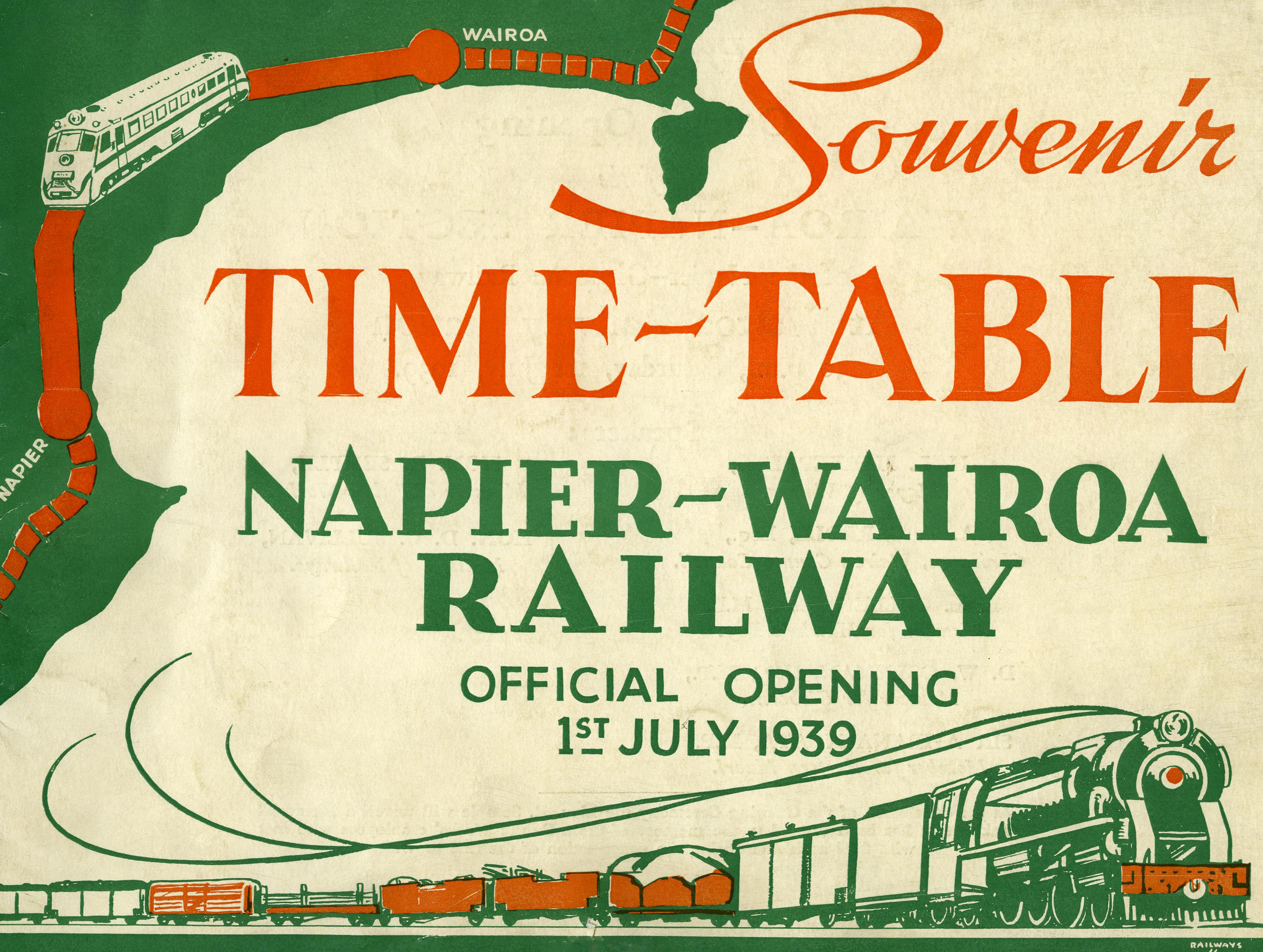
Napier-Wairoa Souvenir Timetable 1939

Until the completion of the line from Napier to Palmerston North, passengers were catered for solely by slow mixed trains that also conveyed goods. Once the link with the WMR was established, the earliest incarnation of the Napier Express began operating. It first required a change of trains at Longburn, then, when the Wairarapa Line opened, it operated directly through to Wellington. Difficulties associated with the Rimutaka Incline meant the journey via the Wairarapa actually took over an hour longer than the west coast route of the WMR, and once the WMR's route was incorporated into the NZR network, the Napier Express was re-routed to the west coast, with the Wairarapa Mail providing a connection from Woodville with towns in the Wairarapa. While the Express ran through the Wairarapa, W^{A} class locomotives hauled a feeder service between Palmerston North and Woodville.

Following a trial run in 1938, NZR RM class Standard railcars began operating a service between Napier and Wairoa on 3 July 1939, and when the line to Gisborne was completed, the Gisborne Express was introduced on 7 September 1942, running from Wellington through to Gisborne. This service typically operated twice-weekly except for holiday periods when it was more frequent, but it ceased to operate in 1955 and was replaced by more efficient railcars except for occasional reinstatement during holiday periods to cater for heavy loads. By this time, railcars had already replaced the Napier Express; in 1954, the daily express was replaced by twice-daily services run initially by Standard railcars and then by 88 seaters. This markedly quickened the journey from Napier to Wellington from 7 hours to 5.5 hours. The railcars entered into service to Gisborne on 1 August 1955 and also ran twice daily; one return service terminated in Napier while one went through to Wellington. To augment the express trains and railcars, numerous other mixed trains and local passenger services also once operated on the PNGL between various destinations, including intermediate termini such as Waipukurau, but these had all ceased by the 1960s.

In 1968 and 1971, cuts were made to the services as the railcars wore out, and on 6 November 1972, they were cancelled entirely on the Wellington to Napier run and replaced by the Endeavour, which was modelled on the successful Southerner. Railcars survived on the run through to Gisborne until 30 May 1976, when they were replaced by an extension of the Endeavour. It ran once daily in each direction, but its quality gradually declined during the 1980s as the rolling stock was reallocated to other trains; this included the removal of a buffet car, necessitating lengthy refreshment stops in Napier and Palmerston North. On 8 March 1988, Cyclone Bola significantly damaged the line between Napier and Gisborne, resulting in the truncation of passenger services to Napier. Passenger services never ran beyond Napier in regular service again.

On 11 December 1989, the Endeavour was replaced by the Bay Express. This train restored the standards of the original 1972 Endeavour, and it operated throughout the 1990s. Declining patronage and an unwillingness on the part of Tranz Scenic to replace the decades-old rolling stock meant that the Bay Express was cancelled from 7 October 2001. Since this time, the PNGL has been entirely freight only. In 2017 a report said one of the restrictions was a 70 km/h (43 mph) on the whole line.

=== Freight ===
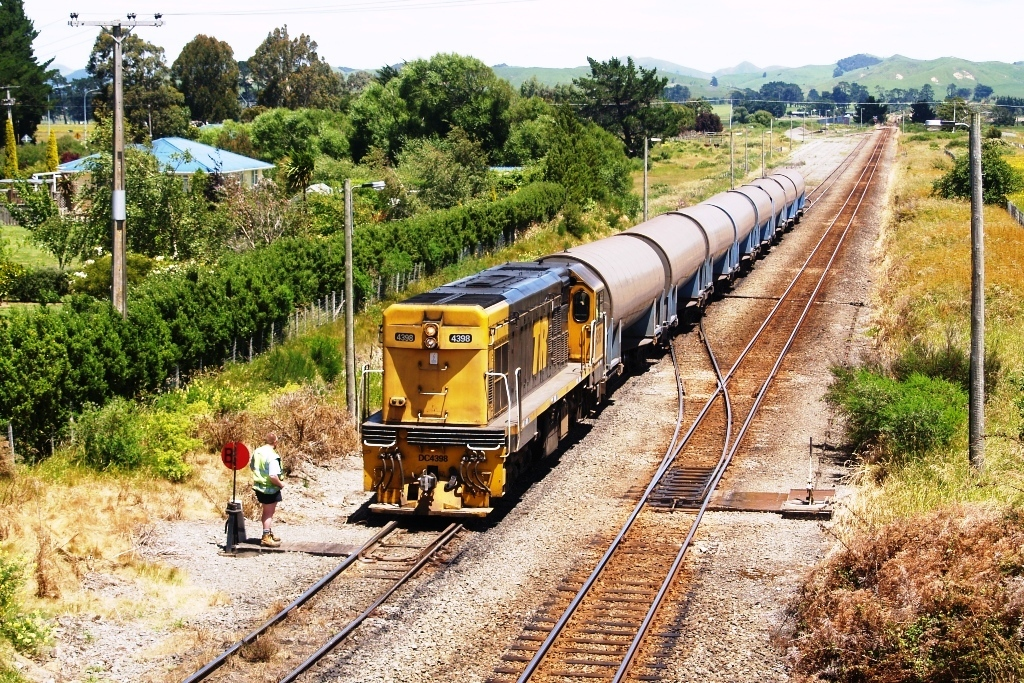
DC4398 shunts milk tanks from Palmerston North at Oringi, 2008

In the earliest years of the line, the emphasis was on local freight, primarily agricultural products. As land was cleared for farming, timber also constituted a significant commodity. By the late 20th century, the emphasis had dramatically changed to long-distance bulk freight, including frozen meat, canned foods, and fertiliser from near Gisborne. The line between Fonterra's Oringi Milk Transfer Station, just south of Dannevirke, and Palmerston North was used for hauling milk wagons that then formed part of the freight to Fonterra's Whareroa plant near Hawera on the MNPL. The number of services varied seasonally, but at peak was usually two each way per day. The transfer station closed in 2015.

Freight is conveyed to Napier Port, which is located near the PNGL and accessed via the short Ahuriri Branch. Presently, two trains run on weekdays each way between Palmerston North and Napier, with a third service one or both ways if required. A past direct service between Wellington and Napier using the Wairarapa line from Woodville has been discontinued. The Palmerston North to Woodville section of the PNGL is also utilised for two daily trains between Palmerston North and Pahiatua in the northern Wairarapa, and two shunts operate between Napier and Hastings, one in the morning and one in the afternoon.

Tunnels Nos. 3,4,5 near Woodville at the east end of the Manawatū Gorge were "daylighted" or opened out in May–November 2008 to allow the use of "hi-cube" containers on the line. The work was carried out by HRS, a subsidiary of Downers.

Following a storm in March 2012, the Wairoa–Gisborne section of the line was mothballed. The Napier–Wairoa section remained open for forestry traffic until December 2012, when it too was mothballed. In October 2016 KiwiRail and the Port of Napier announced an intention to reopen the section of line between Wairoa and the port from late 2017 due to a surge in forestry log traffic. In February 2018 it was announced that $5 million from the Provincial Development Fund would be allocated to reopen the section for forestry trains. The first train on the Napier–Wairoa line for six years ran from Napier to Eskdale on 6 June 2018 to make a ballast drop. The Napier–Wairoa section was reopened in June 2019. In 2021, it was announced the number of trains on the section would double with a weekday service added by KiwiRail.

=== Motive power ===
Steam locomotives operated most trains on the PNGL until the 1960s, when all passenger duties were taken by railcars and remaining trains were dieselised. In 1921 the earliest motive power was said to be provided by D and then by F class tank locomotives. However Class D arrived in 1874, whereas Neilsen provided two locomotives for the Napier and Pakipaki line in 1873 and an early photo labelled 'Napier Railway Station' shows a Class C engine. J class tender locomotives were introduced for the Napier Express upon its commencement and were later augmented by N class locomotives. The Ns sometimes worked in conjunction with members of the M class, and after the acquisition of the WMR, the U^{D} class also saw some use on the PNGL, especially on the Napier Express. The use of A class locomotives allowed timetables to be quickened in 1914; this again occurred with the introduction of the A^{B} class in 1925 and the K and J^{A} classes after World War II. B^{B} class locomotives were employed on the Manawatū Gorge stretch during the 1930s. On the line to Gisborne, locomotives of the A^{A}, J^{B}, and X classes were also employed. A last J^{A}-hauled train ran from Napier to Gisborne on 7 October 1966.

Steam was fully replaced by diesel motive power in 1966, with D^{A} class locomotives predominant. By the 1980s, the DF class had been introduced, the use of the underpowered DBR class had caused some tardy operation of the Endeavour, and the DA class was withdrawn by the late 1980s. During the 1990s, the DX and DC class locomotives were regularly used on the PNGL; the damage caused by Cyclone Bola meant that when repair work was undertaken, clearances were improved and the DX class were authorised to operate to Gisborne from September 1988. In the 2020s the dominant form of motive power on the PNGL is the DL class, with some services hauled by DF class locomotives and mainline shunts by DSG class locomotives.

== Incidents ==
On 22 September 1925 three were killed and several others seriously injured after the Wellington to Napier mail train derailed just south of Opapa (Te Aute) due to excessive speed (about 50 mph (80 km/h)), when taking a 7.5 ch (500 ft; 150 m) curve, with a 25 mph (40 km/h) speed limit. The derailed locomotive was NZR A Class No.600. The driver was convicted of manslaughter and imprisoned for two years.

On 23 March 1967 a freight train and railcar had a head on crash at Whakaki, injuring 16 passengers, probably due to the drivers of the DA locomotive falling asleep.

On 6 May 2005 part of a train (a 60-tonne crane and two wagons) repairing the bridge fell into the Nūhaka River at Nūhaka, when Bridge 256 collapsed beneath it, due to boring by teredo worms. No one was injured. Axle load limits were 16.3 tonnes, but the crane weighed up to 24.1 tonnes. Due to sales of lighter cranes, following privatisation, no other was available for the job. The report also mentioned an engineering manager's opinion that the standard and frequency of ageing timber bridge inspections had fallen below desirable levels and that there were insufficient engineering staff. The bridge reopened in July 2005.

In February 2023 the rail bridge at Awatoto was destroyed by Cyclone Gabrielle.

== Mothballing and closure ==
In 2018, a new rail bike operation began between Nuhaka and Kopuawhara on the mothballed Wairoa - Gisborne section.

A slip near Whareongaonga worsened in November 2021, but a 2019 feasibility study had proposed repairs for that and other slips and concluded that there was an economic case for reopening the line. Cyclone Gabrielle closed the line north of Woodville after 13 February 2023. Bridges washed away were 176 in Waipawa, 212 and 216 north of Hastings, and Waitangi bridge, 217, north of Clive and some other areas of track were undermined. Reopening to Hastings was on 3 April, but 5 piers of bridge 217 were washed away which delayed reopening of the line to Napier until 15 September. The line to Wairoa suffered extensive damage and will take even longer to reopen. In December 2023 the Prime Minister, Christopher Luxon, indicated that the Napier-Wairoa line wouldn't be reopened, saying, "My personal view is that railway is a low priority and it is something that we shouldn’t be progressing. I’d sooner take the money from that and go and invest it in upgrading the roads and, and [sic] making investments in flood protection and other things".

In 2023 local bodies in the region proposed that the Wairoa-Gisborne section of the line be re-opened at an estimated cost of $80.5 million; including a new 500m tunnel to bypass a section of track washed away when a hillside collapsed in November 2021. KiwiRail said that the reinstatement cost estimate was "optimistic".
