= Kopuawhara flash flood of 1938 =

Natural disaster in New Zealand

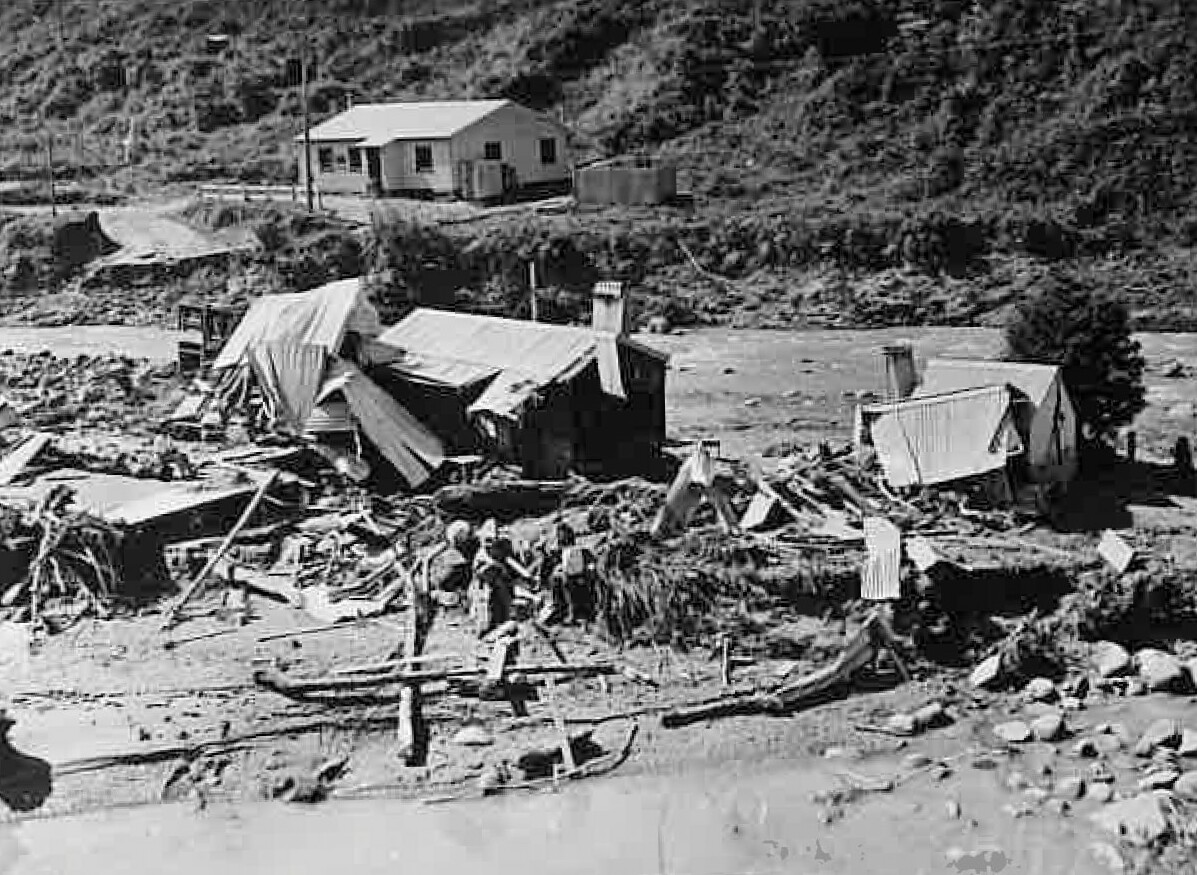
Aftermath of the Kopuawhara flash flood

A flash flood on the Waiau Stream at Kopuawhara in New Zealand on 19 February 1938 destroyed a railway construction workers camp killing 20 men and one woman, Martha Quinn.

== Waiau Stream Viaduct ==
During the construction of the Napier-Gisborne Railway line a workers camp (Camp no. 4) had been established on the banks of the Waiau Stream (also known as Kopuawhara Stream) in the Kopuawhara Valley at Kaiangapiri near Mahia. Houses had been built for married men on higher ground and the 47 single men's huts and cookhouse were built lower down closer to the stream.

== Flash flood ==
The Waiau Stream had been at flood level on 19 February when a 5 metres (16 ft) high wall of water caused by a cloudburst surged down the stream hitting the camp at 3:00 am. A workman saw the flood waters pouring into the camp site and attempted to raise the alarm before being swept away. Those who did wake attempted to take refuge on the roofs of their huts but most of the huts were destroyed by the floodwater. Those who climbed onto the roof of the cookhouse survived even though it partially collapsed. About 11 men took refuge in one of the work trucks but the waters overturned it and they were swept away. One bonnet of a vehicle was eventually found 12 kilometres (7.5 mi) downstream.

No. 2 camp was about 5 kilometres (3.1 mi) further downstream where 47 more workers were staying. Fortunately, the alarm was raised early enough for them to reach higher ground. The only other casualty in the area was a man at Boyd's Camp by the Maraetaha Stream at the Gisborne end of the railway line.

The rain gauges in the Kopuawhara area had registered 8 inches of rain the day before the disaster and 20 inches within 10 hours prior to the flash flood. The flow in the Waiau stream was calculated as having reached 33,900 cusecs. A fortnight later the stream had a flow of 22 cusecs. This event exceeded the 150-year rainfall return period.

== Inquest ==
An inquest was held into the disaster. At the inquest John Victor Haskell, a railways construction engineer said he had selected the camp site after a year's observation and on-site inspections. He had found that there was no evidence of flood waters ever being less than 6 feet below the lowest areas of the site. Onslow Garth Thornton, District Engineer of the Public Works Department told the inquest that the normal flow for the stream was 27 cusecs, and the stream channel had a capacity of 13,728 cusecs. The catchment area for the stream was 12.64 square miles. At a one-foot flood level it would have a flow of 16,932 cusecs. He described the flow of the flash flood as unprecedented and well beyond the worst he had seen in the area even at times with heavier rainfall.

== Aftermath ==
After an extensive search, only two bodies remained missing, Ivan Martinac and Roderick Douglas Neish.

Compensation was paid by the Government to the families of those who lost their lives.

A mass grave for 11 of those killed is in the Wairoa cemetery, with the remaining workers being buried in their respective hometowns.

== Monument ==
In 1942, a monument to the flood victims was put up on the high ground above the river.
