= Mākaraka, New Zealand =

Mākaraka
- Suburb
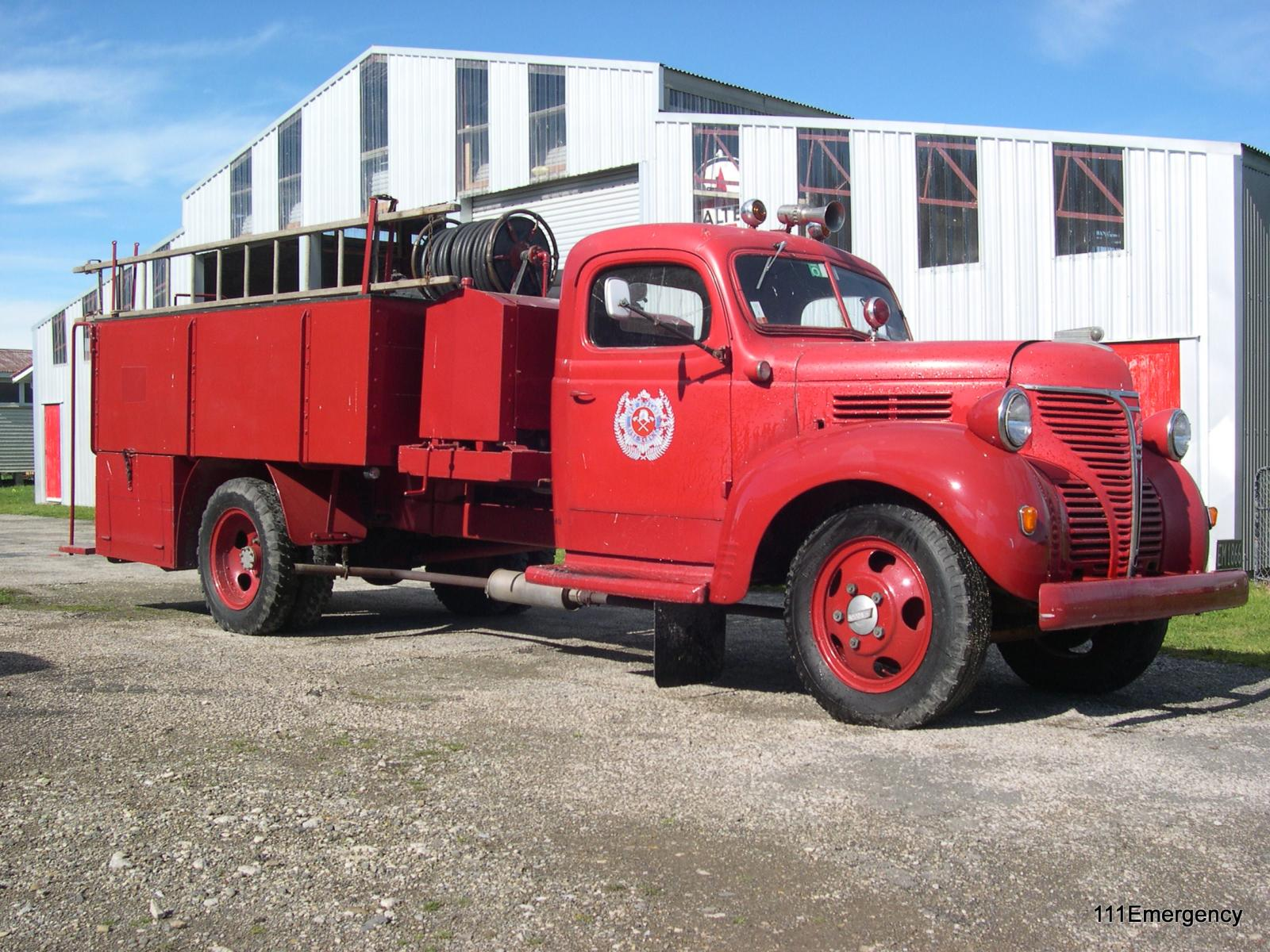
- Fire truck at the East Coast Museum of Technology
- Interactive map of Mākaraka
- Coordinates: 38°39′S 177°58′E
- Country: New Zealand
- City: Gisborne
- Electoral ward: Gisborne

Area
  - Land: 326 ha (810 acres)

Population (2023 Census)
  - Total: 537
  - Density: 165/km^{2} (427/sq mi)

Pātūtahi		Makauri
	Mākaraka	Te Hapara
Manutuke		Awapuni

Mākaraka is an outer suburb of Gisborne, in New Zealand's North Island, located in the west of the city. The suburb features Gisborne's horse-racing circuit, Makaraka Racecourse. It is part of the statistical area of Makaraka-Awapuni, which is covered at Awapuni.

Mākaraka was settled by dairy farmers in the 19th century. A dairy factory was built in the settlement in 1899.

The Tarere Marae, located near Mākaraka, is a tribal meeting place of Te Whānau a Iwi, a hapū of Te Aitanga ā Māhaki. It includes Te Aotipu meeting house.

== Demographics ==
Mākaraka covers 3.26 km^{2} (1.26 sq mi). It is part of the Makaraka-Awapuni statistical area.

Historical population
Year	Pop.	±% p.a.
2006	399	—
2013	384	−0.55%
2018	444	+2.95%
2023	537	+3.88%

Mākaraka had a population of 537 in the 2023 New Zealand census, an increase of 93 people (20.9%) since the 2018 census, and an increase of 153 people (39.8%) since the 2013 census. There were 288 males, 246 females, and 3 people of other genders in 159 dwellings. 2.2% of people identified as LGBTIQ+. There were 111 people (20.7%) aged under 15 years, 87 (16.2%) aged 15 to 29, 246 (45.8%) aged 30 to 64, and 90 (16.8%) aged 65 or older.

People could identify as more than one ethnicity. The results were 66.5% European (Pākehā); 48.6% Māori; 7.3% Pasifika; 2.2% Asian; 0.6% Middle Eastern, Latin American and African New Zealanders (MELAA); and 3.4% other, which includes people giving their ethnicity as "New Zealander". English was spoken by 97.2%, Māori by 13.4%, Samoan by 3.9%, and other languages by 2.8%. No language could be spoken by 1.1% (e.g. too young to talk). The percentage of people born overseas was 11.2, compared with 28.8% nationally.

Religious affiliations were 33.0% Christian, 0.6% Hindu, 3.9% Māori religious beliefs, 0.6% Buddhist, and 0.6% New Age. People who answered that they had no religion were 52.5%, and 10.1% of people did not answer the census question.

Of those at least 15 years old, 48 (11.3%) people had a bachelor's or higher degree, 252 (59.2%) had a post-high school certificate or diploma, and 129 (30.3%) people exclusively held high school qualifications. 24 people (5.6%) earned over $100,000 compared to 12.1% nationally. The employment status of those at least 15 was 213 (50.0%) full-time, 75 (17.6%) part-time, and 12 (2.8%) unemployed.

== Education ==
Makaraka School is a Year 1–6 co-educational public primary school with a roll of 113 as of October 2025. It opened in 1875.

== Railway station ==
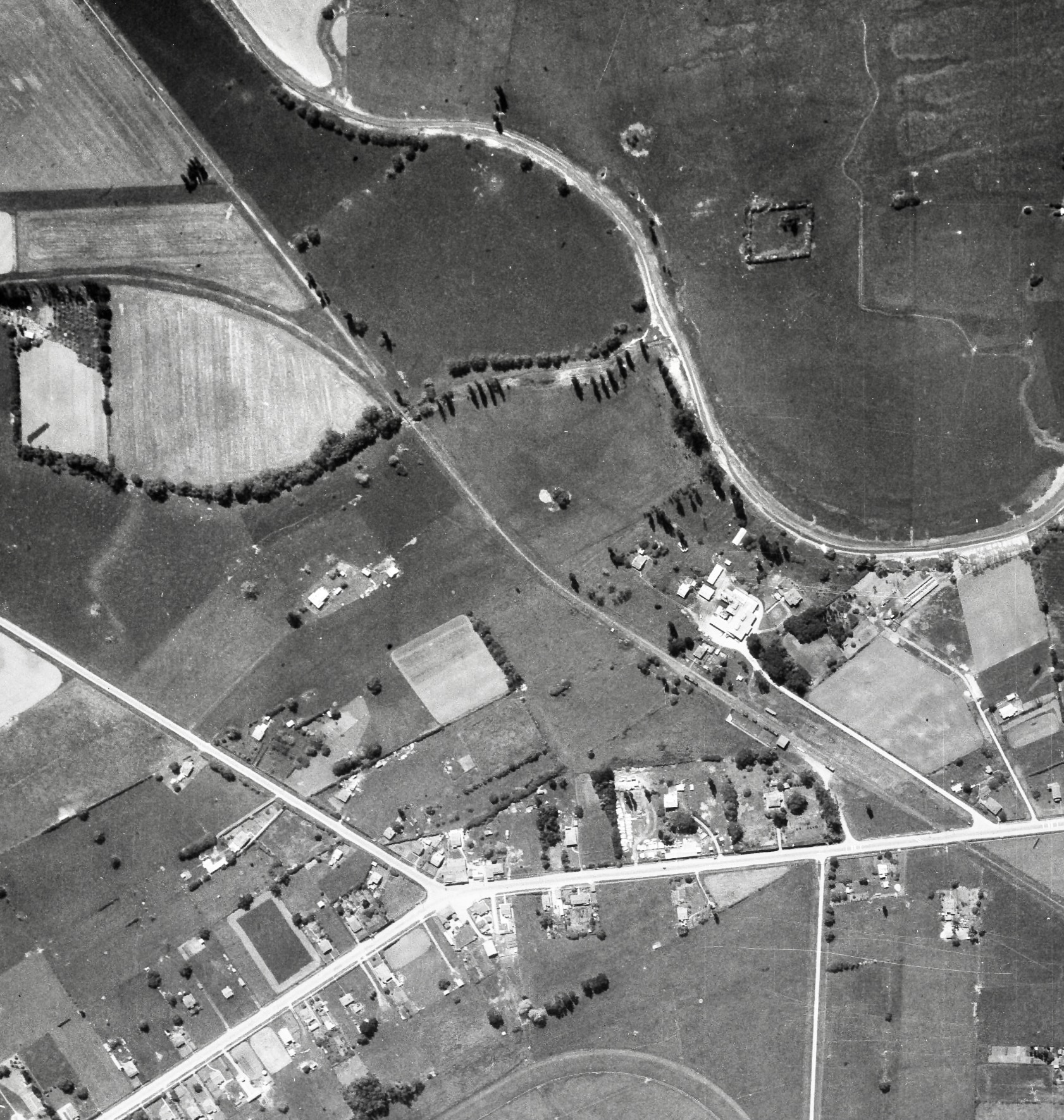
Mākaraka in 1942, showing the Ngātapa branch diverging west from the Moutohora branch

From 1902 to 1959 Mākaraka had a railway station on the Moutohora Branch and, from 1915 to 1931, was the junction for the Ngātapa Branch. It is now the mothballed Makaraka Industrial Line and also has the East Coast Museum of Technology station building (from Matawhero) and museum on the former station site.

	Disused railways	
Pātūtahi (Ngātapa Branch); Line and station closed 7.9 km (4.9 mi)	Moutohora Branch	Park Racecourse; Line mothballed, station closed 1.59 km (0.99 mi)
King's Road; Line and station closed 3.14 km (1.95 mi)	Moutohora Branch	Park Racecourse; Line mothballed, station closed 1.59 km (0.99 mi)
