= Mātāwai =

Settlement in Gisborne District, New Zealand

Mātāwai Mātāwai
- Settlement
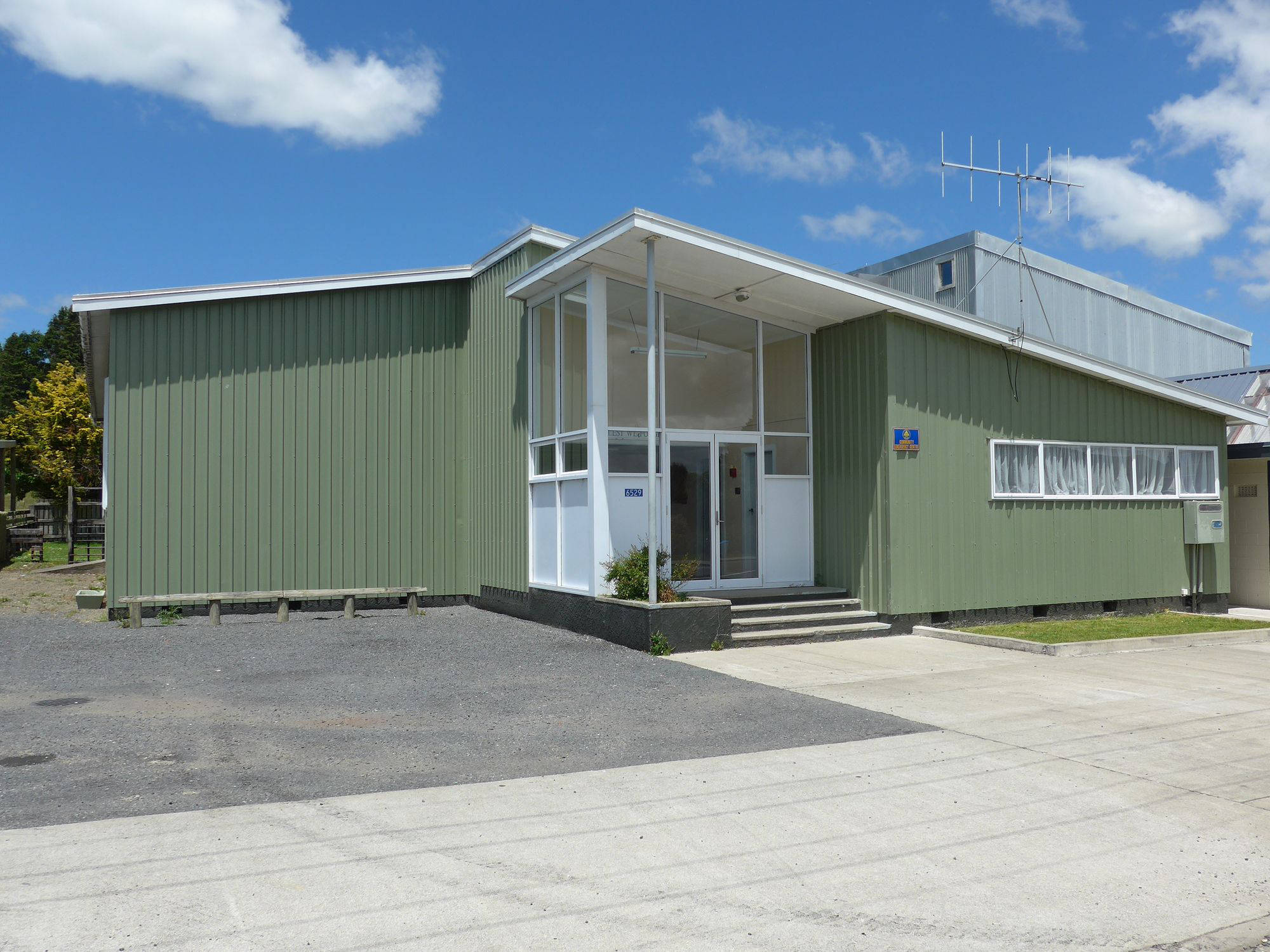
- Matawai War Memorial Hall
- Interactive map of Mātāwai
- Coordinates: 38°21′S 177°32′E
- Country: New Zealand
- Region: Gisborne District
- Electorates: East Cape; Ikaroa-Rāwhiti (Māori)

Government
  - Territorial authority: Gisborne District Council
  - Mayor of Gisborne: Rehette Stoltz
  - East Cape MP: Dana Kirkpatrick
  - Ikaroa-Rāwhiti MP: Cushla Tangaere-Manuel

Mātāwai is a small inland settlement in the Gisborne Region in the northeast of New Zealand's North Island. It is located on the upper reaches of the Mōtū River, in the Raukūmara Range. It is on State Highway 2 between Gisborne and Ōpōtiki.

The Matawai War Memorial Hall was opened in 1952, replacing a previous hall built in 1910. It was refurbished in 2016 to accommodate war rolls of honour from neighbouring communities.

== Parks ==
The settlement's main reserve, Matawai Reserve, is a sports ground and local park.

== Marae ==
The local Mātāwai Marae and Tapapa meeting house is a meeting place of Te Aitanga ā Māhaki's hapū of Ngā Pōtiki, Ngāti Mātāwai, Ngāti Wahia and Te Whānau a Taupara.

In October 2020, the Government committed $812,548 from the Provincial Growth Fund to upgrade it and Te Wainui Marae, creating 15.4 jobs.

== Education ==
Matawai School is a Year 1–8 co-educational public primary school. In 2019, it was a decile 4 school with a roll of 58.

The nearby Otoko School was closed in 1997.

== Climate ==
Climate data for Matawai M.A.F. E.D.L., elevation 580 m (1,900 ft), (1985–1988)
Month	Jan	Feb	Mar	Apr	May	Jun	Jul	Aug	Sep	Oct	Nov	Dec	Year
Mean daily maximum °C (°F)	23.6 (74.5)	23.1 (73.6)	19.8 (67.6)	17.1 (62.8)	14.2 (57.6)	11.7 (53.1)	10.8 (51.4)	11.8 (53.2)	13.6 (56.5)	16.3 (61.3)	18.2 (64.8)	20.2 (68.4)	16.7 (62.1)
Daily mean °C (°F)	16.3 (61.3)	15.5 (59.9)	13.0 (55.4)	11.0 (51.8)	8.2 (46.8)	5.9 (42.6)	5.1 (41.2)	6.6 (43.9)	7.9 (46.2)	10.7 (51.3)	12.5 (54.5)	14.2 (57.6)	10.6 (51.0)
Mean daily minimum °C (°F)	8.9 (48.0)	7.8 (46.0)	6.2 (43.2)	4.9 (40.8)	2.1 (35.8)	0.1 (32.2)	−0.7 (30.7)	1.3 (34.3)	2.1 (35.8)	5.1 (41.2)	6.7 (44.1)	8.2 (46.8)	4.4 (39.9)
Source: NIWA

== Railway station ==
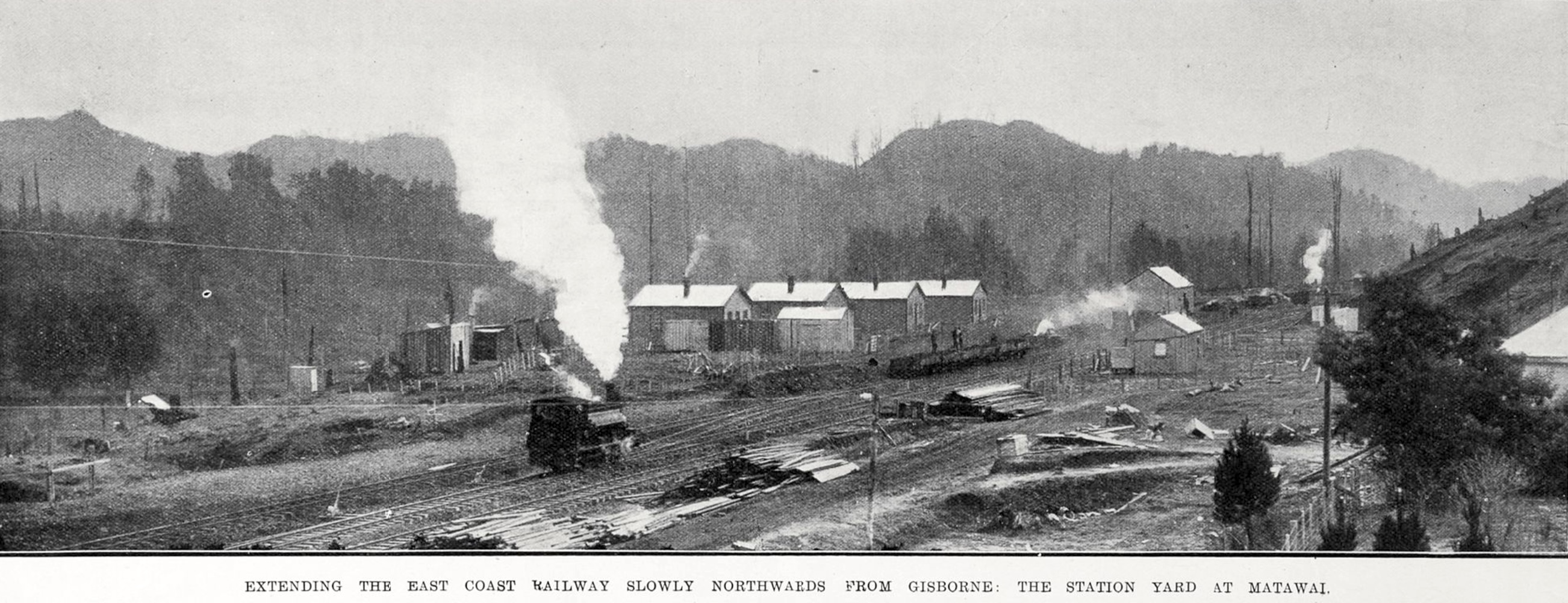
Mātāwai railway station being built in 1913

Railway houses were built in 1912 and PWD started a train service in May 1913. By 2 November 1914, when the Moutohora Branch officially opened from Otoko, Mātāwai station also had a building, platform, 30 ft (9.1 m) x 20 ft (6.1 m) goods shed, loading bank, cattle and sheep yards, engine shed, a 6,000 gallon water vat and a passing loop for 41 wagons, 43 mi 46 ch (70.1 km) from Gisborne. The branch was extended 4 mi 71 ch (7.9 km) to Moutohora in November 1917. Until 7 January 1918 there was a stationmaster. A house was added in 1921 and 2 more in 1942. The station closed with the branch on 15 March 1959.
