= Ngatapa Branch =

New Zealand railway line

Map

The Ngatapa Branch was a secondary branch line railway 18.5 kilometres (11.5 mi) long that for a short time formed part of the national rail network in Poverty Bay in the North Island of New Zealand. The Ngatapa branch diverged from the Moutohora branch line about 6 kilometres (3.7 mi) from Gisborne and ran a further 12.5 kilometres (7.8 mi) across the coastal flat to a terminus at Ngatapa. It was sometimes referred to as the Ngapata branch.

Built to the New Zealand standard 3 ft 6 in (1,067 mm) gauge the branch was originally authorised as part of the proposed inland route for the Wairoa to Gisborne section of the Palmerston North – Gisborne Line. However, in 1924, an engineer's report recommended that the then-new isolated section between Wairoa and Waikokopu in Hawke's Bay be incorporated as the southernmost portion of a new coastal route from Wairoa to Gisborne. The Public Works Department (PWD) accordingly stopped work on the inland Ngatapa route, which was officially opened as a branch line on 15 December 1924, and began work on the coastal route. The Ngatapa branch became a dead end, and it was closed on 1 April 1931.

== Construction ==
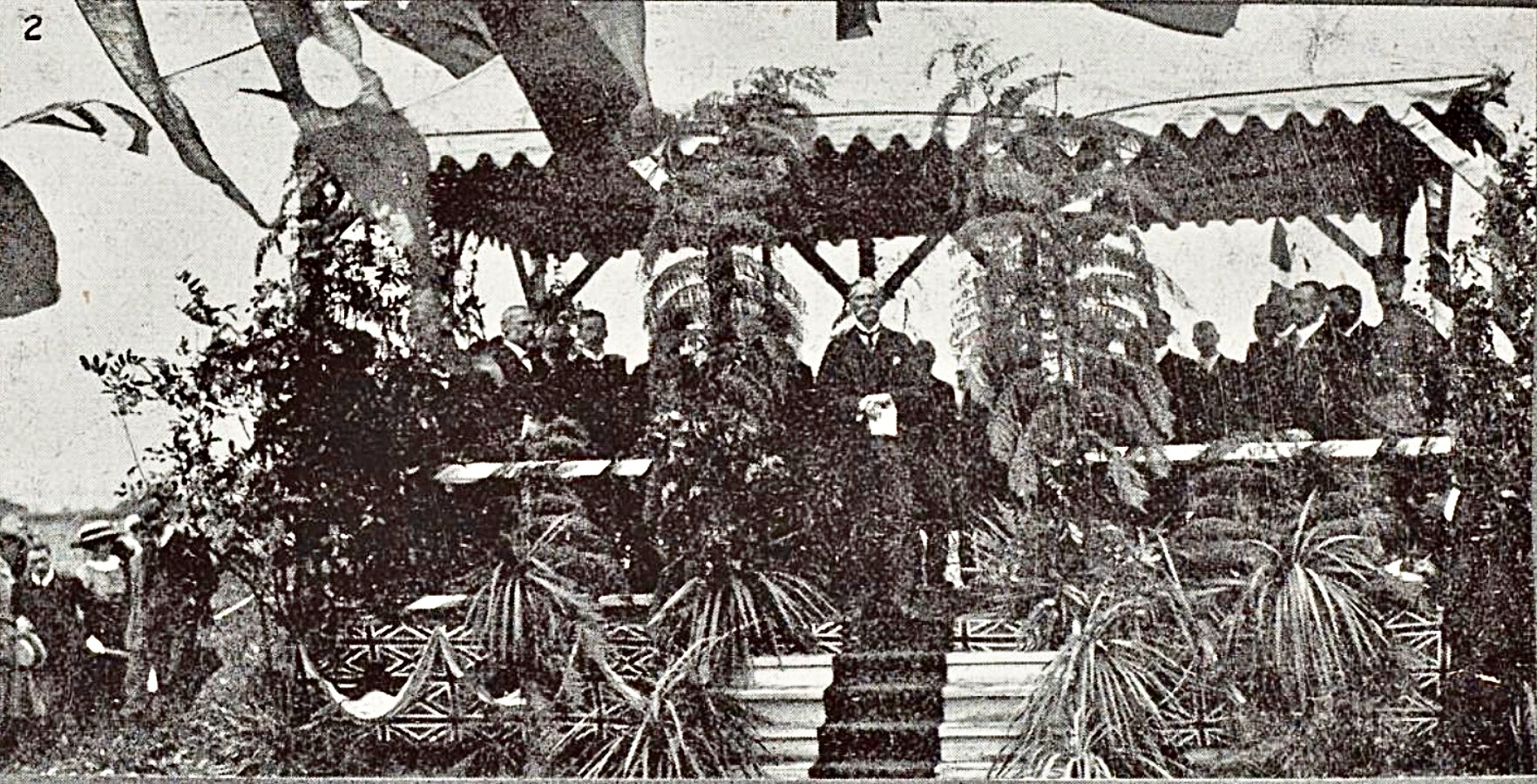
Lord Islington turning the first sod near King's Road in 1912

Construction started in 1911. The first sod was turned by the Governor, Lord Islington, on Saturday 10 February 1912, just north of King's Road, where the branch was intended to join the line towards Rotorua. In July 1912 it was decided that the junction should instead be near Mākaraka. There was much criticism of slow progress; the 1912 Reform government cut spending on many branches and were slow to mechanise work. In 1914 there were also complaints that a change from cooperative contracts to contracts with small contractors wasn't working. Due to the slips the route near Ngātapa was changed and contracts postponed. The Minister of Public Works, William Fraser, said £45,000 was budgeted for the line in 1914-15 and £45,968 had been spent. The rails reached Ngātapa on 7 July 1914. The only substantial structure was the bridge over the Waipaoa River. It had 3 spans of 25 ft (7.6 m) and 2 of 106 ft (32 m). A temporary bridge was built over the river in 1913, but swept away in 1914. The line was completed to Ngatapa by December 1915, although it was not formally handed over to the New Zealand Railways Department (NZR) until 15 December 1924. In 1915 earthworks and a short tunnel were being built in the 3 miles beyond Ngātapa. Between 1918 and 1920, work started at Wairoa on the section to Frasertown, which was to have been linked through to Ngatapa, and on the Waikura section beyond Ngatapa, but all work was stopped in 1920 after the Waikura section was found to be unstable.

Construction of the line presented few problems as far as Ngatapa. The course of the line beyond this point was a different matter and would have required heavy earthworks and extensive tunnelling the longest being about 1.25 mi (2 km). The Gisborne-Wairoa distance as built was 96.05 km (59.68 mi). In 1929 the route via Ngātapa had been surveyed as 72 mi 19 ch (116.3 km) and the coastal route via Waikokopu as 68 mi 12 ch (109.7 km). The surveyed Ngātapa line would have been - Gisborne-Mākaraka 3 mi 5 ch (4.9 km), -Ngātapa 11 mi 51 ch (18.7 km), -Wharekōpae 4 mi 69 ch (7.8 km), -Waikura 5 mi 40 ch (8.9 km), -Waterfall 6 mi 66 ch (11.0 km), -Hangaroa 4m, -Te Reinga 17 mi 11 ch (27.6 km), -Marumaru 9 mi 40 ch (15.3 km), -Wairoa 10 mi (16 km). In his 1919-20 report the Minister said banks had been widened, ballast-crushing intermittently carried on at Repongaere quarry, including 614 tons of lime supplied to farmers (in 1922 it supplied 400 tons of lime), and 2 mi (3.2 km) beyond Ngātapa was repegged, levelled, cross-sectioned and had earthworks started. Work also started on the Wairoa to Frasertown section in September 1919. The Minister said progress had been hindered by the shortage of cement and scarcity and quality of labour, which was possibly due to low pay. Beyond Ngatapa, some formation work was undertaken for about 8 km, including the excavation of a short tunnel; including a large cutting, 3 mi (4.8 km) was partly formed and rails were laid for 1 mi 50 ch (2.6 km). Today, earthworks such as embankments and cuttings can still be found, but no actual tunnels can be located, possibly due to collapse in the slip prone ground.

== Operations and closure ==
From 13 December 1915 the Public Works Department (PWD) was operating goods and passenger trains on the branch, though ballasting wasn't completed until 1916, most of it being dragged from the Waipaoa River bed by scoop on an aerial cableway. Traffic was described as very light in 1916. Responsibility for the line was transferred from PWD to NZR on 15 December 1924. The NZR service ran from Gisborne, rather than Mākaraka. The line carried only about 12,000 tonnes of freight per annum, almost all road metal. By 1930 a Railways Commission noted that with the abandonment of the originally proposed inland route the need for the line had disappeared, and the twice-daily Monday to Saturday NZR service attracted an average of only 20 passengers a day. The commission recommended the branch should either close or be taken over by its users, the PWD, or the Gisborne City Council. There were no takers, and the line was closed on 1 April 1931. By 1931 stone from the quarry was almost the only traffic and said not to justify keeping the branch open.

== Stations ==
Stations on the branch were -

Name	Distance from Gisborne	Opened	Closed	Elevation	Notes
Mākaraka	3 mi 12 ch (5.1 km)	26 June 1902 31 March 1979 renamed as Gisborne Industrial Line	29 January 1945 to passengers 15 March 1959 to freight	5 m (16 ft)	Mākaraka in 1942, showing the Ngātapa branch diverging west from the Moutohora branch The station serving the suburb of Mākaraka opened on the Moutohora branch on 26 June 1902. In July 1912 it was decided that the Ngātapa branch junction would be about half a kilometre north of the station. In 1916 a platelayer's cottage was built and by 1926 there was a station building, platform, cart approach, 30 ft (9.1 m) x 20 ft (6.1 m) goods shed (with a corrugated iron roof, stringers of rimu, studs, plates and purlins of matai and weatherboard walls), cattle and sheep yards, urinals and a passing loop for 62 wagons. Feilding Sash & Door Co had a private siding until 1937. In 1947 the goods shed verandah was removed. In 1957 regular traffic included cream from Moutohora and Puha and stone for the Ministry of Works. After closure of the Moutohora Branch on 15 March 1959 the track was lifted in 1960 to 35 ch (700 m) north of Mākaraka, just south of bridge No 3. By 1962 the siding was rarely used and the station building in a dilapidated condition. In 1963 the station building was sold to the Chief Stationmaster at Gisborne for removal for £5. The goods shed remained, but the station site was sold in September 1994. A single track remains, behind the East Coast Museum of Technology station, which was moved from nearby Matawhero. In 1916 there was also a request for a siding at Bushmere, near the Waipaoa River, but it was rejected as being too close to Mākaraka.
Pātūtahi	8 mi (13 km)	13 December 1915 PWD 15 December 1924 NZR	1 April 1931	39 ft (12 m)	Pātūtahi in 1942 Also sometimes called Putatahi, or Patuahi, the station served the small village of Pātūtahi. A plan for the flag station was made in 1913. By 1921 some buildings needed repair and two 16 ft (4.9 m) gates were painted. By 1924 there was a shelter shed, platform, 30 ft (9.1 m) x 20 ft (6.1 m) goods shed, loading bank, cattle and sheep yards and a passing loop for 58 wagons. By 1926 urinals had been added.
Repongaere	10 mi 54 ch (17.2 km)	13 December 1915 PWD 15 December 1924 NZR	18 May 1931	27 m (89 ft)	Repongaere station (top right) and quarry (bottom left) in 1942 Repongaere, or Repongarere, was also a flag station, mainly serving the quarry. In 1915 the new quarry near Repongaere had a temporary line into it. 4 railway houses were built in 1916 and more in 1924. By 1926 Repongaere had a station building, platform, cart approach, loading bank and a passing loop for 41 wagons.
Ngātapa	14 mi 45 ch (23.4 km)	13 December 1915 PWD 15 December 1924 NZR	1 April 1931	231 ft (70 m)	Auckland Weekly News photo of the railway at Ngātapa in 1916 Planning for the station to serve Ngātapa began in 1912, with cottages built in 1913 and, in March 1914, a tender for the station was accepted. By 1919 a platform and goods shed had been built, but the yard was still to be ballasted and the station building built. In 1921 a verandah was added to the goods shed and the yard, platform and loading bank were raised to avoid flooding. 4 railway houses were built in 1916 and more in 1924, by which time Ngātapa had a shelter shed, ladies waiting room, platform, 30 ft (9.1 m) x 20 ft (6.1 m) goods shed, loading bank, cattle and sheep yards.

== Remains ==
Not much remains of the branch formation or other works on the coastal plain. Apart from the bridge piers of the Waipaoa River crossing between Makaraka and Patutahi, the most significant remains are those past the original terminus at Ngatapa, over which trains never ran but which illustrate the problems that would have faced the constructors if the line had continued into the hills. Beyond the terminus at Ngatapa the formation works take the proposed line through a 180-degree climbing turn before following a winding path across the face of the hills until disappearing into the bush.

== See also ==
- Palmerston North–Gisborne Line
- Ahuriri / Napier Port Branch
- Moutohora / Makaraka Branch
- Gentle Annie tramway, which ran parallel and just to the south
