= Gisborne City Vintage Railway =

Railway preservation group in New Zealand

Coordinates: 38.6719°S 178.0228°E

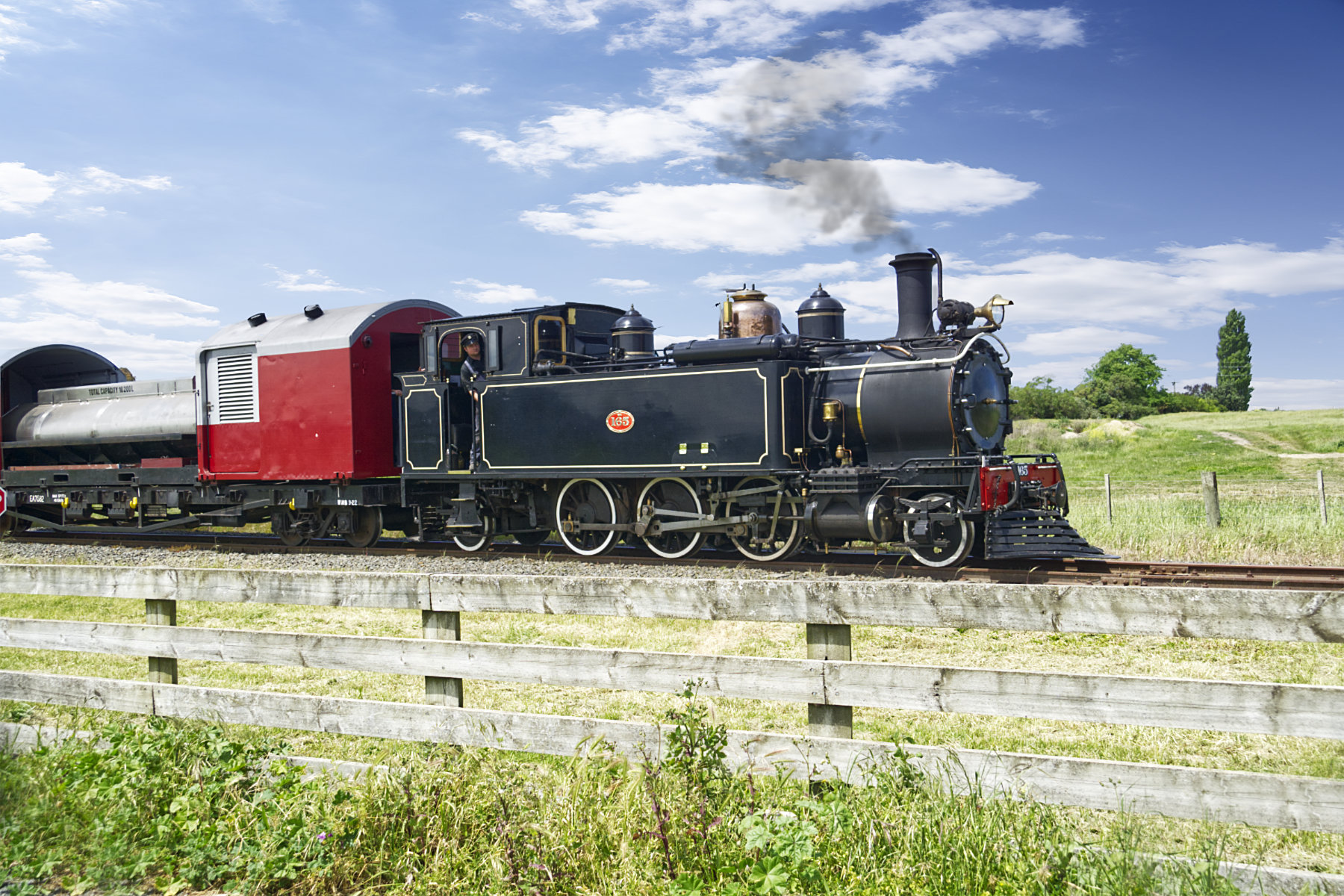
- Locomotive W^{A} 165 near State Highway 2
- Locale: Gisborne, New Zealand
- Terminus: Gisborne

Commercial operations
- Name: Palmerston North–Gisborne Line
- Original gauge: 3 ft 6 in (1,067 mm)

Preserved operations
- Stations: Gisborne
- Preserved gauge: 3 ft 6 in (1,067 mm)

Commercial history
- Opened: 3 August 1942
- Closed: 18 March 2012

The Gisborne City Vintage Railway (GCVR) Incorporated is a railway preservation group based in Gisborne, New Zealand. Operating on part of the northern section of the mothballed Palmerston North–Gisborne Line, the group was founded in 1985. After signing a lease with KiwiRail, Gisborne City Vintage Railway now operates its steam locomotive W^{A} 165 on public excursion trains from Gisborne south to Muriwai, a distance of about 17 kilometres (11 mi). GCVR runs charter and public excursions, mainly from October to June.

From 1986, the group began restoration of W^{A} 165, the first locomotive built at NZR's Hillside Workshops in 1897. The locomotive was returned to steam in October 2000. The group then began running excursions from Gisborne.

== Lease ==
In March 2012, KiwiRail announced that it was mothballing the Napier-Gisborne section of the Palmerston North-Gisborne Line, due to the cost of repairing storm damage to the line. This put the future of Gisborne City Vintage Railway in question. In 2013, the group's president, Geoff Joyce, told the Gisborne District Council that the group was preparing a business case to lease the line from KiwiRail. The plan included leasing 34 km (21 mi) of track from Gisborne to Beach Loop. In September 2015, Gisborne City Vintage Railway signed a License to Occupy agreement with KiwiRail, which enables them to lease the line from Gisborne to Beach Loop. In addition to paying the lease, they also have to maintain that section of the line including all of the bridges.

== Repairs and maintenance ==
As of 1 January 2021, damage to the track at Beach Loop was preventing Gisborne City Vintage Railway from operating south of Muriwai. In December 2022, the Eastland Group announced that the Tūranganui River railway bridge, used by the train to collect cruise ship passengers from the port was no longer considered safe. As an interim measure, a bus was arranged to take cruise ship passengers from the port to connect with the train. Later that month, the Gisborne City Vintage Railway reported that it aimed to raise $800,000 to undertake repairs and maintenance on the line to Muriwai.

== See also ==
- NZR WA class
- Locomotives of New Zealand
