= Pātūtahi =

Settlement in Gisborne District, New Zealand

- Settlement
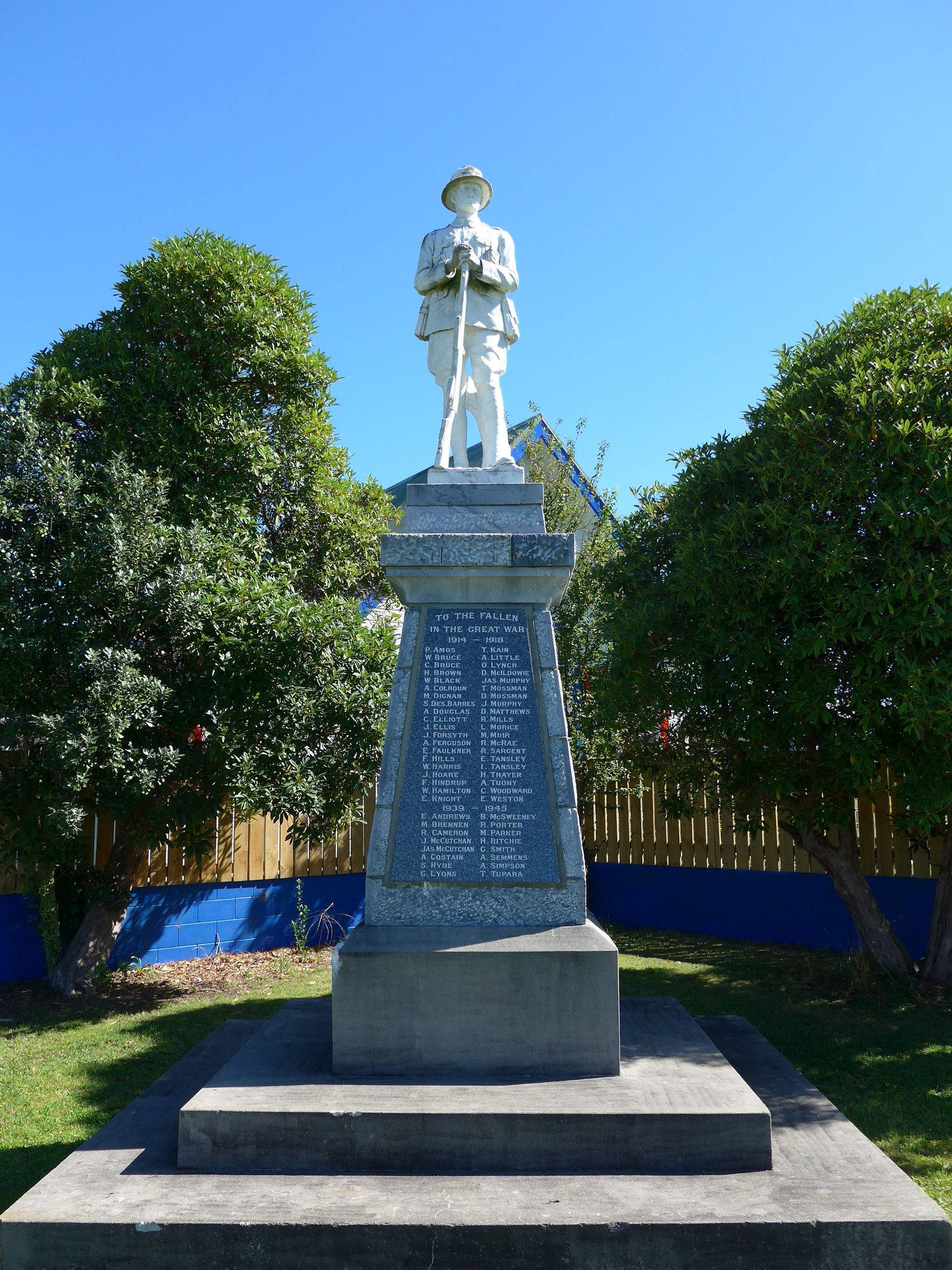
- Pātūtahi War Memorial
- Interactive map of Pātūtahi
- Coordinates: 38°37′S 177°54′E
- Country: New Zealand
- Region: Gisborne District
- Ward: Tairāwhiti General Ward
- Electorates: East Cape; Ikaroa-Rāwhiti (Māori)

Government
  - Territorial authority: Gisborne District Council
  - Mayor of Gisborne: Rehette Stoltz
  - East Cape MP: Dana Kirkpatrick
  - Ikaroa-Rāwhiti MP: Cushla Tangaere-Manuel

Area
  - Total: 3.12 km^{2} (1.20 sq mi)

Population (June 2025)
  - Total: 350
  - Density: 110/km^{2} (290/sq mi)
- Postcode(s): 4072

Pātūtahi is a small settlement 15 kilometres from Gisborne, in the northeast of New Zealand's North Island. It is located in the valley of the Waipaoa River. From 1915 to 1931 Pātūtahi had a railway station on the Ngātapa Branch.

The name was officially modified to include macrons in 2021.

== Demographics ==
Stats NZ describes Pātūtahi as a rural settlement, which covers 3.12 km^{2} (1.20 sq mi). It had an estimated population of 350 as of June 2025, with a population density of 112 people per km^{2}. It is part of the larger Te Arai statistical area.

Historical population
Year	Pop.	±% p.a.
2006	339	—
2013	318	−0.91%
2018	330	+0.74%
2023	339	+0.54%

Pātūtahi had a population of 339 in the 2023 New Zealand census, an increase of 9 people (2.7%) since the 2018 census, and an increase of 21 people (6.6%) since the 2013 census. There were 168 males and 168 females in 111 dwellings. 1.8% of people identified as LGBTIQ+. The median age was 37.3 years (compared with 38.1 years nationally). There were 81 people (23.9%) aged under 15 years, 57 (16.8%) aged 15 to 29, 147 (43.4%) aged 30 to 64, and 54 (15.9%) aged 65 or older.

People could identify as more than one ethnicity. The results were 46.0% European (Pākehā), 64.6% Māori, 6.2% Pasifika, and 3.5% other, which includes people giving their ethnicity as "New Zealander". English was spoken by 97.3%, Māori by 22.1%, and other languages by 0.9%. No language could be spoken by 0.9% (e.g. too young to talk). The percentage of people born overseas was 7.1, compared with 28.8% nationally.

Religious affiliations were 33.6% Christian, 5.3% Māori religious beliefs, and 1.8% other religions. People who answered that they had no religion were 46.9%, and 11.5% of people did not answer the census question.

Of those at least 15 years old, 33 (12.8%) people had a bachelor's or higher degree, 144 (55.8%) had a post-high school certificate or diploma, and 75 (29.1%) people exclusively held high school qualifications. The median income was $35,800, compared with $41,500 nationally. 12 people (4.7%) earned over $100,000 compared to 12.1% nationally. The employment status of those at least 15 was 129 (50.0%) full-time, 45 (17.4%) part-time, and 6 (2.3%) unemployed.

== Parks ==
Patutahi Soccer Ground is a sports ground in Pātūtahi.

== Marae ==
The area has three marae belonging to the hapū of Te Aitanga-a-Māhaki.

Pakowhai Marae and Te Poho o Hiraina meeting house, and Rongopai Marae and meeting house are a meeting place of Te Whānau a Kai.

Takitimu Marae and Te Poho o Whakarau Oratanga a Tamure meeting house are a meeting place of Ngā Pōtiki and Te Whānau a Kai.

In October 2020, the Government committed $499,625 from the Provincial Growth Fund towards a fire alarm and stormwater upgrade to Rongopai Marae, creating an estimated 7.7 jobs. It also committed $460,500 to upgrade Pakowhai Marae, Takitimu Marae and Ngātapa Marae, creating 13 jobs.

== Education ==
Patutahi School is a Year 1–8 co-educational state primary school with a roll of 68 as of July 2026. The school started in 1878.
