= Awapuni, Gisborne =

Suburb of Gisborne, New Zealand

Awapuni
- Suburb
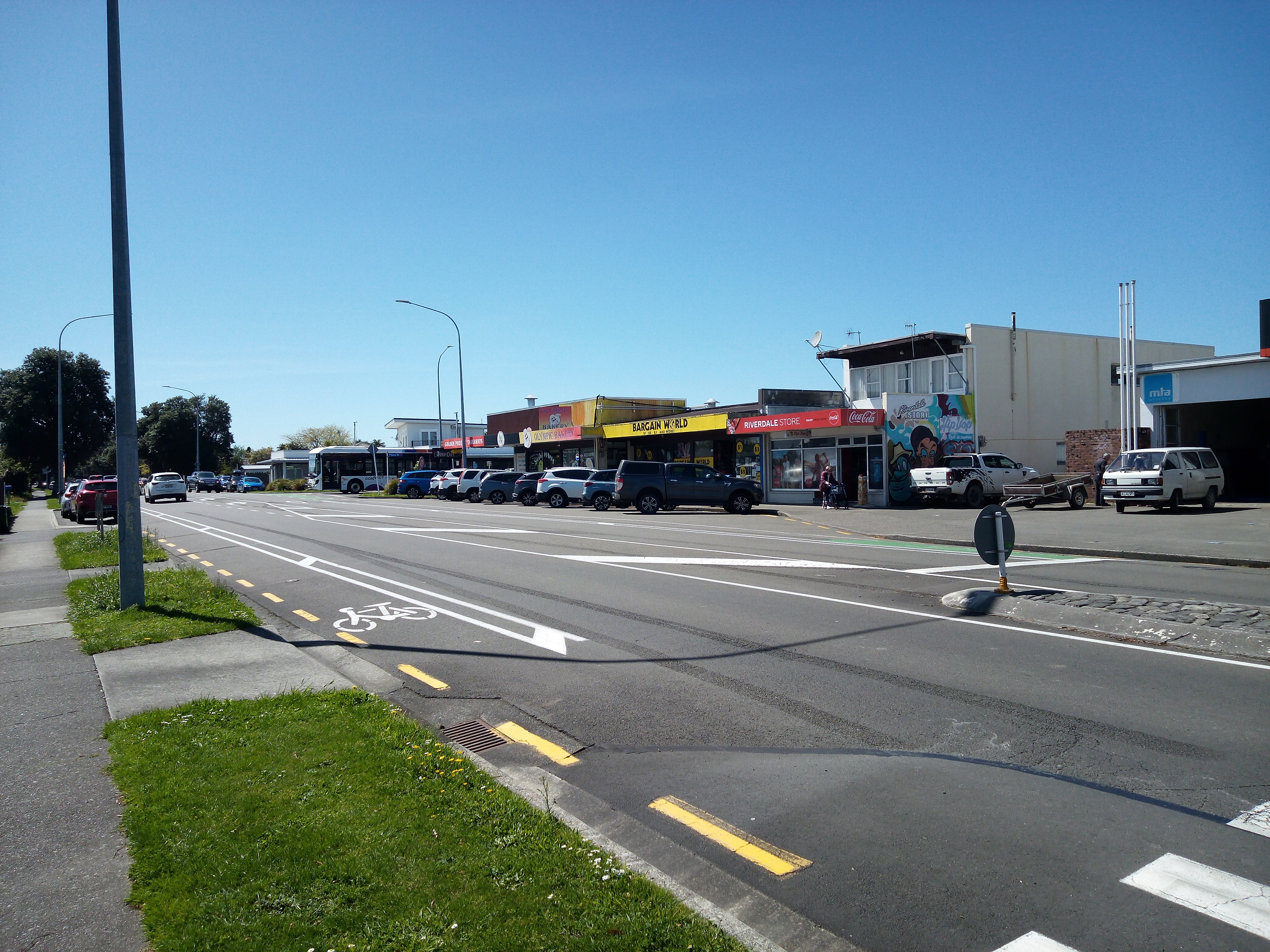
- A view of Awapuni from College Street
- Interactive map of Awapuni
- Coordinates: 38.6676°S 178.0003°E
- Country: New Zealand
- City: Gisborne
- Local authority: Gisborne District Council
- Electoral ward: Tairāwhiti General Ward

Area
  - Land: 869 ha (2,150 acres)

Population (June 2025)
  - Total: 1,090
  - Density: 125/km^{2} (325/sq mi)
- Airports: Gisborne Airport

Mākaraka	Elgin	Gisborne Central
	Awapuni	Victoria
	(Poverty Bay)

Awapuni is a suburb of the New Zealand city of Gisborne, located in the southwest of the city. It is named after the Awapuni lagoon, where the Waipaoa River runs into the ocean. The New Zealand Ministry for Culture and Heritage gives a translation of "blocked-up river" for Awapuni.

The local Awapuni Pā, also known as Te Kuri a Tuatai, is a tribal meeting place of the Rongowhakaata hapū of Ruapani, Ngāi Tāwhiri and Te Whānau a Iwi. It includes the Whareroa meeting house.

== Demographics ==
The statistical area of Makaraka-Awapuni, which also includes Makaraka, covers 8.69 km^{2} (3.36 sq mi) and had an estimated population of 1,090 as of June 2025, with a population density of 126 people per km^{2}.

Historical population
Year	Pop.	±% p.a.
2006	864	—
2013	828	−0.61%
2018	975	+3.32%
2023	1,077	+2.01%
The 2006 population is for a smaller area of 8.18 km^{2}. Source:

Makaraka-Awapuni had a population of 1,077 in the 2023 New Zealand census, an increase of 102 people (10.5%) since the 2018 census, and an increase of 249 people (30.1%) since the 2013 census. There were 579 males, 495 females, and 6 people of other genders in 372 dwellings. 2.8% of people identified as LGBTIQ+. The median age was 40.2 years (compared with 38.1 years nationally). There were 192 people (17.8%) aged under 15 years, 192 (17.8%) aged 15 to 29, 489 (45.4%) aged 30 to 64, and 204 (18.9%) aged 65 or older.

People could identify as more than one ethnicity. The results were 67.4% European (Pākehā); 47.4% Māori; 7.0% Pasifika; 4.5% Asian; 0.8% Middle Eastern, Latin American and African New Zealanders (MELAA); and 2.2% other, which includes people giving their ethnicity as "New Zealander". English was spoken by 96.4%, Māori by 11.1%, Samoan by 2.2%, and other languages by 7.5%. No language could be spoken by 1.7% (e.g. too young to talk). New Zealand Sign Language was known by 0.3%. The percentage of people born overseas was 12.8, compared with 28.8% nationally.

Religious affiliations were 30.4% Christian, 0.8% Hindu, 2.8% Māori religious beliefs, 0.6% Buddhist, 0.6% New Age, and 2.2% other religions. People who answered that they had no religion were 55.2%, and 7.8% of people did not answer the census question.

Of those at least 15 years old, 150 (16.9%) people had a bachelor's or higher degree, 486 (54.9%) had a post-high school certificate or diploma, and 246 (27.8%) people exclusively held high school qualifications. The median income was $39,400, compared with $41,500 nationally. 45 people (5.1%) earned over $100,000 compared to 12.1% nationally. The employment status of those at least 15 was 438 (49.5%) full-time, 135 (15.3%) part-time, and 27 (3.1%) unemployed.

== Parks ==
Awapuni has three sports grounds: Awapuni Stadium, the Oval Reserve cricket and rugby ground, and Watson Park.

Midway Beach includes a beach, barbecue area, horse riding area, jet skiing area, kite surfing area, dog walking area, and the Kopututea Sand Dunes.

Adventure Playground includes a picnic area and public toilets.

== Education ==
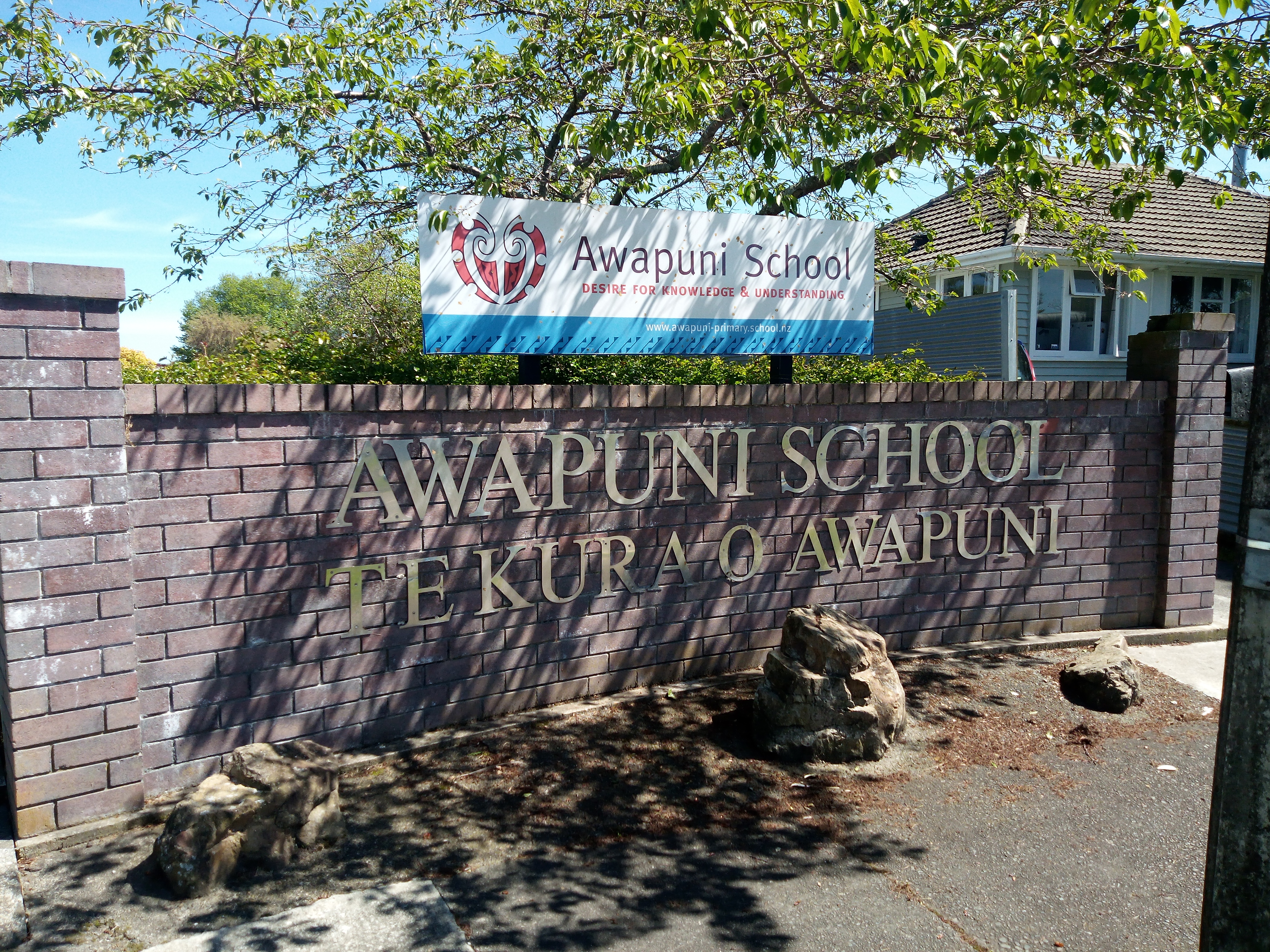
The entrance to Awapuni School as of 2025

Awapuni School is a Year 1–6 co-educational state primary school with a roll of 287 as of March 2026. It opened in 1927.
