= Tindill =

Tindill is a surname. Notable people with the surname include:

- Bert Tindill (1926–1973), English footballer
- Eric Tindill (1910–2010), New Zealand sportsman
- Paul Tindill (born 1939), New Zealand cricketer, son of Eric

== See also ==
- Tindal (disambiguation)
