= Roland Hipkins =

New Zealand painter (1895–1951)

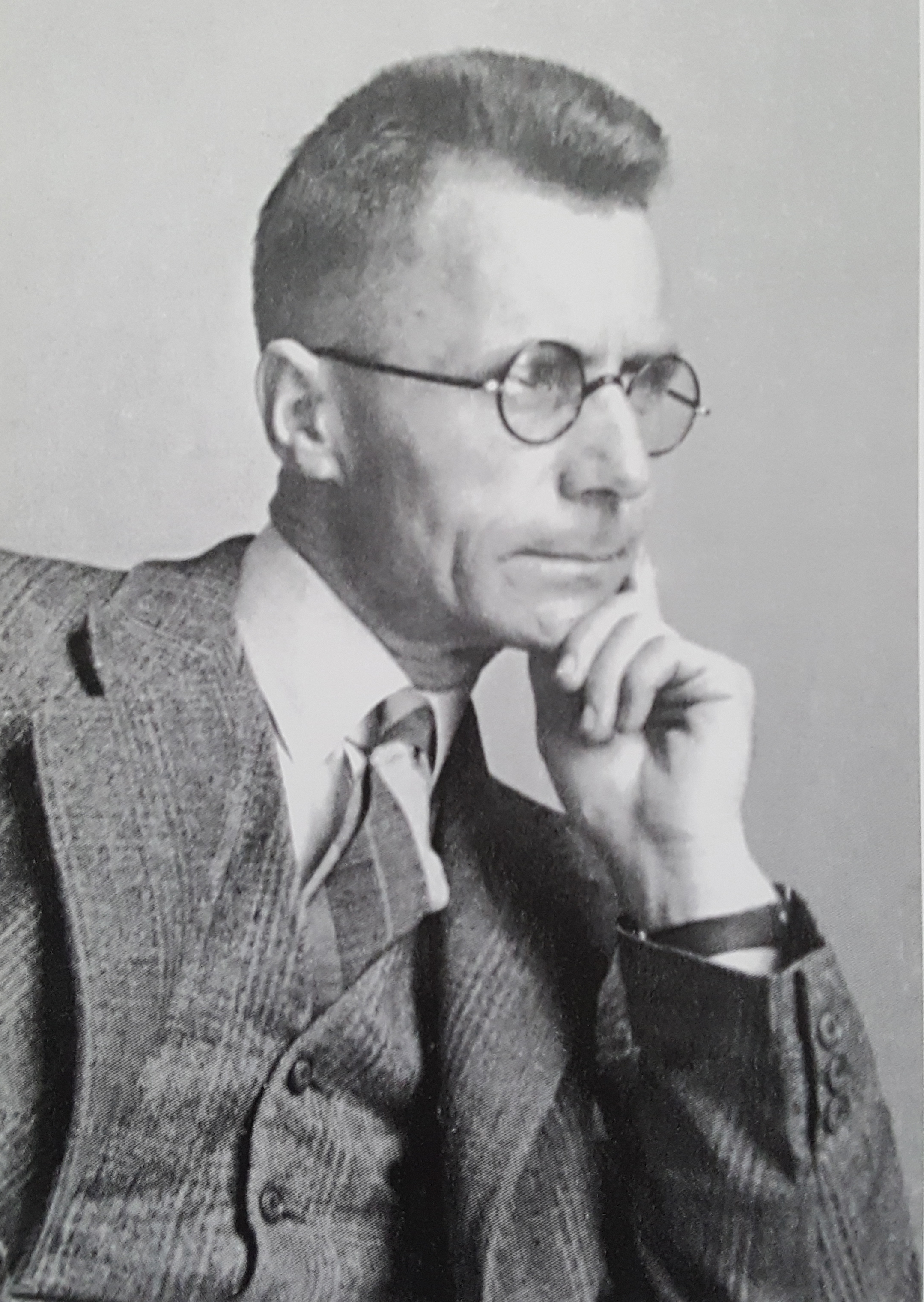
- Hipkins c. 1935
- Born: 1894; Coseley, Staffordshire, England
- Died: 1951 (aged 56–57); Wellington, New Zealand
- Education: Royal College of Art
- Known for: Painting, woodcut, teaching
- Notable work: Renaissance (1932)
- Spouse: Jenny Campbell

Roland Hipkins (1894–1951) was an English artist who worked extensively in New Zealand between 1922 and 1951. He is especially noted for his work done in the wake of the 1931 Hawke's Bay earthquake. Works by Hipkins are held by the Hawkes Bay Cultural Trust, the Royal College of Art in London, and the Sarjeant Art Gallery in Wanganui.

== Education ==
Hipkins was born at Coseley, in the West Midlands of England on 25 November, 1894. He studied at the Bilston School of Art before serving as a soldier in Malta and France between 1915 and 1918. In September 1919, he enrolled at the Royal College of Art, London and in 1921, produced a woodcut titled ‘Mining’ for the student magazine published by the Royal College of Art. After completing his studies in July 1922, he moved to Napier, New Zealand.

== Career ==
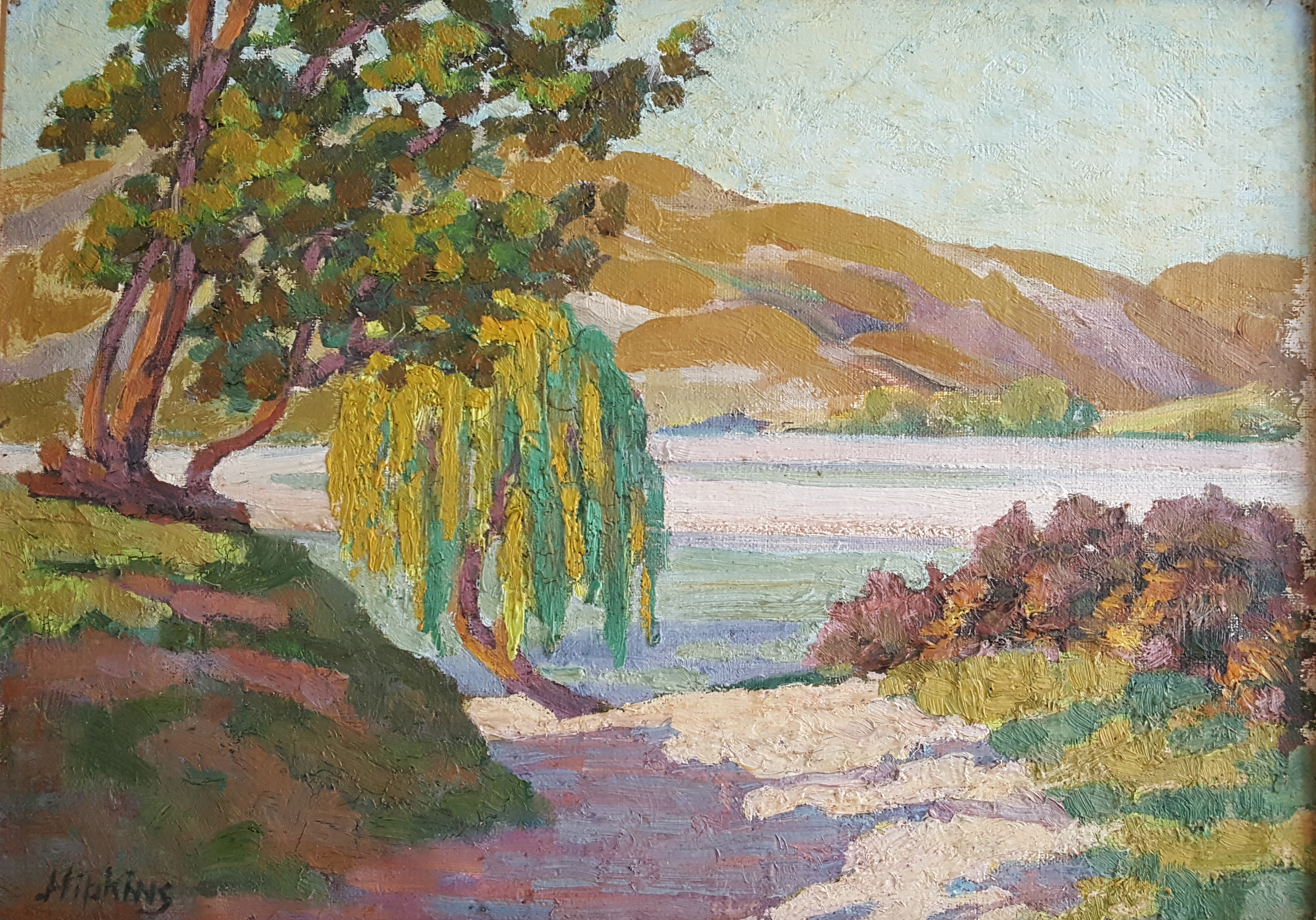
Landscape, New Zealand, Roland Hipkins, c.1935

Hipkins arrived in Napier in 1922, as one of a number of La Trobe artists brought to New Zealand to improve the teaching of art in the country; other artists who came under the scheme included Robert Nettleton Field, Christopher Perkins and Francis Shurrock. Hipkins took up the position of art teacher at the Napier Technical College, and helped establish the Napier Society of Arts and Crafts in 1923.

During his eight-year stay in Napier, he met the Scottish artist Jenny Campbell. They were married on 5 November, 1924, and together they exhibited works at the New Zealand Academy of Fine Arts in 1927. In 1930, the couple moved to Wellington where Hipkins was appointed as an art teacher at the Technical School of Art. In the wake of the Hawkes Bay Earthquake, which decimated Napier in February 1931, Hipkins returned to the town where he made numerous sketches and began work on Renaissance (1932), one of the more important art works to record the event. Renaissance was exhibited at the National Centennial Exhibition of New Zealand Art in 1940.

Hipkins did not produce a large number of finished works over the course of his life and ill health in his final years, further reduced his output. He died in Wellington on 19 May, 1951.

=== Exhibitions ===
Hipkins exhibited with the:

- Canterbury Society of Arts, 46th Annual Exhibition, Christchurch, 1926
- Canterbury Society of Arts, Christchurch, 1932
- Auckland Society of Arts, 56th Annual Exhibition, 1937.
- The New Zealand Academy for Fine Arts, Wellington, Annual Exhibition, 1939.
- Centennial Exhibition of International and New Zealand Art, 1939–1940, National Art Gallery, Wellington.
