= Douglas Dalton =

Douglas Dalton QSO OStJ
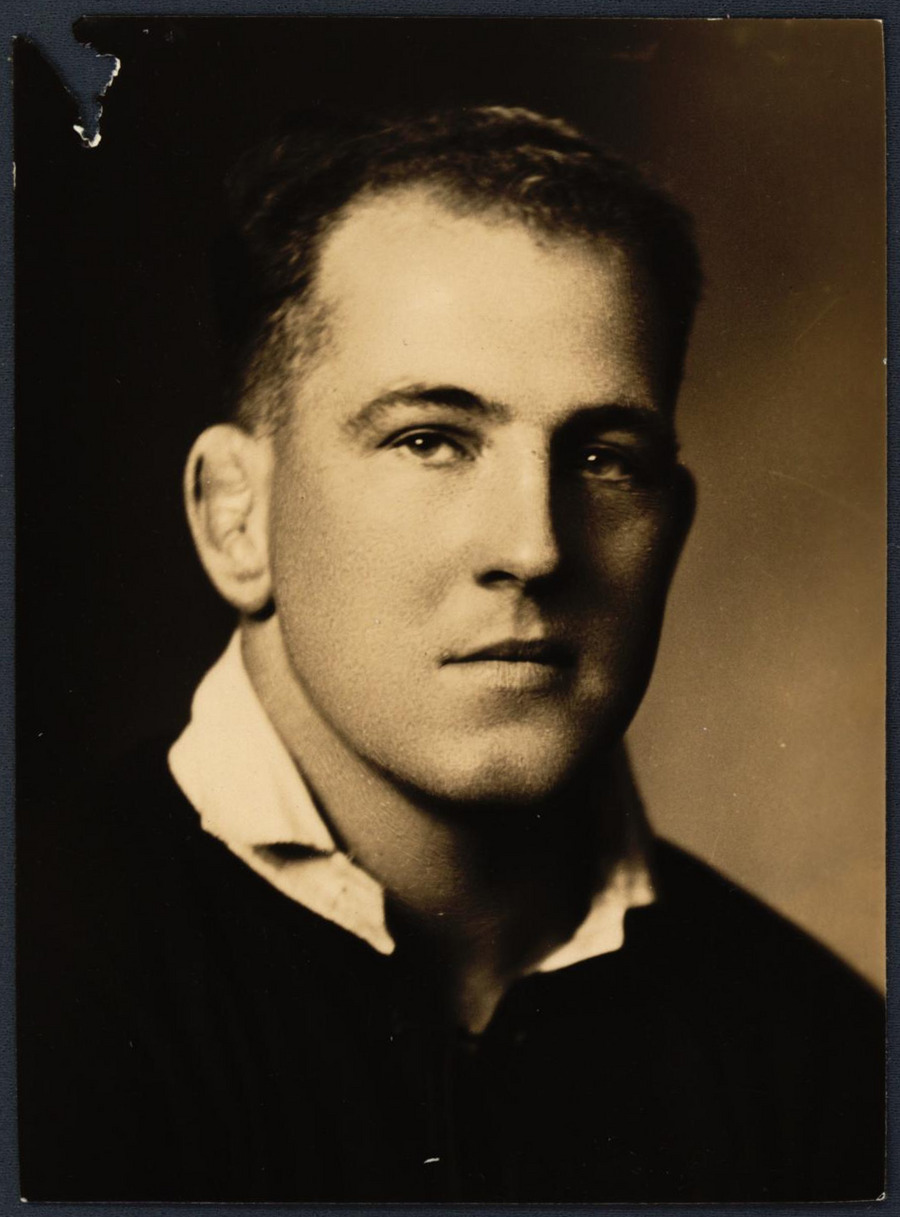
- Dalton in 1935
- Born: 18 January 1913 Napier, New Zealand
- Died: 28 July 1995 (aged 82) Napier, New Zealand
- Height: 1.75 m (5 ft 9 in)
- Weight: 85 kg (187 lb)
- School: Napier Technical College

Rugby union career
- Position(s): Prop; Hooker
Provincial / State sides
Years	Team	Apps	(Points)
1933–1940	Hawke's Bay	41	
International career
Years	Team	Apps	(Points)
1935–1938	New Zealand	9	(0)

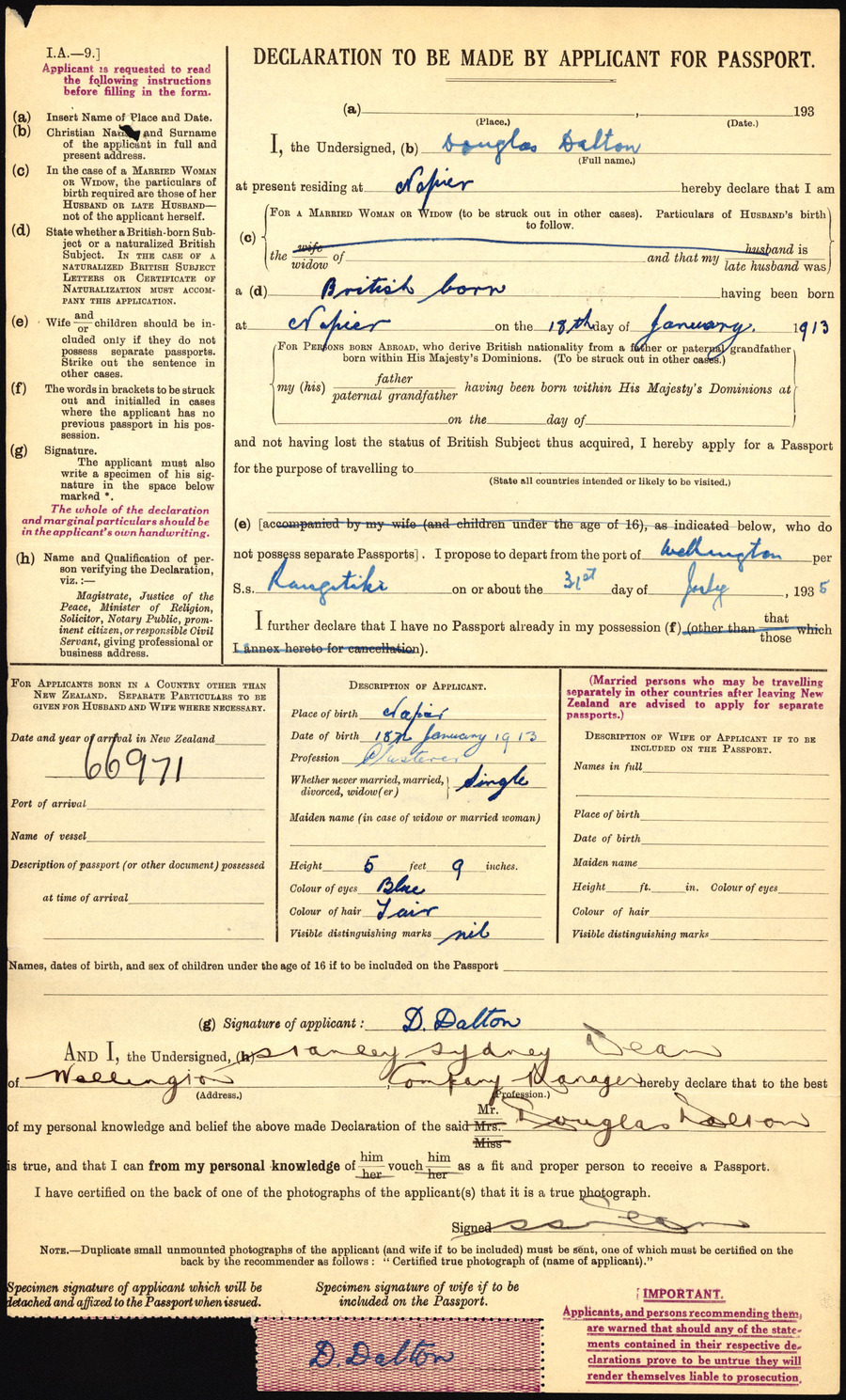
Douglas Dalton passport application (1935)

Douglas Dalton QSO OStJ (18 January 1913 – 28 July 1995) was a New Zealand rugby union player. He was educated at Nelson Park Primary School and then Napier Technical College. A prop and hooker, Dalton represented Hawke's Bay at a provincial level, and was a member of the New Zealand national side, the All Blacks, from 1935 to 1938. He played 21 matches for the All Blacks including nine internationals. He later served as the Hawke's Bay selector between 1946 and 1948, and was also a North Island selector.

Active in the St John's Ambulance Association, Dalton was appointed as a Serving Brother of the Order of St John in 1966, and promoted to Officer of the same order in 1971. He was appointed a Companion of the Queen's Service Order for community service in the 1976 New Year Honours.

Dalton died in Napier on 28 July 1995, and was buried at Taradale Cemetery.
