= Fred Allen (rugby union) =

New Zealand rugby union footballer and coach

Sir Fred Allen KNZM OBE
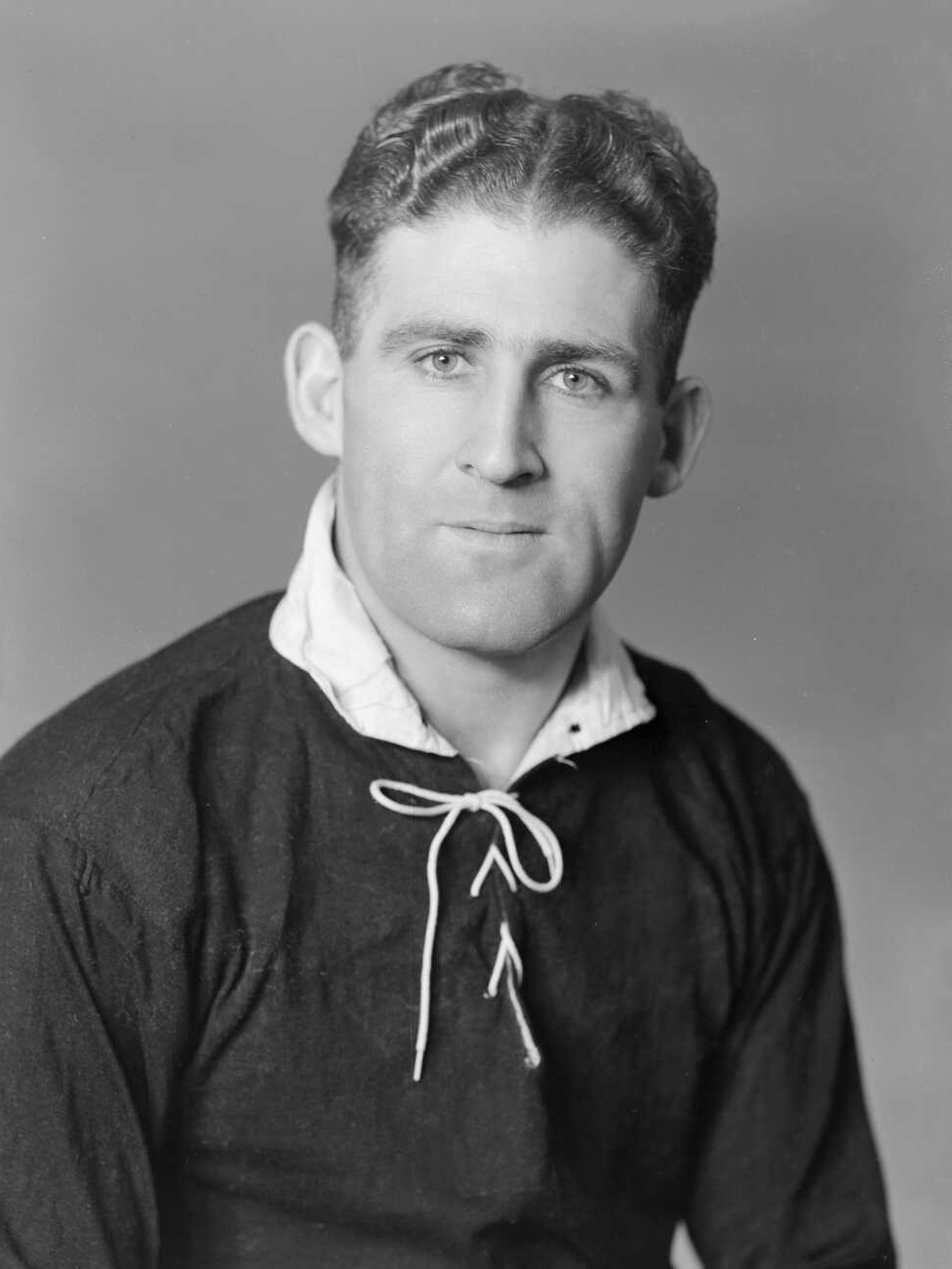
- Allen in 1946
- Born: Frederick Richard Allen; 9 February 1920 Oamaru, New Zealand
- Died: 28 April 2012 (aged 92) Auckland, New Zealand
- Height: 1.78 m (5 ft 10 in)
- Weight: 79 kg (174 lb)
- School: Phillipstown School

Rugby union career
- Position: First five-eighth
Amateur team(s)
Years	Team	Apps	(Points)
1938–41	Linwood		
1946–49	Grammar		
Provincial / State sides
Years	Team	Apps	(Points)
1939–41	Canterbury		
1946–49	Auckland		
1944	Waikato		
1944	Marlborough		
International career
Years	Team	Apps	(Points)
1946–49	New Zealand	6	(0)
1946	2nd NZ Expeditionary Force		
Coaching career
- Years: Team
- 1957–63: Auckland
- 1966–68: New Zealand

Sir Frederick Richard Allen KNZM OBE (9 February 1920 – 28 April 2012) was a captain and coach of the All Blacks, New Zealand's national rugby union team. The All Blacks won all 14 of the test matches they played under his coaching.

== Personal life ==
Allen was born in Oamaru, New Zealand. He was educated in Christchurch. Though he did not attend secondary school, he did attend the Christchurch School of Art for one year. During his education, he played for the Linwood club.

As a schoolboy, Allen also played representative Cricket and Rugby League. He recalled playing Rugby on Fridays, and the Rugby League on Saturdays. He played Cricket for the Canterbury Cricket team for a few games.

During World War II Allen served as a lieutenant in the 27th and 30th Battalions in the Pacific and Italy. He was wounded during his service in the Solomon Islands and again in Italy.

In 1944, between his Pacific and Italian deployments, he trained as a pilot in the New Zealand Airforce. However, he did not actually serve in the airforce due to the maximum age for trainee pilots being lowered from 25 to 21.

When Allen returned to New Zealand he settled in Auckland. Using the lump sum payment received from the government for his wartime service, Allen started a business making belts. He soon expanded the company into a women's clothing manufacturer.

At this time, Allen was offered money to play Rugby League professionally (during this period Rugby League was a professional sport, while Rugby Union was strictly amateur), but turned it down because his true love was Rugby Union.

== Rugby career ==
=== As a player ===
After captaining the Canterbury Colts in 1938, Allen was selected for Canterbury in 1939, making his debut against West Coast in Greymouth. He played for the Canterbury team until WW2 interrupted his career in 1942. At the time of his army call up, he was the Canterbury Captain.

During his army service, Allen played for service teams including the 1945-46 2nd NZEF "Kiwis" Army team that toured Britain and played in the 1945–46 Victory Internationals following the war. He also played one game for Waikato and one game for Marlborough, both in 1944, while stationed at the Woodbourne Blenheim Air Force training course.

After his return to New Zealand, Allen played for Auckland Grammar Old Boys 1946–48, and in 1946 was selected for the Auckland provincial team, the North Island team, and finally the All Blacks. He was appointed Captain for his debut international as an All Black, against the Australians at Carrisbrook in Dunedin. The Australians were in New Zealand for the 1946 Australia rugby union tour of New Zealand, and Allen captained the All Blacks for both tests.

In 1949 he was selected as captain of the All Blacks for the 1949 tour to South Africa. Although each test match was very close, the All Blacks lost the series 4–0. Allen retired from playing after the series.

Allen returned to make one final appearance as a player in the 1950 Barbarians team which beat Auckland 49-16.

=== As a coach ===
After retiring as a player, Allen went on to coach. After coaching the Auckland Grammar club for several years, he was appointed as Auckland Coach in 1957.

Allen was a selector-coach for Auckland during their Ranfurly Shield era of the late 1950s, with the Auckland team winning the shield from Southland in 1959. The team then lost the shield to North Auckland after two defences, before winning it back later in 1960. They then held it for 25 successful defences until losing to Wellington in 1963 - a record number of defences at the time. After losing the shield, Allen finally retired as Auckland coach. He had wanted to do some for some time but had stayed on to fulfil his 1959 promise to remain coach until Auckland lost the shield.

Allen became an All Blacks selector in 1964, as well as the coach of the North Island team. He later become All Blacks coach in 1966, just in time to coach them to an unbeaten series victory against the Lions in New Zealand, before departing on the similarly successful 1967 All Black tour of Britain, France, and Canada.

A fierce but very effective coach, Allen picked up the nickname of "The Needle". The All Blacks' reign under Allen was the team's most successful; they won all 14 of their tests with him as coach. Allen’s approach to the game was to run an all-attack, 15-man game. At first this caused some controversy, but his critics were unable to argue with the results.

=== As Auckland union president ===
Allen served as the Auckland Rugby Union president from 1972-74.

== Honours ==
In the 1991 New Year Honours, Allen was appointed an Officer of the Order of the British Empire (OBE) for services to rugby.

The New Zealand Rugby Football Union awarded Allen the Steinlager Salver in 2002. Allen is the only person to have been separately inducted into the New Zealand Sporting Hall of fame as both a player and a coach, and in 2005 was inducted into the International Rugby Hall of Fame.

In the 2010 Queen's Birthday Honours, he was appointed a Knight Companion of the New Zealand Order of Merit (KNZM), also for services to rugby.

Following the death of Morrie McHugh on 25 September 2010, Allen had been the oldest living All Black.

== Death ==
Allen developed leukaemia and died on 28 April 2012. He had moved into full-time care in Orewa on the Hibiscus Coast, north of Auckland.

== All Blacks statistics ==
Tests: 6 (6 as Captain)
Games: 15 (15 as Captain)
Total Matches: 21 (21 as Captain)
Test Points: 0pts
Game Points: 21pts (7t, 0c, 0p, 0dg, 0m)
Total Points: 21pts (7t, 0c, 0p, 0dg, 0m)

== Notes and references ==
Fred the Needle: the untold story of Sir Fred Allen the authorised biography by Alan Sayers and Les Watkins (2011. Auckland, Hodder Moa)

Sporting positions
Preceded by Ronald Bush	All Blacks coach 1966–1968	Succeeded by Ivan Vodanovich
Records
Preceded by Morrie McHugh	Oldest living All Black; 25 September 2010 – 28 April 2012	Succeeded by Bob Scott
