= Phillippe Cabot =

NZ international rugby union player

- Born: Phillippe Sidney de Quetteville Cabot; 18 July 1900 Rough Ridge, New Zealand
- Died: 12 December 1998 (aged 98) Totnes, Devon, England
- School: Timaru Boys' High School
- Occupation: Management consultant

Rugby union career
- Position: Wing-forward
Provincial / State sides
Years	Team	Apps	(Points)
1920	South Canterbury	3	
1921	Otago	1	
International career
Years	Team	Apps	(Points)
1921	New Zealand	1	(0)

Phillippe Sidney de Quetteville Cabot (18 July 1900 – 12 December 1998) was a New Zealand rugby union player. A wing-forward, Cabot represented South Canterbury and Otago at a provincial level, and was a member of the New Zealand national side, the All Blacks, in 1921. He left the field injured in his only match for the All Blacks, against New South Wales in Christchurch.

Following the death of Johnstone Richardson in 1994, Cabot was the oldest living All Black.

Records
Preceded by Johnstone Richardson	Oldest living All Black; 28 October 1994 – 12 December 1998	Succeeded by Ray Williams
