= Snow Bowman =

New Zealand rugby union player (1915–1992)

- Born: Albert William Bowman; 5 May 1915 Auckland, New Zealand
- Died: 20 January 1992 (aged 76) Waipukurau, New Zealand
- Height: 1.88 m (6 ft 2 in)
- Weight: 93 kg (205 lb)
- School: Napier Technical College

Rugby union career
- Position: Flanker
Provincial / State sides
Years	Team	Apps	(Points)
1936–39, 1947	Hawke's Bay		
1941, 1945	Wellington		
1946	Nelson		
International career
Years	Team	Apps	(Points)
1938	New Zealand	3	(6)

Albert William "Snow" Bowman (5 May 1915 – 20 January 1992) was a New Zealand rugby union player. A flanker, Bowman represented Hawke's Bay, Wellington, and Nelson at a provincial level, and also appeared in services teams during World War II. He was a member of the New Zealand national side, the All Blacks, on their 1938 tour of Australia. playing in six matches including three internationals.

He was selected as one of the five players of the year for the 1945 season in the Rugby Almananac of New Zealand.

Bowman died in Waipukurau on 20 January 1992, and his ashes were buried at Waipukurau Cemetery.
