= Hastings Clock Tower =

Clocktower in New Zealand

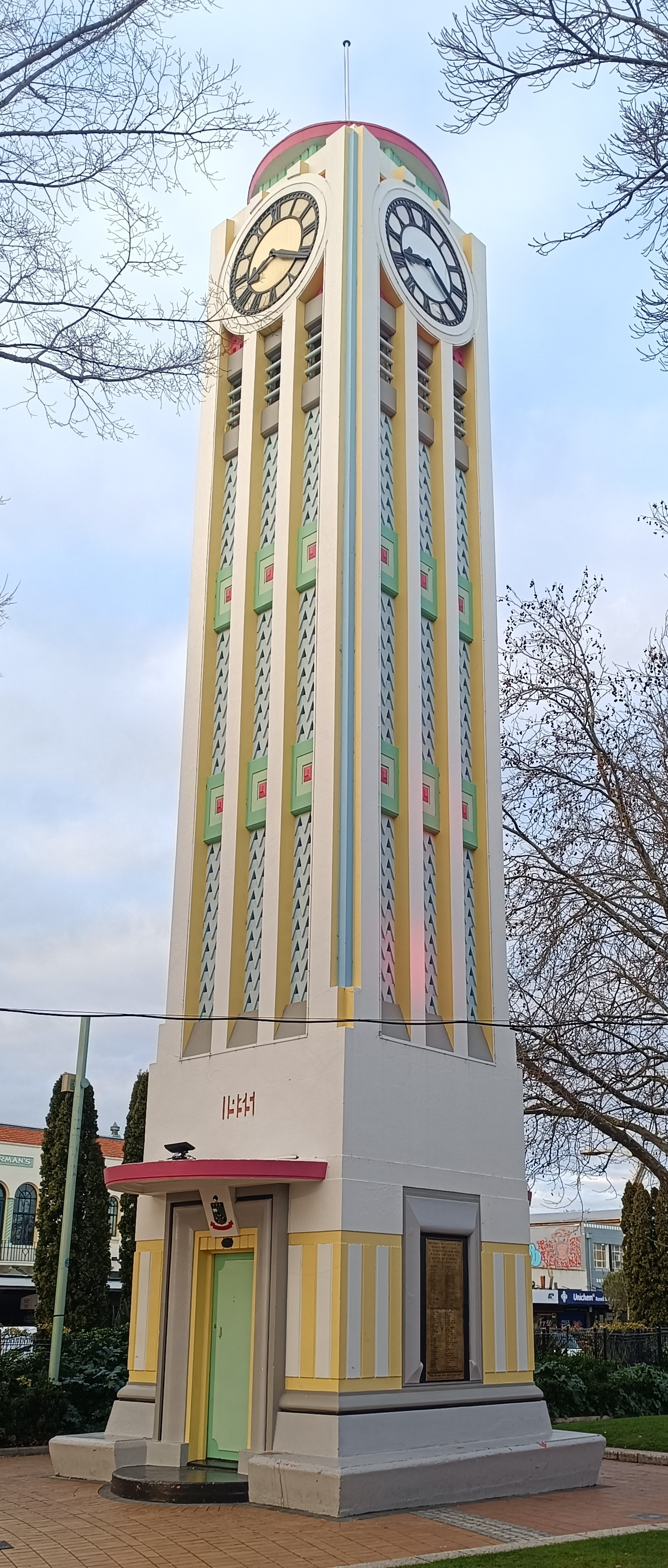
- Clock tower in 2024
- Interactive map of the Hastings Clock Tower area

General information
- Type: Clock tower
- Architectural style: Art Deco
- Location: Russell Street South, Hastings, New Zealand
- Coordinates: 39°38′31.30″S 176°50′34.60″E
- Opened: 1935
- Cost: £1226

Technical details
- Material: Plastered reinforced concrete

Design and construction
- Architect: Sidney Chaplin
- Main contractor: A. Hampton

Heritage New Zealand – Category 1
- Designated: 6 June 2005
- Reference no.: 1075

The Hastings Clock Tower is a public landmark in the New Zealand city of Hastings. Designed by Sidney George Chaplin, and erected in 1935, the tower is located in the Hastings central business district alongside the Palmerston North-Gisborne railway line adjacent to the intersection of Heretaunga Street and Russell Street. The clock tower was designed as a symbol of recovery from the 1931 Hawke's Bay earthquake and was not intended as a memorial; however, in 1995, brass plaques were added to the tower in memory of those who died in the earthquake.

== History ==
In 1934, the Hastings Borough Council ran a national competition inviting designs for a clock tower to enhance the town's aesthetic beauty and restore a familiar sound, which people missed after the 1931 Hawke's Bay earthquake, of the old town clock striking the Westminster Quarter chimes every quarter hour. A young Hastings architect, Sidney George Chaplin, won the competition and supervised the erection of the tower facing Heretaunga Street adjacent to the railway crossing in the centre of Hastings.

The judges of the design competition were local architects Harold Davies (1886–1976) and Eric Phillips (1897–1980), whose firm Davies & Phillips was responsible for designing the majority of Hastings' rebuild. Davies & Phillips had extensive correspondence with William Gummer, at that time president of the New Zealand Institute of Architects, about the dangers of demeaning competitions with inadequate prize money. Sidney Chaplin was awarded 25 guineas as first prize winner for his clock tower design.

The tower cost £1,126 to build, which was more than the Hastings Borough Council had intended. However, those excavating the site struck old, underground wells and a site further back had to be permanently leased from the Railways Department. A 'Gents Electric turret striking and chiming clock', otherwise known as a turret clock, was procured from W. Littlejohns and Co. Ltd. in Wellington, and the chimes were salvaged from the debris of the Hastings Post Office tower that was destroyed in the 1931 earthquake.

Mayor George Roach was keen to see the old clock tower chimes reused despite their crashing down to the street during the collapse of the tower. The destroyed post office had been opened in October 1911 and was a neo-classical design in red brick, with a turret clock and chimes donated by local solicitor E. H. Williams. The clock was named "Big Ben" in reference to the Westminster Quarter chimes from London.

The council were "eminently satisfied with the completed result" but the proprietor of the Hastings Hotel across the road complained that his guests would be kept awake by the quarterly chimes through the night, so the chimes were timed to turn off at 11:00pm. The new landmark of "low earthquake-fearing buildings" symbolised hopes and expectations of renewed progress and prosperity.

== Description ==
The Hastings Clock Tower is an excellent example of mid-1930s Art Deco Moderne. The tower is square in plan, and at street level there is a recessed door indicating the tower frontage. At the rear is a niche, and either side are two plaques installed in 1995 to memorialise those who died in the 1931 earthquake. The base is formed to allow for seating and congregation around the tower.

The front door is capped with the coat of arms for the Borough of Hastings, surmounted with a semi-circular verandah. Incised above the verandah is the date 1935.

There are three intermediate steps to the main part of the tower with three tiers of patterned infill panels and above them are louvres and the faces of the clock. The infill panels between the stripped columns have a strong saw-tooth design pointing upwards accelerating the height of the tower, with speed stripes in each of the four corners of the tower. It is neatly capped with a circular flat round disk for a roof, matching the four circular clock faces of the turret. The tower is surmounted with a flagpole, which for many decades the tower flew a flag that symbolised Hastings as the fruit bowl of New Zealand.

As the most prominent landmark of Hastings, the clock tower has become iconic as a symbol for the city, being recreated and represented in ephemera, merchandise, and commemorative memorabilia.

In recognition of its historical importance, the Hastings Town Clock has a Category 1 listing with Heritage New Zealand.

In 2022 the tower received a façade colour palette change to pastels of greens, pink, yellow and blue. The façade enhancement further emphasizes the ornamental Art Deco beauty of the tower.

== 1931 earthquake memorial plaques ==
The Hastings Clock Tower was commissioned as a symbol of triumph over adversity to commemorate the rebuild of Hastings following the 1931 Hawke's Bay earthquake. Although not intended to be an official earthquake memorial, the clock tower has become the central identity for the earthquake, where annual memorial services have taken place on 3 February.

The memorial element of the clock tower was formalised in 1995 when two brass plaques were added to the base of the tower. The plaques alphabetically list the names of 98 people who died during the earthquake with the names split across the two plaques.

The plaques carry the wording:

THIS PLAQUE WAS ERECTED BY THE
HASTINGS DISTRICT COUNCIL
TO THE MEMORY OF THOSE PEOPLE
WHO LOST THEIR LIVES IN THE
EARTHQUAKE AT HASTINGS
ON 3RD OF FEBRUARY 1931

"Their sun went down before it was noon"

== Gallery ==
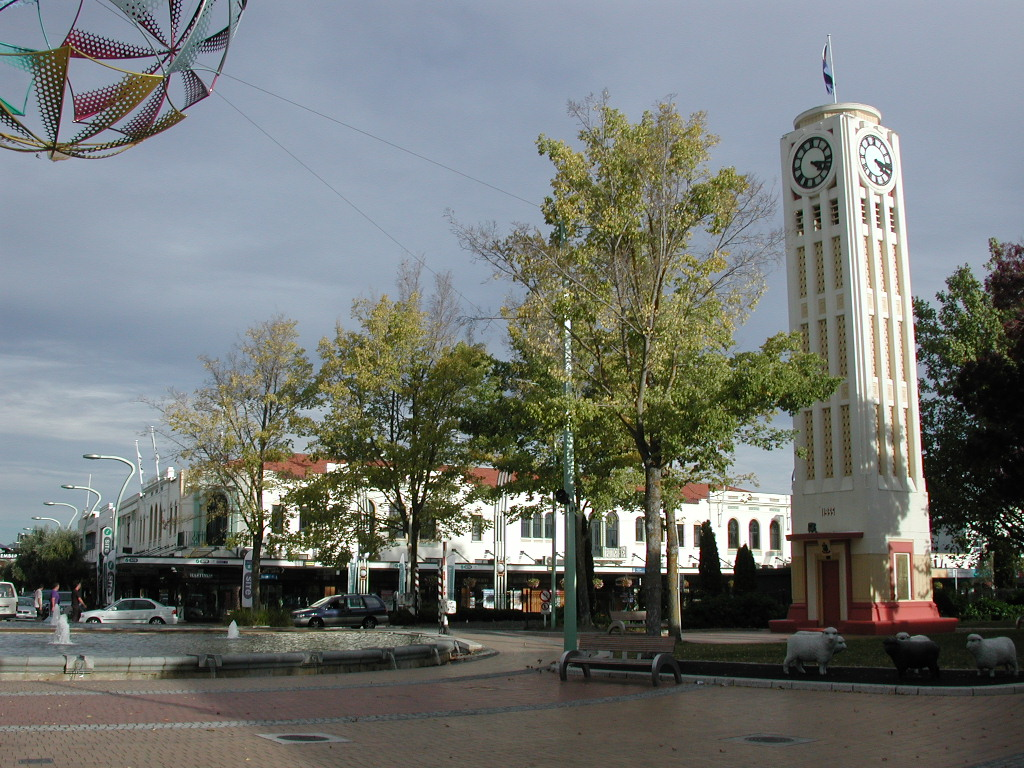
Hastings City Mall with clock tower

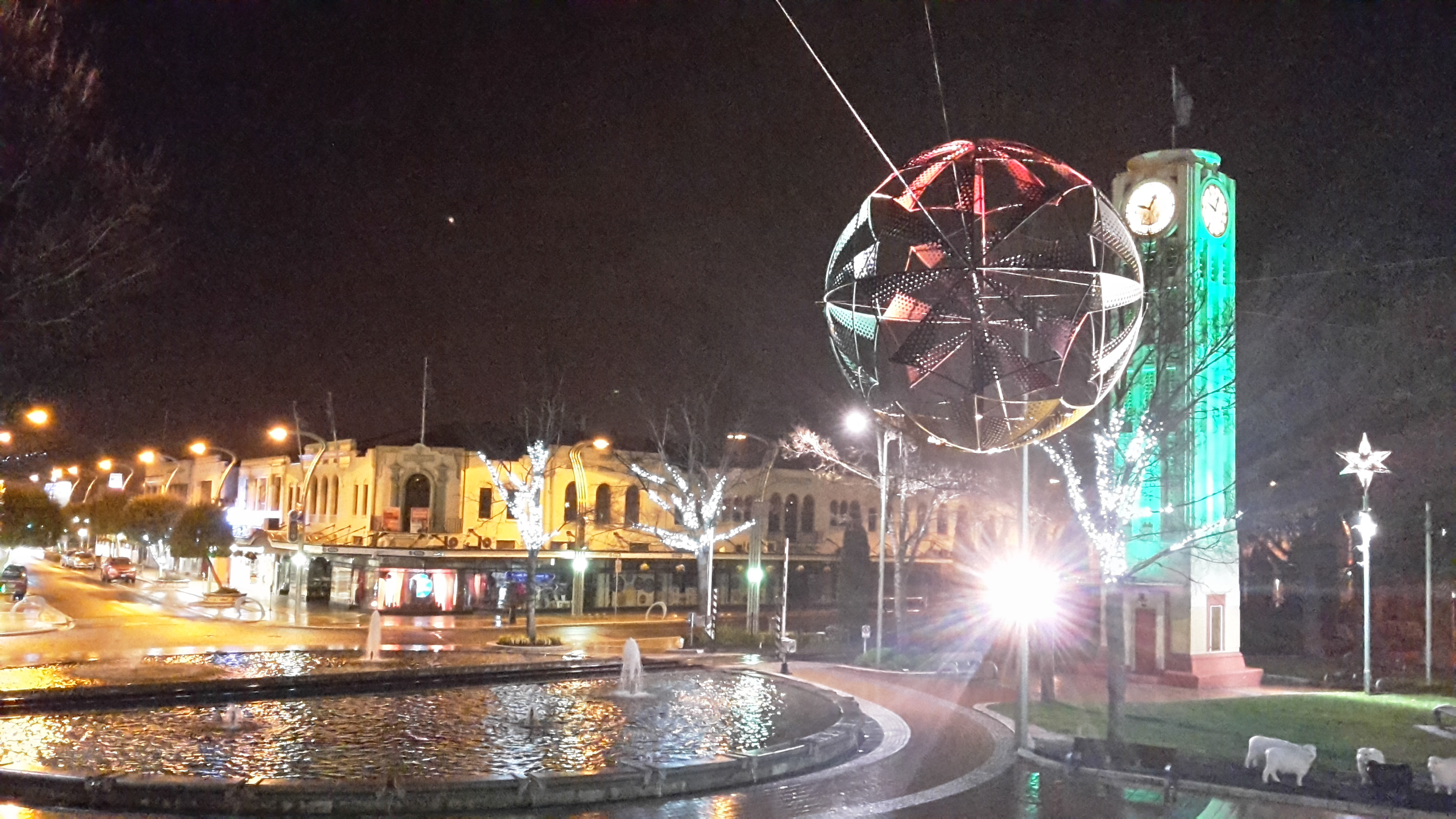
Clock tower at night

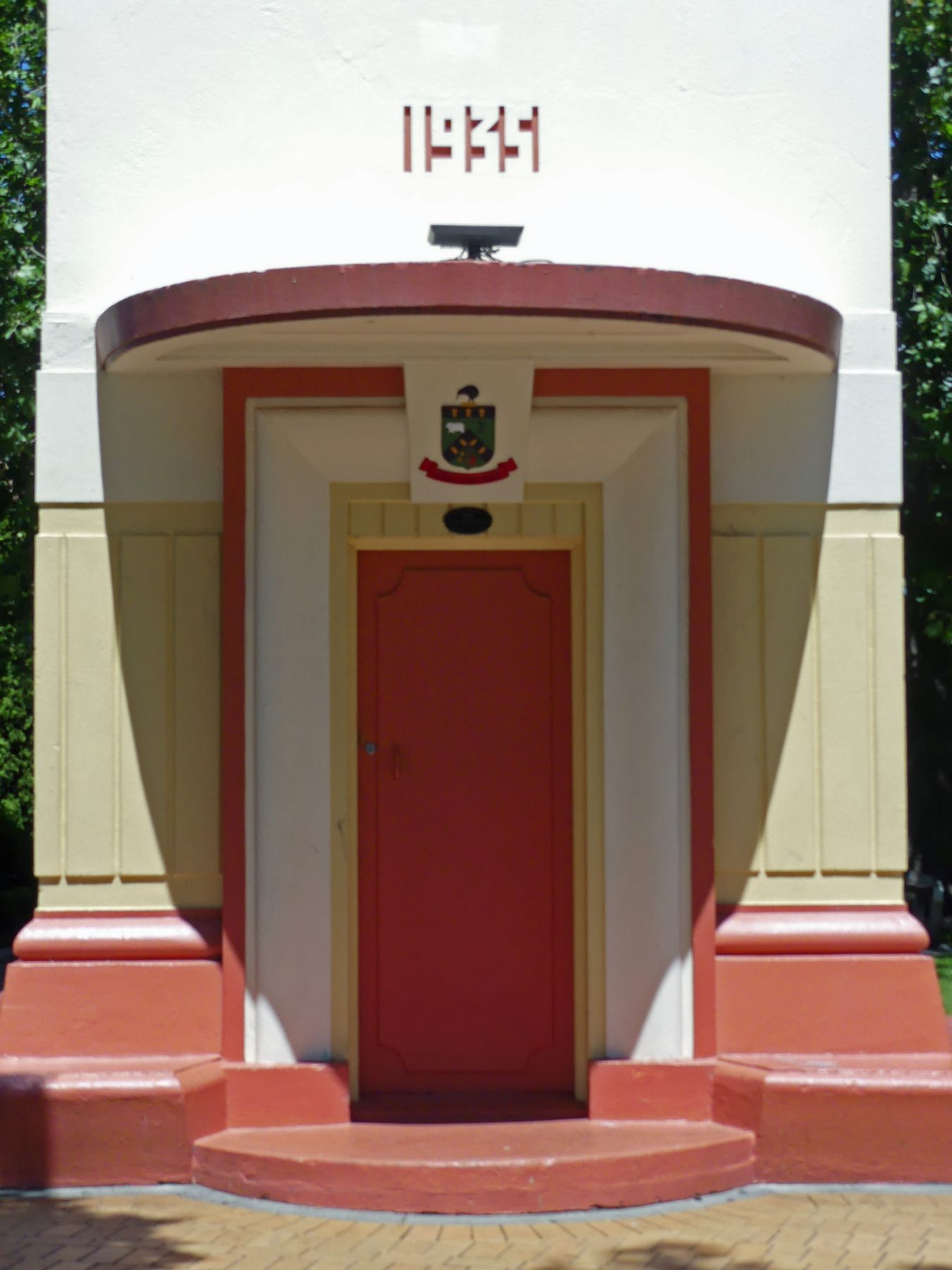
Clock tower doorway with Hastings Borough Council coat of arms and the date 1935
