= Jenny Campbell (artist) =

Scottish artist (1895–1970)

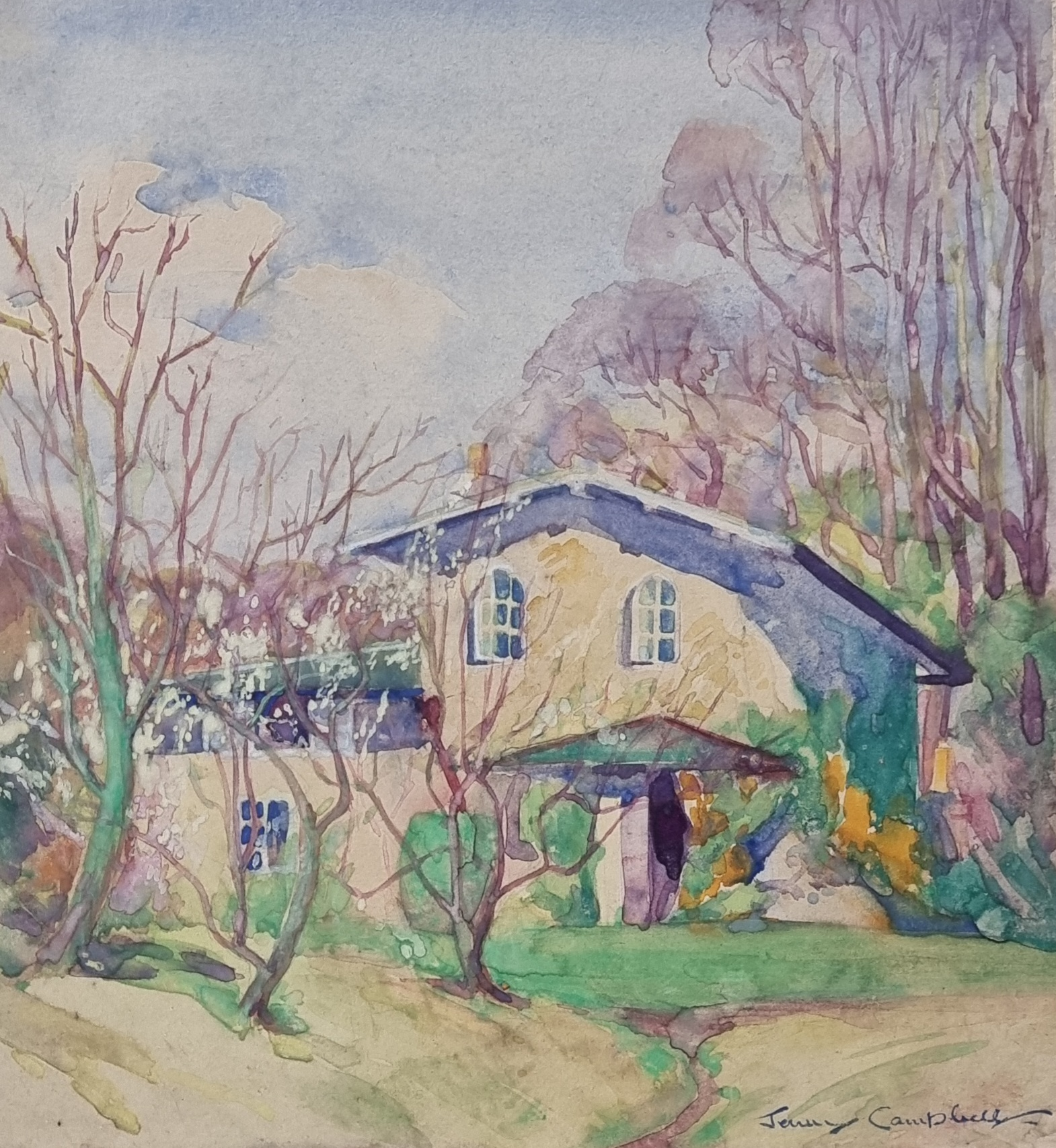
- House in landscape, Jenny Campbell, c.1920
- Born: Jenny D. A. Campbell; 1895; Ayr, Scotland
- Died: 1970 (aged 74–75); Melbourne, Australia
- Known for: Painting
- Spouse: Roland Hipkins

Jenny D. A. Campbell (1895–1970) was a Scottish artist. Works by Campbell are held at the Auckland Art Gallery Toi o Tāmaki and the Museum of New Zealand Te Papa Tongarewa. Her prints are featured in Margaret Dobson's book Block-Cutting and Print-Making by Hand (1928).

Born in Ayr, Scotland, Campbell moved to New Zealand in 1922 with fellow artist Roland Hipkins. Campbell married Hipkins in 1923 and they settled in Napier and then Wellington.

== Education ==
Campbell trained at the Edinburgh College of Art and was awarded a Diploma. After receiving a travel scholarship, she also studied in Belgium, Holland, and France.

== Career ==
Campbell worked mainly in oils, specifically portraiture and landscapes. She also worked with colour-block printing, including linocuts. Works by Campbell include: Two Boys with Kites (1924) and Lake Taupo.

=== Exhibitions ===
Campbell exhibited with the:

- Auckland Society of Arts
- Canterbury Society of Arts
- New Zealand Academy of Fine Arts
- Otago Art Society
- The Group in 1933, 1934, 1938 (as a guest artist, alongside her husband Ronald Hipkins)
