= Ray Williams (rugby union, born 1909) =

- Born: Raymond Norman Williams; 25 April 1909 Taradale, New Zealand
- Died: 8 October 2001 (aged 92) Harare, Zimbabwe
- Height: 1.74 m (5 ft 9 in)
- Weight: 61 kg (134 lb)
- School: Napier Technical College
- University: Canterbury University College
- Occupation: Civil engineer

Rugby union career
- Position: Wing
Provincial / State sides
Years	Team	Apps	(Points)
1930–31	Canterbury		
International career
Years	Team	Apps	(Points)
1932	New Zealand	0	(0)

Raymond Norman Williams (25 April 1909 – 8 October 2001) was a New Zealand rugby union player. A wing, Williams represented Canterbury at a provincial level, and was a member of the New Zealand national side, the All Blacks, in 1932. He played one match for the All Blacks, against Wellington, but was injured and never played first-class rugby again.

Following the death of Phillippe Cabot in 1998, Williams was the oldest living All Black.

Records
Preceded by Phillippe Cabot	Oldest living All Black; 12 December 1998 – 8 October 2001	Succeeded by Eric Tindill
