= Don Cleverley =

New Zealand cricketer

- Cleverley in 1931

Personal information
- Full name: Donald Charles Cleverley
- Born: 23 December 1909; Oamaru, Otago, New Zealand
- Died: 16 February 2004 (aged 94); Southport, Queensland, Australia
- Batting: Left-handed
- Bowling: Right-arm fast-medium
- Role: Bowler

International information
- National side: New Zealand (1932–1946)
- Test debut (cap 21): 27 February 1932 v South Africa
- Last Test: 29 March 1946 v Australia

Career statistics
Competition	Test	First-class
Matches	2	30
Runs scored	19	159
Batting average	19.00	5.29
100s/50s	0/0	0/0
Top score	10*	16*
Balls bowled	222	6,805
Wickets	0	99
Bowling average	–	29.08
5 wickets in innings	–	3
10 wickets in match	–	0
Best bowling	–	8/75
Catches/stumpings	0/–	14/–
- Source: Cricinfo, 1 April 2017

Donald Charles Cleverley (23 December 1909 – 16 February 2004) was a New Zealand Test cricketer. Cleverley played in two Tests for the New Zealand national cricket team, 14 years apart, but failed to take a wicket in either match.

== Domestic career ==
Born in Oamaru in Otago, Cleverley was a right-arm fast-medium bowler and left-handed batsman. Cleverley played domestic first-class cricket for Auckland over 21 seasons, from 1930/31 to 1951/52, before playing a final season in 1952–53 for Central Districts. He also played for Piako against the touring MCC side in February 1936, and for Taranaki against Nelson in the Hawke Cup in December 1952.

== International career ==
Cleverley played in New Zealand's inaugural Test match against South Africa, at Christchurch in February 1932. Cleverley bowled 22 overs without success and scored 10* and 7 with the bat, and New Zealand were beaten by an innings and 12 runs.

He also played in the notorious one-off Test against Australia at Wellington in March 1946, New Zealand's first Test against Australia. Electing to bat first on a rain-affected pitch, New Zealand were bowled out for 42 inside two hours on the first morning. Australia scored runs as the pitch dried out, and ended the day at 149–3, but lost quick wickets after they resumed on a damp wicket the next morning and declared on 199–8. This was more than sufficient, and New Zealand were bowled out for 54 inside another two hours, to lose by an innings and 103 runs. Cleverley bowled 15 overs without taking a wicket, and was the not-out batsman on one run in each innings. After this debacle, which highlighted the gap in quality between the sides, Australia and New Zealand did not play against each other in Test cricket until 1973.

== Trivia ==
Cleverley holds the record for the longest time between the last dismissal and end of a Test match career – 14 years and 29 days (1 March 1932 to 30 March 1946).

On the death of M. J. Gopalan in 2003, Cleverley became the oldest living Test cricketer. He died in Southport, Queensland at the age of 94, and he was succeeded as the oldest living Test cricketer by his compatriot Eric Tindill, who also played in the Test match against Australia in 1946.

Preceded by M. J. Gopalan	Oldest Living Test Cricketer; 21 December 2003 – 16 February 2004	Succeeded by Eric Tindill
