= Napier Technical College, New Zealand =

Defunct school in New Zealand

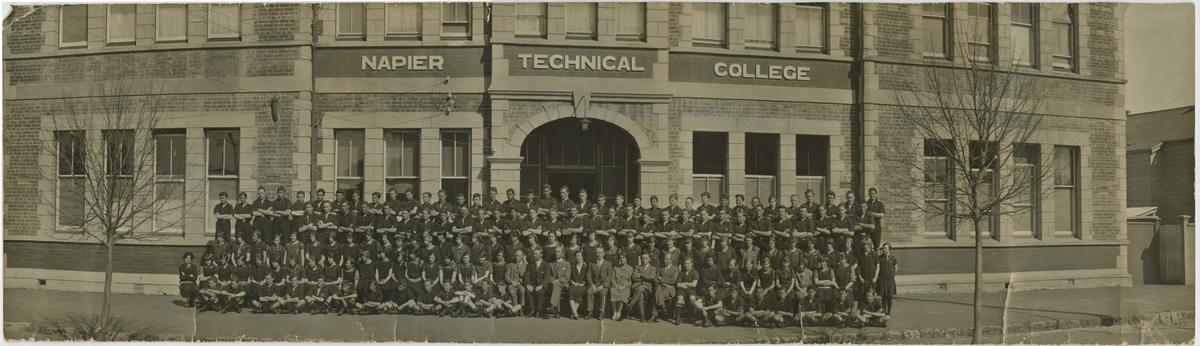
- Students and staff in front of the college, c. 1925

Location
- Napier; New Zealand; 39°29′35″S 176°54′50″E

Information
- School type: Technical
- Motto: Latin: Laborare est Orare (To work is to pray)
- Established: 1909
- Closed: 1931
- Principal: Walter Fossey
- Principal: I. E. Newton (1917)
- Principal: Robert McLaren (1923/1924–1931)
- Gender: Coeducational

Napier Technical College was a technical education college in Napier, New Zealand. Established in 1909, it provided general secondary education during the day and trade skills in the evening. After the 1931 Hawke's Bay earthquake caused severe damage to the technical college's buildings and killed nine students, the school was disestablished and amalgamated into Napier Boys' High School and Napier Girls' High School.

Before the earthquake, the technical college suffered overcrowding due to increasing enrolments and a lack of space to erect new buildings. Consequently, development of a new site in Napier began in 1930, but due to the earthquake, the move there was never completed. Napier Intermediate School now occupies the site.

== History ==
Napier Technical College was established in 1909, replacing the Technical Institute. It taught both boys and girls, which provided general secondary education during the day, and taught trade skills during night school. In 1908 the technical college had an enrolment of 80 students. An example of a class held in the technical college was one that taught machine sheep-shearing, wool sorting and classing.

The engineering department building of the technical college was completed in 1911. Four years later in 1915, after a £250 grant and a £660 tender, The Honourable Josiah Hanan opened the technical college's gymnasium which also served as a social hall. The electric work and lighting was done by the students.

By 1923 the technical college had an enrolment of 250 students and taught classes including agriculture, engineering, home science and commercial. That year, due to regulations, a third of the board was randomly selected to step down.

With an increasing enrolment from 80 in 1908 to 256 in 1919, the technical college started to become overcrowded. Because of this, it had to start teaching classes of students in practical classrooms rather than using them for physical training. There was no room to erect more buildings as the technical college was on a quarter acre section.

In 1919 architect Louis Hay was appointed to design a new college building. The Napier Borough Council later decided that it would donate land, adjoin properties and close a road, making the site for the technical college approximately five acres. After what was described as a "standstill" in 1925, in August 1929 the Minister of Education approved a grant for building the first part of the new college. After a delay, the foundation stone was laid on 18 August 1930 by Minister of Education the Honourable Harry Atmore. In January 1931 the first part of the new building was described as almost complete. The technical college was never moved to this building due to the 1931 Hawke's Bay earthquake. It was two storeys high and had red bricks.

On 1 March 1931 the technical college had an enrolment of 1008, of which 605 were boys and 403 were girls.

== Earthquake ==
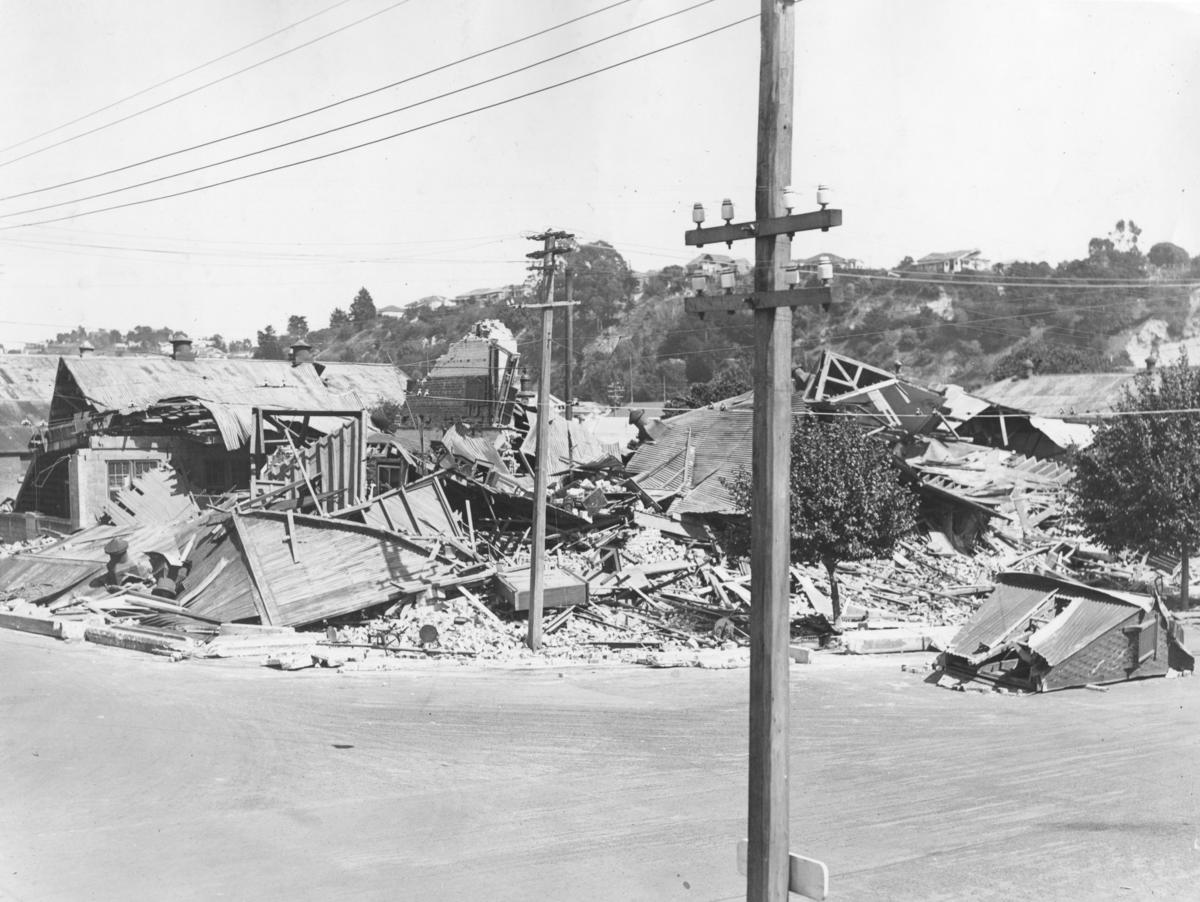
The collapsed college after the earthquake

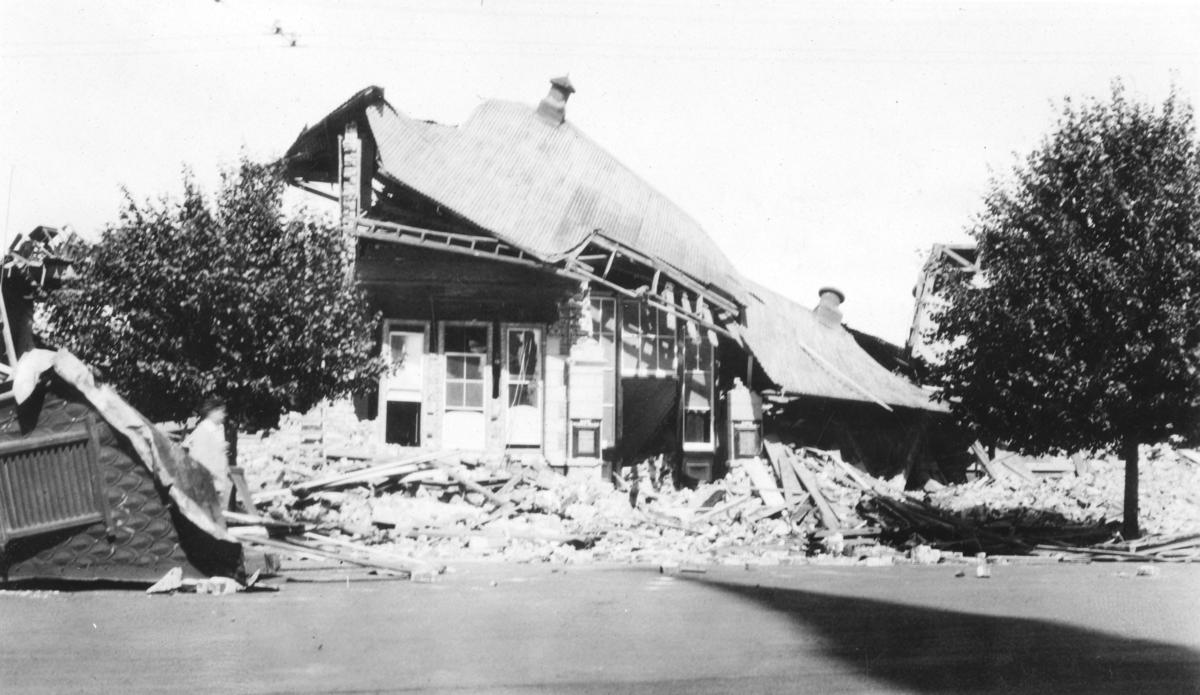
The collapsed college after the earthquake

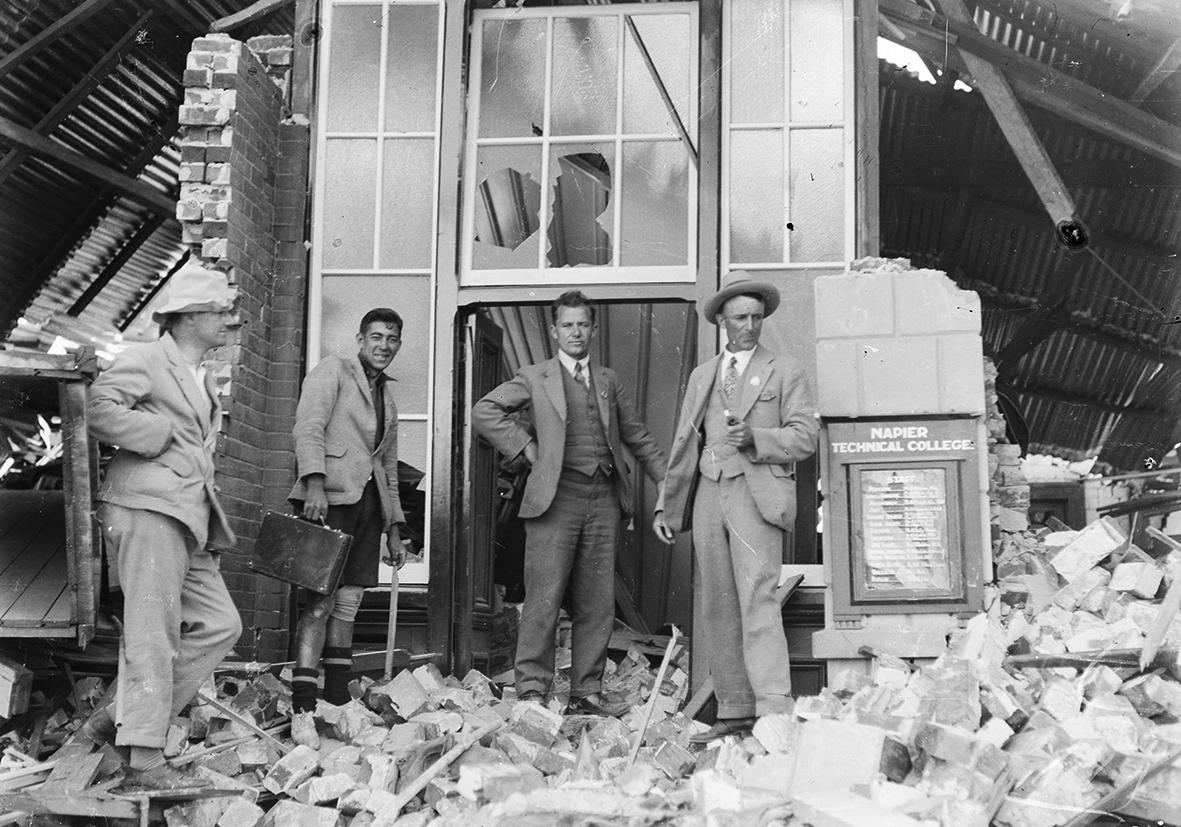
Inside the damaged college. The second man from the left was a student.

On 3 February 1931, the magnitude 7.8 Hawke's Bay earthquake occurred, destroying the technical college and killing nine students. (Note: The students who died were Frederick James Grant, Clifford Colvin Heath, Geoffrey Cole Knott, Rose Eileen Leverett, Irvine McMillan, Bertram Ogilvie, Lloyd Rhodes, Raymond Claude Robertson, and Irvine Thomas Stead. "H B Heritage News" (PDF). historicplacesaotearoa.govt.nz. 1 May 2014.) The first earthquake caused parts of the outer brick walls to fall out onto the street, and the second earthquake caused the first floor to collapse on the ground floor classrooms. The earthquake occurred after recess on the first day of the school year. It took two hours to get the students out, with some senior boys going back into the classrooms to rescue trapped classmates.

After the earthquakes, several teachers were moved to other schools in the country, and students were temporarily taught by the principal under a marquee in Nelson Park. The technical college was never rebuilt. Despite opposition and lobbying from the board of directors, the minister of education disestablished Napier Technical College and amalgamated it with Napier Boys' High School and Napier Girls' High School, which were the technical college's rivals.

In 1935 a proposal was made to place a memorial on the technical college's former land to remember the students who died there.

== Legacy ==
In 1921 the cricket club Napier Technical College Old Boys was started, which still runs to this day, now named Napier Technical Old Boys. The technical college's band also still exists, now named the Napier Technical Memorial Band. Napier Technical College was the first day-school to have a band.

In 1960 New Zealand artist Rita Angus created a mural in the Napier Girls' High School to remember the earthquake and merger between the two schools. It has Napier Technical College's crest, uniform, and motto, which was Laborare est Orare, meaning "to work is to pray".

In May 2014 Historic Places Aotearoa placed an information panel on Napier Technical College's first site, on the corner of Munroe and Station Street. The land is mostly now used by Woolworths.

The main block of Napier Intermediate School was built on the foundations of what was the new building of Napier Technical College. MTG Hawke's Bay has a set of the school's uniform: a shirt, cap and pair of shorts. These were taken from student Harry Pond as he was being rescued from the collapsed building after the earthquake.

== Notable staff ==
- Roland Hipkins – artist

== Notable alumni ==
- Snow Bowman – member of the All Blacks
- Gordon Christie – politician of the Labour Party
- Douglas Dalton – member of the All Blacks
- John Swain – member of the All Blacks
- Ray Williams – member of the All Blacks
