= Morrie McHugh =

New Zealand rugby union player

- Born: Maurice James McHugh; 19 February 1917 Auckland, New Zealand
- Died: 25 September 2010 (aged 93) Auckland, New Zealand
- Height: 1.85 m (6 ft 1 in)
- Weight: 95 kg (209 lb)
- School: Sacred Heart College, Auckland

Rugby union career
- Position(s): Loose forward, lock
Provincial / State sides
Years	Team	Apps	(Points)
1936–1949	Auckland		
International career
Years	Team	Apps	(Points)
1946–1949	New Zealand	3	(0)

Maurice James McHugh (19 February 1917 – 25 September 2010) was a New Zealand rugby union player who played for the All Blacks in 1946 and 1949; he was the 458th All Black.

== Early life ==
He was educated at Sacred Heart College, Auckland, and later played for the Auckland Marist club. He was the national amateur heavyweight boxing champion in 1938.

== All Blacks ==
He was a forward for the All Blacks 15 times, including two tests (1946) against Australia and one (1949) against South Africa.

When he died aged 93 in Auckland in 2010, he was the oldest living All Black (a distinction that then went to Fred Allen).

Records
Preceded by Eric Tindill	Oldest living All Black; 1 August – 25 September 2010	Succeeded by Fred Allen
