= Eric Tindill =

New Zealand sportsman (1910–2010)

Eric Tindill OBE
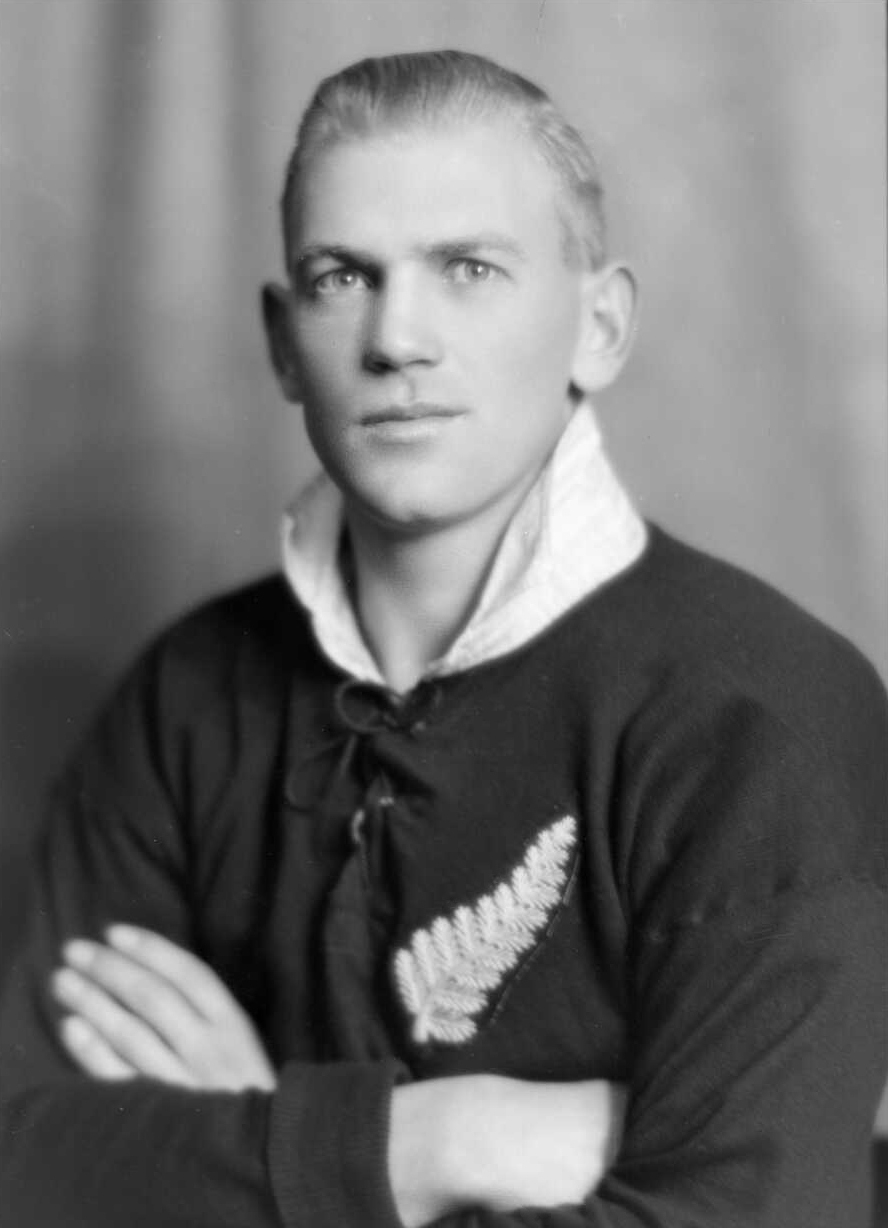
- Tindill in 1935

Personal information
- Full name: Eric William Thomas Tindill
- Born: 18 December 1910; Nelson, New Zealand
- Died: 1 August 2010 (aged 99); Wellington, New Zealand
- Nickname: Snowy
- Batting: Left-handed
- Role: Wicket-keeper; Opening batsman Umpire
- Relatives: Paul Tindill (son)

International information
- National side: New Zealand (1937–1947)
- Test debut (cap 31): 26 June 1937 v England
- Last Test: 25 March 1947 v England

Domestic team information
- Years: Team
- 1932/33–1949/50: Wellington

Umpiring information
- Tests umpired: 1 (1959)

Career statistics
Competition	Test	First-class
Matches	5	69
Runs scored	73	3,127
Batting average	9.12	30.35
100s/50s	0/0	6/12
Top score	37*	149
Catches/stumpings	6/1	96/33
- Source: Cricinfo, 22 January 2017
- Height: 1.73 m (5 ft 8 in)
- Weight: 66 kg (146 lb)

Rugby union career
- Position(s): Halfback, first five-eighth
Provincial / State sides
Years	Team	Apps	(Points)
1932–45	Wellington		
International career
Years	Team	Apps	(Points)
1935–38	New Zealand	1	(0)

Eric William Thomas Tindill OBE (18 December 1910 – 1 August 2010) was a New Zealand sportsman. Tindill held a number of unique records: he was the oldest ever Test cricketer at the time of his death, the only person to play Tests for New Zealand in both cricket and rugby union (a so-called "double All Black"), and the only person ever to play Tests in both sports, referee a rugby union Test, and umpire a cricket Test: a unique "double-double".

== Early life ==
Tindill was born on 18 December 1910 in Nelson, and raised in Motueka. His family moved to Wellington in 1922, and he was educated at Wellington Technical College until 1925. He trained as an accountant, and worked as a civil servant for 40 years in the government audit office. He was nicknamed "Snowy" due to his fair hair. He married his wife Mary in 1937, shortly before he left on a cricket tour to England. An all-round sportsman, in addition to cricket and rugby, Tindill also played football for Wellington in 1927, and was a founder of the Wellington Table Tennis Association in 1932.

== Cricket ==
In cricket, Tindill played club cricket for the Midland club (now Eastern Suburbs Cricket Club). He played domestic first-class cricket for Wellington from 1932–33 to 1949–50 as a wicket-keeper/batsman and left-handed opening batsman. He made a century on his first-class debut in January 1933, scoring 106 as an opening batsman in a Plunket Shield match against Auckland at Eden Park.

He also played five Tests for the New Zealand cricket team. He toured England under Curly Page in 1937, playing in 25 tour matches, including the three Test matches at Lord's, Old Trafford and the Oval. The report of the tour in the 1938 edition of Wisden Cricketers' Almanack stated that Tindill "did nothing out of the common with the bat, but as a wicket-keeper he was always worth his place". Later that year, in a match played against South Australia in Adelaide on the return journey to help cover the costs of the England tour, he caught Don Bradman for 11 – Bradman's only appearance against a New Zealand team – off the bowling of Jack Cowie in the opening over of the Saturday's play. Unfortunately, this caused large numbers of spectators who were queuing to enter the ground to leave, costing the New Zealand team the gate money and defeating the purpose of the game.

He served in the NZEF in the Second World War, in North Africa. He then played in the first two Test matches in New Zealand after the War. In the Test against Australia at Wellington in 1945–46, New Zealand were bowled out for 42 and then 54, Tindill making 1 and 13. He also played in the only Test against the touring English side at Lancaster Park, Christchurch, in 1946–47. His Test batting average of 9.12 did not reflect his talent.

He played his last first-class game for Wellington against the touring Australians in 1950. He scored six first-class centuries and finished with an average of 30.35 in 116 innings in 69 first-class matches. He reached his top score – 149 – playing for Wellington against Auckland in 1948. As a wicket-keeper, he took 96 catches and 33 stumpings.

== Rugby ==
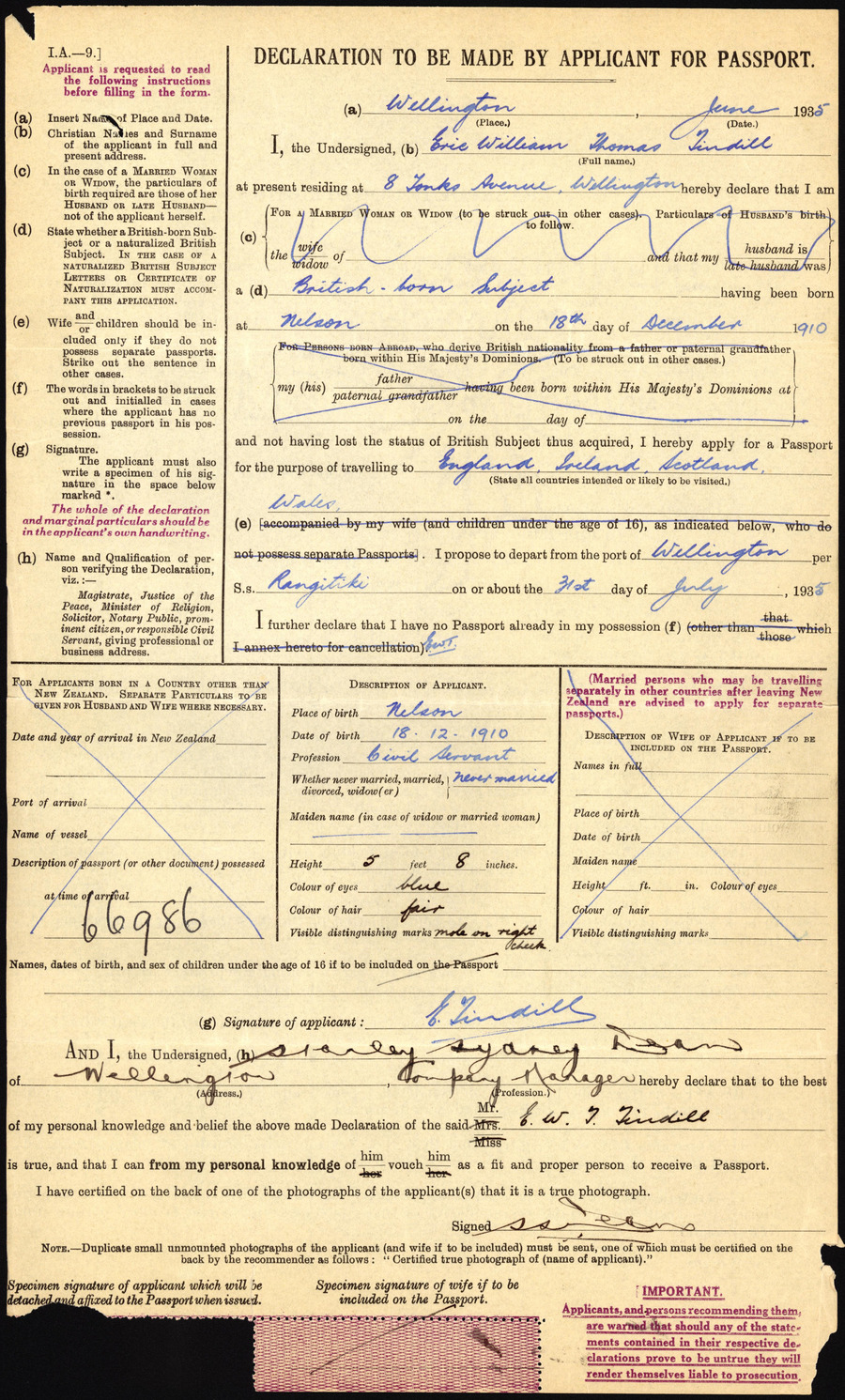
Eric William Thomas Tindill passport application (1935)

In rugby, Tindill alternated between half-back and first five-eighth for Wellington (Athletic) between 1932 and 1945, and was noted for his kicking of drop goals, then worth 4 points against 3 for a try. He made his debut for Wellington playing against the All Blacks in 1932, before they left on tour; he scored a try, and the provincial side beat the national team, 36–23.

The vast supply of midfield talent in Wellington during the 1930s made it difficult for him to get noticed, but the selectors for the All Blacks were remarkably thorough at seeking out talent—the trials for the team that would tour Britain in 1935–36 would see 188 players take part to fill 30 places. He was selected for that tour, and played in New Zealand's first loss to a club side against Swansea, 3–11, but scored two drop goals against London Counties on 26 December 1935, and was selected to play one Test against England at Twickenham on 4 January 1936. The match is most famous for the two tries scored by England's Alexander Obolensky – the son of a Russian émigré prince, playing in his first Test – and England beat New Zealand for the first time, 13–0.

Tindill was unable to play against South Africa in 1937, having already departed to tour England with the New Zealand cricket team, but he joined the All Blacks tour to Australia in 1938, playing in three games against state sides. The match against England in 1936 remained his only rugby Test. In all, he played 17 matches with the All Blacks, including one Test, and scored 24 points for 6 drop goals. Famed rugby commentator Winston McCarthy was certain that Tindill would have won selection for the 1940 tour of South Africa had it not been scrapped due to the outbreak of World War II.

== Umpire and referee ==
After retiring from active sport, Tindill also refereed rugby at domestic and Test level. He was noted for his keen instinct of the game's progress; McCarthy would recall, "In one match in which six tries were scored I saw the six of them scored at Eric's feet as he waited for the player to ground the ball." The pinnacle of his career as a rugby referee came in 1950, when he oversaw the first two Tests of the series between the Lions and All Blacks, in Dunedin and Christchurch. He would later umpire a cricket Test at Lancaster Park in 1959, having refereed the rugby Test there in 1950. He also refereed the rugby match against Australia at Dunedin in 1955.

Tindill was later an umpire, standing in one Test at Lancaster Park in 1959 with Jack Cowie, which England won by an innings and 99 runs inside three days, thanks to Ted Dexter's 141 and Tony Lock's 5–31 and 6–53.

== Later life ==
Tindill was secretary of the Wellington Cricket Association, and a selector for both Wellington and New Zealand cricket teams. He was a member of the panel that selected the New Zealand team that achieved the country's first Test victory, against the West Indies in 1956. He was also Treasurer of the New Zealand Boxing Council from 1973 to 1981. In the 1981 Queen's Birthday Honours, Tindill was appointed an Officer of the Order of the British Empire, for services to rugby and cricket. He was inducted as a member of New Zealand's Sports Hall of Fame in 1995. He received a Halberg award for services to sport in 2000.

He also wrote a best-selling book, The Tour of the Third All Blacks, about the 1935–36 tour, with fellow All Black Charlie Oliver, and wrote a history of Wellington Athletic Rugby Football Club in 1976. Of his five children, his son Paul played for Wellington in both rugby and first-class cricket, and another son Dennis played rugby for Wellington B in 1964.

Tindill died in Wellington on 1 August 2010, at the age of 99, and was buried at Karori Cemetery.

== Records ==
While Tindill is the only person to have played Tests in both cricket and rugby union for New Zealand, six other players have represented New Zealand in both rugby union and cricket – the others being George Dickinson and Curly Page (Tests in cricket only); Brian McKechnie, Charlie Oliver and Jeff Wilson (Tests in rugby only); and Bill Carson (no Test at either sport).

Tindill became the oldest living Test cricketer on 16 February 2004, on the death of Don Cleverley. On 8 November 2009, he surpassed Francis MacKinnon, who played one Test for England in 1879 and lived to 98 years and 324 days, as the oldest Test cricketer in history. His Test longevity record was surpassed on 23 March 2011 by Norman Gordon.

He became the oldest living All Black on 8 October 2001, on the death of Ray Williams, and was the last surviving All Black who played a Test before World War II. The oldest ever Test rugby player remains Scotland's Mac Henderson, who died on 5 March 2009 aged 101 years and 309 days.

After Tindill's death, the oldest living Test cricketer became former South African fast bowler Norman Gordon, and the oldest living All Black was Morrie McHugh.

== Notes and references ==
Records
Preceded by Don Cleverley	Oldest living Test cricketer 16 February 2004 – 1 August 2010	Succeeded by Norman Gordon
Preceded by Ray Williams	Oldest living All Black; 8 October 2001 – 1 August 2010	Succeeded by Morrie McHugh
