= 1931 Hawke's Bay earthquake =

Deadliest earthquake in New Zealand

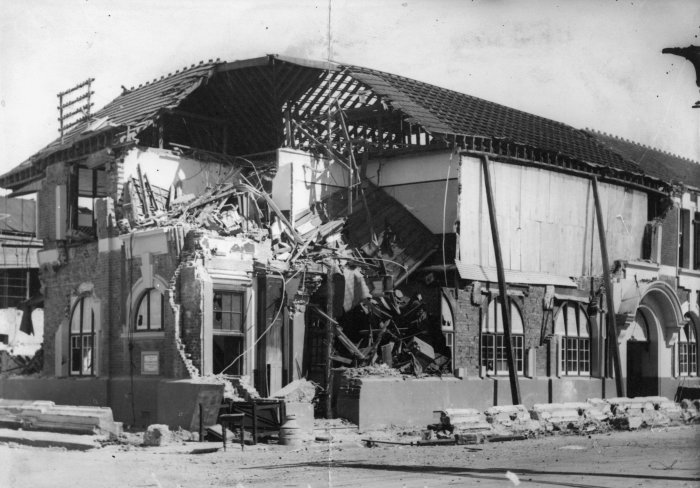
- Hastings Post Office

- Location within New Zealand
- UTC time: 1931-02-02 22:46:52
- ISC event: 906607
- USGS-ANSS: ComCat
- Local date: 3 February 1931
- Local time: 10:46:52 NZDT
- Duration: 2:20 seconds
- Magnitude: 7.8 M_{s} 7.7 M_{w}
- Depth: 14 km (8.7 mi)
- Epicentre: 39.3°S 177.0°E
- Areas affected: Napier, Hastings, Hawkes Bay
- Total damage: around 2000 buildings
- Max. intensity: MMI X (Extreme)
- Casualties: 256 dead, thousands injured

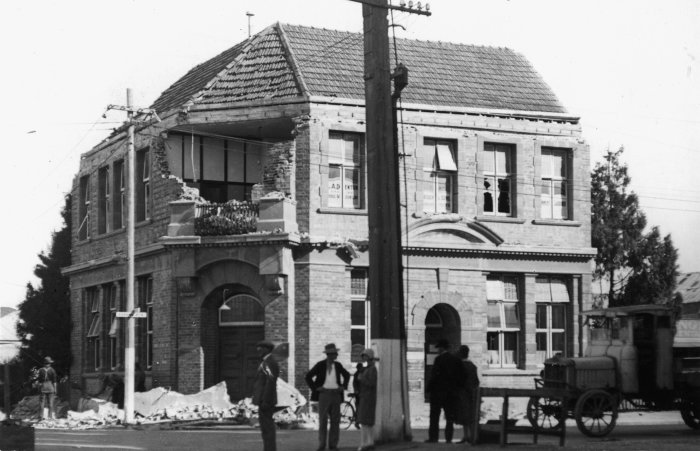
Damage to the Hawkes Bay Tribune building

The 1931 Hawke's Bay earthquake, also known as the Napier earthquake, occurred in New Zealand at 10:47 am on 3 February, killing 256, injuring thousands and devastating the Hawke's Bay region. It remains New Zealand's deadliest natural disaster. Centred 15 km north of Napier, it lasted for two and a half minutes and had a magnitude of 7.8 M_{s} (7.7 M_{w}). There were 525 aftershocks recorded in the following two weeks, with 597 being recorded by the end of February. The main shock could be felt in much of New Zealand, with reliable reports coming in from as far south as Timaru, on the east coast of the South Island.

== Tectonic setting ==
New Zealand lies along the boundary between the Indo-Australian plate and Pacific plates. In the South Island most of the relative displacement between these plates is taken up along a single dextral (right lateral) strike-slip fault with a major reverse component, the Alpine Fault. In the North Island the displacement is mainly taken up along the Hikurangi Subduction Zone, although the remaining dextral strike-slip component of the relative plate motion is accommodated by the North Island Fault System (NIFS).

The earthquake is thought to have occurred on one of the larger thrust faults within the accretionary wedge, at between ca. 5 km depth and ca. 20–25 km depth (which is the approximate depth of subducted Pacific plate at that location).

== Damage and effects ==
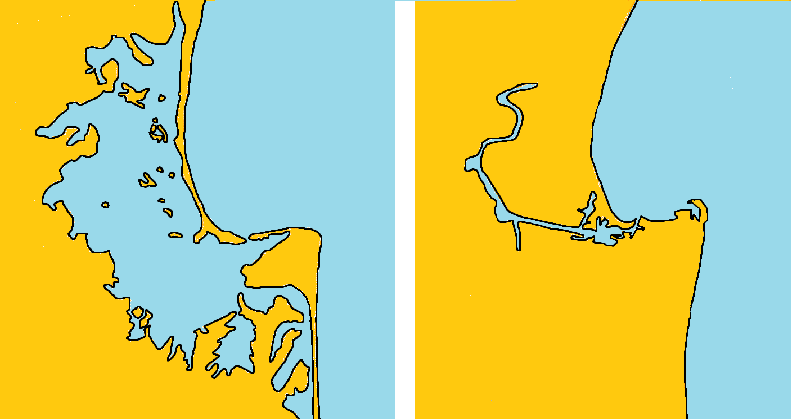
Comparison map of the extent of Ahuriri Lagoon before (left) and after (right) the earthquake

Nearly all buildings in the central areas of Napier and Hastings were levelled (The Dominion noted that "Napier as a town has been wiped off the map"). It was, at the time, New Zealand's most damaging earthquake to buildings since European settlement began around 1840. The material damage of the earthquake was estimated at $1.01 billion.

The local landscape changed dramatically, with the coastal areas around Napier being lifted by around two metres. The most noticeable land change was the uplifting of some 40 km^{2} of sea-bed to become dry land. This included Ahuriri Lagoon, which was lifted more than 2.7 metres and resulted in draining 3,600 hectares (9,000 acres) of the lagoon. Today, this area is the location of Hawke's Bay Airport, housing and industrial developments and farmland.

=== Fires ===
Within minutes fires broke out in a few chemist shops in Hastings Street, Napier. The fire brigade almost had the first fire under control when the second broke out in a shop at the back of the Masonic Hotel. The fire continued to spread through adjoined wooden buildings, which led to the entire town being engulfed in flames by the afternoon. The wind at this point also picked up strength and began blowing from the east, pushing the fires back over the city. The day was hot and dry which increased the fire's ability to spread. With water mains broken, the brigade was unable to save many buildings. Attempts were made at pumping water from the sea, but these failed. Fire engines at Napier's central fire station were covered in debris from the earthquake which made them unavailable for use. Pumping water from Clive Square, they were able to stop the fires spreading south. Only a few buildings in the central Napier area survived. Some withstood the earthquake only to be gutted by fire. Trapped people had to be left to burn as people were unable to free them in time. It took until the following afternoon for the main fires to go out, but the ruins still smouldered for several days. In Hastings, the fires were quickly brought under control.

=== Utilities ===
The entire east coast of the North Island lost electricity during the quake, although power was restored to Masterton, Pahiatua, Dannevirke and Waipukurau within two hours, and to Gisborne within ten hours. At Napier substation, the transformers were tipped over by the force of the quake and the high-voltage switchgear damaged, while the Napier to Tuai transmission line was taken out of service after a landslide caused a tower to collapse. A limited supply was restored to Napier and Hastings on 4 February; due to the damage at Napier substation, the Waipukurau to Napier transmission line was jumpered to the low-voltage switchgear at both ends. The Napier to Tuai line was repaired and put back into service on 12 February, while full supply to Napier substation was restored on 29 March.

There was also severe damage to sewerage systems, gas supply and telegraph systems.

=== Transport ===
The earthquake caused great damage to Napier's roads, railways, bridges and wharves. Rails were badly twisted. The city's tram tracks were also twisted, and were never restored.

New Zealand's first commercial air disaster occurred six days after the quake, when a Dominion Airlines Desoutter monoplane crashed near Wairoa. The small airline had been making three return trips a day between Hastings and Gisborne, carrying passengers and supplies. All three on board were killed.

=== Miscellaneous ===
Four prisoners working at Bluff Hill in Napier were buried in a landslip caused by the quake. The remaining prisoners dug them out, but two had been killed. The prisoners re-assembled without any attempt to escape and were locked up in the Napier Jail. In Taradale, Mission Estate missionaries' accommodation block had been built and opened on 2 February. The next day the earthquake struck, causing serious damage to the entire Mission. Two priests and seven students were killed when the stone chapel was destroyed. In Havelock North, St. Luke's church was damaged (but not destroyed) just before a wedding was due to take place. The couple got married later in the day, but outdoors.

About 10% of homes on soft ground in Napier experienced ground damage, such as liquefaction. There was a large amount of damage to buildings, mainly ones made of brick; the earthquake occurred before an earthquake building code was introduced. The Napier Daily Telegraph newspaper office was destroyed, and so was the Hawke's Bay Herald's printing facility in Hastings. Napier Technical College was destroyed, which caused it to be disestablished and amalgamated into Napier Girls' High School and Napier Boys' High School.

== Casualties ==
The official death toll was 256, although the Napier earthquake memorial lists 258 names. Of these, 161 people were in Napier, 93 in Hastings, and two in Wairoa. Thousands more were injured, with over 400 being hospitalised. There were several places that had multiple deaths, including 17 deaths due to Roach's department store collapsing, 15 in an old men's home, 9 students in Napier Technical College, 8 from Grand Hotel, and 7 at the Greenmeadows seminary.

== Response ==
Shortly after the earthquake, people escaped to the Marine Parade Beach. After noticing that the shoreline had receded, they ran away in panic under the expectation that a tsunami was on its way. There was, however, no tidal wave; the receded shoreline was caused by the land moving upwards.

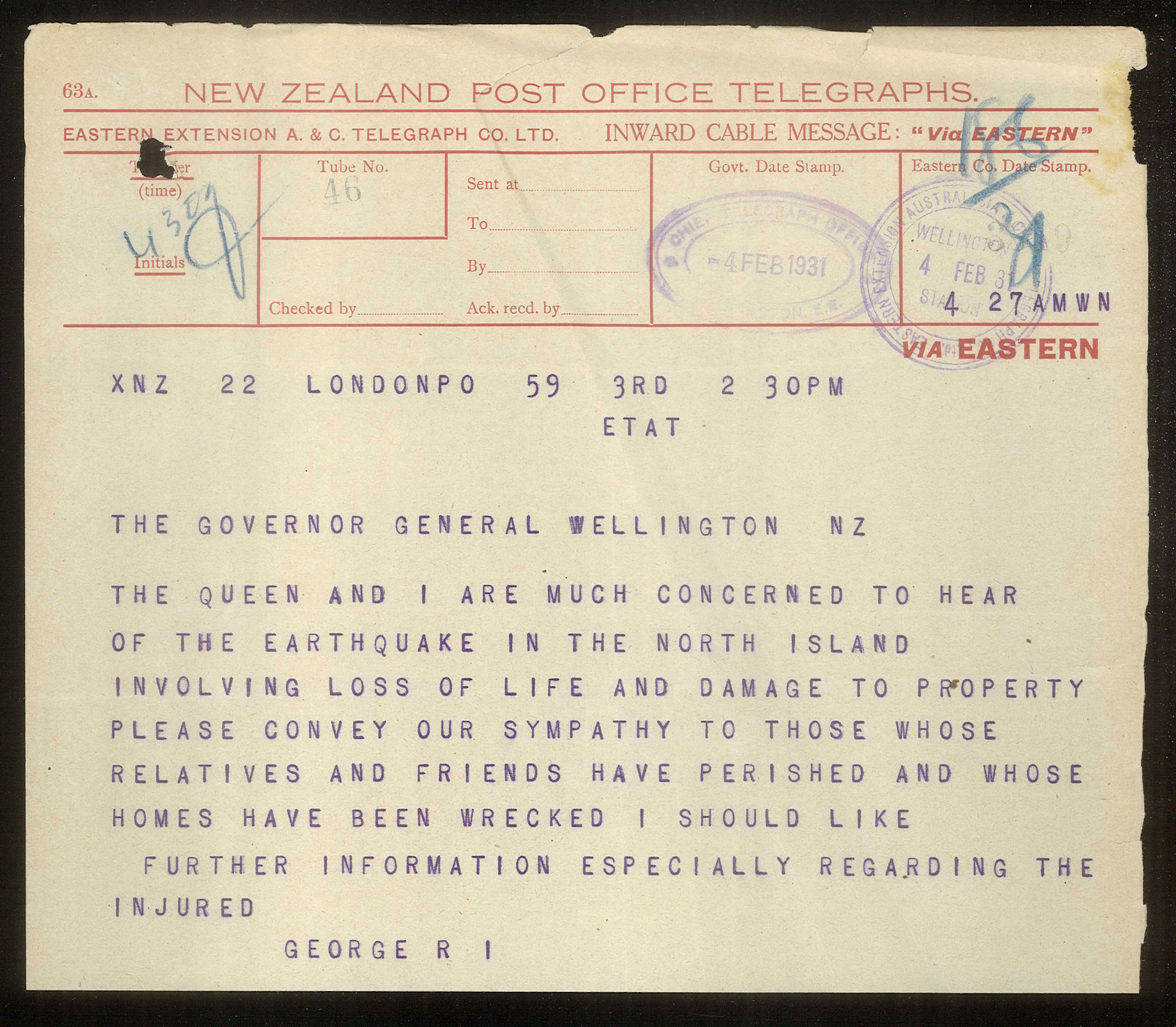
Telegram from King George V to Governor-General of New Zealand, 3 February 1931

On 4 February over 5,000 people evacuated Napier, mainly women and children. Men were expected to stay to help out with the recovery. The army and navy also arrived in Napier to help with the recovery. Nelson Park served as Napier's "evacuation centre" which was the site of many tents and was able to cater for over 1,000 people from a field kitchen. Many people also lived in tents in Marine Parade and other places. There were several places that gave out free food in Napier and Hawke's Bay, such as in several schools. Water barrels were also kept full to allow for people to take from them, after losing water access from their homes.

Within four days of the quake, cinemas around New Zealand offered news specials about the disaster.

=== HMS Veronica ===
The death toll might have been much higher had the Royal Navy ship HMS Veronica not been in port at the time. Within minutes of the shock the Veronica had sent radio messages asking for help. The sailors joined survivors to fight the fires, rescue trapped people, and provide medical treatment. The Veronica's radio was used to transmit news of the disaster to the outside world and to seek assistance. The crew from two cargo ships, the Northumberland and Taranaki, also joined the rescue works, while two cruisers, HMS Diomede and HMS Dunedin, were dispatched from Auckland that afternoon with food, tents, medicine, blankets, and a team of doctors and nurses. The cruisers sailed at high speed overnight, arrived on 4 February, and provided valuable assistance in all areas until their departure on 11 February.

== Aftershocks ==
On 13 February, Hawke's Bay was struck by a 7.3 M_{s} aftershock. At the time, this was New Zealand's fourth strongest recorded earthquake. Author Matthew Wright reported that "the power failed three seconds before the earthquake was felt in Napier. People from Napier to Dannevirke ran for their lives as previously damaged buildings cracked and fell". He added "Some inland parts of Hawke's Bay felt this aftershock more strongly than 3 February quake ... but 'there was no damage of any moment'. People rushed into the streets in Dannevirke and Masterton. In Wellington all but one of the clocks stopped working in the Dominion Observatory, and ceiling lights in the Evening Post offices swayed more vigorously than they had the week before". The earthquake of 13 February 1931 is widely regarded as an aftershock of the larger event ten days earlier. But Messrs Adams, Barnett and Hayes commenting on the rapid decline in the frequency of aftershocks in the Journal of Science & Technology stated, "The fresh outbreak on the 13th February, due to the severe shock on that date, may almost be regarded as a separate disturbance, although it probably arose from conditions produced by the original shock on the 3rd".

Aftershocks continued to shake Hawke's Bay frequently until July 1931, where the average aftershock occurrence dropped to less than one daily. Aftershocks continued for a few more years, with the last major jolt shaking the Bay in April 1934.

Below is a list of all recorded aftershocks following the main event.

Year	Month	Date	Number of aftershocks	Largest shock
1931	February		597	
		3 February	151	5.5 M_{s}
		4 February	55	
		5 February	50	
		6 February	29	
		7 February	24	
		8 February	<20	6.4 M_{s}
		9 February	<20	
		10 February	<20	
		11 February	<20	
		12 February	<20	
		13 February	81	7.3 M_{s}
		14 February	23	
		15 February	18	
		16 February	19	
1931	March		75	
1931	April		52	5.5 M_{s}
1931	May		40	6.0 M_{s}
1931	June		40	
1931	July		26	
1931	August		17	
1931	September		20	
1931	October		16	
1931	November		19	
1931	December		14	
1932	May			5.9 M_{s}
1932	September			6.9 M_{s}
1934	March			6.3 M_{s}
1934	April			5.6 M_{s}

In all, 597 earthquakes were recorded at Hastings in February 1931, and more than 900 by the end of December 1931.

== Recovery ==
The government quickly realised that the Napier borough council would be overwhelmed with organising the rebuild and appointed two commissioners for this task, John Barton and Lachlan Bain Campbell. When the commissioners were due to leave in May 1933, they were petitioned to stay, and Barton was invited to stand for the mayoralty, which he declined.

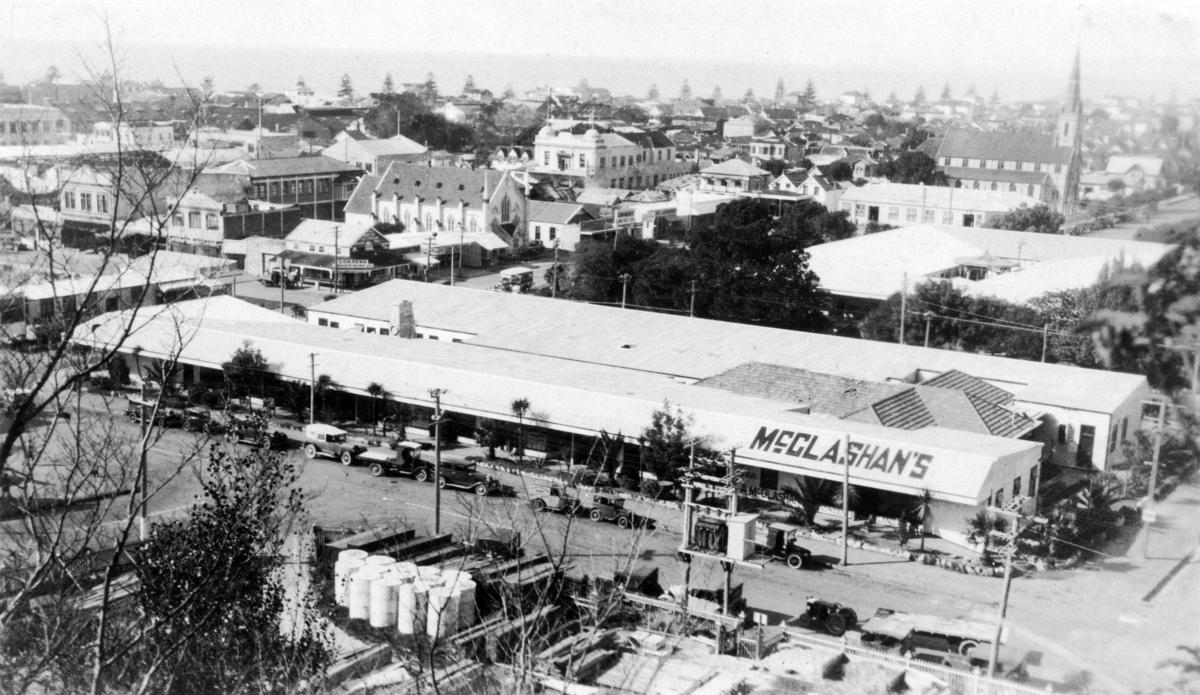
The temporary shopping centre known as "Tin Town"

Several temporary structures were built following the earthquake, including the shopping centre commonly referred to as Tin Town in Clive Square. It remained for about two years, housed over 50 businesses, and was created with a £10,000 loan which did not have to be paid back. According to The Press, it was the world's first "pop-up mall".

The earthquake prompted a thorough review of New Zealand building codes, which were found to be totally inadequate. The first earthquake building code was created in 1935. Many buildings built during the 1930s and 1940s are heavily reinforced, although more recent research has developed other strengthening techniques. Building regulations established as a result of this event mean that to this day, there are only four buildings in Hawke's Bay taller than five storeys, and as most of the region's rebuilding took place in the 1930s when Art Deco was fashionable and at its peak resulting in a major cultural change of the city, Hawke's Bay architecture is regarded today as being one of the finest collections of Art Deco in the world.

At the time of the earthquake, there were no national emergency response organisations or legal provisions in case of such disaster, which was a hindrance to recovery. As a result, new legislation had to be passed quickly, such as the Hawke's Bay Earthquake Act 1931 which received assent on 28 April to give out loans for the rebuild. The Great Depression caused difficulty gathering funds however, so a large portion came from charity.

On the tenth anniversary of the earthquake, the New Zealand Listener reported that Napier had risen from the ashes like a phoenix. It quoted the 1931 principal of Napier Girls' High School as saying "Napier today is a far lovelier city than it was before".

The New Napier Carnival was held in January 1933 to celebrate the rebuild of the town, which officially declared it reborn.

== Memorials ==
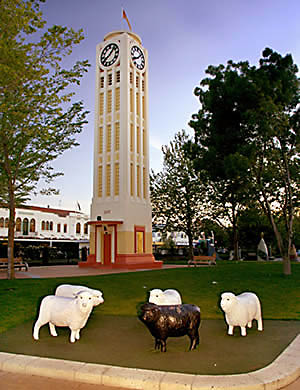
The Hastings Clock Tower was built in 1935 to symbolise the recovery of the earthquake.

A common grave was created on 5 February 1931 to bury 101 of the earthquake's victims. Architect J. A. Louis Hay started designing a memorial for the site in 1932, which consists of an obelisk, a garden, the text "Their sun is gone down while it is yet day" and a written list of the victims known to be buried there. A clock tower memorial was built in Hastings in 1935, which serves the purpose of symbolising recovery rather than being a memorial.

Hastings holds a commemoration every year on 3 February for the earthquake, which starts at 10.30 am and has clock towers ring at 10.47, which was the same time the earthquake struck.

The HMS Veronica Sunbay memorial is located on Marine Parade, which remembers the crew of the ship Veronica. It was built in 1934 and named in 1937 after the ship was decommissioned. The ship's bell is used for community services. The council decided in 2024 that the memorial will be restored again after it was deemed potentially unsafe.

== Gallery ==
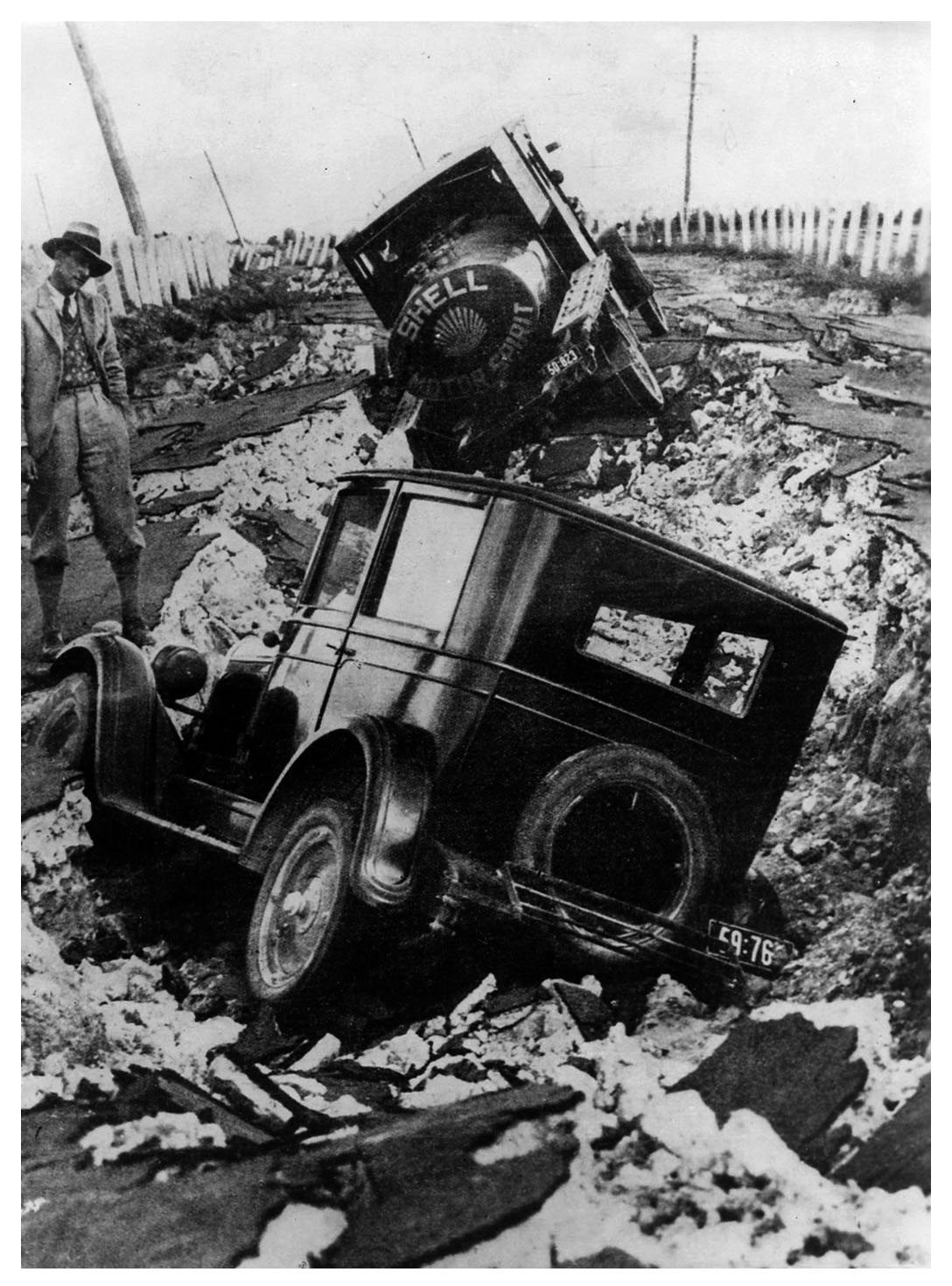
Road damage

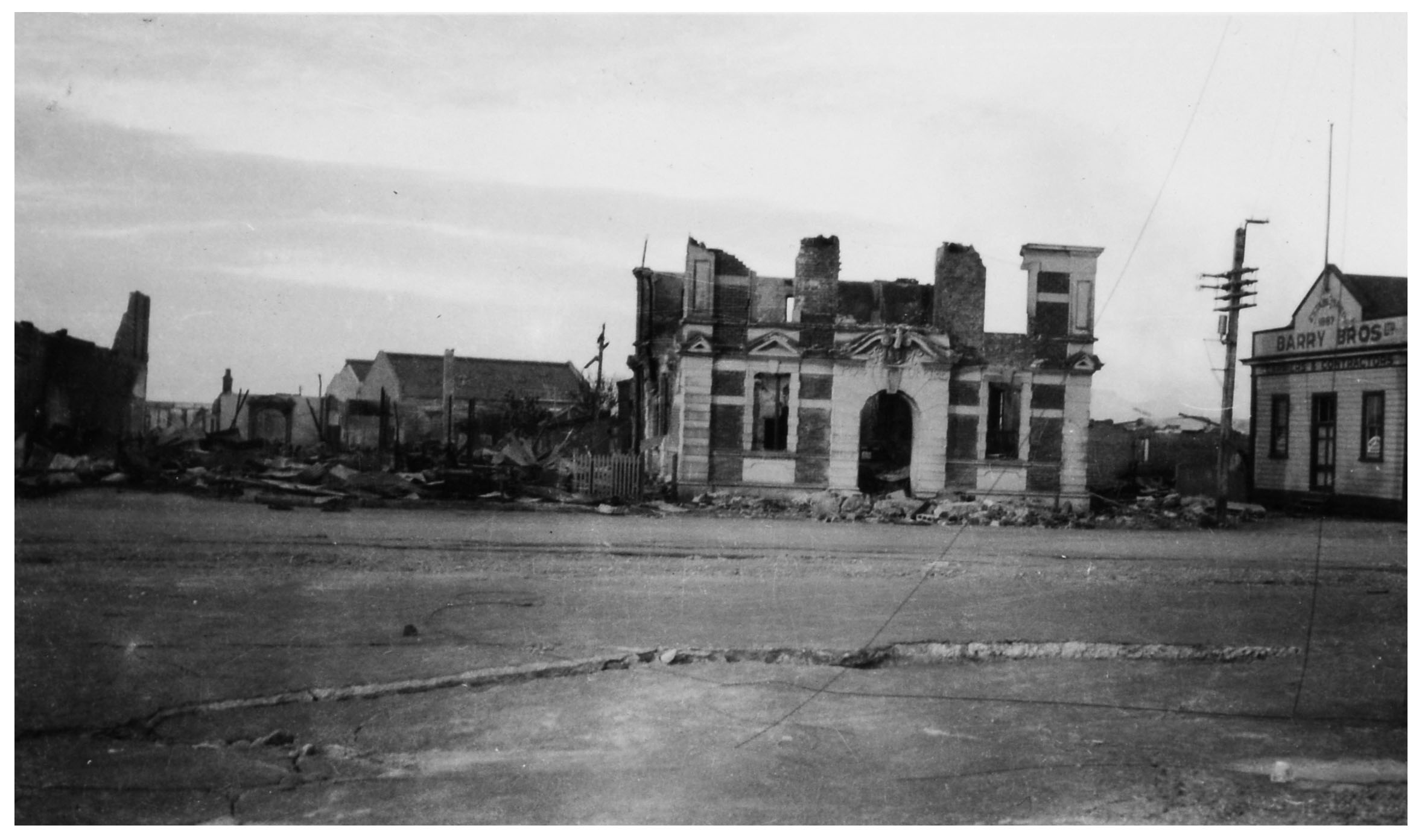
Port Ahuriri

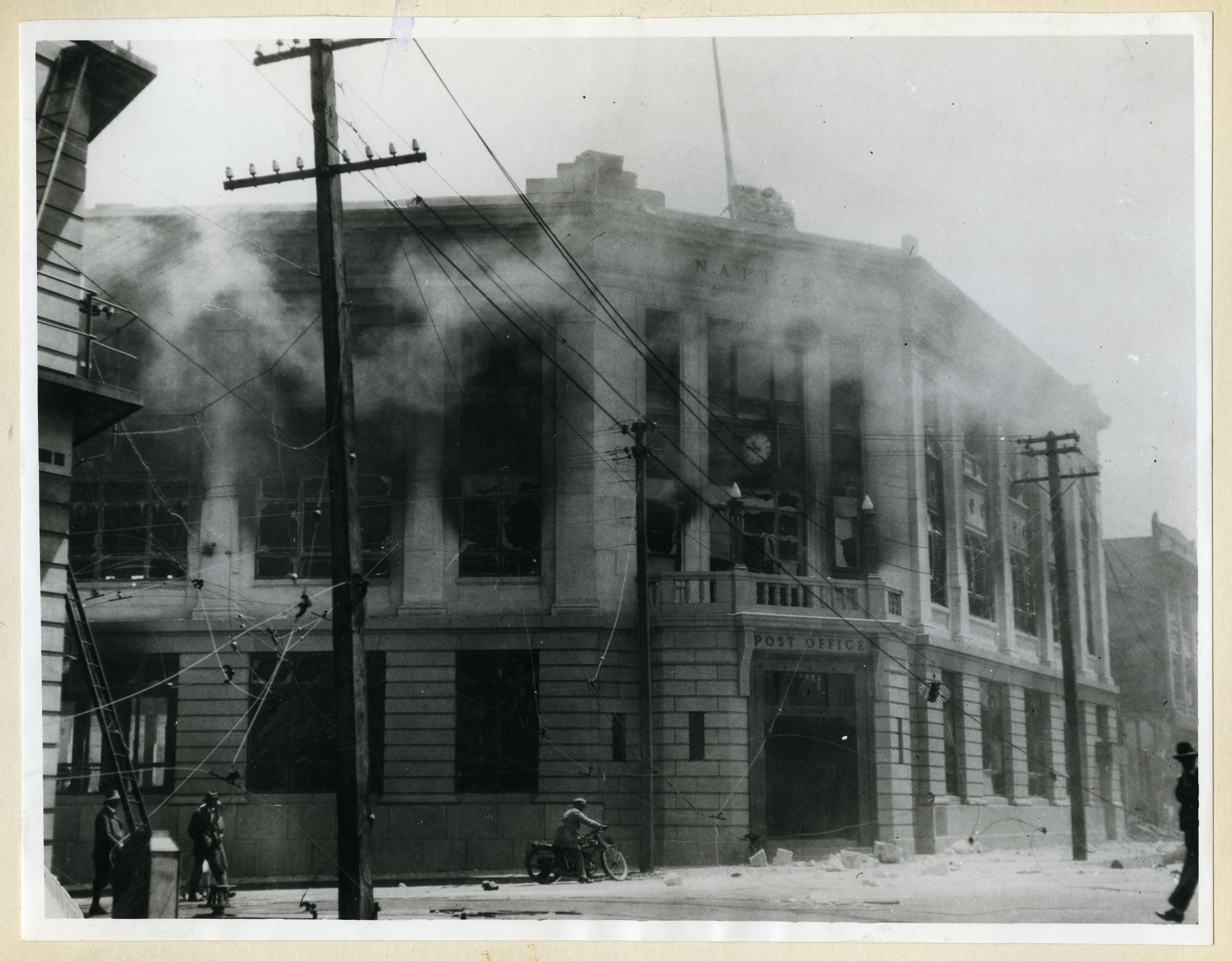
Napier Post Office

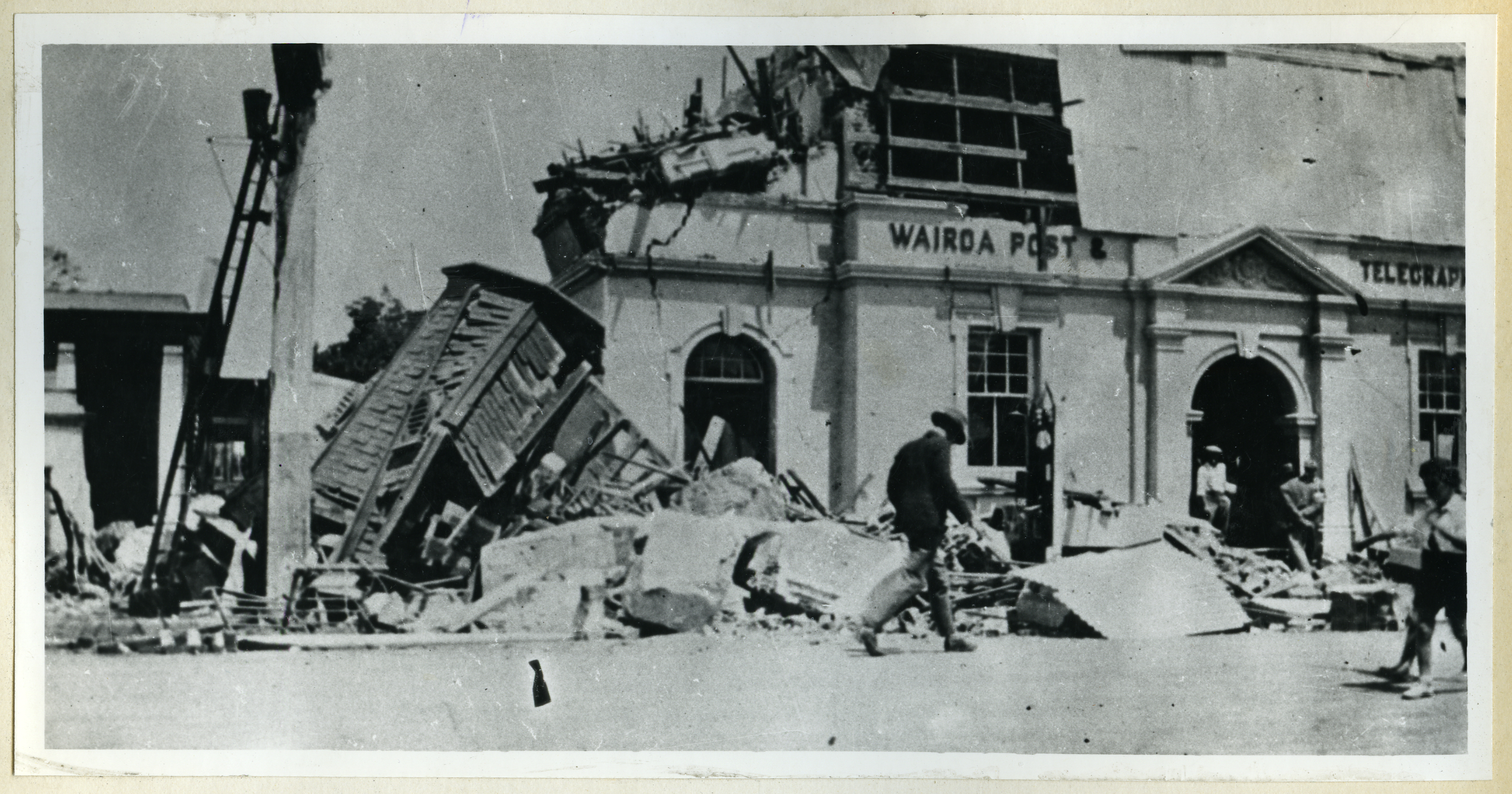
Wairoa Post Office

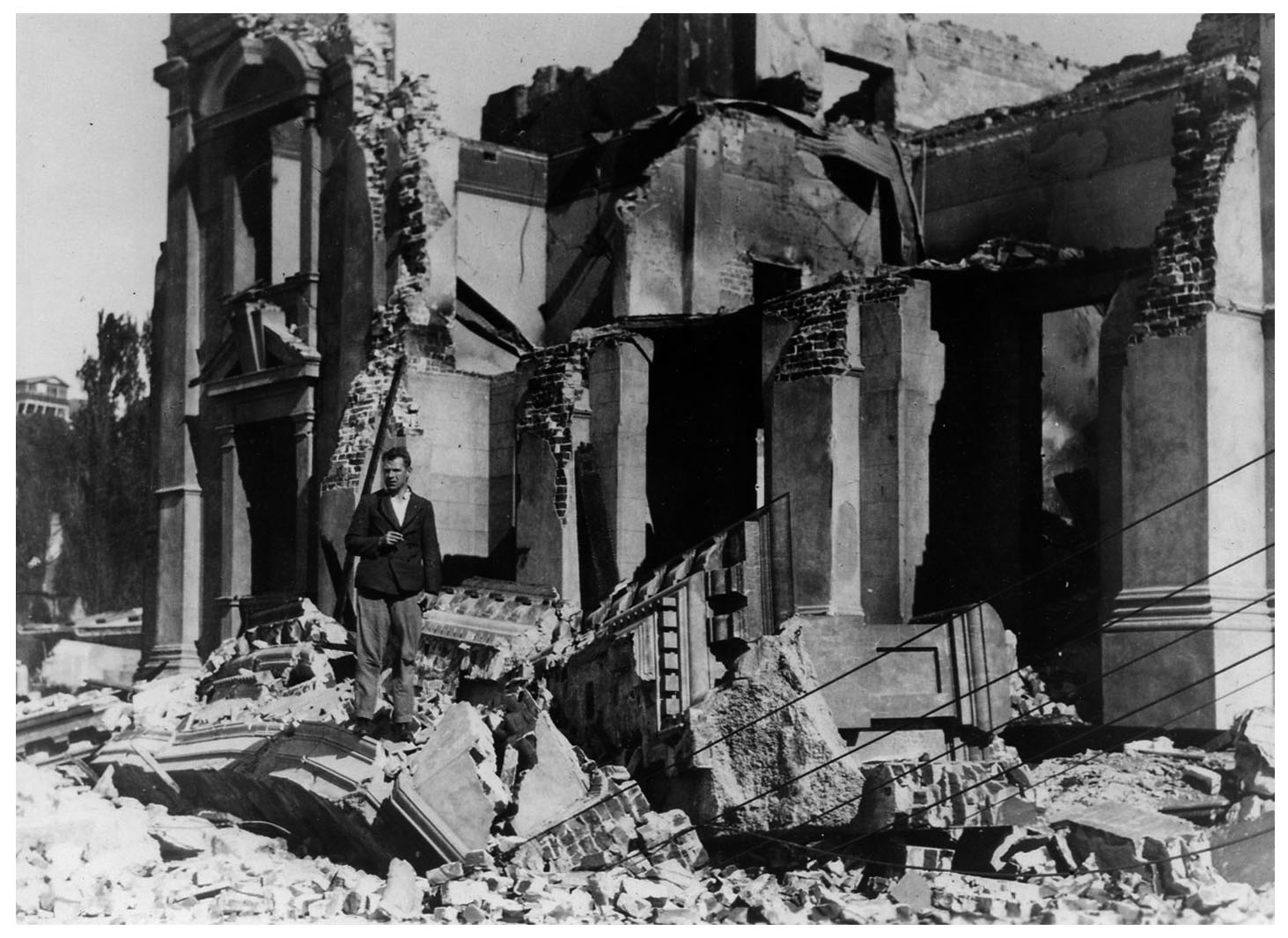
Collapsed building (unidentified)

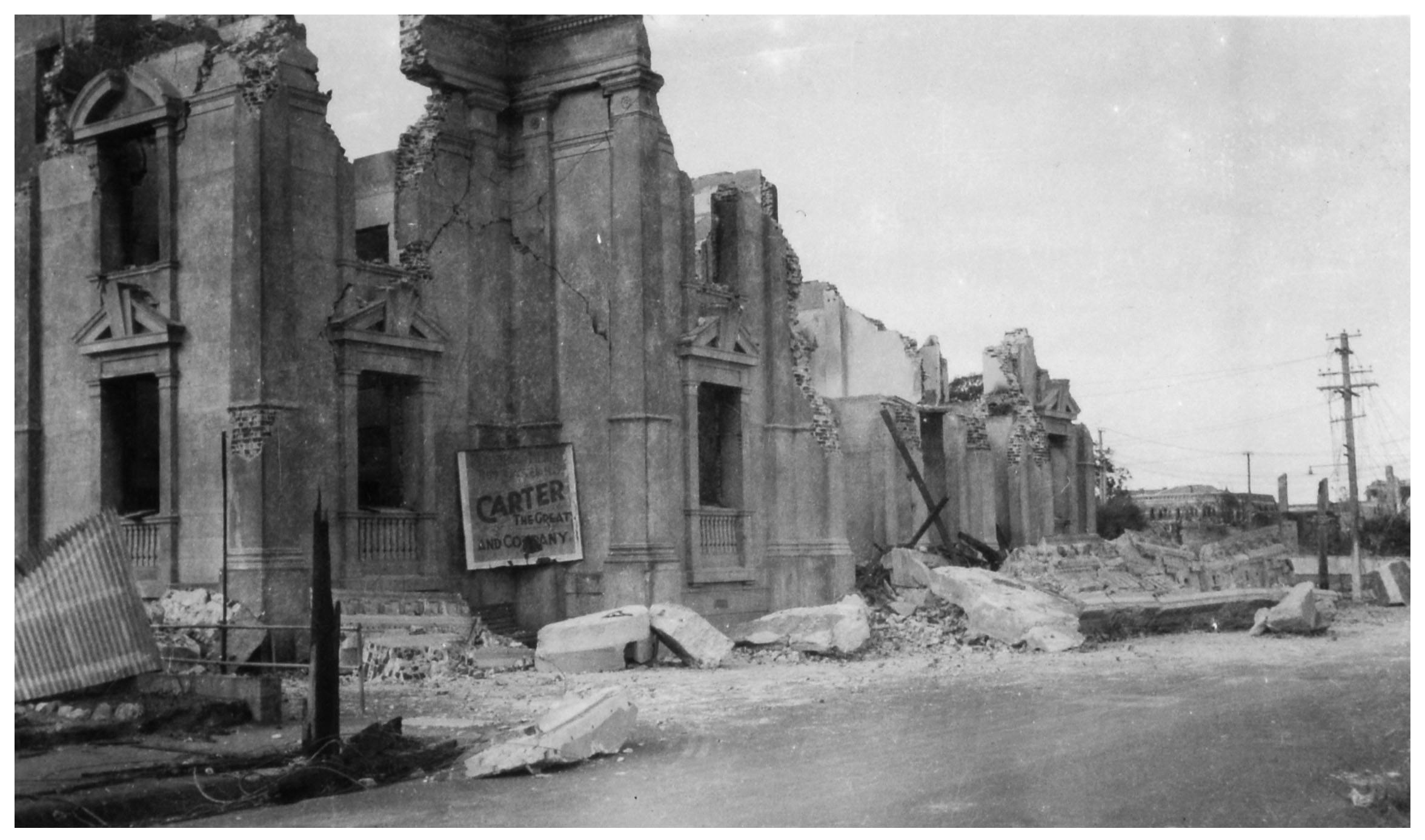
Town Hall

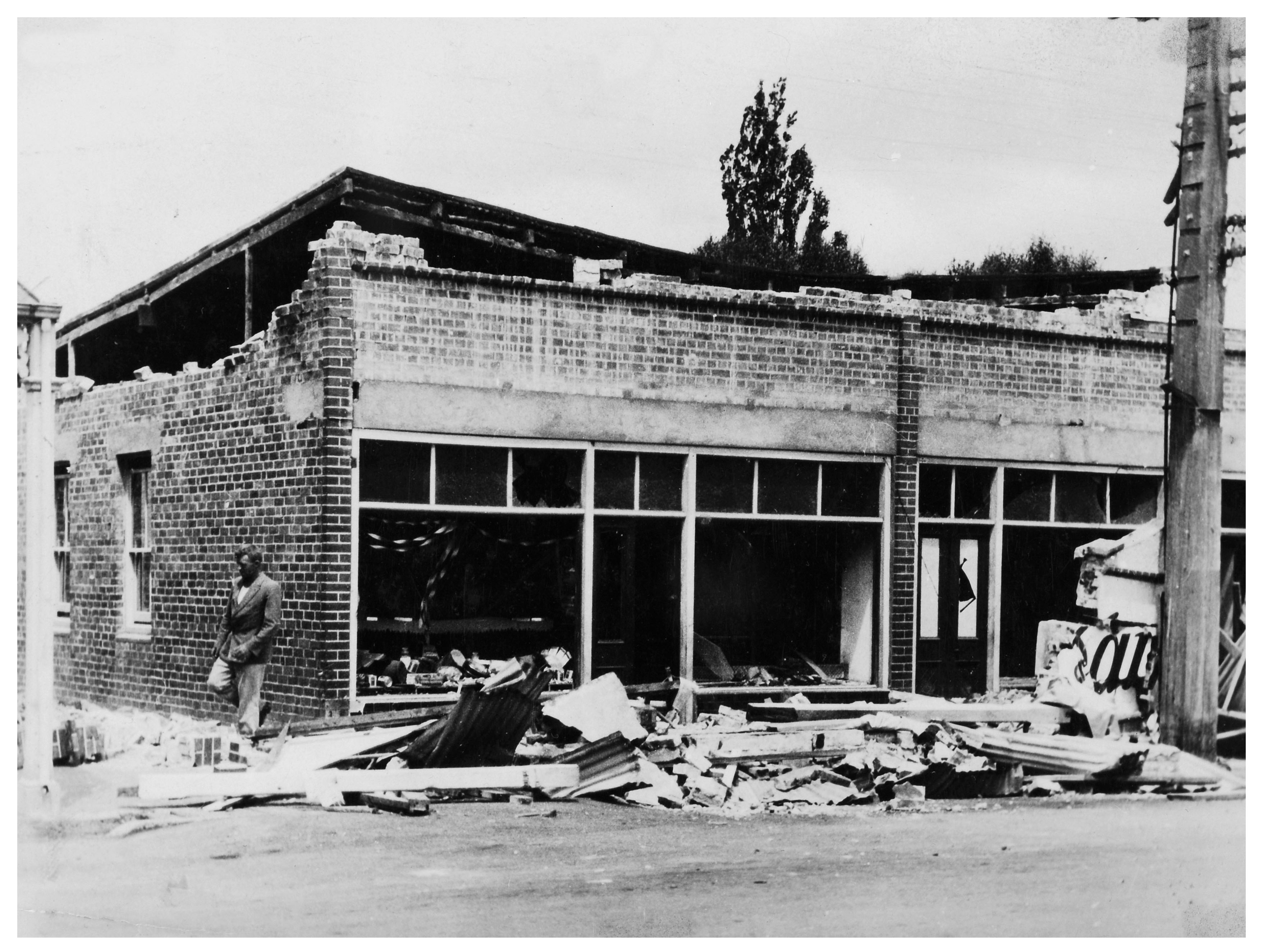
Baker and Pastrycook shop, Waipawa

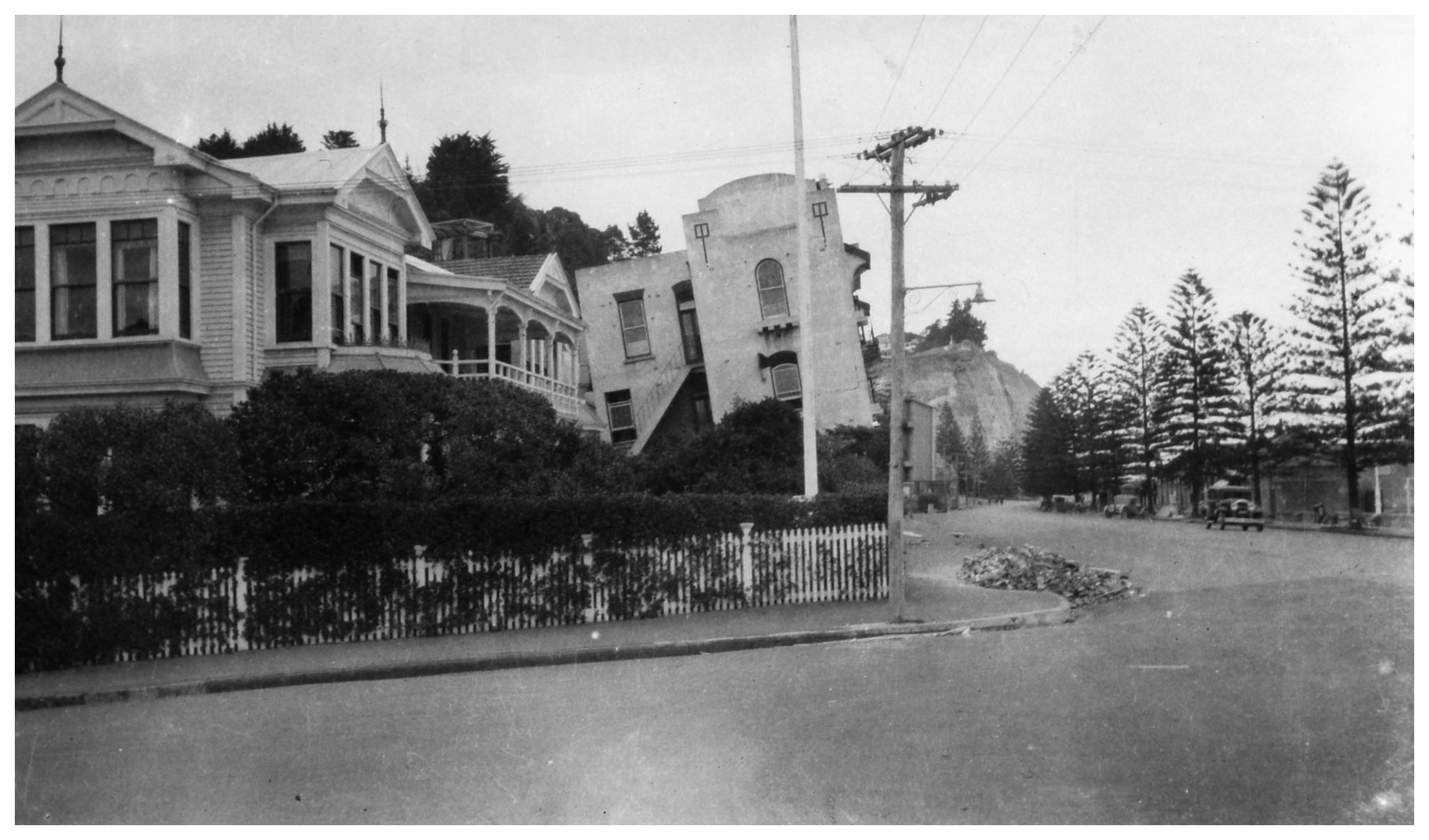
Dr Moore's Private Hospital

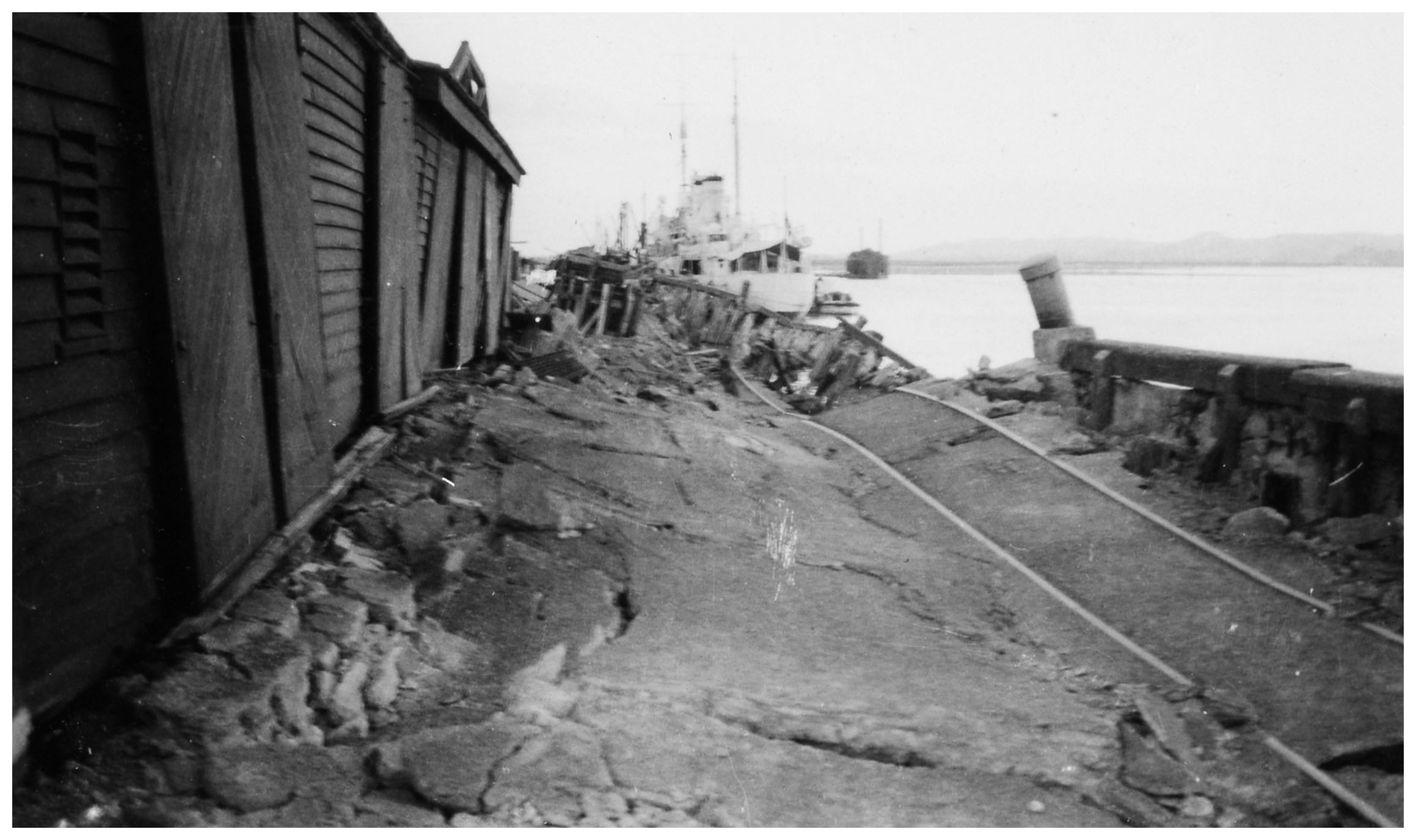
Port Ahuriri - HMS Veronica at Wharf

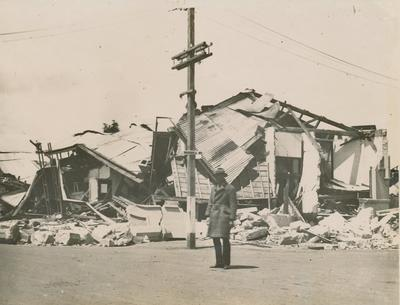
New Zealand Loan & Mercantile Agency Co Ltd office

== See also ==
- 2011 Christchurch earthquake
- List of earthquakes in 1931
- List of earthquakes in New Zealand
- List of disasters in New Zealand by death toll
