= Paul Tindill =

New Zealand cricketer (born 1939)

Paul Tindill (born 6 November 1939 in Wellington) is a New Zealand former cricketer who played one first-class match for Wellington. He was the son of Eric Tindill.
