= Bay View railway station =

Railway station in New Zealand

Bay View and Riverslea railway stations
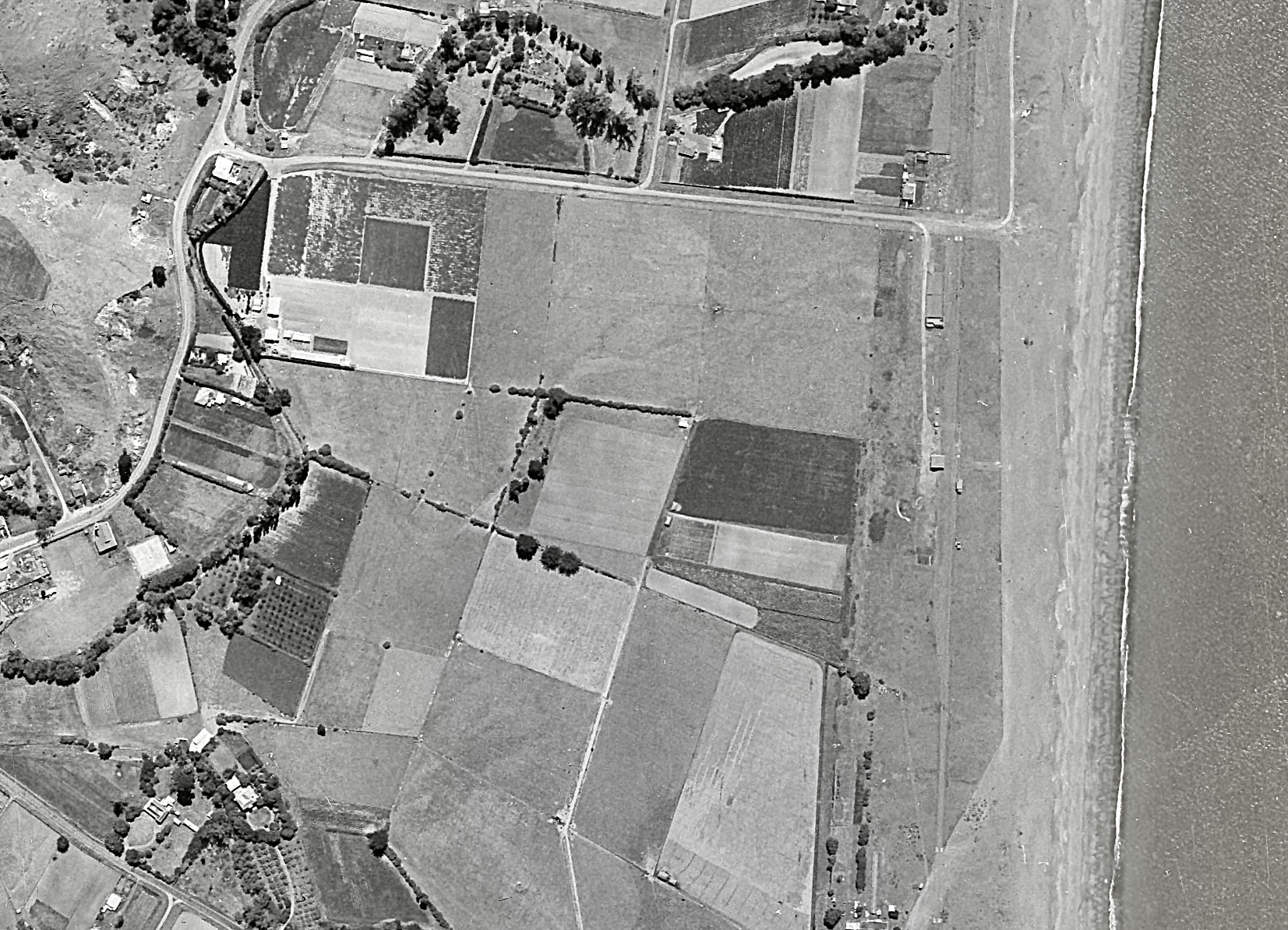
- Bay View railway station in 1943

General information
- Coordinates: 39.4182°S 176.8762°E
- Elevation: 4 m (13 ft)
- Owner: KiwiRail
- Distance: Palmerston North 189.76 km (117.91 mi)

History
- Opened: Bay View 20 July 1923; Riverslea 17 October 1925
- Closed: Bay View 19 June 1983; Riverslea 3 February 1931
- Former names: Petane until 15 October 1923; Kai Orero until 7 January 1924

Services
Preceding station	Historical railways	Following station
Westshore; Line open, station closed 5.96 km (3.70 mi) towards PN	Bay View	Riverslea; Line open, station closed 3.5 km (2.2 mi) towards Gisborne
Bay View; Line open, station closed 3.5 km (2.2 mi) towards PN	Riverslea	Eskdale; Line open, station closed 4.09 km (2.54 mi) towards Gisborne
Location

Bay View was a flag station, which served the settlement of Bay View, New Zealand, on the Napier-Gisborne section of the Palmerston North-Gisborne line, from 1923 to 1983. There was also another flag station to the north, at Riverslea, from 1925 until the 1931 earthquake.

After 1983 the line continued to be used by freight trains and excursions, but beyond Wairoa, the section to Gisborne was closed by slips in 2012 and mothballed. The Napier-Wairoa section reopened in 2019 following a $6.2 million investment from the Provincial Growth Fund, though log trains were soon suspended, due to COVID-19, until November 2020. The line was again closed when Cyclone Gabrielle damaged more than 400 sites in February 2023. A decision has not yet (2025) been made on whether to restore or mothball it. The line north of the 191 km post is designated a construction site, requiring permission for access. Kiwirail is protecting the line so that it can be reopened.

== Bay View railway station ==
Bay View station had a shelter shed, platform, 30 feet (9.1 m) x 20 feet (6.1 m) goods shed, loading bank, cattle and sheep yards and a passing loop for 41 wagons. Railway houses were built in 1932 and 1933. In 1936 one was renovated and painted, electric light installed and one was moved from Bay View to Eskdale. In 1967 a temporary siding stored workshop wagons.

=== History ===
==== 1922-1931 ====
By August 1922 the rails were within a mile of the station and reached it in October 1922. It was then named Pētane, which was changed to Kai Arero on 15 October 1923 and then Bay View from 7 January 1924. Pētane was a transliteration of a missionary name of Bethany and Kai Arero referred to eating a tongue. The first Napier-Eskdale train ran on 20 July 1923. A Sunday train was added in 1925, but replaced by a railway bus from February 1930, as it was thought cheaper than running trains. In 1924 almost a mile of line between Westshore and Bay View was undermined by the sea. Electric lighting came in 1929.

==== 1931-1983 ====
In the 3 February 1931 earthquake, the maximum uplift of 6 feet (1.8 m) was at Bay View. The line subsided between Napier and Bay View due to the earthquake. Repairs started in March and by June 1931 gangs were working on the line from Napier to Bay View, at Eskdale and at Waikoau, but were stopped in October 1931, a decision confirmed by an unfavourable Railways Board report. In December 1935 the Minister of Public Works, Bob Semple, announced that the new Labour government would complete the line. Work began on 27 April and on 2 July 1936 the Napier–Eskdale Section reopened for goods traffic, worked by PWD. The line was taken over by NZR on Monday 23 August 1937, when passenger services resumed. The first railcar ran from Napier to Wairoa and back on 30 June 1937, but a regular service didn't start until 3 July 1939. The station closed to small goods on 27 February 1966, to passengers on 1 July 1976 and closed completely on 19 June 1983.

==== Ballast pit ====
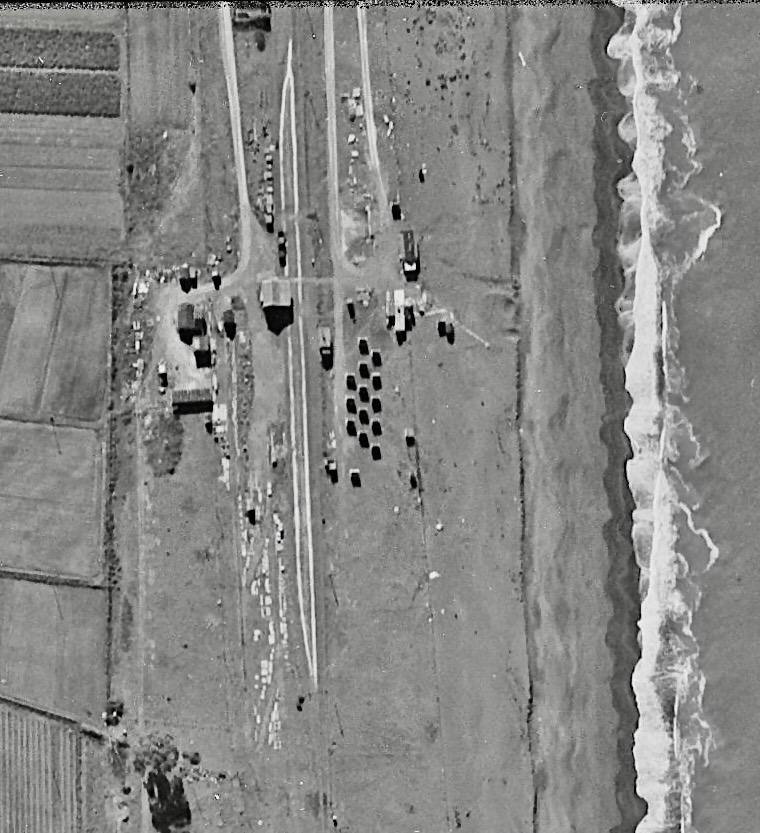
Bay View ballast pit in 1948

A ballast pit was 57 chains (1.1 km) south of the station. It supplied beach shingle to repair the Esk Valley section of line in 1924, to improve Hastings yard in 1936 and to form part of Kotemaori yard in 1937. In 1937, its gravel was used for about 7 miles (11 km) of ballast at Putorino.

== Riverslea railway station ==
Riverslea railway station was open from 17 October 1925 to 3 February 1931, when it closed due to earthquake damage. On 11 January 1927 approval was given for a platform and cart dock for £50 and it still had a shelter shed and platform in 1937, when NZR took over the reopened line, though it was noted that passenger traffic was not permitted. . The building was swept away in the April 1938 flood and a 1939 note recorded "now closed for traffic".
