= Rissington =

Rissington is part of the name of four villages in Gloucestershire, England:

- Great Rissington
- Little Rissington
- Upper Rissington
- Wyck Rissington

In addition:

- Rissington, Hawke's Bay in New Zealand
