= Napier High School =

Napier High School may refer to:

- Napier Boys' High School
- Napier Girls' High School
