= Waikari River =

Waikari River may refer to:

- Waikari River (Canterbury)
- Waikari River (Hawke's Bay)

== See also ==
- Waikare River (disambiguation)
