= Mangaone River (Hawke's Bay) =

River in the Hawke's Bay Region, New Zealand

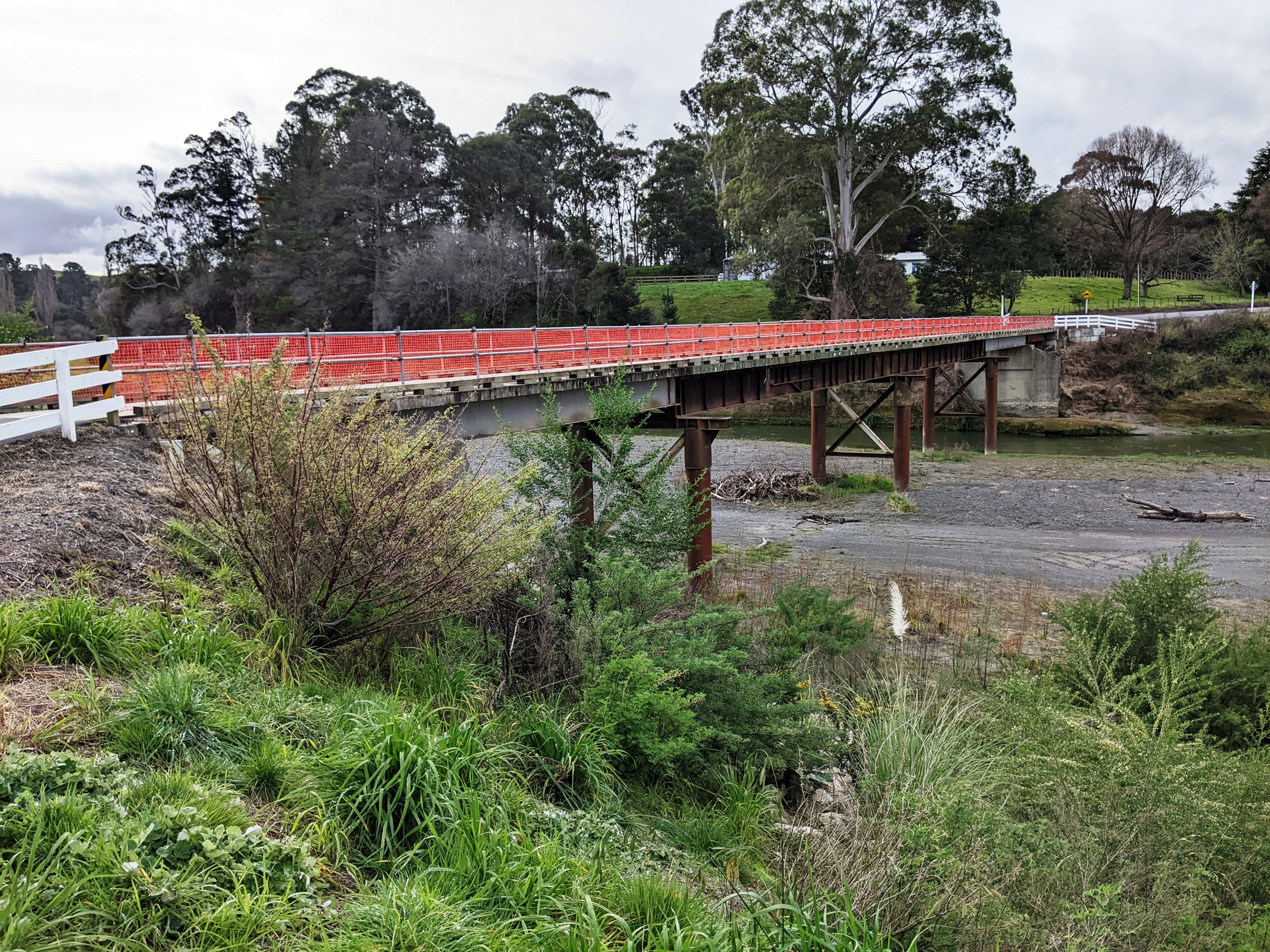
- Dartmoor Bridge
- Route of the Mangaone River
- Mouth of the Mangaone River Mangaone River (Hawke's Bay) (North Island)
- Etymology: Māori meaning "sandy stream"
- Native name: Mangaone

Location
- Country: New Zealand
- Island: North Island
- Region: Hawke's Bay
- District: Hastings

Physical characteristics
- Source: Confluence of Waipuna Stream and Kings Stream
  - location: Te Pōhue
  - coordinates: 39.28771°S 176.65409°E
- Mouth: Tūtaekurī River
  - location: Dartmoor
  - coordinates: 39°28′55″S 176°42′10″E
  - elevation: 50 m (160 ft)
- Length: 51 km (32 mi)

Basin features
- Progression: Mangaone River → Tūtaekurī River → Ngaruroro River → Hawke Bay → Pacific Ocean
- River system: Tūtaekurī River
- Cities: Te Pōhue, Rissington, Dartmoor
- Tributaries
  - left: Wakinakitangata Stream, Pokopoko Stream, Glenshee Stream, Deep Stream, Peninsula Stream, Tiokapu Stream, Parakohi Stream,
  - right: Mangarangiora Stream, Pātoka Stream, Mangahina Stream, Glenroy Stream, Pekapeka Stream, Waiiti Stream
- Bridges: Rissington Bridge, Dartmoor Bridge

The Mangaone River is a river of the Hawke's Bay region of New Zealand's North Island. Its begins at the confluence of Waipuna Stream and Kings Stream, which originate from the Te Waka Range in the Rukumoana Forest area. The river flows southeast then south through rugged hill country until it meets the Tūtaekurī River. For most of its course it is deeply incised in the tephra, ignimbrite and lapilli volcanic rocks, which are a bit over 30,000 years old. The deep valleys are partly due to the soft rocks and partly to the rapid rise of the Mohaka Fault, at over 3 mm (0.12 in) a year.

== History ==
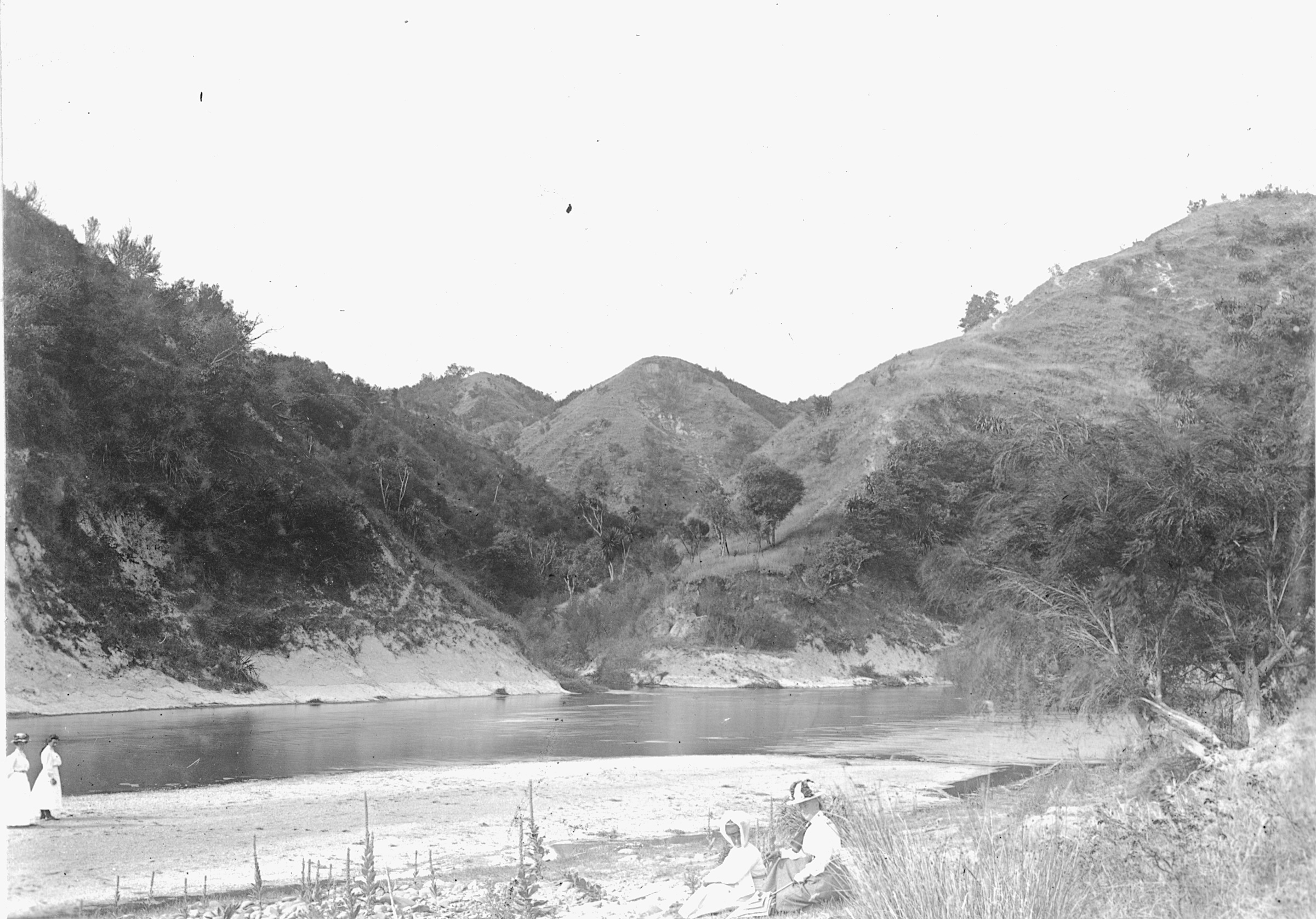
The Mangaone River at Rissington in 1909

Totara was being felled along the river in the 1860s. The river suffers from pollution by nitrogen and phosphorus.

After Cyclone Gabrielle in February 2023, Rissington bridge was replaced by a 43 m (141 ft) long Bailey bridge on 31 March 2023 and Dartmoor bridge on 5 April 2023. They are the only bridges over the river.

== See also ==
- List of rivers of New Zealand
