= Katherine Browning =

British teacher in New Zealand

- Born: 28 February 1864; Oxford, England
- Died: 13 April 1946 (aged 82); London, England
- Education: Girton College
- Scientific career
- Fields: education, theosophy
- Workplaces: Napier Girls' High School, Otago Girls' High School

Katherine Browning (28 February 1864 – 13 April 1946) was a New Zealand teacher, who published one of the only four papers by women in the Royal Society of New Zealand's Transactions before 1900.

== Early life and education ==
Browning was born 28 February 1864 in Oxford, England, to parents James Terry Browning, a businessman, and Hannah née Ransome. She was educated at a private girls' boarding school in Reading, and then studied at Girton College, Cambridge from 1883. Browning completed the Moral Sciences Tripos in 1886, which at the time would have included moral philosophy, logic, economics and psychology, but could not sit the examination due to illness.

She was an assistant mistress at Ramsgate High School in 1887.

== Career in New Zealand ==
In 1888, Browning emigrated to New Zealand, to take a position as assistant mistress for mathematics at Napier Girls' High School, which was headed by Newnham College alumna Mary Elizabeth Hewett.

It soon became clear to Browning that the Cambridge qualification she held was holding her back relative to New Zealand-educated teachers, as they were appointed as teachers and senior teachers, not assistants, and were paid considerably more. Indeed, Browning's Tripos was considered an honours degree, outranking that of her principal. Cambridge University did not award degrees to its female students until 1948, whereas the first woman to graduate from the University of New Zealand, Kate Edger, did so in 1877.

In 1892, Browning tried to get her qualification converted to a Bachelor of Arts through the University of New Zealand, which was an option open to male graduates. She was strongly supported by the Chair of Mathematics at Auckland University College, William Steadman Aldis, and his wife Mary Aldis, who argued that it was unfair for the University of Cambridge not to grant women degrees after taking the same course of study and exams as their male counterparts, and it was equally unfair that the University of New Zealand would not allow them to convert their Tripos to degrees just because of their sex. They also argued that the Cambridge Tripos was a year longer than the New Zealand BA. Despite their arguments, Browning's request was declined.

Browning moved to Otago Girls' High School in 1895, after seven years at Napier, becoming the Senior Mistress and mathematics mistress. Unfortunately Browning and Maria Marchant, the principal, did not see eye to eye on nearly any matter, and Browning was reprimanded in 1899 for not following the principal's orders. In 1902, Browning was reprimanded for setting too much homework and commenting on the principal's orders in front of pupils. A full Board enquiry was held, and Browning resigned later that year. In 1906 Browning was able to graduate from Trinity College Dublin with a Master of Arts in absentia (making her what was known as a steamboat lady).

Browning may have taught briefly at the Braemar Private School for Girls in Dunedin, before, in 1907, taking up a position as Lecturer and Organizer of the Theosophy Society in Dunedin.

== Science ==
Browning was a member of the New Zealand Institute in Hawke's Bay from 1893 to at least 1901 in Dunedin. In July 1892 her paper on after-images, the visual effects of looking at a bright light, was read to the Hawke's Bay chapter, and published in the institute's Transactions the following year.

== Later life ==
Around 1908, Browning travelled to India where she continued to work for the Theosophy Society. In 1915, she was appointed principal of the Women’s College in Varanasi, after which she retired to England.

Back in England, she worked for the Howard League for Penal Reform, the Vegetarian Society and the Non-Smoker’s Union.

Browning died in England on 13 April 1946, aged 82.

== Legacy ==
In 2017, Browning was selected as one of the Royal Society Te Apārangi's "150 women in 150 words", celebrating the contributions of women to knowledge in New Zealand.

== Selected works ==
- Katherine Browning (1893). "After-images". Transactions and Proceedings of the New Zealand Institute. 25: 506–509. ISSN 1176-6158. Wikidata Q104837708.
- Katherine Browning (1901). "On charity organization". Transactions and Proceedings of the New Zealand Institute. 34: 583. ISSN 1176-6158. Wikidata Q104837720.
