= Waikare River =

Waikare River may refer to:

- Waikare River (Northland)
- Waikare River (Bay of Plenty)
- Waikari River (Hawke's Bay) before 1941.

== See also ==
- Waikari River (disambiguation)
