= Mary Aldis (science writer) =

Scientific author & social reformer (1838?–1897)

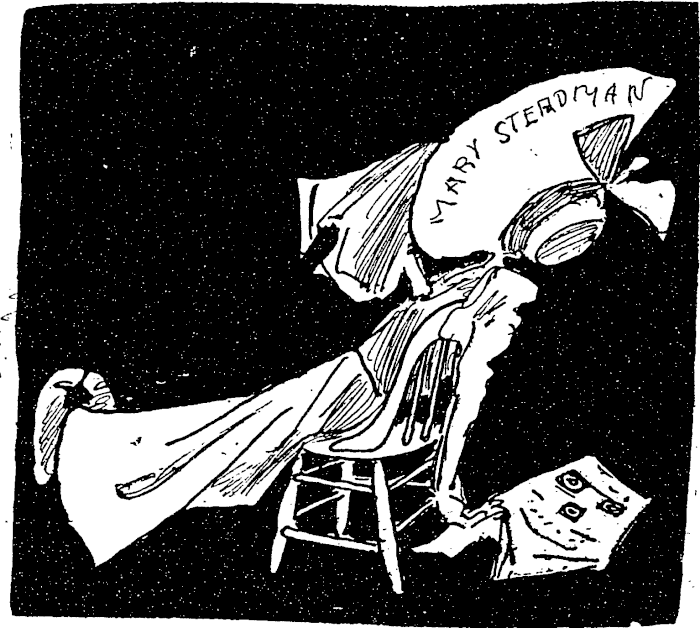
- Cartoon that appeared in the Observer on 27 February 1897, captioned "Grief in the Aldis household. What our Mary thinks of it all."
- Born: Mary Robinson; 1838–40; Kettering, Northamptonshire, England
- Died: June 25, 1897 (aged 57 - 59); Stone in Oxney, Kent, England
- Other names: Mary Steadman Aldis
- Citizenship: British
- Spouse: William Steadman Aldis
- Children: 3
- Scientific career
- Fields: astronomy, mathematics education, social reform

Mary Steadman Aldis née Robinson (1838? – 25 June 1897) was a British science writer and social reformer known for her advocacy on a range of issues during the late 19th century. Born in Kettering, Northamptonshire, to Charlotte and the Reverend William Robinson, she married mathematician William Steadman Aldis in 1863.

Together, the Aldises advocated for social reform across numerous causes, from challenging New Zealand's Contagious Diseases Act 1869 to campaigning against legal prostitution in India. Mary Aldis agitated for women's access to higher education, championing the campaign for female admission to Durham University and pushing for formal recognition through degrees, culminating in the groundbreaking Newcastle Memorial petition in 1880.

In addition to her activism, Aldis authored two books and edited a third. Her work "The Giant Arithmos," a mathematics book tailored for mothers educating their children at home, was praised for its innovative approach and accessibility. Her fascination with astronomy resulted in the publication of "Consider the Heavens" in 1895, offering a popular and engaging introduction to the celestial realm.

Based in New Zealand from 1883 to 1897, Mary Aldis engaged in public discourse, employing her writing to challenge the prevailing norms and prejudices of her time. Her letters and articles in local newspapers ignited discussions on a wide range of issues, from gender equality and women's suffrage to education and workers' rights. Despite encountering criticism and backlash, Aldis remained resolute, earning both support and admiration for her unyielding commitment to justice and social reform. After her husband’s dismissal from his university position, the Aldises returned to England in 1897 and Aldis died there in June the same year. In recognition of her enduring contributions, she was honoured by the Royal Society of New Zealand as one of their "150 women in 150 words" in 2017.

== Early life ==
Aldis was born between 1838 and 1840, in Kettering, Northamptonshire. Her parents were Charlotte and the Reverend William Robinson, a pastor at the Baptist Church on St Andrews Street, Cambridge. In 1863, she married William Steadman Aldis (1839–1928), the son of another Baptist minister, the Reverend John Aldis of London. Steadman Aldis had been Senior Wrangler at Cambridge, but did not secure a College appointment due to his non-Conformist status.

Both Aldis and her husband were active in social reform efforts, commenting on matters relating to vaccination, vivisection, atrocities in Jamaica and the Congo, and women's access to higher education. Aldis was also active in efforts to get New Zealand's Contagious Diseases Act 1869 repealed, and to end legalised prostitution in India. Aldis is considered one of the leaders in the campaign to allow women to enter Durham University. She spoke publicly about the unfair treatment received by women students at Cambridge University, who were at that point only allowed to sit the Tripos by special permission, and could only gain a certificate in recognition of their success. In 1880, together with her husband, Aldis circulated a petition (known as the Newcastle Memorial) urging the university to allow women students to be admitted by right and to earn formal degrees. The petition gained 8,000 signatures, and was followed by a vote in 1881 in which the Senate granted women the right to sit the Tripos, but not to earn a degree.

In 1883, Steadman Aldis was offered the Foundation Chair in Mathematics at the Auckland University College, and the Aldis family arrived in Auckland in November 1883, in time for the 1884 term, and settled in Mount Eden.

== Published work ==
Aldis published two books and edited a third. The Giant Arithmos was a mathematics book aimed at mothers educating their children at home, published in 1882. A review in the New Zealand press was positive, saying "The child, at the conclusion of these lessons, will have a better understanding of the meaning and intention of figures than if he had battered his poor little head against the hard rules of the approved school-books for a whole year. We are glad to have resident in our midst a lady who has done so excellent a service for the little ones." Another reviewer advised all parents who really care for their children to buy the book.

In 1895, Aldis published Consider the heavens, a 224-page popular introduction to astronomy. It was published by the Religious Tract Society, and contained religious quotations throughout, however in Ladies in the Laboratory III, Mary Creese considered it "a scientifically informative work, written in a personal conversational style, that draws along the ordinary reader". Creese noted that unlike many other astronomical works at the time, Aldis did not set much store on Schiaparelli's channels on Mars that some claimed were evidence of life, but instead focused on spectroscopic analysis of the planet. Steadman Aldis had ordered astronomy slides from California and taken charge of a donated telescope, which were presumably useful to Aldis in her work.

Aldis abbreviated and reissued an out-of-print work on religious doctrine previously published by her father. She also edited an occasional column for young people in The New Zealand Herald.

== Campaign for social reform ==
Amy Aldis, in her short biography of her father, notes that her parents were disturbed by the openly licensed prostitution they observed in Auckland, and resolved to agitate against it, even if it cost him the professorship. As newcomers, they resolved to abstain from public protest for two years.

By 1886, Steadman Aldis was complaining about dishonesty in New Zealand politicians, and Aldis had begun a letter-writing career that historian Keith Sinclair considered made her "for ten years, the most literate, persuasive, partisan, and advanced of writers in the columns of the local Press". Both Aldis and her husband opposed New Zealand's Contagious Diseases Act 1869, under which women suspected of prostitution could be forcibly examined, and restrained for treatment. They argued that the same provisions should apply to men found in brothels, but also that the act was immoral, and ineffective as a public health measure. Historian James Keating writes that Aldis was "a social purity campaigner whose postal activism inflamed a trans-imperial scandal concerning New Zealand’s Contagious Diseases Act".

In January 1887, Aldis wrote to protest the council allowing a woman to be fired from a cannon (the mayor replied that they did not have powers to stop it, and the performance went ahead). She also questioned a lead article that objected to ladies teaching at Auckland Girls' High School, and advocated for female immigration of women suitable for colonists' wives, and for equal pay for female teachers. Aldis even wrote to the Englishwoman's Review warning prospective colonists that women would not get equal pay for equal work, and describing the moral tone of the colony as "terribly low". She expressed her views on secular education and the fairness of taxing dissenters. Their pacifist views also led Aldis and her husband to speak out against the proposed military salute after the Duke of Clarence died in 1892, and to object to the rifle practice of the local Volunteers as a waste of money.

In 1890, the Typesetter's Association voted to exclude women from the printing industry. They argued that the work was too demanding for women, even though women had been typesetting for 15 years by this point, and also that women were being used as a source of cheap labour, which was driving male typesetters to take jobs in Australia. Aldis called the association's actions a "war on women", and accused David Fisher, the union head, of hypocrisy: the union complained of landgrabbers and capitalists taking wealth from the poor man, but were trying to do the same to working women. Public opinion was against the union, and they backed down, although the Factories Act 1891 achieved some of their aims by restricting the starting age for apprenticeships for women to 15 (as opposed to 13 or 14 for men) and allowing them only to work between 8 am and 6 pm, thus preventing them from working on morning papers.

In 1892, Aldis and her husband supported Katherine Browning, a teacher who completed the Tripos at Girton College and wanted to convert it to a Bachelor of Arts through the University of New Zealand, an option that was available to male students. The university declined.

Aldis's views often received anonymous responses, she was called "bereft of all human sympathy", accused of "shriek[ing] against giving the police any power over young girls engaged in the traffic of shame", and her letters were called "balderdash" and "sickly effusions". One respondent even questioned why she had been born, although in contrast a Presbyterian minister was reported to have said "Mrs. Aldis, all the bad men in Auckland hate you". Historian J. A. Froude met the Aldises several times, and described them as "of the elect of cultivated man and womankind", and Mary Aldis as "a lady as accomplished and gifted as [her husband]". Other contemporary responses to Aldis's campaigning acknowledged her support for votes for women, and that she was "deserving of commendation for dealing frankly and courageously with social questions affecting the welfare of her sex". It was considered worth noting in The New Zealand Herald that when Aldis signed the Suffrage Petition, she described her occupation as "writer", rather than the more common "domestic duties" or "gentlewoman".

By 1893, Steadman Aldis had been dismissed with six months' notice from the university. He had disagreements with the University Council, particularly the Chairman Sir Maurice O'Rorke. No complaints had been recorded about Steadman Aldis's teaching; his students liked him; and he was regarded as good at his job, so it is likely that the public agitation was a factor in his dismissal. In particular O'Rorke was known to be a heavy drinker, whereas the Aldises were active in the temperance movement. Although a number of prominent people rose in his defence, including Sir George Grey, Sir Robert Stout, and Sir William Fox, supporters of his dismissal claimed his large salary (£800 per annum) was unaffordable. A public campaign in England to discourage other mathematicians from taking the vacated post may also have worked against him.

== Return to England ==
In early 1897, Steadman Aldis, Aldis and their daughter Amy returned to England, and settled in Kent.

Aldis died on 25 June 1897, in Stone-in-Oxney, Kent, after "much suffering", but news did not reach New Zealand until 10 August that year. New Zealand newspapers at the time called her a "noted controversialist and opponent of the C.D. Act". A kinder reference made mention of her sincerity, courage and ability. "The Critic", in Sydney described Aldis as "a blue-stocking, a violent, aggressive Wesleyan, a woman's rightist, and a strong anti everythingarian [sic]. Also, she had the very worst case of cacœthes scribendi [mania to write] this deponent ever encountered."

== Family ==
Creese reported Aldis as having a daughter, and two sons who both became artists. This may be an error. (Note: Creese refers to Elijah and Albert Edward Aldis. Her source is the Fletcher Collection website. However more recent sources regard Elijah as Albert's father, and do not describe any relationship to Mary Steadman Aldis or her husband.) Census records from 1871 show the Aldises had three children: Isabel, Morton and Amy Laetitia. Isabel married in England in 1886 and presumably did not come to New Zealand with her parents. Morton Aldis was a lawyer and author, and died in Auckland in 1948. He is buried in Hillsborough Cemetery.

Amy Laetita Aldis accompanied her parents to New Zealand, and wrote a brief biography of her father to accompany personal papers held by the University of Auckland. She returned to England, but continued to follow her mother's footsteps in writing to the New Zealand press on social issues. Her last letter appears to be a plea for New Zealand to accept Czechoslovak refugees in 1938, in which she says "40 years ago I remember New Zealand as a remarkably hospitable place". She died in 1947.

== Legacy ==
In 2017, Aldis was selected as one of the Royal Society of New Zealand's 150 women in 150 words.

== Selected works ==
- Mary Aldis (1882), Great giant arithmos, a most elementary arithmetic., London: Macmillan Publishers, OCLC 933797284, OL 18071425W, Wikidata Q104655727
- Mary Aldis (1895), Consider the Heavens. A popular introduction to astronomy., London: Religious Tract Society, p. 224, OCLC 557337747, Wikidata Q104656398
- Mary Aldis (January 1891). "A Story of University Tests". The Westminster Review. 135 (1): 611–634. Wikidata Q104783788.
- Mary Aldis (July 1891). "Complements and Compliments". The Westminster Review. 136 (1): 173–183. Wikidata Q104783789.
- Mary Aldis (March 1893). "Thou Art the Man". The Contemporary Review (in undetermined language). 63: 387–393. ISSN 0010-7565. Wikidata Q104783790.
- Mary Aldis (March 1890). "Reminiscences of a Church-Rate Struggle". The Contemporary Review (in undetermined language). 57: 421–439. ISSN 0010-7565. Wikidata Q104783791.
