= Amy Hutchinson (weaver) =

New Zealand artist and weaver (1874–1971)

Amy Hadfield Hutchinson (20 May 1874 – 20 July 1971) was a New Zealand school hostel matron, spinner and weaver, community leader.

Amy Hadfield Large was born in Napier, Hawke's Bay, New Zealand, on 20 May 1874. She attended Napier Girls' High School until 1889 and then studied for an extra-mural university degree, but failed the final exams in 1894. From 1901 until 1904 she was the matron at Napier Girls' High School, responsible for care of boarding pupils. The school's headmistress, Bessie Spencer, played an important role throughout her life.

In 1907 she married a sheepfarmer, Francis (Frank) Hutchinson, and they lived at the Omatua farm near Rissington, Hawke's Bay with Spencer joining them in 1911, although left for Britain in 1916. Hutchinson developed practical classes for local children and then during the First World War she started a Red Cross group as well as starting a group for spinning, dying and weaving wool. The latter developed into greater knowledge of dyes from New Zealand plants and lichens, and installation of a loom from Britain when Spencer returned in 1921. They demonstrated and wrote about these wool processing skills and Hutchinson compiled this into the book Plant dyeing : reprints and repetitions that was published in 1941, followed by four further editions.

Hutchinson participated in founding the Napier Society of Arts and Crafts, along with the artist Roland Hipkins., and was made a life member of Hawke's Bay Art Gallery and Museum. After her husband died in 1940 she moved back to Napier with Spencer, where she died in 1971.
