= Cyclone Gabrielle =

Category 3 South Pacific cyclone in 2023

Severe Tropical Cyclone Gabrielle
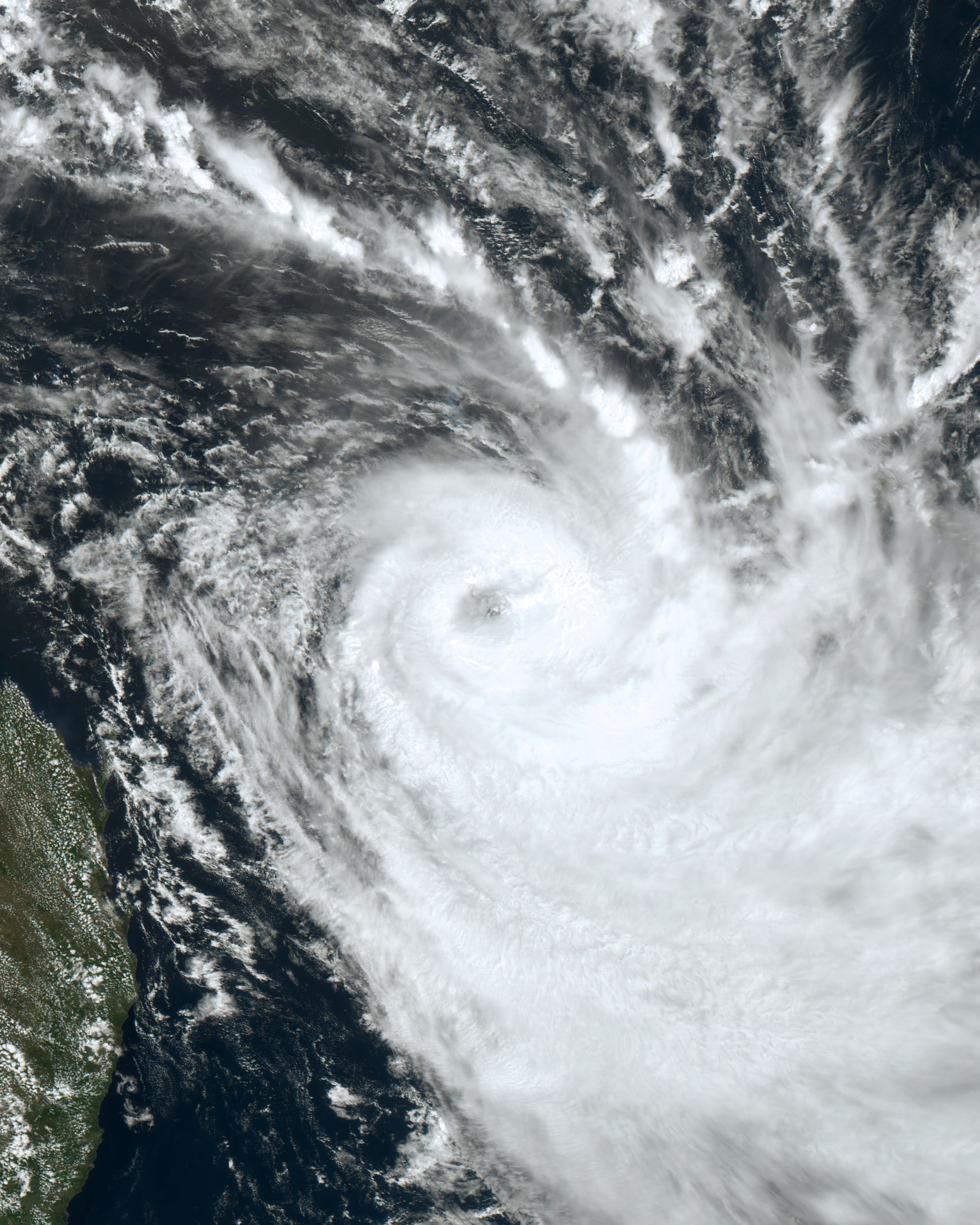
- Cyclone Gabrielle shortly before its peak intensity on 10 February

Meteorological history
- Formed: 5 February 2023
- Subtropical: 11 February 2023
- Dissipated: 16 February 2023

Category 3 severe tropical cyclone
- 10-minute sustained (BOM)
- Highest winds: 150 km/h (90 mph)
- Lowest pressure: 959 hPa (mbar); 28.32 inHg

Category 4 severe tropical cyclone
- 10-minute sustained (FMS)
- Highest winds: 165 km/h (105 mph)
- Lowest pressure: 958 hPa (mbar); 28.29 inHg

Category 2-equivalent tropical cyclone
- 1-minute sustained (SSHWS/JTWC)
- Highest winds: 165 km/h (105 mph)
- Lowest pressure: 958 hPa (mbar); 28.29 inHg

Overall effects
- Fatalities: 15 (11 direct, 4 indirect)
- Missing: 1
- Damage: $9.2 billion (2023 USD) (Costliest tropical cyclone in the Southern Hemisphere)
- Areas affected: Vanuatu, Solomon Islands, Norfolk Island, New Zealand
- IBTrACS /
- Part of the 2022–23 South Pacific and Australian region cyclone seasons

Severe Tropical Cyclone Gabrielle was a powerful and destructive tropical cyclone that devastated parts of the North Island of New Zealand and affected parts of Vanuatu and Norfolk Island in February 2023. It is the costliest tropical cyclone on record in the Southern Hemisphere, with total damage estimated to be NZ$14.5 billion (US$9.2 billion), of which NZ$3.18 billion (US$2 billion) consisted of insured losses. It was also the deadliest cyclone and weather event overall to hit New Zealand since Cyclone Giselle in 1968, surpassing Cyclone Bola in 1988. As the fifth named storm of the 2022–23 Australian region cyclone season and the first severe tropical cyclone of the 2022–23 South Pacific cyclone season, it was first noted as a developing tropical low on 6 February 2023, while it was located south of the Solomon Islands, before it was classified as a tropical cyclone and named Gabrielle by the Bureau of Meteorology. The system peaked as a Category 3 severe tropical cyclone before moving into the South Pacific basin, then transitioned into a subtropical cyclone on 11 February 2023.

Norfolk Island was placed under a red alert as Gabrielle approached, while heavy rain and wind warnings were issued across the North Island of New Zealand. Existing states of emergency in Auckland and Coromandel due to the 2023 Auckland Anniversary Weekend floods were extended, and new states of emergency were declared in other areas. The cyclone impacted New Zealand from 11 to 17 February 2023, with a national state of emergency being declared on 14 February 2023. All states of emergency had been lifted by 14 March.

== Meteorological history ==
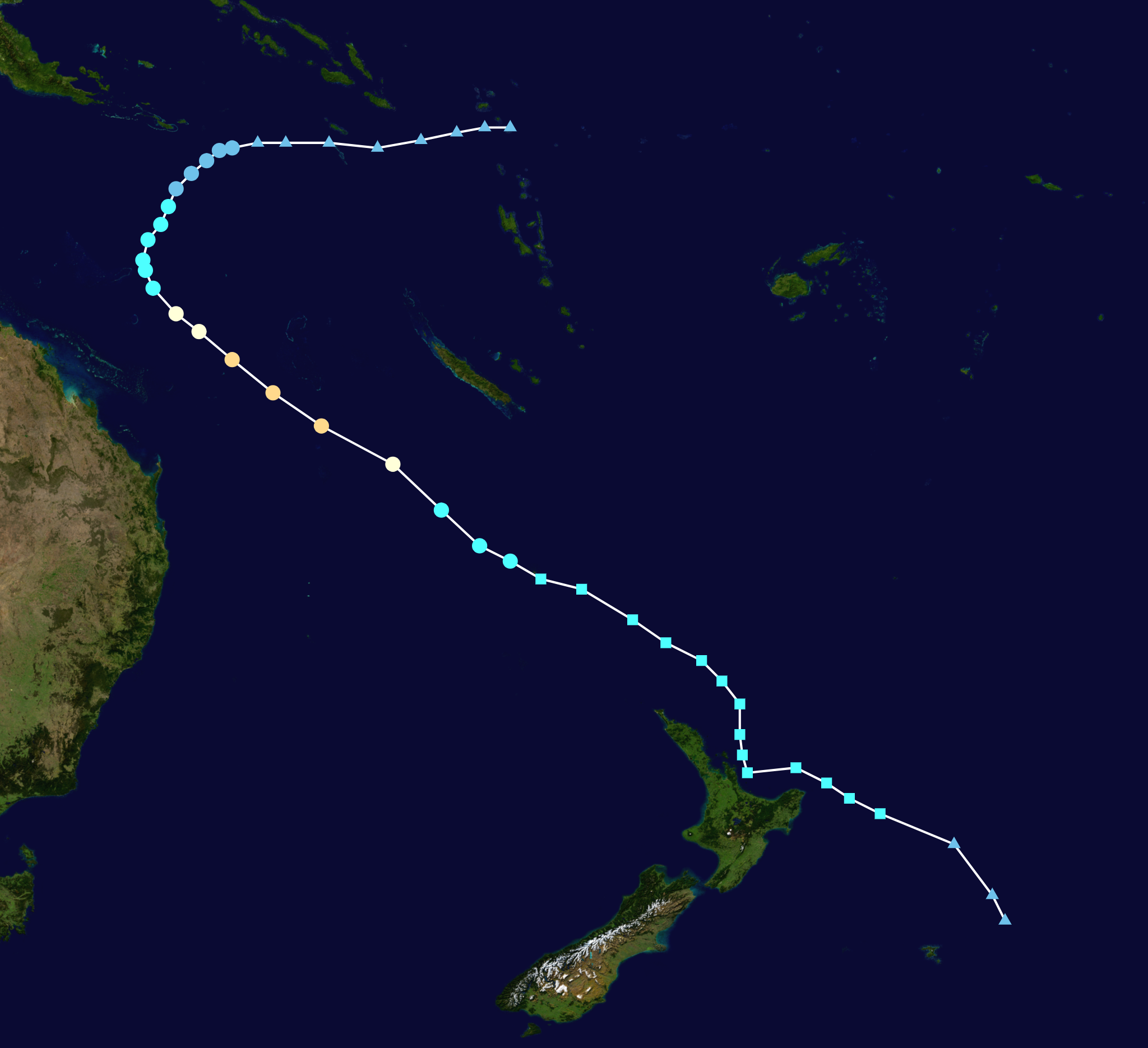
Map plotting the storm's track and intensity, according to the Saffir–Simpson scale Map key Saffir–Simpson scale Tropical depression (≤38 mph, ≤62 km/h) Tropical storm (39–73 mph, 63–118 km/h) Category 1 (74–95 mph, 119–153 km/h) Category 2 (96–110 mph, 154–177 km/h) Category 3 (111–129 mph, 178–208 km/h) Category 4 (130–156 mph, 209–251 km/h) Category 5 (≥157 mph, ≥252 km/h) Unknown Storm type Tropical cyclone Subtropical cyclone Extratropical cyclone, remnant low, tropical disturbance, or monsoon depression

On 5 February, the Australian Bureau of Meteorology (BoM) reported that Tropical Low 14U had developed within a monsoonal trough of low pressure over the northeastern Coral Sea, about 400 km (250 mi) to the southeast of Honiara in the Solomon Islands. During that day, the system passed near or over Rennell Island in the Solomon Islands as it moved westwards into the Australian region from the South Pacific basin. At this stage, the system was located within a favourable environment for further development with low vertical wind shear of 10–30 km/h (5–15 mph) and warm sea surface temperatures of 29–30 °C (84–86 °F). Over the next two days, the system gradually developed further as it moved south-westwards along a ridge of high pressure towards Queensland, Australia, before the United States Joint Typhoon Warning Center initiated advisories and classified it as Tropical Cyclone 12P during 8 February. At around the same time, the BoM reported that the tropical low had developed into a Category 1 tropical cyclone on the Australian tropical cyclone intensity scale and named it Gabrielle.

Gabrielle slowly drifted southwards while deep convection consolidated, and the cyclone was upgraded into a Category 2 tropical cyclone, while the JTWC upgraded Gabrielle to the equivalent of a low-end Category 1-equivalent cyclone with winds of 120 km/h (75 mph). By 18:00 UTC on 9 February, the storm continued to intensify and soon became a Category 3 severe tropical cyclone. During 10 February as Gabrielle moved back into the South Pacific basin, the BoM reported that Gabrielle had peaked as a Category 3 severe tropical cyclone with 10-minute sustained windspeeds of 150 km/h (90 mph). Gabrielle began to experience an increase in northwesterly vertical wind shear, the JTWC downgraded it to a Category 1-equivalent cyclone. On 10 February, Gabrielle moved into MetService's area of responsibility. The JTWC also discontinued warnings on the system around 21:00 UTC that day Gabrielle was downgraded to a Category 2 tropical cyclone by the MetService. During 11 February, after Gabrielle had passed directly over Norfolk Island, the BoM and MetService reported that Gabrielle had weakened into a deep subtropical cyclone.

== Preparations ==
=== Norfolk Island ===
The Australian territory of Norfolk Island was placed under a red alert as Gabrielle approached. Australian military and emergency personnel were on standby and ready to respond. The Emergency Management Norfolk Island (EMNI) sent out a warning on Saturday afternoon, advising people to stay inside and announcing that most businesses would close.

=== New Zealand ===
Heavy rain and wind warnings were issued for across the North Island of New Zealand as Gabrielle approached the country, including red heavy rain warnings in Northland, Auckland, Coromandel, Gisborne District, and Hawke's Bay, and red wind warnings in Northland, Auckland, Coromandel Peninsula, and Taranaki. New Zealand forecasters at MetService and Weatherwatch saw more than a week in advance that it would be one of the biggest storms in a generation. The cyclone directly caused 11 fatalities in New Zealand, with total deaths reaching 15 including indirect fatalities.

During 9 February, states of emergency in place in Auckland and the Coromandel Peninsula as a result of earlier floods were extended in anticipation of Gabrielle's arrival, while a precautionary state of emergency was declared in Northland on 12 February. Many residents across the upper North Island who had been affected by earlier flooding prepared themselves for the cyclone, while emergency services were on high alert. Residents were warned that power cuts were likely and it was suggested that people withdraw some cash because electronic payment systems would not work in a power cut. People were encouraged to have three days of supplies.

Air New Zealand cancelled many domestic and international flights as the cyclone approached, while Bluebridge and Interislander cancelled Cook Strait ferry crossings. The Ministry of Education advised Auckland schools to close, but the decision remained with individual boards of trustees. Prime Minister Chris Hipkins said citizens should take the severe weather warning seriously and make sure they were prepared. Some authorities compared the likely effect of Gabrielle with the effects of Cyclone Hola (2018) and the devastating Cyclone Bola (1988).

== Effects ==
Cyclone Gabrielle intensifying off the coast of Australia on 8–9 February

=== Melanesia ===
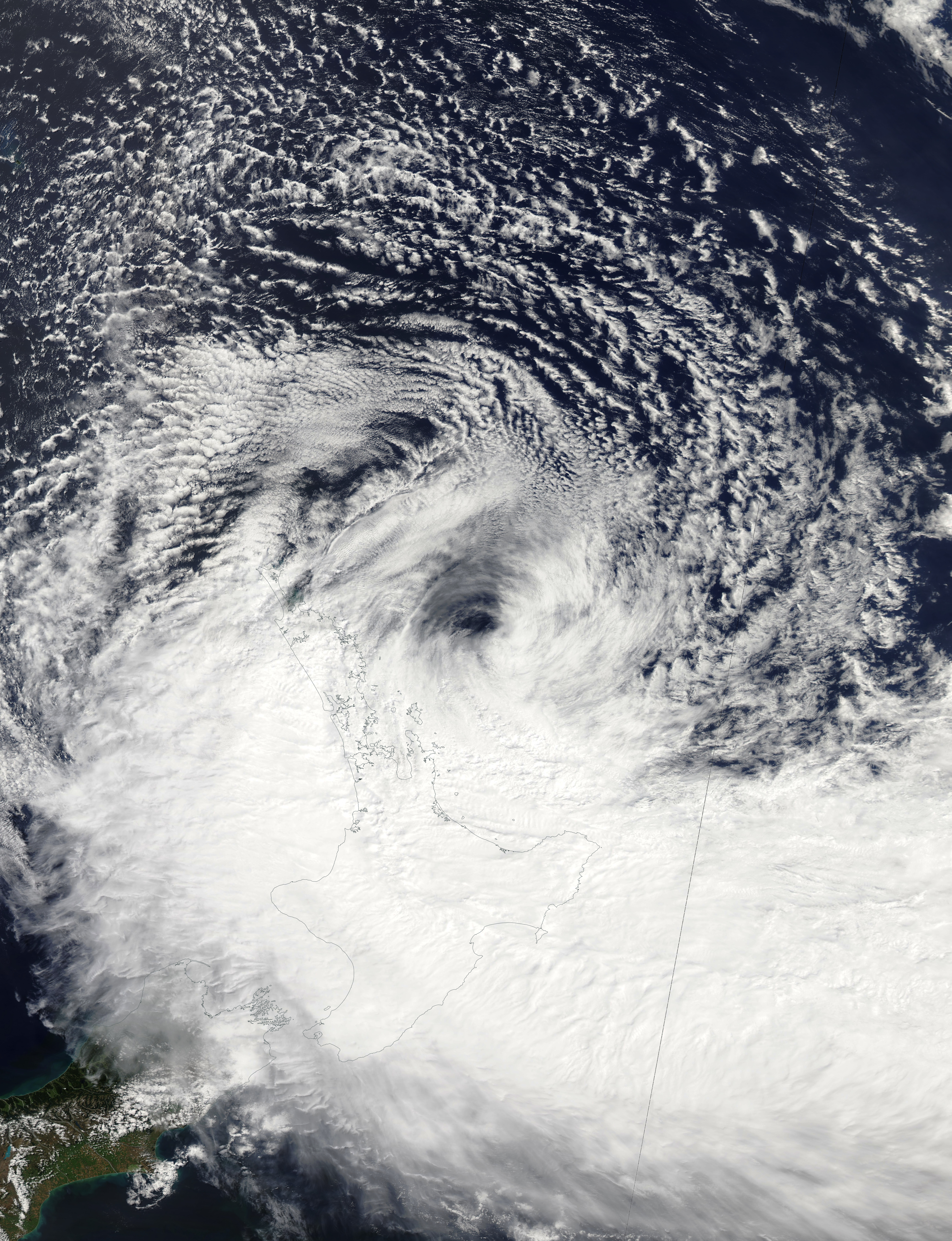
Gabrielle nearing the North Island on 13 February

In Vanuatu, Malpoi, a village in the northwest of Espiritu Santo, was severely affected by landslides, mud, and the destruction of houses and gardens. The water supply was also contaminated. As their plantations were damaged by the landslide, chairman Allan Taman of Vanuatu's Santo Sunset Environment Network stated that the villagers may require long-term financial assistance. Some villagers in the disaster-affected areas were also forced to evacuate. In New Caledonia, strong swell warnings were put in place for 16 districts; 14 boats were damaged and one sank due to wind and swells, leading to an evacuation plan for the damaged ships.

=== Norfolk Island ===
During 11 February, Gabrielle passed directly over Norfolk Island. The cyclone brought down trees and disrupted power, several roofs were slightly damaged, and one building on nearby Phillip Island was destroyed. Norfolk Island's emergency controller George Plant said there had been 40 calls for help, but the damage was "manageable".

=== New Zealand ===
The cyclone brought gale-force winds to the North Island. During 12 February, areas of the upper North Island began experiencing widespread power outages and property damage as the outer edges of the cyclone swept the country, with over 225,000 homes losing power as conditions worsened through 13 and 14 February. Severe flooding occurred, while some buildings had their roofs torn off in the wind or were damaged by landslides. Over 140,000 landslides were mapped following the cyclone. Numerous roads across the North Island were closed due to flooding and high winds, including Auckland Harbour Bridge. Hundreds of people across the North Island were mandatorily evacuated, while hundreds more self-evacuated. An estimated 10,000 people were displaced as a result of the cyclone. 1,720 claims of injuries were accepted by ACC. On 23 February, there were 6,960 reports of people uncontactable. By 19 February, Hipkins confirmed that 3,200 people were registered as uncontactable, though he stated that the number was expected to drop, while the direct death toll rose to 11. Hipkins confirmed that 28,000 homes, mostly in Napier and Hastings, still had no power. Hundreds of police staff worked on locating people and every person uncontactable was finally accounted for on 7 March, except for one man who disappeared north of Napier on the morning of 14 February. The search for the man ended in October 2025, with his death being added to a joint coroner's inquest into the deaths caused by the cyclone. A man died in Australia on 27 June, with his family claiming that the stress after losing his home in the cyclone had detrimental effects on his health which he never recovered from. Three self-inflicted deaths in the months following the cyclone have also been linked to events caused by the weather.

Costliest South Pacific Ocean tropical cyclones
Rank	Tropical cyclones	Season	Damage USD	Refs
1	3 Gabrielle	2022–23	$9.2 billion	
2	TD 06F	2022–23	$1.43 billion	
3	5 Winston	2015–16	$1.4 billion	
4	5 Harold	2019–20	$768 million	
5	5 Pam	2014–15	$543 million	
6	5 Judy and Kevin	2022–23	$433 million	
7	4 Val	1991–92	$381 million	
8	5 Lola	2023–24	$352 million	
9	4 Evan	2012–13	$313 million	
10	4 Gita	2017–18	$253 million	

More flooding later occurred in Auckland and Northland on 24 February as rain storms struck the North Island, and weather warnings were issued for Coromandel Peninsula, Auckland and Northland.

==== Northland ====
Extensive flooding occurred across the region, while multiple roads were closed, including SH 1 near the Brynderwyn Range which was closed for the third time in just over a month. Many people across the region lost electricity, phone service, and internet connections. The North Auckland Line was undermined and covered by a 60,000 m^{3} (78,000 yd^{3}), or 35,000 m^{3} (46,000 yd^{3}), slip, just south of Tahekeroa tunnel, as well as about 50 other slips between Swanson and Whangārei. Closure of the railway for up to 3 months was expected.

==== Auckland ====
The West Auckland communities of Piha, Karekare, Waimauku and Muriwai were heavily affected. Two firefighters died after being caught in a landslide in Muriwai. Two people went missing at sea near Great Barrier Island and Northland, but were both later found. 50 apartments were evacuated in Mount Eden on the evening of the 13th after engineers determined strong winds could cause the historic Colonial Ammunition Company Shot Tower to collapse. The tower was demolished a week later. 224 buildings were red stickered across the region, meaning entry is prohibited, 323 were yellow stickered, meaning access is restricted, while 977 were white stickered, meaning minor damage only. Of these, 130 red stickered homes were in the town of Muriwai; nearly a third of all the homes in the town. Of the 600,000 customers connected to the Vector network, 42,000 were without power on 14 February. Most connection problems were fixed by 3 March.

==== Waikato ====
The town of Port Waikato was completely cut off after Gabrielle brought flooding and slips to the area, while a slip behind Maunsell Road impacted a line of houses. In the Coromandel area, the storm was the fifth severe weather event to impact the peninsula that summer, heavily impacting businesses and extending already prolonged road closures.

==== Gisborne ====
The maximum rainfall from Gabrielle was 488 millimetres (19.2 in), which occurred at Hikuwai. A man was found dead at Te Karaka. The potable water supply to the Gisborne urban area was impacted with failures in the distribution system between the water treatment plant and the city. This prompted the use of Emergency Message alerts to residents to 'Stop using Water'. 9 buildings were red stickered across the region, while 149 were yellow stickered. Roading networks were significantly affected with townships along State Highway 35 disconnected. SH35 was closed between Tolaga Bay and Te Puia Springs due to the road being lost south of Te Puia and the Hikuwai Bridge washing out. Many local roads are closed, which further restricts access to communities.

==== Hawke's Bay ====
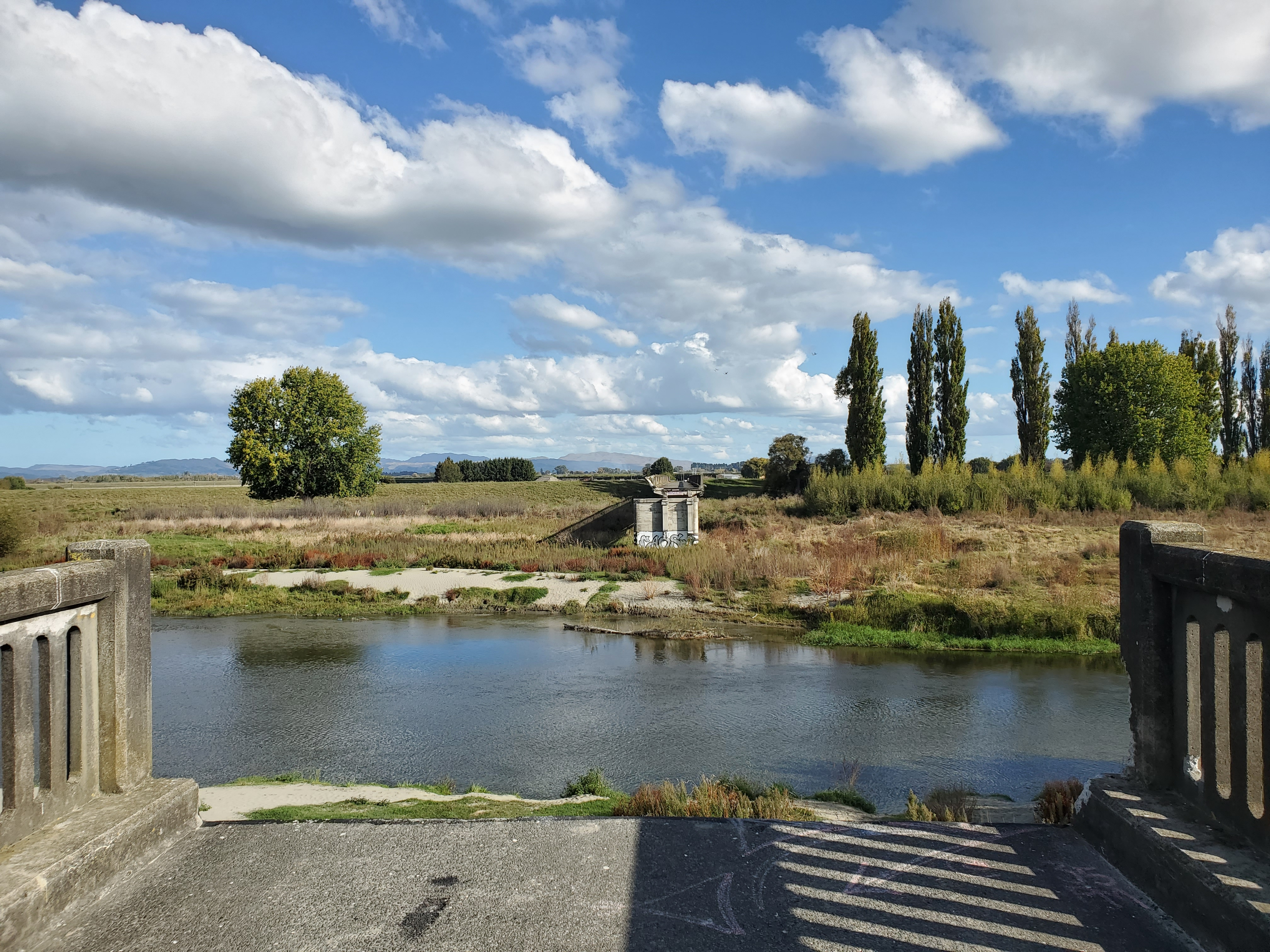
Brookfields Bridge in 2025

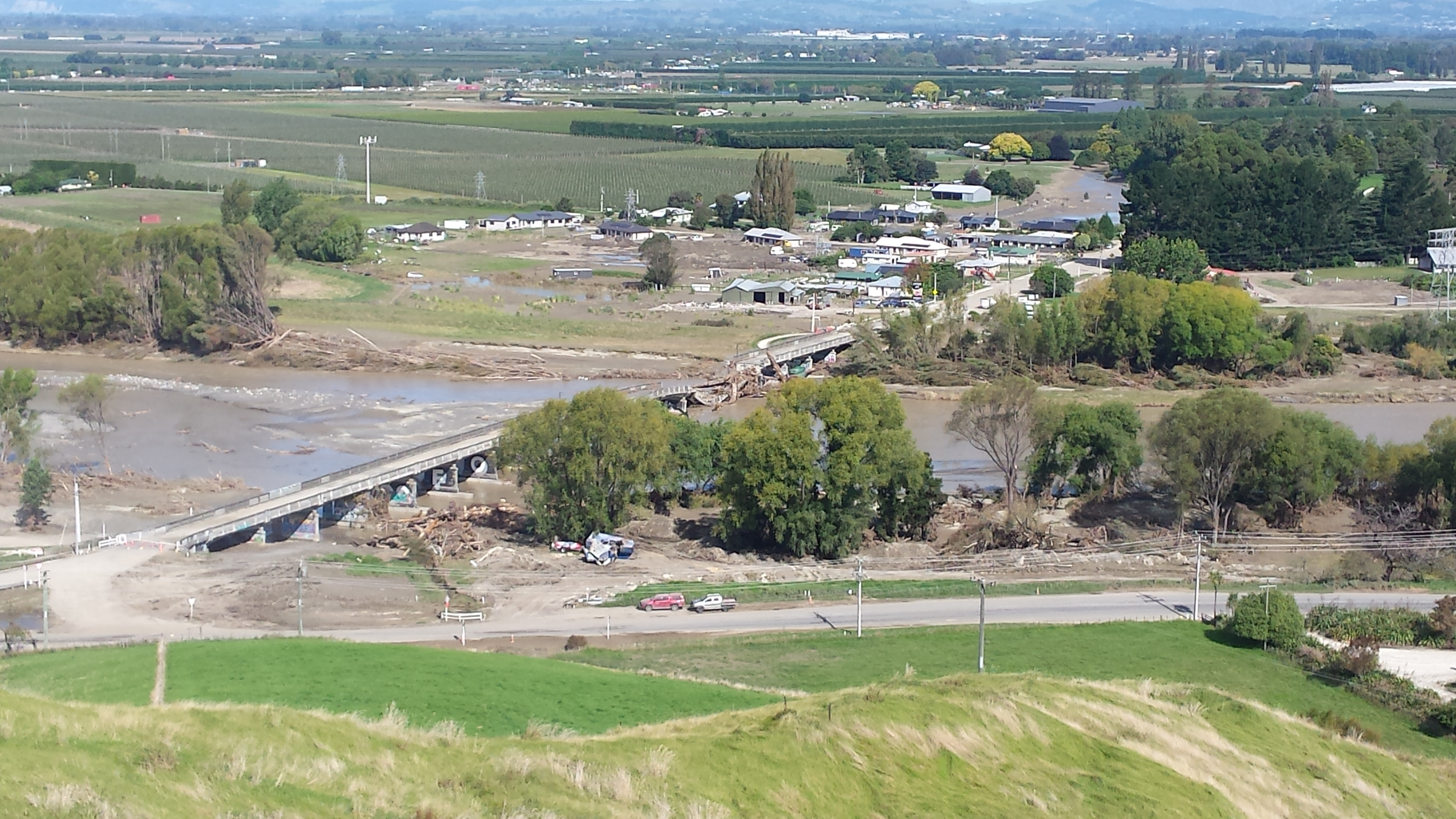
Damage at Redclyffe Bridge and Waiohiki 17 days after the storm

Stopbanks were overtopped by floodwater in Hawke's Bay, caused partly by the buildup of debris at structures such as bridges. Overtopping caused erosion of stopbanks, leading to thirty breaches of them, covering five kilometres. Power was cut to over 40,000 properties, almost 32,000 of them in and around Napier, when the main Redcliffe substation was damaged after the Tūtaekurī River burst its banks, and phone and internet services were lost. People were evacuated from parts of the low-lying Heretaunga Plains surrounding the river, including parts of Taradale, Meeanee, and Awatoto. Nine thousand people were evacuated or self-evacuated across the region by nightfall. Eighty-three buildings across the region were red stickered, while 991 were yellow stickered. Eight people were found dead.

A flash flood swept through the Esk Valley as the Esk River burst its banks, submerging properties under 7 metres of water and burying homes in silt up to their roof lines. One house was moved 600 metres from its original position. The Ngaruroro River burst its banks, flooding the small settlement of Omahu, where 24 people required evacuation by helicopter. Floodwaters washed away spans and piers of a rail bridge between Clive and Napier, and also damaged two other rail bridges just north of Hastings, and the one at Waipawa. They destroyed six road bridges on the Heretaunga Plains and in its hinterland: Brookfields Bridge over the Tūtaekurī at Pakowhai; Redclyffe Bridge, a major crossing of the Tūtaekurī from Taradale to Waiohiki; the Vicarage Road bridge over the Tūtaekurī at the settlement of Puketapu; Dartmoor Bridge over the Mangaone River, a tributary of the Tūtaekurī, between Puketapu and Dartmoor; the Rissington Bridge over the Mangaone in the Rissington area; and a bridge on Hawkston Road in the Patoka area.

Between Napier and Wairoa, the State Highway 2 bridge over the Waikari River just north of Putorino was destroyed. The Wairoa River burst its banks, flooding 10 to 15 percent of Wairoa, containing about half the town's population. Access to Wairoa was cut off after extensive damage on SH2's Mohaka River Bridge in the south, and landslides to the north. A number of bridges in the Wairoa District were destroyed or damaged. The cost in the region was estimated to exceed NZ$5 billion (US$3.17 billion).

Water supply in Central Hawke's Bay failed, and a mandatory evacuation was ordered for eastern Waipawa after the Waipawa River rose to record levels. SH5 linking Napier with Taupō was closed indefinitely following major slips and infrastructure damage, as was SH2 north of Napier and the Napier–Taihape Road to the west. SH2 south linking Hastings with Tararua District was closed temporarily, opening to limited traffic capacity 4 days later. SH5 reopened to freight convoys from 14 March and was open to all traffic from 27 March. The railway to Hastings reopened on 3 April.

==== Manawatū-Whanganui ====
Flooding occurred in Pohangina and Pohangina Valley East, while rivers such as the Rangitīkei, Manawatū and Ōroua flooded or rose, with some extending up to 500m across, and some roads were closed. Widespread destruction occurred in the Tararua District, where flooding damaged or destroyed many roads. The town of Ākitio was completely isolated after all road access to the town was closed.

==== Other regions ====
Evacuations occurred in the Whakatāne and Ōpōtiki Districts, while the storm surge from Gabrielle flooded some homes. Around 3,600 homes lost power in the Bay of Plenty region during the storm, and 75 schools closed.

Strong winds up to 140 km/h battered Taranaki, resulting in power cuts affecting thousands of residents. Many roads both across the wider region and within the city of New Plymouth were closed as a result of fallen trees, resulting in bus cancellations. All schools in Taranaki were closed on 14 February.

Wind gusts up to 146 km/h (91 mph) were recorded in the Wellington region, while heavy rain caused surface flooding and minor slips.

Rainfall of 230 mm (9.06 in) was recorded at Snowflake Ridge in Marlborough. Other stations, including Kaikōura and Picton, recorded totals of 59.8–130 mm (2.35–5.12 in). Wind gusts of up to 93 km/h (58 mph) were recorded at Cape Campbell, and 65 km/h (40 mph) at Kaikōura.

== Responses ==
=== New Zealand ===
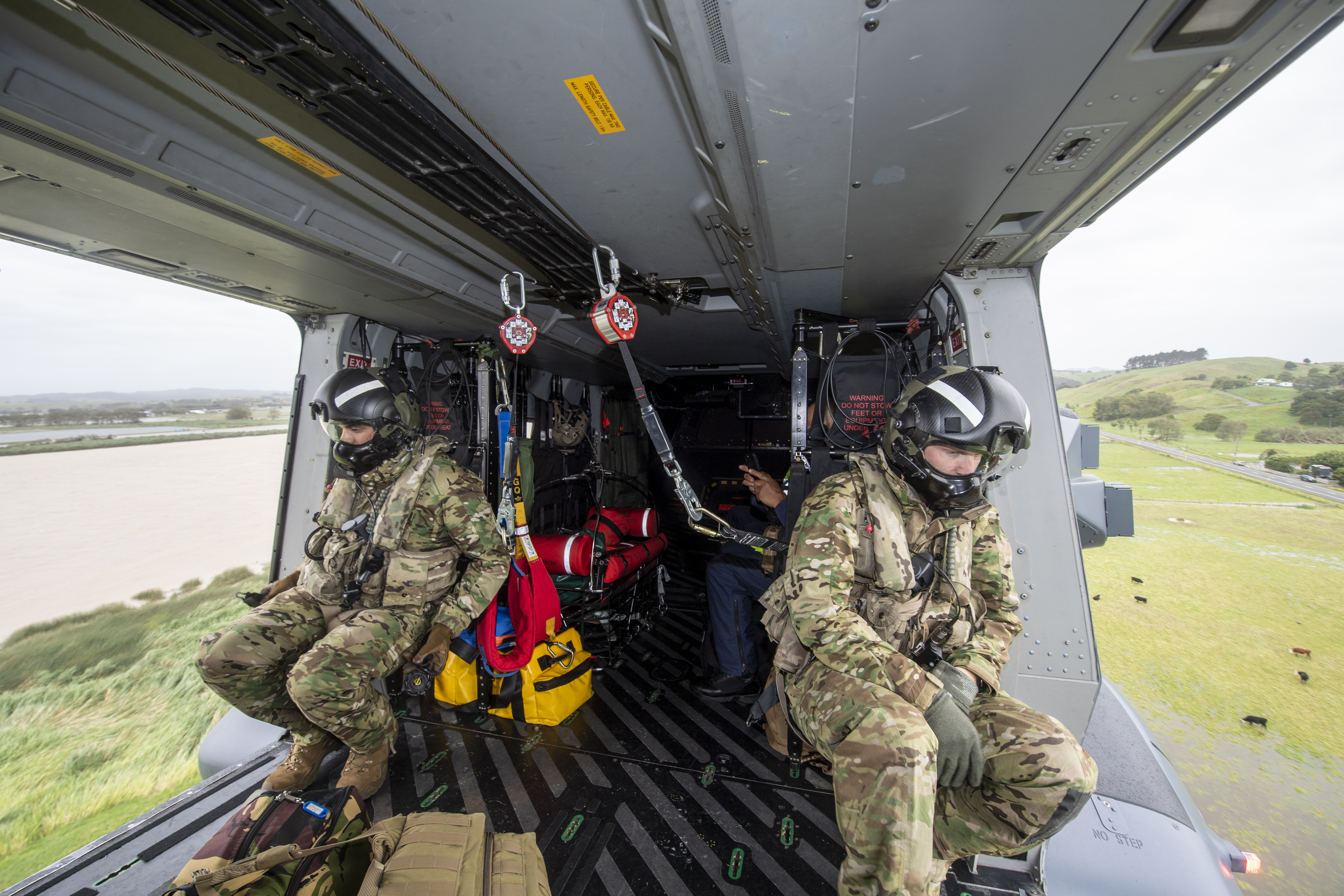
A Royal New Zealand Air Force (RNZAF) helicopter flies from Auckland to Northland in the response to the cyclone

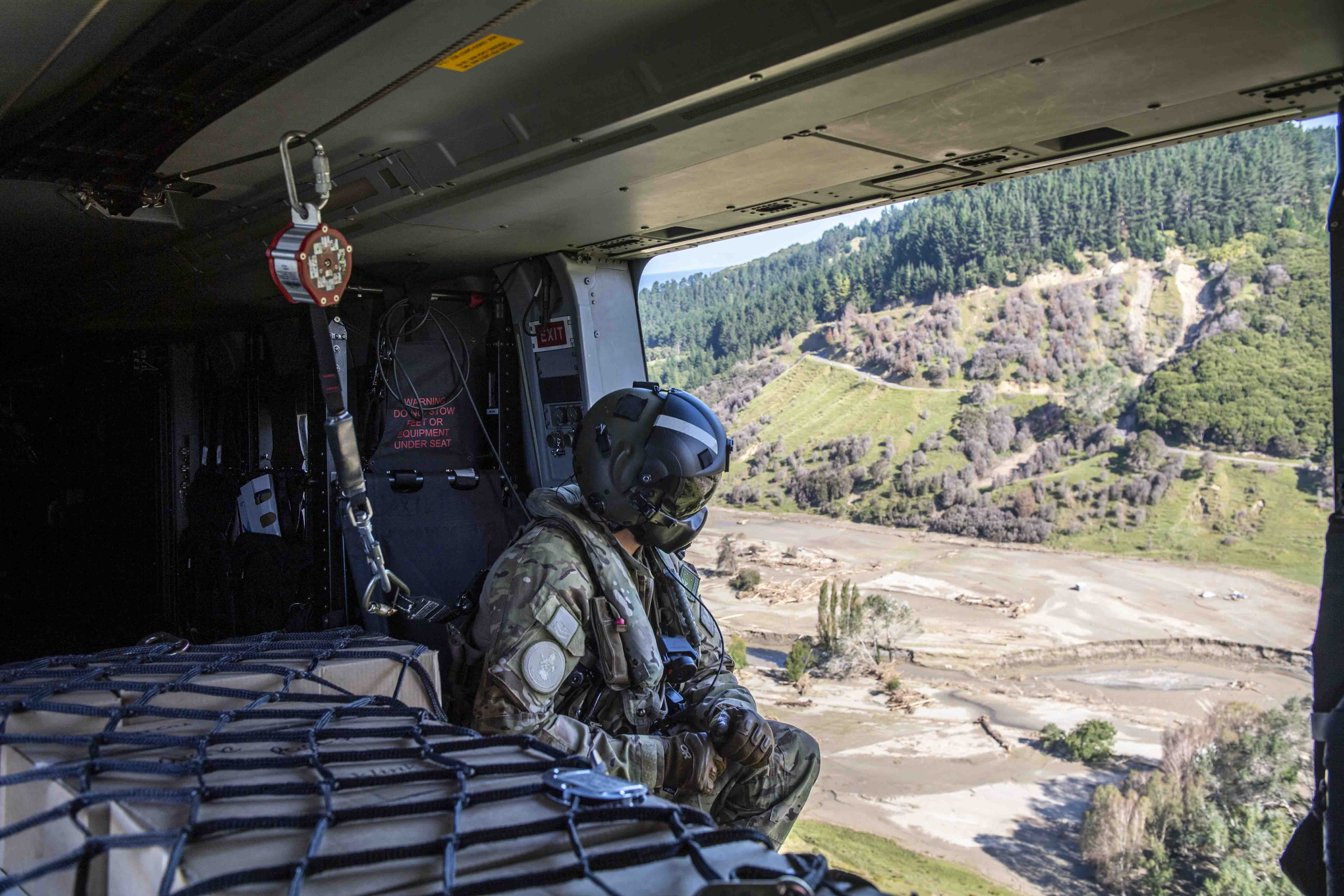
An RNZAF helicopter distributing supplies near the flood-damaged community of Aropaoanui

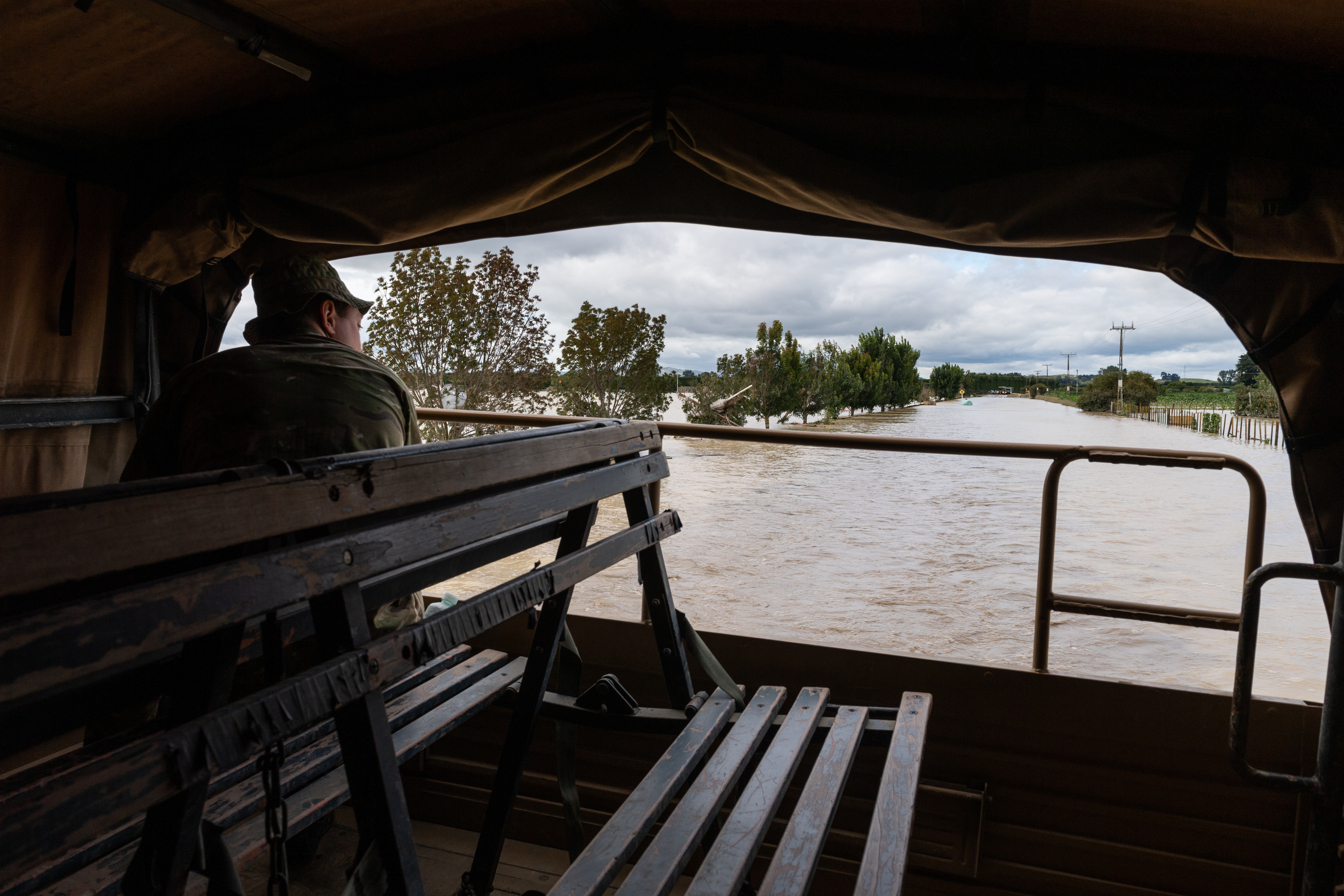
A New Zealand Army unimog travels through flooded roads near Puketapu

==== Emergency response and relief ====
On 14 February 2023, the Minister for Emergency Management (Kieran McAnulty) declared a National State of Emergency. The New Zealand Defence Force deployed three NH90 helicopters with Army personnel, Police, and FENZ to rescue trapped residents from rooftops and flood water in Esk Valley, Hastings, and wider Hawke's bay. This was the third National State of Emergency in New Zealand's history. The National Emergency Management Agency deployed 60 Starlink Internet devices while the Royal New Zealand Navy dispatched HMNZS Canterbury with supplies and equipment to build temporary bridges. On 17 February, Australia sent a team of 25 impact assessment experts to aid with disaster relief in New Zealand at the request of the New Zealand Government. The Royal Australian Air Force deployed a C-130 Hercules as part of the international relief effort. The New Zealand Government accepted an offer of help from Fiji. It took until 14 June before all state highways in the Hawke's Bay and Gisborne regions were reopened.

On 23 February, the New Zealand Police said they had conducted 507 prevention activities in the North Island's Eastern District on 22 February including reassurance patrols. During that time, they received 597 calls from the public including six burglary reports, 11 unlawful takings, and 38 family harm incidents. Police said they had arrested 59 people (42 in Hawke's Bay and 17 in Gisborne) for various offences including car conversion, serious assaults, burglary, and disorder. The police deployed 145 additional staff and an Eagle helicopter to the Eastern District.

==== Government ====
Transpower declared a grid emergency on 14 February after Hawke's Bay and Gisborne District lost phone coverage, internet coverage, and electricity. In addition to the states of emergency in place in Auckland, Northland, and Thames-Coromandel, regional states of emergency were declared in Gisborne District, the Bay of Plenty, and Waikato Region on 13 February, with local states of emergency being declared in the Waikato, Hauraki, Whakatāne, and Ōpōtiki Districts. A regional state of emergency was declared in Hawke's Bay on 14 February, with local states of emergency being declared in the Napier, Hastings, and Tararua Districts, before a national state of emergency was declared for only the third time in New Zealand's history later in the day. On 27 February, the state of emergency for Bay of Plenty was lifted while others were renewed for another 7 days. Sittings of the House of Representatives were adjourned for a week. The 2023 New Zealand census was not postponed, but field collectors worked for an extra 8 weeks in the cyclone affected areas in order to reach more people.

Prime Minister Hipkins announced on 13 February that the Government would provide NZ$11.5 million to support the community response to the cyclone. After the cyclone, the Government allocated a further NZ$50 million to support businesses and the primary sector, while NZ$250 million was allocated to assessing and fixing roads. On 14 May, the New Zealand Government allocated NZ$941 million from the 2023 New Zealand budget to address flood and cyclone damage caused by the 2023 Auckland Anniversary Weekend floods and Cyclone Gabrielle in the North Island. Of this amount, NZ$275 million would be allocated to Waka Kotahi and local councils to repairing damaged roads, NZ$200 million to repairing railways, NZ$117 million to repairing damaged schools, and NZ$35 million to covering various health services including mental health, general practitioners and frontline health workers. The New Zealand Treasury estimated that the total damage from Cyclone Gabrielle and the Auckland floods would cost between NZ$9 billion to $14.5 billion; with NZ$5 to $7.5 billion being related to infrastructure owned by central and local government. A special Lotto draw was held on March 18 with 50% of receipts, or $11.77 million, going to cyclone relief.

On 3 October, Forestry Ministry Peeni Henare announced that the Government would tighten forestry slash practices to reduce the risk of damage to downstream communities in response to Cyclone Gabrielle. Under the new regulations, slash longer than two metres, with a large-end diameter over 10 cm, must be removed after harvesting from erosion-prone land unless it is unsafe to remove it.

On 11 February 2024, Prime Minister Christopher Luxon and Emergency Management and Recovery Minister Mark Mitchell announced that the Government would contribute NZ$63 million to aid the removal of sediment and debris caused by Cyclone Gabrielle in the Hawke's Bay and Gisborne District.

==== Civil society ====
In early March 2023, Destiny Church leader Brian Tamaki blamed pornography, abortion, and gay rights for causing Cyclone Gabrielle during an hour long sermon based on the Old Testament Book of Leviticus. He also claimed that Gisborne and Hastings had the highest number of pornography consumers in New Zealand. Tamaki's remarks were condemned by Mayor of Gisborne Rehette Stoltz, who described them as "disappointing, unhelpful and laughable" during a time when members of the community had lost their homes and livelihoods.

In early October, Radio New Zealand reported that local organiser Lauren Treagus had organised the donation of plants to flood-hit households and gardens in Hawke's Bay.

==== Inquiries ====
On 23 February 2023, the New Zealand Government ordered a ministerial inquiry into forestry companies' slash practices, which had exacerbated flood damage caused by Cyclone Gabrielle. The forestry industry's practice of stockpiling of discarded branches and "offcuts" had damaged buildings and land during the flooding. The inquiry will be led by former National Party cabinet minister Hekia Parata, former Hawke's Bay Regional Council chief executive Bill Bayfield, and forestry engineer Matthew McCloy. Several political and civil society leaders including National Party leader Luxon, the Forest Owners Association President Don Carson, Green Party co-leader Shaw and fellow Green MP Eugenie Sage, and Forestry Minister Stuart Nash supported calls for an inquiry into the forestry industry's practices and accountability for flood damage from forestry companies.

On 23 April 2024, the NZ Government released the final report of the Government inquiry into the response to Cyclone Gabrielle and other severe weather events in the North Island in 2023. The report concluded that the national emergency management system was unfit for purpose, there was a major disconnect between local communities and civil defence emergency management (CDEM) agencies, that the emergency management system needed reform to deal with more frequent severe weather events and that more input with local communities, Māori people, territorial authorities was needed. On 24 July, an independent review by Phil Mitchell, Kyle Christensen and Bernadette Roka Arapere criticised the Hawke's Bay Regional Council's response to Cyclone Gabrielle, identifying major failings in its ability to plan and respond to extreme weather events.

In late-June 2025, a coroner's inquest into 18 weather-related fatalities during the 2023 Auckland Anniversary Weekend floods and Cyclone Gabrielle commenced in Auckland. The inquest was led by Coroner Erin Woolly and ran for six weeks, with the first phase taking place in Auckland between late June and August 2025, and the second phase taking place in Hastings between October and November 2025. By mid-August 2025, the first phase of the coroner's inquest was scrutinising the emergency response and subsequently heard evidence relating to the deaths of two firefighters in Muriwai during Cyclone Gabrielle.

The second phase of the coroner's inquest into 13 deaths in Hawke's Bay during Cyclone Gabrielle commenced in Hastings on 9 October 2025. The inquest was headed by Coroner Woolley and heard from 33 witnesses over a period of two weeks including former Hawke's Bay Civil Defence group controller Ian Macdonald, regional flood schemes operational manager Chris Dolley, and representatives from MetService, Fire and Emergency New Zealand, and the New Zealand Police. On 17 October, Macdonald told the inquiry that New Zealand had no centralised information platform for emergencies despite the 2011 Christchurch earthquake, which hampered the emergency response to Cyclone Gabrielle in the Hawke's Bay.

On 14 February 2026, the coroner's inquiry resumed in Hastings, with the coroner expected to hear from 40 witnesses including local authorities, police and relatives of the deceased. On 23 and 24 February, the coroner's inquiry heard testimony from residents of Muriwai in Auckland including the colleagues and relatives of the deceased Auckland firefighters Dave van Zwanenberg and Craig Stevens.

==== Managed retreat ====
Cyclone Gabrielle along with the 2023 Auckland Anniversary Weekend floods has renewed national discussion around managed retreat, the concept of moving people, assets and activities from dangerous locations. A range of figures and groups including the "West Auckland is Flooding" advocacy group, Victoria University of Wellington public policy emeritus professor Dr Jonathan Boston, former cabinet minister Phil Twyford, and University of Waikato environmental planning lecturer Dr Christina Hanna have advocated that the New Zealand Government and local councils encourage and subsidise residents and businesses to evacuate from flood-prone areas in New Zealand including West Auckland, Westport, South Dunedin, Christchurch's Southshore suburb, Lower Hutt's Petone suburb, and parts of Whakatāne, Whanganui or Whangārei. In February 2023, Prime Minister Hipkins and Climate Change Minister James Shaw confirmed that the Government was incorporating managed retreat into its Climate Change Adaptation Bill and disaster response policies.

On 1 June, affected properties across the Hawke's Bay region were grouped into three categories in order to clarify the impact of managed retreat. Around 10,000 were placed under category 2, meaning they would need extra flood protections in order to be rebuilt, while around 700 properties were placed under category 3, meaning they would be unsafe to rebuild. Most of the Esk Valley was placed under category 3. Voluntary buyouts were offered to impacted residents.

On 31 July, Cyclone Recovery Minister Grant Robertson proposed a cyclone recovery cost-sharing agreement with the Hawke's Bay Regional Council, Napier City Council, Hastings District Council, Wairoa District Council and Central Hawke's Bay District. This plan includes voluntary category 3 property buyouts, flood protection, and transport infrastructure repairs. In response, the five local councils confirmed that they would consider the Government's cost-sharing offer through a series of extraordinary meetings. On 3 August, the five councils voted to accept the Government's NZ$556 million recovery cost-sharing package, which will be split on a 50/50 basis between the Government and councils. The package consists of NZ$92.5 million for category 3 property buyouts in Hawke's Bay, NZ$203.5 million towards flood protection for category 2 areas between Wairoa and Pōrangahau, and NZ$260 million for repairing roads and bridges. The Human Rights Commission's Chief Commissioner Paul Hunt expressed concern about the lack of local input in the Government's cyclone recovery cost-sharing agreement.

== Retirement ==
Due to the severe damage caused by the storm in New Zealand, the name Gabrielle was retired from the list of Australian region cyclone names and will never be used to name a storm in that basin again. It was replaced by Gemm for future seasons.

== See also ==
- Tropical cyclones in 2023
- Weather of 2023
- List of natural disasters in New Zealand
- List of disasters in New Zealand by death toll
- 2023 Auckland Anniversary Weekend floods
- Cyclone Bola (1988)
- Cyclone Ita (2014)
- Cyclone Dovi (2022)
