= Mary Elizabeth Grenside Hewett =

School principal, editor

Mary Elizabeth Grenside Hewett (24 May 1857 – 8 April 1892) was a British-born New Zealand school principal.

She was born on 24 May 1857 at Thringstone, Leicestershire, where her father Reverend John Hewitt was the parson.

She had teaching qualifications from Queen's College, London, and had graduated from Newnham College, Cambridge.

She was first Acting Head at Otago Girls' High School in Dunedin, and then from 1883 was the founding Lady Principal of Napier Girls’ High School, where she championed scientific studies alongside the more traditional arts-based education.

She died of heart disease and tuberculosis on 8 April 1892 and was buried at sea off Napier.
