= Pūtōrino, New Zealand =

Pūtōrino Pūtōrino
- Rural settlement
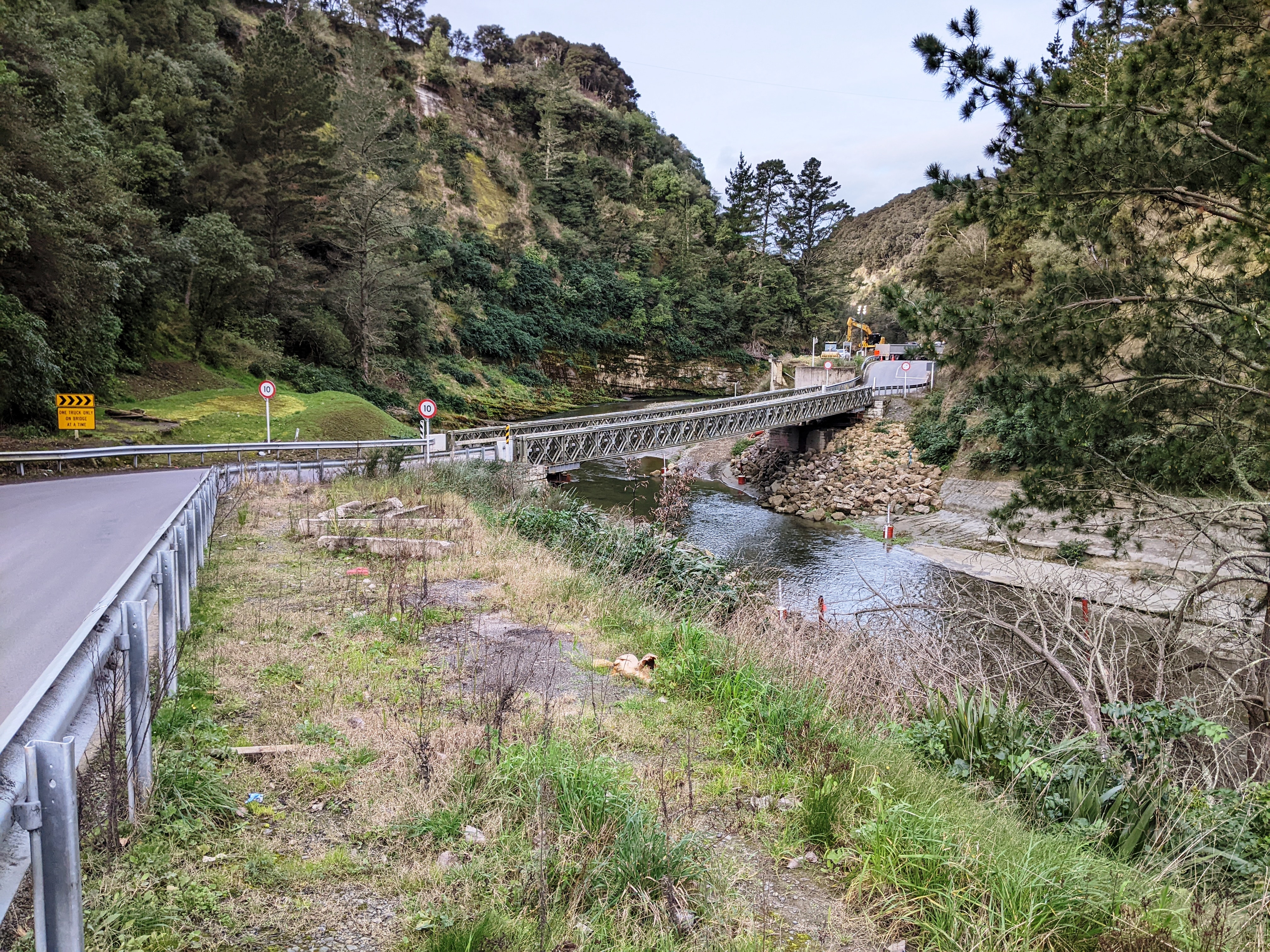
- The Bailey bridge spanning the Waikari River from 2023 to 2025
- Interactive map of Pūtōrino
- Coordinates: 39°08′S 177°00′E
- Country: New Zealand
- Region: Hawke's Bay
- Territorial authority: Hastings District
- Ward: Mohaka General Ward; Takitimu Māori Ward
- Community: Hastings District Rural Community
- Subdivision: Tūtira subdivision
- Electorates: Napier; Ikaroa-Rāwhiti (Māori)

Government
  - Territorial Authority: Hastings District Council
  - Mayor of Hastings: Wendy Schollum
  - Napier MP: Katie Nimon
  - Ikaroa-Rāwhiti MP: Cushla Tangaere-Manuel

Area
  - Total: 124.21 km^{2} (47.96 sq mi)

Population (2023 Census)
  - Total: 78
  - Density: 0.63/km^{2} (1.6/sq mi)

Pūtōrino is a small farming settlement in northern Hawke's Bay, on the eastern side of New Zealand's North Island. It is located on State Highway 2 between Tutira and Mohaka, on the Hastings side of the border between Hastings and Wairoa.

Pūtōrino was originally a Māori settlement at the mouth of the Waikari River, at an important stopping point for canoes. It became a European settlement in the 1860s, and moved inland to the main Napier to Wairoa Road in the early 20th century. The modern village includes a hotel and sports centre.

Flooding during Cyclone Gabrielle destroyed the State Highway 2 (SH2) bridge over the river at Pūtōrino. It was replaced by a Bailey bridge. In August-September 2025, the Bailey bridge was replaced by a wider and stronger Acrow bridge.

== Name ==
The settlement was originally named Waikari, meaning to dig for water. It was later renamed Pūtōrino after a local farm station, a name referring to a traditional Māori musical instrument.

== Demographics ==
Historical population
Year	Pop.	±% p.a.
2006	99	—
2013	99	+0.00%
2018	78	−4.66%
2023	78	+0.00%

Pūtōrino and its surrounds cover 124.21 km^{2} (47.96 sq mi). It is part of the Puketitiri-Tutira statistical area.

Pūtōrino had a population of 78 in the 2023 New Zealand census, unchanged since the 2018 census, and a decrease of 21 people (−21.2%) since the 2013 census. There were 42 males and 36 females in 30 dwellings. The median age was 39.2 years (compared with 38.1 years nationally). There were 12 people (15.4%) aged under 15 years, 15 (19.2%) aged 15 to 29, 42 (53.8%) aged 30 to 64, and 12 (15.4%) aged 65 or older.

People could identify as more than one ethnicity. The results were 96.2% European (Pākehā), and 19.2% Māori. English was the only language spoken. The percentage of people born overseas was 7.7, compared with 28.8% nationally.

The only religious affiliation given was 23.1% Christian. People who answered that they had no religion were 69.2%, and 7.7% of people did not answer the census question.

Of those at least 15 years old, 9 (13.6%) people had a bachelor's or higher degree, 36 (54.5%) had a post-high school certificate or diploma, and 18 (27.3%) people exclusively held high school qualifications. The median income was $35,200, compared with $41,500 nationally. The employment status of those at least 15 was 36 (54.5%) full-time and 15 (22.7%) part-time.

== Education ==
Putorino School is a co-educational state primary school serving Years 1 to 8, with a roll of 19 as of July 2026. It opened in 1916.
