= Rissington, Hawke's Bay =

Rissington
- Settlement
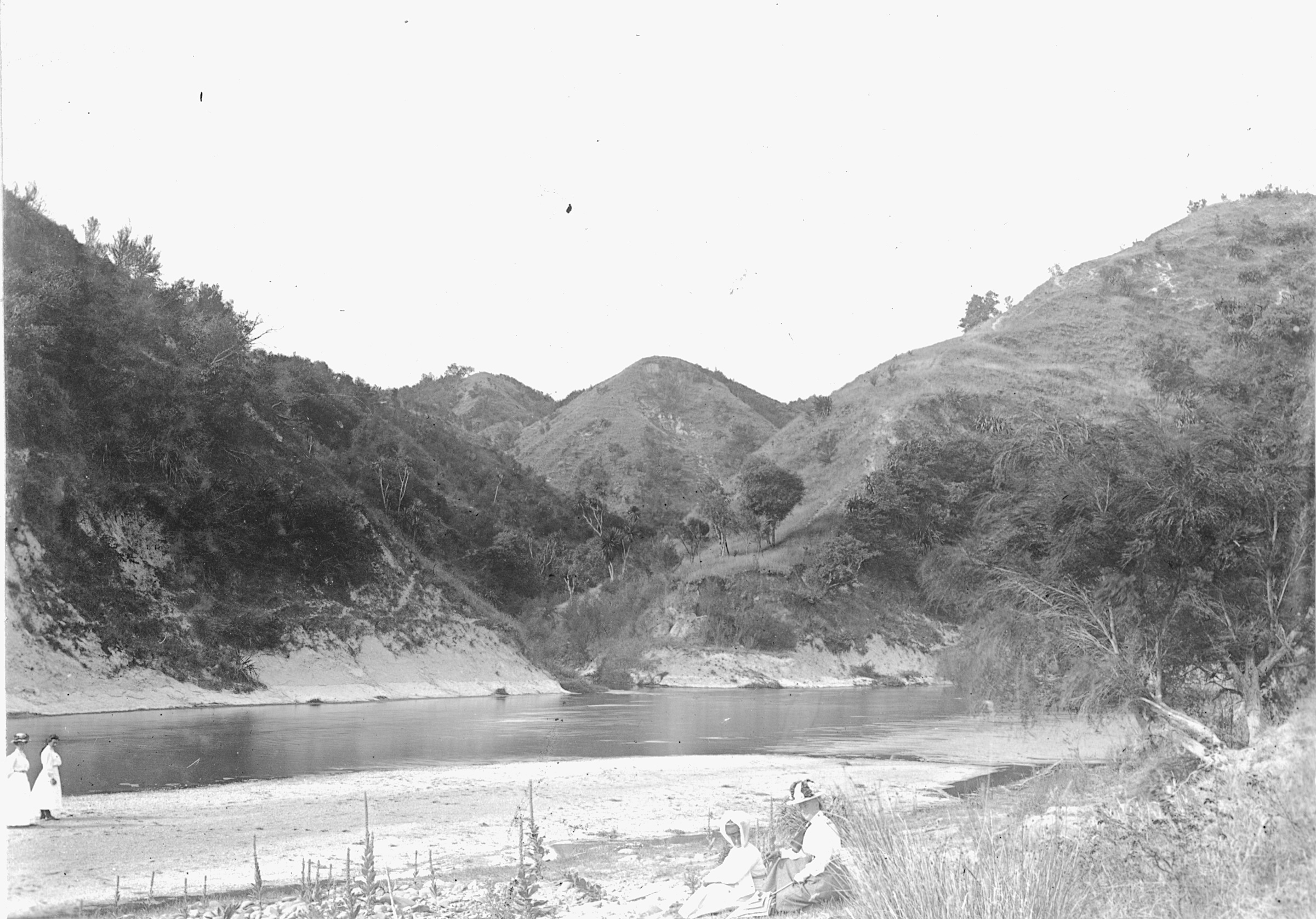
- River at Rissington about 1909
- Interactive map of Rissington
- Coordinates: 39.42544°S 176.71020°E
- Country: New Zealand
- Region: Hawke's Bay Region
- Territorial authority: Hastings District
- Ward: Mohaka General Ward; Takitimu Māori Ward
- Community: Hastings District Rural Community
- Subdivision: Kaweka subdivision
- Electorates: Napier; Ikaroa-Rāwhiti (Māori)

Government
  - Territorial Authority: Hastings District Council
  - Mayor of Hastings: Wendy Schollum
  - Napier MP: Katie Nimon
  - Ikaroa-Rāwhiti MP: Cushla Tangaere-Manuel

Area
  - Total: 87.96 km^{2} (33.96 sq mi)

Population (2023 Census)
  - Total: 198
  - Density: 2.25/km^{2} (5.83/sq mi)
- Postcode(s): 4184

Rissington is a farming settlement 15 km (9.3 mi) north west of Napier, New Zealand. It lies in Hawke's Bay Region, between Sherenden and Napier, in the Mangaone River valley, on the road to Patoka and Puketitiri. A fire station, cemetery (beside the river bridge) and a war memorial are the only remaining public structures, but it once had several more and was home to the country's first Women's Institute, co-founded by Amy Hutchinson and Bessie Spencer.

== History ==
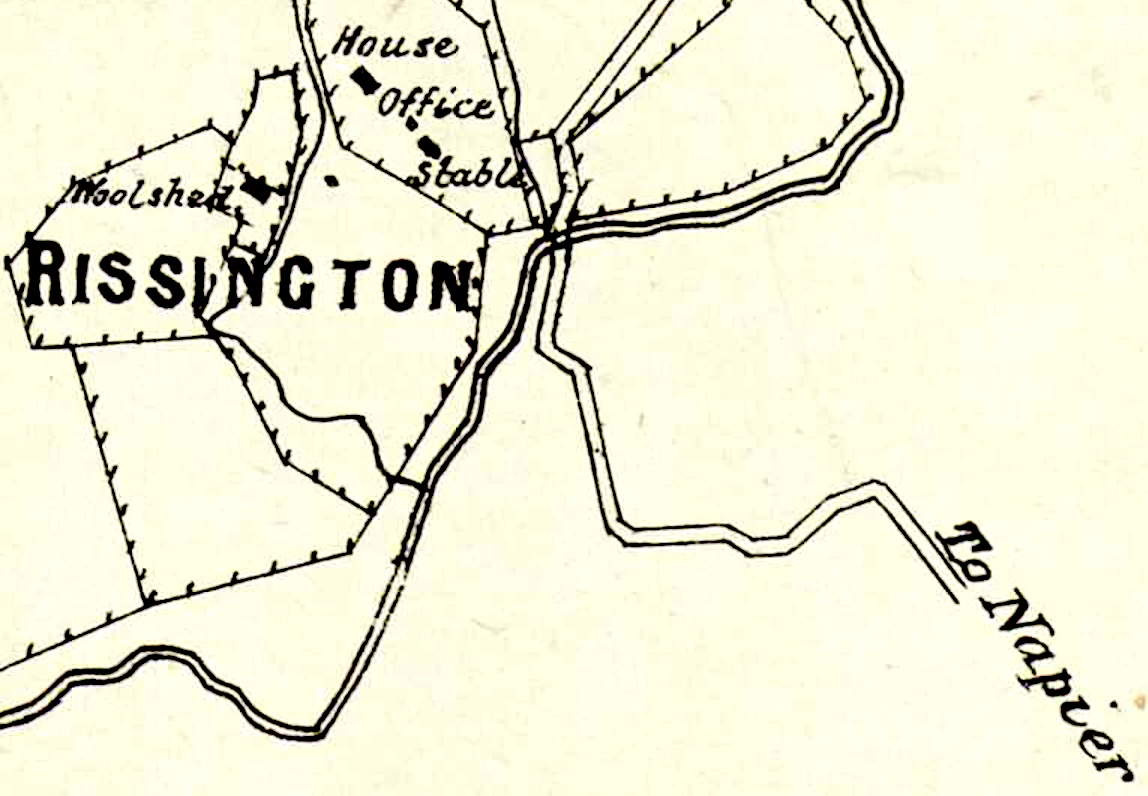
1882 map of Rissington

In November 1851, the Crown purchased the Ahuriri block for £1,500, described in 1855 as, "a million of acres at Ahuriri for a penny-three-farthings" an acre. However, the land around the Mangaone wasn't surveyed until 1861, when most of it was still under dense bush. There were reports of totara being floated down the river from the 1860s and two timber mills were still running in 1916. From 1861 the cleared land was used for large sheep stations, which were gradually split into smaller farms. Roads and other facilities spread, until cars and roads improved to put Rissington within a half hour journey from Napier, after which the area lost its post office, store, library hall and school.

=== Rissington Station ===
In September 1861 Major George Stoddart Whitmore took 2,600 acres (1,100 ha) in the Mangaone valley, initially as a Crown grant for his military service, in partnership with another soldier, Captain John McNeill. Whitmore reached Napier from Auckland on 21 December 1861. He was on the committee of Hawke's Bay Acclimatisation Society and, shortly after his arrival, introduced rabbits, brown quail, blackberry, and gorse. He sold his army commission on 7 November 1862 to pay for improvements to the station, which he named Rissington, after Great Rissington, a village close to his family's Gloucestershire home. Whitmore added pastoral licences bought from several neighbours, until he had about 110,000 acres (45,000 ha), stretching from the Kaweka Range, towards the coast. Ngāti Hineuru claimed to own some of the land. Local legend was that Whitmore repeatedly swindled his neighbours and partners. In retaliation for alleged stealing of his sheep, Whitmore, as commander of the Napier Military District Defence Force, attacked Pai Mārire at Omarunui in 1866, killing 21, or 23, wounding about 30 and taking 58 prisoners and went on to raid Ngāti Hineuru areas. Whitmore represented Wairoa on the Hawke's Bay Provincial Council from 10 April 1867 until 29 May 1869. In July and August 1868 he pursued Te Kooti inland from Poverty Bay and was promoted to colonel on 21 October 1868. He was defeated by Tītokowaru at Moturoa on 7 November, but took Te Kooti's stronghold of Ngātapa on 5 January 1869 with great slaughter. His last campaign was invasion of Te Urewera, from 4 to 18 May. Whitmore was eased out of his post in July 1869. He sold the station in 1872. It was divided into smaller farms in 1882, at which time it had about 1,000 cattle and 90,000 sheep.

=== Apley Station ===
15,000 acres (6,100 ha) of Rissington Station was sold in 1873 for £30,500 to William Buckland, who sold it for £37,300 in 1874. It was divided into three blocks in 1879 and further subdivided after 1929. Steam-driven shearing was introduced in Apley woolshed by 1908. Since 2001 Apley homestead has been on a 700 acres (280 ha) farm, between Rissington and Patoka. Apley homestead and woolshed were listed as Category 2 Historic Places on 7 April 1983.

=== School ===
Rissington School opened in 1904 and was extended in 1909. Due to the condition of the buildings it closed in 2010 and was demolished, or removed, in 2011, since when a bus has taken pupils to Patoka.

=== Scout camp ===
Weka Point, a 6.8 ha (17 acres) Scouting camp, opened in 1911, beside a bend in the Mangaone River. A suspension bridge links it to Puketitiri Road. In 2011 the Lions Club helped replace the bridge and two rooms were moved from the old school.

=== Library hall ===
Rissington Library Hall opened in 1907, or 1912 and closed in 2001, due to its poor condition and low use. It was demolished shortly after.

=== Post office ===
The post office was open by 1904. It burnt down in 1954.

=== Women's institute ===
Rissington had the first Women's Institute in the country, founded by Bessie Spencer, on 27 January 1921 at Omatua lodge. The lodge replaced the original Omatua Homestead built by Captain Anderson in 1861, damaged in the 1863 earthquake. It was given to the Girl Guides Association in 1961, further property was bought in 1964 and Omatua was rebuilt in 1979.

=== Soldiers Settlement ===
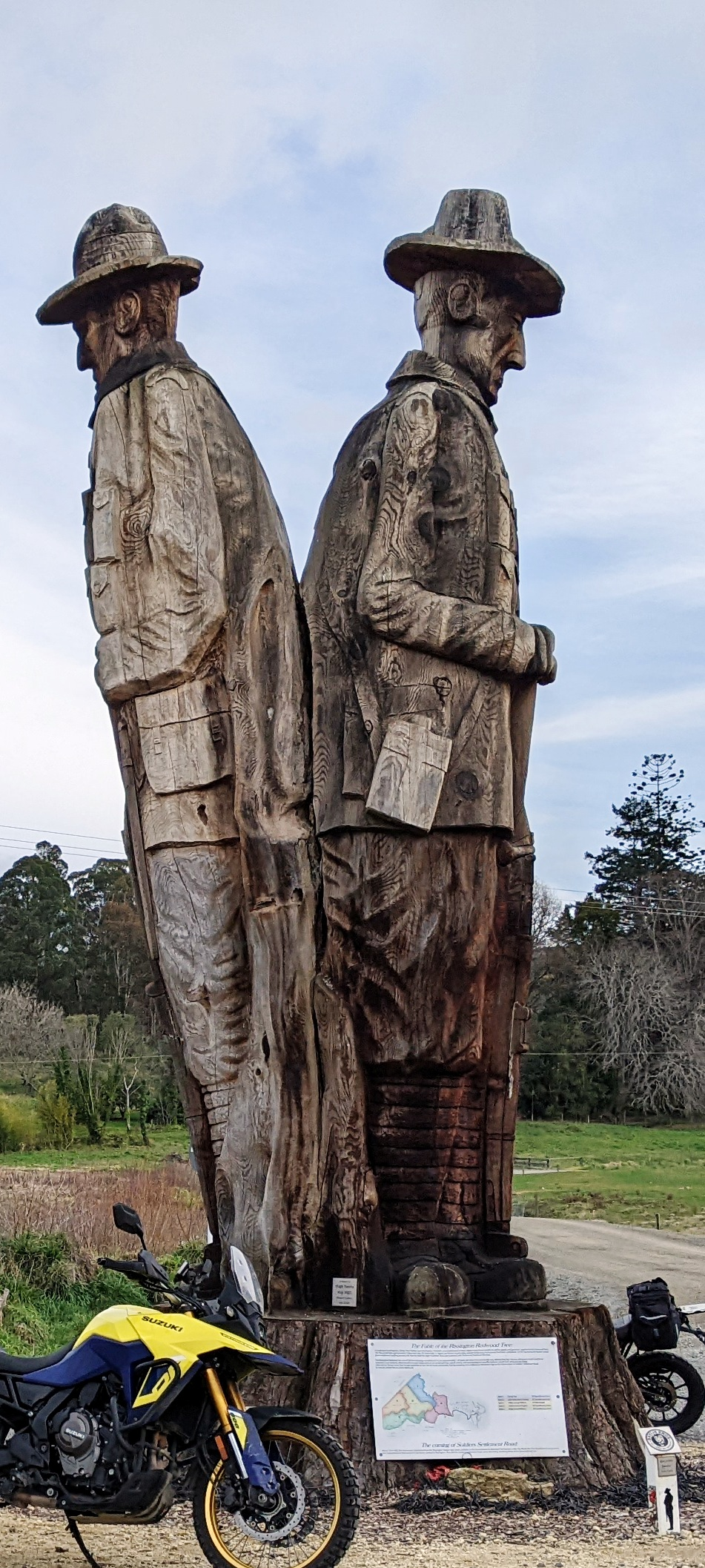
ANZAC memorial on Soldiers Settlement Road carved from a redwood tree

In the 1920s a Soldiers Settlement was created to settle World War 1 veterans as sheep farmers, under the Discharged Soldiers Settlement Act 1915, Soldiers Settlement Road being built in 1926.

== Demographics ==
Rissington and its surrounds cover 87.96 km^{2} (33.96 sq mi). It is part of the Puketitiri-Tutira statistical area.

Historical population
Year	Pop.	±% p.a.
2006	192	—
2013	180	−0.92%
2018	195	+1.61%
2023	198	+0.31%

Rissington had a population of 198 in the 2023 New Zealand census, an increase of 3 people (1.5%) since the 2018 census, and an increase of 18 people (10.0%) since the 2013 census. There were 108 males, 90 females, and 3 people of other genders in 66 dwellings. 1.5% of people identified as LGBTIQ+. The median age was 44.2 years (compared with 38.1 years nationally). There were 33 people (16.7%) aged under 15 years, 33 (16.7%) aged 15 to 29, 99 (50.0%) aged 30 to 64, and 30 (15.2%) aged 65 or older.

People could identify as more than one ethnicity. The results were 92.4% European (Pākehā), 15.2% Māori, and 6.1% other, which includes people giving their ethnicity as "New Zealander". English was spoken by 98.5%, Māori by 1.5%, and other languages by 1.5%. No language could be spoken by 1.5% (e.g. too young to talk). The percentage of people born overseas was 9.1, compared with 28.8% nationally.

Religious affiliations were 36.4% Christian, and 3.0% Māori religious beliefs. People who answered that they had no religion were 50.0%, and 7.6% of people did not answer the census question.

Of those at least 15 years old, 24 (14.5%) people had a bachelor's or higher degree, 108 (65.5%) had a post-high school certificate or diploma, and 33 (20.0%) people exclusively held high school qualifications. The median income was $33,600, compared with $41,500 nationally. 12 people (7.3%) earned over $100,000 compared to 12.1% nationally. The employment status of those at least 15 was 81 (49.1%) full-time, 30 (18.2%) part-time, and 6 (3.6%) unemployed.

== Transport ==
A cartage service began in 1884. In 1885 a bridge over the Mangaone was built by James Sellar to replace a ford. By 1886 the Rissington-Pakowhai road was being gravelled, in 1887 the Taradale-Rissington-Patoka road was built and by 1890 the whole Rissington-Napier road had been gravelled. A coach service from Napier began in 1888. By 1893 it had been extended to Puketitiri and was still running in 1916.

The 140 ft (43 m) bridge was swept away by floods in 1897 and 1924 and rebuilt in 1929. Nearby properties were flooded in 2018, but the bridge wasn't damaged. It was strengthened in 2021 to take 62-tonne trucks, up to 4.9 m (16 ft) high, to comply with the Vehicle Dimensions and Mass 2016 rule. The bridge was again destroyed in February 2023 due to flooding caused by Cyclone Gabrielle. It was replaced by a 43 m (141 ft) long Bailey bridge on 31 March 2023.
