= Napier Girls' High School =

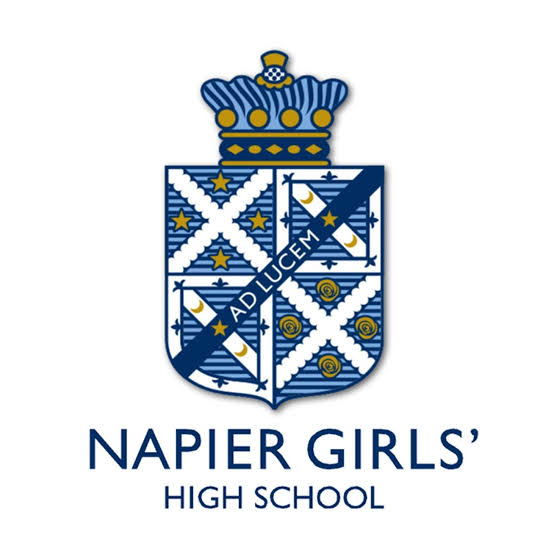

Location
- Clyde Road; Napier 4110; New Zealand; 39.4857°S 176.9145°E

Information
- Type: State, Girls, Secondary with boarding facilities
- Motto: Ad Lucem "Towards the Light" "Ki Te Marama"
- Established: 1884
- Ministry of Education Institution no.: 217
- Principal: Dawn Ackroyd
- Enrolment: 1,028 (July 2026)
- Socio-economic decile: 6N
- Website: www.nghs.school.nz

Napier Girls' High School is a state secondary school on Clyde Road, Napier, New Zealand. It is one of the oldest schools in New Zealand for girls, and has a current school roll of about 1000.

== History ==
In July 1883 plans were submitted to the board of governors for a school for girls in Napier, and the following month the board advertised for a lady principal who would be required to teach English, Latin, French and mathematics and take charge of the boarding establishment. Mary Hewett was appointed, and the school opened on 29 January 1884. The original school course included English, French, Latin, German, drawing, singing and calisthenics. 39 pupils were on the books that first day, and one boarder was enrolled.

The original school building had classrooms on the ground floor, and rooms for the boarders upstairs. It stood where the main hostel building, Hewett House, now stands. It was badly damaged in the 1931 Hawke's Bay earthquake, and had to be demolished. The main building of the present school, named Spencer Building after A.E.J. Spencer, the school's third principal, stands in what was the original playing area of the first school. After bad damage, Napier Technical College was disestablished by the minister of education and was amalgamated into Napier Girls' High School and Napier Boys' High School.

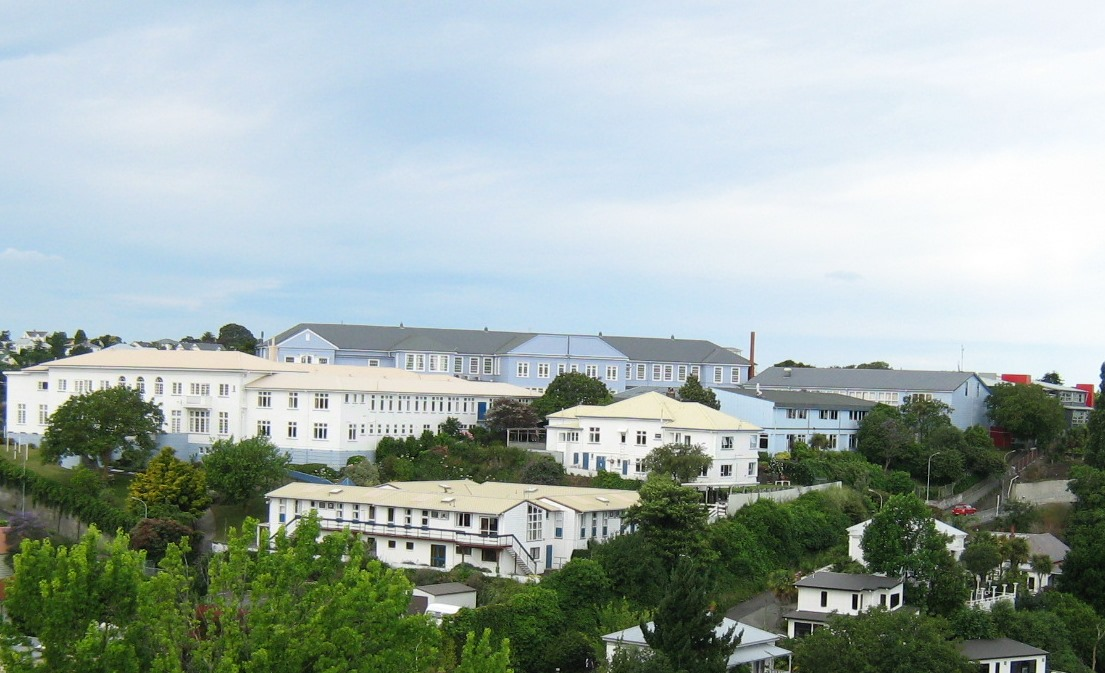
Napier Girls' High School buildings.

The entrance to the school hall features a large mural painting by renowned New Zealand artist, Rita Angus.

Hewett House provides boarding accommodation for 160 boarders adjacent to the school, including five day and seven day stay. The girls are housed in double cubicles or dormitories, and some have single rooms. Matthews House accommodation opened in 1988, and contains single cubicles for senior girls.

== Enrolment ==
As of July 2026, Napier Girls' High School has a roll of 1,028 students, of which 291 (28.3%) identify as Māori.

As of 2026, Napier Girls' High School has an Equity Index of 448, placing it amongst schools whose students have below average socioeconomic barriers to achievement (roughly equivalent to deciles 6 and 7 under the former socio-economic decile system).

== Notable alumnae ==
- Mandy Boyd (1991–), lawn bowls player
- Helen Margaret Druce (1921–2010), teacher, tramper and botanist
- Amy Hutchinson (1874–1971), school hostel matron, spinner and weaver, community leader.
- Aliesha Staples, digital technology entrepreneur
- Jacquie Sturm (1927–2009), poet and writer of short stories
- Emma Twigg (1987–), rower

== Notable faculty ==
- Katherine Browning (1864–1946), former mathematics teacher and notable published scientist
- June Clifford (retired 2008), former head of music and chair of Chamber Music New Zealand
