= Dartmoor, New Zealand =

Dartmoor
- Locality
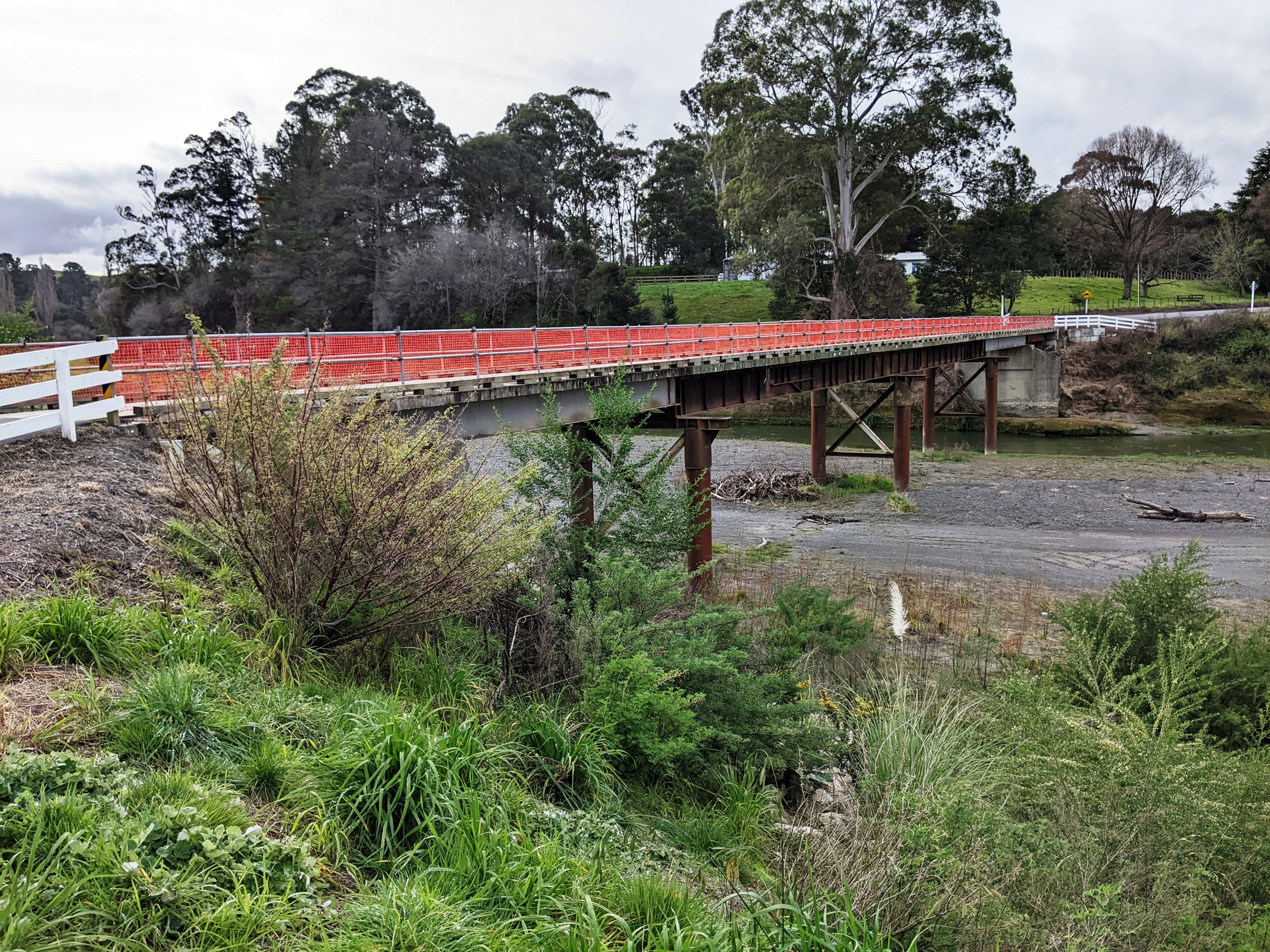
- Dartmoor Bridge over Mangaone River
- Interactive map of Dartmoor
- Coordinates: 39°28′49″S 176°41′35″E
- Country: New Zealand
- Region: Hawke's Bay Region
- Territorial authority: Hastings District
- Electorates: Napier; Ikaroa-Rāwhiti (Māori)

Government
  - Territorial Authority: Hastings District Council
  - Mayor of Hastings: Wendy Schollum
  - Napier MP: Katie Nimon
  - Ikaroa-Rāwhiti MP: Cushla Tangaere-Manuel
- Postcode(s): 4186

Dartmoor is a rural community in the Hastings District and Hawke's Bay Region of New Zealand's North Island. It is located west of Napier on the northern bank of the Tūtaekurī River.

In February 2023, Dartmoor was severely affected by flooding from Cyclone Gabrielle. Water from the Tutaekuri River rose above homes and damaged much of the agricultural land.

== Demographics ==
Dartmoor is within the Puketitiri-Tutira statistical area.
