= Waikari River (Hawke's Bay) =

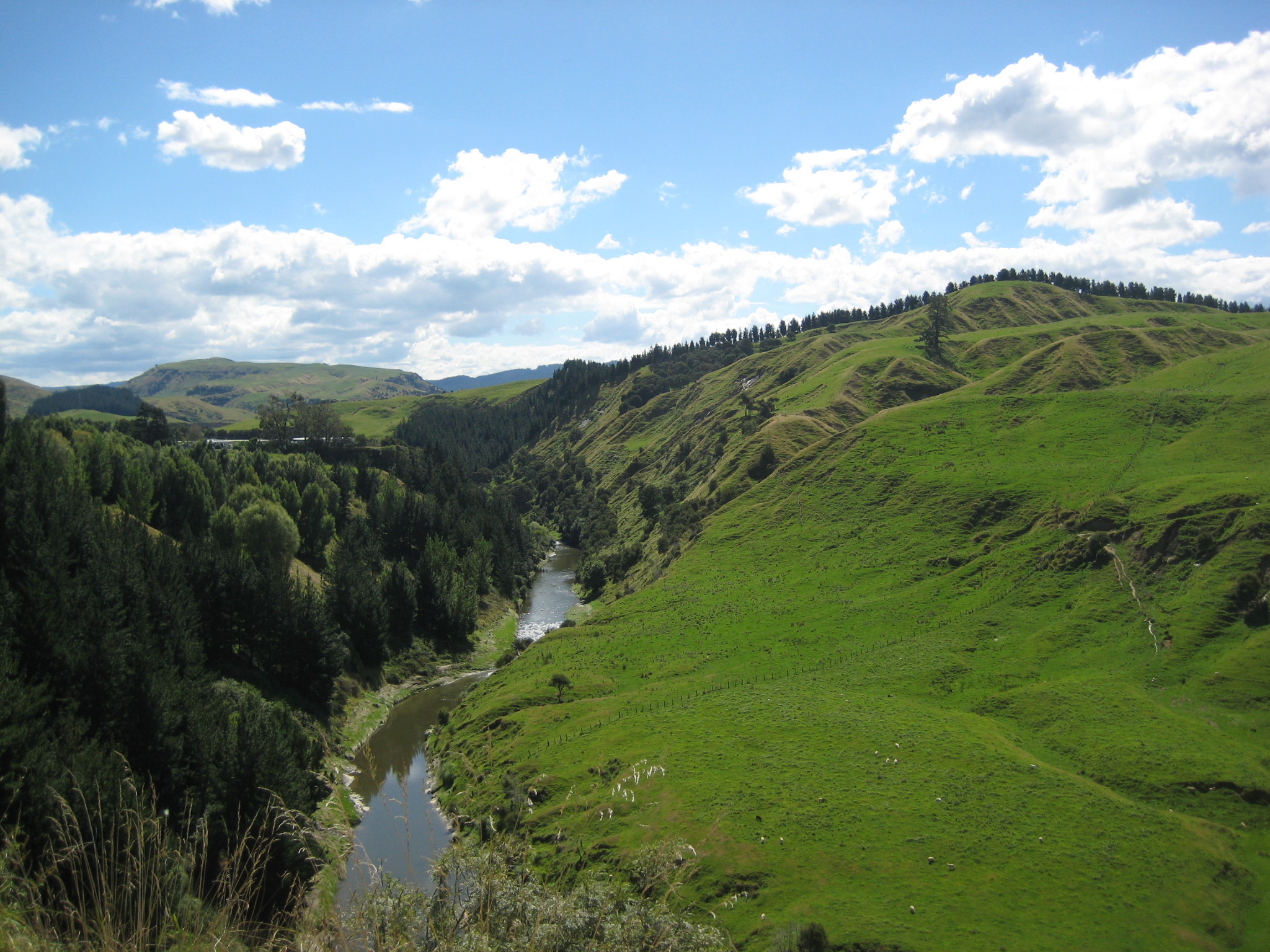
- Waikari River near Pūtōrino
- Route of the Waikari River
- Mouth of the Waikari River Waikari River (Hawke's Bay) (North Island)
- Etymology: Māori meaning "dig for water"
- Native name: Waikari (Māori)

Location
- Country: New Zealand
- Island: North Island
- Region: Hawke's Bay
- District: Hastings, Wairoa

Physical characteristics
- Source: Confluence of the Boundary Stream and Korongomairoa Stream
  - coordinates: 39.09244°S 176.87800°E
- Mouth: Hawke Bay
  - coordinates: 39°10′11″S 177°05′11″E
  - elevation: 0 m (0 ft)
- Length: 49 km (30 mi)

Basin features
- Progression: Waikari River → Hawke Bay → Pacific Ocean
- Tributaries
  - left: Mangapapapapa Stream, Boundary Stream, Anaura Stream, Tūtaenui Stream
  - right: Māori Stream, Mangangārara Stream, Pohatanui Stream, Matahorua Stream, Pouarua Stream, Te Kuta Stream, Mangamemiha Stream
- Bridges: Waikari Viaduct, Waikare Gorge Bailey Bridge

The Waikari River is a river in the Hawke's Bay region of New Zealand's North Island. It flows generally east from its source at the confluence of the Boundary Stream and Korongomairoa Stream, both of which originate at the northern end of the Maungaharuru Range, before passing the settlement of Pūtōrino to reach Hawke Bay 25 km (16 mi) southwest of Wairoa. The name Waikari comes from the Māori words wai meaning "water" and kari meaning "dig". The river was called Waikare until given an official name in 1941.

== Geography ==
Much of the Waikari River forms the border between the Hastings District and Wairoa District.

== History ==
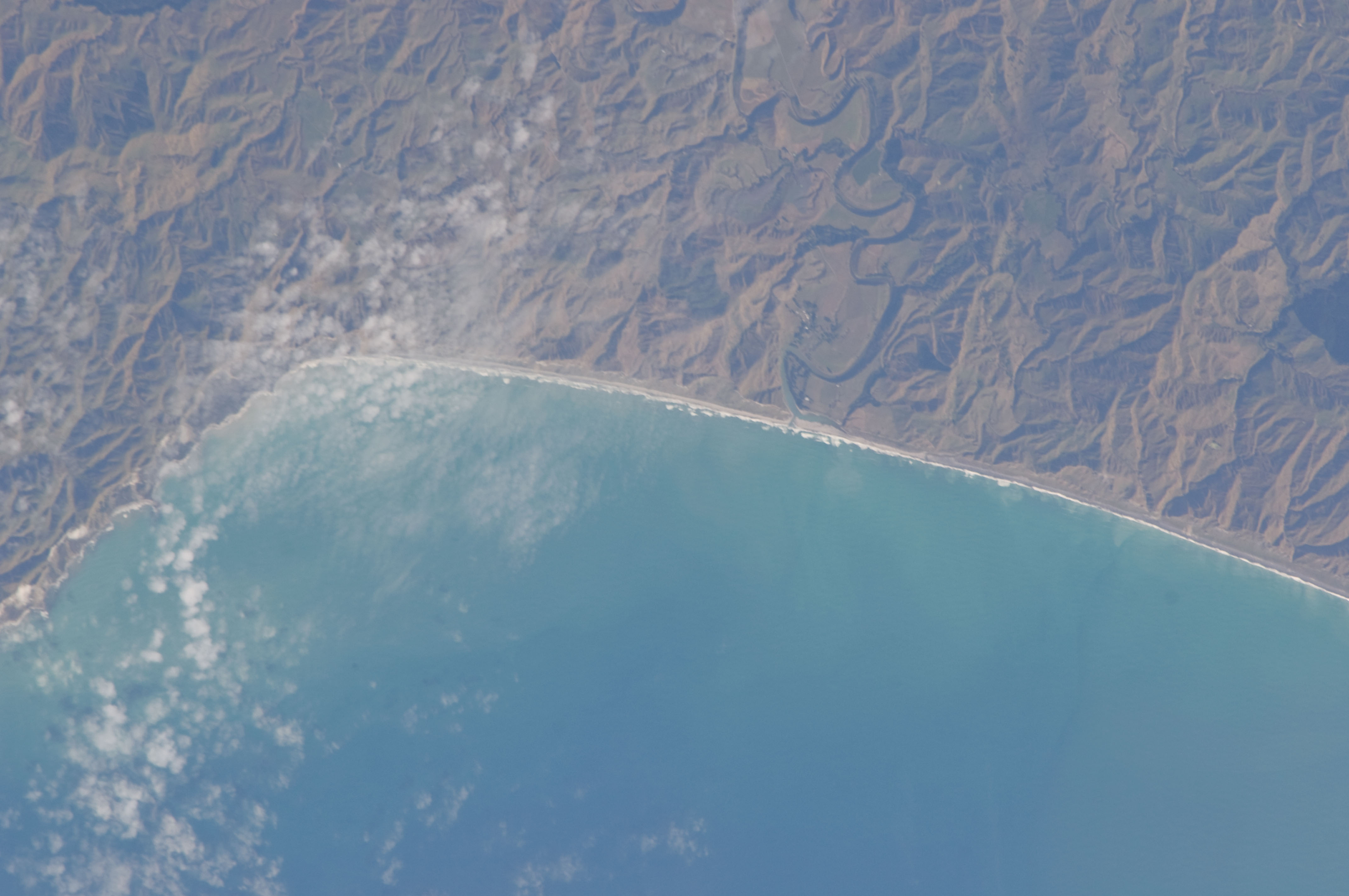
Sinuous lower reaches of the Waikari River at centre, viewed from space

In the 1931 earthquake a tsunami hit the river mouth, leaving fish up to 15 m (49 ft) above the high tide level.

Flooding of the river on 14 February 2023 during Cyclone Gabrielle destroyed the State Highway 2 bridge over the river at Pūtōrino and facilities at a Department of Conservation campsite beside the river about 200 m (660 ft) from the river mouth. A temporary Bailey bridge was erected to replace the highway bridge, opening on 14 May. A huge amount of logs and forest debris swept down by the cyclone still covered the river mouth and adjacent coastline in October 2023.

== See also ==
- List of rivers of New Zealand
