= Auckland Rugby Union =

New Zealand provincial rugby union

- Sport: Rugby union
- Jurisdiction: Auckland Region
- Abbreviation: ARU
- Founded: 1883; 143 years ago
- Affiliation: New Zealand Rugby
- Headquarters: Eden Park
- President: Bernie McCahill
- Chairman: Brent Metson
- CEO: Jarrod Bear
- Director: Andy Roberts; Chris Fairbairn; Lara McKittrick; Jason Chandler
- Sponsor: Barfoot & Thompson

Official website
- www.aucklandrugby.co.nz
- (New Zealand)

The Auckland Rugby Union is a New Zealand provincial rugby union. The union was established in 1883 and was originally responsible for the administration of the sport in most of the former Auckland Province, although its boundaries have since shrunk to include only a portion of the Auckland urban area. The union governs the Auckland representative team, which has won New Zealand's first-tier domestic provincial competition 17 times, more than any other team. Their most recent title was the 2018 Mitre 10 Cup Premiership. The union administers all club rugby within its boundaries, including the Gallaher Shield and other senior club rugby, as well as school rugby. Auckland also acts as a primary feeder to the Blues, who play in the Super Rugby competition.

== History ==
In September 1875 an Auckland team commenced the first organised rugby tour of New Zealand (or the Colony as it was known). At this time players from Thames and Waikato were also included in the team which played five matches between 18 and 28 September 1875 against representative teams from Wellington, Christchurch, Nelson and Picton and Taranaki. They lost all five matches.

In 1876 Canterbury were the first province to make a representative trip to Auckland where they played the match at Graham's Gardens, Ellerslie which Auckland won 7–3. A follow up match against Thames was also won by Auckland. In August 1877 an Otago team first visited Auckland and the match played at Ellerslie ended up a draw 0–0. In September 1880, the first Wellington team to visit Auckland resulted in a 4–0 win for them at the Auckland Domain. Auckland hosted a New South Wales team in September and October 1882, where Auckland won the two matches at the Auckland Domain.

=== Early years (1883–1899) ===
The Auckland Rugby Football Union (ARFU) or Auckland Rugby Union Football Association as it was then known was officially formed on 20 April 1883, in response to the need for a governing body to oversee rugby in Auckland. A preliminary meeting earlier in the year led to the drafting of rules and a constitution, which were finalised at a gathering at the United Service Hotel, Auckland. Mr. H. Croxton was elected President, with Mr. W. H. Gretton as Honorary Treasurer, alongside representatives from affiliated clubs. The Auckland, Grafton, North Shore and Ponsonby clubs belonged to the Association and any other clubs in the Auckland Provincial District could be admitted. The union joined the Canterbury, Wellington and Otago unions in the fledgling New Zealand Rugby Football Union.

The first representative match played by Auckland as a union was against Canterbury at Lancaster Park, Christchurch on 25 August 1883, with Auckland winning 4–1. This match was followed by a drawn match against Otago at the Caledonian Ground, Dunedin on 1 September 1883. A further match against Wellington at Newtown Park on 8 September 1883 resulted in a draw as well.

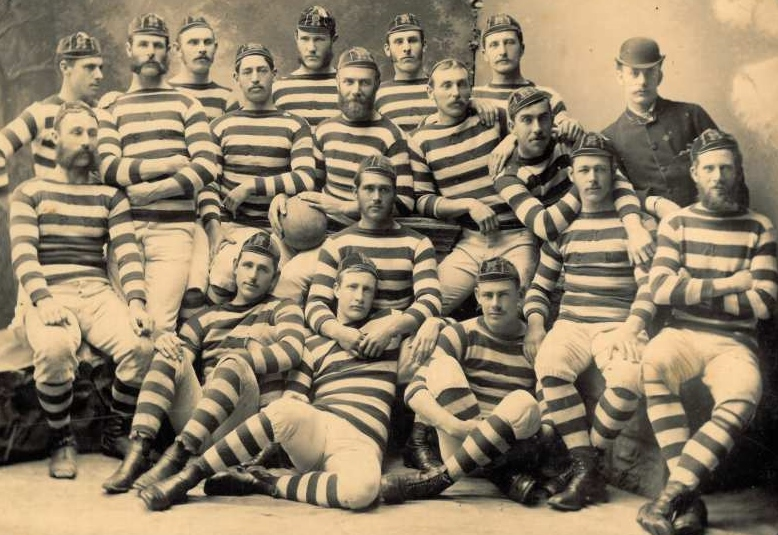
Auckland Rugby Union NZ Tour Team – 1883

On 25 April 1884, the first annual meeting was held and included the admittance of the Newton, Gordon and Albert clubs as 'senior clubs. There were no provincial fixtures until 1886 which included a match against Wellington in Auckland and a visit by the New South Wales team for three matches which were all won by Auckland.

In 1887, Auckland began playing their matches at Potters' Paddock which included their first match against Taranaki on 21 June which they lost. Auckland played further home matches against Canterbury (a draw) and Otago (a win).

Auckland has been the most successful union in New Zealand rugby history, having won a record 16 ITM Cup (and predecessor competition) titles. Auckland also holds the record for the most Ranfurly Shield wins (16), successful defences (148), and longest streak of successful defences (61). All Blacks statistics also reveal the extent of Auckland's influence: of the 1071 players to have worn the national jersey from 1888 to 2008, 133 were born in Auckland, compared to Christchurch (74), Wellington (60) and Dunedin (53).

In 1996, with the advent of professional rugby union, Auckland became the host, and primary feeder, to the Blues, known from 1996 to 1999 as the Auckland Blues.

=== Golden eras ===
Auckland went undefeated for six seasons from 1897, with victory over the British and Irish Lions in 1904. There was an undefeated run in the early 1920s under Sir Vincent Meredith. The 1960 to 1963 period, known as the Golden Era, was summed up in The Golden Years written by Don Cameron in 1983. Sir Wilson Whineray, who captained Auckland through those years and the All Blacks in 30 tests from 1957 to 1965, describes the period as one of "excitement, drama and fervor that transformed Eden Park into an oasis of magic during the winters of 1960, 1961, 1962 and 1963." The period from 1982 to 2007 is also regarded as a golden period, with Auckland winning more than half (16 out of 26 ) of all NPC titles and five South Pacific Championship titles during the era and winning the team of the year award at the 1992 Halberg Awards.

=== Ranfurly Shield years ===
Auckland were the first holders of the Ranfurly Shield in 1902 and have won 153 out of 194 shield matches – the most successful record of any provincial union. Notable periods include from 1905 to 1913, when they defeated 23 successive challenges, 1960 and 1963, when 25 challenges were defeated, 1985 to 1993, when a record 61 were defeated. Auckland most recently held the shield between 2007 and 2008, when 5 challenges were defeated. Players like Andy Haden, Sean Fitzpatrick, John Drake, Olo Brown, Zinzan and Robin Brooke, Gary and Alan Whetton, Michael Jones, Steve McDowall, Grant Fox, Bernie McCahill, Grant Dickson, Mark Carter, Joe Stanley, John Kirwan and Terry Wright were important in Auckland's success in that last period.

In 1993, Auckland defeated the British Lions by 23–18 during their tour to New Zealand.

With six titles in the 1990s and four in the 2000s, Auckland's domination of the New Zealand rugby landscape continued. The 2007 team was the first since the 1990 side to remain unbeaten in a season and win the Ranfurly Shield and the provincial championship. Players like Kees Meeuws, Keven Mealamu, Ali Williams, Justin Collins, Xavier Rush, Steve Devine, Brad Mika, Ben Atiga, Doug Howlett, Daniel Braid, Brent Ward and Angus Macdonald contributed to that success.

Auckland' fortunes collapsed when New Zealand Rugby moved to being a professional sport. It was 2018 before an Auckland side once again won the National Provincial Championship.

== Honours ==
- National Provincial Championship/Air New Zealand Cup/ITM Cup/Mitre 10 Cup (17):

1982, 1984, 1985, 1987, 1988, 1989, 1990, 1993, 1994, 1995, 1996, 1999, 2002, 2003, 2005, 2007, 2018

- South Pacific Championship/Super 6/Super 10 (4):

1987 (shared with Canterbury), 1988, 1989, 1990

- Ranfurly Shield

1902–04 (0), 1905–13 (23), 1934–35 (1), 1952 (0), 1959 (2), 1960–63 (25), 1965 (3), 1971 (1), 1972 (0), 1974–76 (10), 1979 (6), 1985–93 (61), 1995–96 (3), 1996–97 (6), 2003–04 (2), 2007–08 (5)

== Other representative teams ==
In addition to the Men's 1st XV, the ARU has a number of other representative teams for both men and women. Their women's team is known as the Auckland Storm.

== Club rugby ==
=== Affiliated clubs ===
The earliest senior foundation clubs in the union were Auckland (1871), North Shore (1873), Grafton (1874), Ponsonby (1874), Newton (1884), Gordon (1884), Albert (1884), College Rifles (1897), University (1888), Marist (1908), Grammar (1914) and Suburbs (1918).

- College Rifles RFC
- East Tamaki RFC
- Eden RFC
- Grammar TEC RC
- Manukau Rovers RFC
- Marist Brothers Old Boys RFC
- Mt Wellington RFC
- Otahuhu RFC
- Pakuranga United RC
- Papatoetoe RFC
- Ponsonby RFC
- Puketapapa Roskill RFC
- Roskill Districts RFC
- Suburbs RFC
- Te Papapa Onehunga RFC
- University RFC
- Waiheke RFC
- Waitakere City RFC
- Waitemata RFC

The following teams all field teams in the Auckland Rugby Union senior rugby competition in its various forms:

Club	Founded	Club Badge / Motto	Headquarters	Ground	Original Colours	Notes
Auckland	1871		Queen St.	Albert Barracks		
North Shore	1873	On the badge crest sits a golden springbok, positioned above a horizontal bar in green and white — colors associated with the club's official palette. Beneath the springbok, the intertwined gold initials '**NSRFC**' are displayed in an ornate script, accompanied by the year **1873**, which marks the club's founding. Below the initials is a banner with the club's motto, '**Eprouvez'**, meaning 'Test Yourselves' or 'Prove Yourselves', The badge includes a bold lower banner in gold with '**North Shore Rugby Club'** in capital black lettering, bordered by a green stripe.	Devonport	Devonport Domain, Devonport		North Harbour Rugby Union (1985–present)
Grafton	1874	Stylised image of a Magpie in traditional shield design	Edwin St, Mt Eden	various		Merged with **Cornwall** to become **Carlton** in 1982.
Ponsonby	1874	The badge has a distinctive heraldic design and at the centre of the double-line shield with gold and blue edging is a white seahorse crowned in gold. Behind the seahorse, the background consists of alternating black and blue diagonal stripes, representing the club's official colors: **blue and black.** Below the seahorse is a classic white rugby ball. A twisted rope motif in blue and gold separates the rugby ball and seahorse. The upper portion of the shield bears the club's name, '**Ponsonby Rugby'**, in gold block letters on a black background, while a scroll at the base displays the Latin motto '**In Hoc Signo Vinces'**, meaning 'In this sign, you will conquer'.	Blake St, Ponsonby Western Springs Stadium, Western Springs (1997 –present)	Cox's Bay Reserve, Westmere Western Springs Stadium, Western Springs (1997–present)		
Waitematā	1883					
Gordon	1884					
Albert	1884					
Newton	1884					
City	1891					
**College Rifles**	1897	The badge is built around a navy blue Maltese cross. At the center of the cross is a golden lion representing Auckland Grammar School standing on its hind legs set against a dark oval field framed by laurel branches. Above the lion is the year '**1897'**, denoting the club's founding date and three red stars representing St John's College, Remuera also accompany the lion. Encircling the central crest are gold scrolls bearing the club's Latin motto: '**Sodales Parati'**, meaning 'Comrades Prepared'. The club's name — **College Rifles Auckland** — is inscribed on the arms of the cross. Topping the badge is a stylised crown representing King's College, incorporating red crosses and black detailing.	Rutland St, Auckland Central (1910–1914)(drill hall) Grafton Rd, Grafton(1914–1924) Parnell (training shed)(1924–1930) Brewery Ground, Khyber Pass, Newmarket (1930–1939) College Rifles Park, Haast St, Remuera (1949–present)	Rutland St, Auckland Central (1910 – 1914 (drill hall) Parnell (training shed) (1924–1930) Brewery Ground, Khyber Pass, Newmarket (1930–1939) College Rifles Park, Haast St, Remuera (1949–present)		The club was founded to play in military matches and then from 1910 was affiliated with the Auckland Rugby Union.
**Auckland University**	1888	The club badge is the same as the arms for the University of Auckland but with the addition of **A.U.R.F.C** across the top in a white horizontal band and the badge is coloured only blue and white.	various prior to 1977 including Carlton Club Hotel, Newmarket and University of Auckland Colin Maiden Park, St Johns (1977–present)	Colin Maiden Park, St Johns (1977–present)		
**Marist Brothers Old Boys**	1908	The badge features a stylised shield divided diagonally by a series of bold red stripes that run from the upper left to the lower right, On the left side of the shield, the club's initials **M B O B** are prominently displayed in a stacked formation. The letters 'O' and 'B' are in red, while the central 'M' and 'B' is in blue. The two variations of blue represent the liturgical colours of the Virgin Mary and the red colour is for the Sacred Heart of Jesus Christ. In the upper right corner of the shield is a white monogram on a dark blue background consisting of a stylized 'AM' topped with a small crown of 12 stars (Mary's Monogram) which stands for the Latin, 'Ave Maria' Beneath the shield is a light blue banner edged in dark blue bearing the words '**RUGBY CLUB'.**		Liston Park, Ellerslie (1965–2011); Mt Wellington War Memorial Reserve, Panmure (2012–present)		Merged with **Tāmaki** upon the sale of Liston Park where the club moved to Mt Wellington War Memorial Reserve, Panmure. Presently known as **Auckland Marist Rugby Club.**
**Grammar Schools' Old Boys**	1914	3 x heraldic lions in traditional shield design including Latin motto, '**Per Angusta ad Augusta**' (through hardship to glory).	Victoria Arcade, Shortland Street (1919–1924) Irvine Chambers, Queen St (1924–1928) Victoria Arcade (1928– Newmarket Park (1954 – Ōrākei Domain ( –present	Old Government House Grounds (1914) Victoria Park, Freemans Bay Auckland Grammar School (lower field) c.1930–1950 Shore Rd Reserve Ōrākei Domain ( –present		Merged with Carlton in 1996 to become Grammar-Carlton and then in 2013 merged with Teachers-Eastern to become **Grammar TEC.**
Suburbs						
**Cornwall**	1922		Seddon Memorial Technical College, Wellesley St East, Auckland Central (1922–1950) Cornwall Park (1950–1983)	various including Three Kings Park for practice sessions (1922–1950) Cornwall Park, Puriri Drive, Epsom (1950–1983)	(1937–1979) (1979–1983)	Originally founded as **Technical College Old Boys** the club was renamed to **United** after merging with **Post & Telegraph R.F.C** but reverted to **Technical College Old Boys** from 1927 until 1950 when the name then changed to **Cornwall.**
Eden						
**Teachers**	1922	Stylised white embroidered letter 'T' in a small shield on jersey.	Seddon Memorial Technical College, Wellesley St East, Auckland Central (1922–1926) Auckland College of Education, Epsom (1926–1985) Parnell (clubrooms)(1967–1985)	Auckland Domain (1922–1926) Auckland College of Education, Epsom (1926–1985)		Originally established as **Training College** the name later changed to **Teachers' College** and then **Teachers**. It merged with **Eastern** in 1985 and moved to Ōrākei Domain to become **Teachers-Eastern.**
Manukau Rovers						
**Ōtāhuhu**	1926			Sturges Park, Ōtāhuhu		
Mt Roskill	1945			Fearon Park		Hillsborough
Silverdale United	1963					North Harbour Rugby Union (1985–present)
**Northcote-Birkenhead**	1929		Stafford Park, Northcote (1935–1985) Drill Hall (former Defence Department) Kauri Glen Rd, Northcote (1933–1935) Birkenhead War Memorial Park, Birkenhead (1985–present)	Stafford Park, Northcote (1929 to early 1970s) Birkenhead War Memorial Park, Birkenhead (1974–present)		North Harbour Rugby Union (1985–present)
**Takapuna**	1934	A central shield flanked by two stylised tridents. The shield is bordered in yellow and set against a background of dynamic blue and yellow flourishes. The main shield shows a stylised sailing ship on water and below this is a stylised rugby ball. At the bottom of the crest contains the name **'TAKAPUNA R.F.C'** in white accent.	Tāharoto Rd, Takapuna (1934–1973) Ōnewa Domain, Northcote (1973–present)	see Headquarters		North Harbour Rugby Union (1985–present)
Royal New Zealand Navy	1943					North Harbour Rugby Union (1985–present)
**Te Papapa**	1944	The club name wraps around the outer circle of the badge in bold, capitalized text: '**TE PAPAPA'** at the top, and '**ONEHUNGA'** at the bottom. The text is set in a deep blue or purple hue with a golden-yellow outline. The circle is segmented by two horizontal gold bars. Dominating the center is a stylised '**TP'** monogram—an abbreviation of **Te Papapa.** The large "T" forms the structural base, with a "P" intersecting through it, both drawn in a clean, strong serif style. To the right of the monogram is a symbolic depiction of **One Tree Hill (Maungakiekie)** and atop the hill is the prominent obelisk monument. Beside the hill is the image of a single, wind-swept Monterey pine tree. The hill and tree are rendered in a deep green.	Te Papapa Primary School (1944–1946) Captain Springs Rd, Onehunga (1947–1967) Waikaraka Park, Onehunga (1947–1961)	Waikaraka Park, Onehunga (1947–1961) Fergusson Domain, Te Papapa (1961–present)		Merged with **Mt Wellington** in 2008 and renamed **Maungarua**. This merger was dissolved in 2013. The club is more recently known as **Te Papapa-Onehunga Rugby Football and Sports Club**
**Papatoetoe**	1946	The badge is shield-shaped, outlined primarily in black, red, and white. The shield is flanked on both sides by black laurel branches. At the very top of the badge, there is a stylised image of a waka. Above the waka, in a semi-circular banner, is the club's Māori motto: '**Kia Mahi Tahi'**, which translates to 'Let's work together' or 'Work as one'. Across the lower portion of the shield, within a bold red band, are the words: '**PAPATOETOE RUGBY FOOTBALL CLUB**'	Papatoetoe Recreation Ground, Papatoetoe (1947–present)	Papatoetoe Recreation Ground, Papatoetoe (1947–present)		The club had been active prior to 1946 but had been in recess based on lack of financial and personal interests which were exacerbated by the depression and wartime years.
**East Coast Bays**	1946	club initials 'ECB' in gold lettering above laurel wreath	Freyberg Park, Browns Bay (1954–1989) Windsor Park, Mairangi Bay(1989–present)	Freyberg Park, Browns Bay (1954–1989) Windsor Park, Mairangi Bay (1989–present)	Emerald green_black_hoops_rugby	North Harbour Rugby Union (1985–present)
Eastern	1947			Ōrākei Domain, Ōrākei		Formerly known as **Eastern Suburbs** after being formed from the **Ōrākei United Club**. Merged with **Teachers** in 1985.
Tāmaki	1949	stylised image of a crouching Māori warrior holding a taiaha	Panmure Hotel, Queens Rd Tāmaki Intermediate School Mt Wellington War Memorial Reserve, Panmure (1954–2012)	Panmure Basin, Panmure (training field) (pre-1954) Mt Wellington War Memorial Reserve, Panmure (1954–2012)		Merged with **Marist Brothers Old Boys Rugby Club** in 2012.
**Bay Lynn**	1950		73 Premier Ave, Pt Chevalier (1963–1971) Shadbolt Park, New Lynn (1971–1996)	73 Premier Ave, Pt Chevalier (1963–1971) Shadbolt Park, New Lynn (1971–1996)		Originally established as **Pt Chevalier**, the club changed its name to **Blockhouse Bay Rugby Football Club** in 1968, and then to **Blockhouse Bay / New Lynn District Rugby Football Club** in 1969, commonly abbreviated as **Bay Lynn**. In 1996 the club merged with **Suburbs Rugby Football Club.**
**Hillsborough**	1955	The badge was built around a traditional heraldic shield with a slightly wavy top edge. The shield had a white outline that stood out against the darker patch background. Scarlet and navy dominated the badge. The interior of the shield was scarlet with two thick diagonal white stripes running from the upper left to the lower right. In the upper right corner, there was a stylised rugby ball image also in white. Toward the lower left of the shield, there was a stylised image of a pair of goal posts with pennants on top of each upright and these were also in a white accent outline. At the bottom of the badge was a ribbon-style banner displaying the word '**HILLSBOROUGH'** in bold, uppercase white letters and beneath the banner was the phrase, '**R.F.C.'**	Carlton Reserve, Hillsborough (1956–1961) Keith Hay Park, Mt Roskill (1961–	see Headquarters		Merged with **Mt Roskill** in late c.1988–1989.
**Pakuranga United**	1957					Founded under name of **Howick** and name changed to **Pakuranga** in 1965.
Mt Wellington	1959					
East Tamaki	1961					
Te Atatu	1962					
Western United	1963					North Harbour Rugby Union (1985–present)
Massey	1967					North Harbour Rugby Union (1985–present)
Glenfield	1969					North Harbour Rugby Union (1985–present)
Helensville	1971					North Harbour Rugby Union (1985–present)
**Carlton**	1982		Cornwall Park, Pūriri Drive, Epsom	Cornwall Park, Pūriri Drive, Epsom		The club was created from a merger between the **Cornwall** and **Grafton** clubs. It later merged with **Grammar Old Boys** in 1996.

=== Structure ===
The Auckland Rugby Football Union currently consists of 20 senior representative clubs from the Auckland isthmus and wider region. The premier competition runs from March to August and is split into three segments: the Waka Nathan Challenge Cup from March to May (primarily a pre-season tournament), the Alan McEvoy Round-Robin, and the Championship Round (finals series).

- **The Waka Nathan Challenge Cup and Pollard Cup**

The Waka Nathan Challenge Cup is contested at the beginning of the season in a knockout style competition. Teams play for the cup and a winners prize of $2500. Eight teams compete for the Waka Nathan Cup while the bottom seven teams from the previous year's competition contest the Pollard Cup.

- **The Alan McEvoy Round-Robin**

The 15 teams entered into the Premier Competition play a 15-week round-robin, played on Saturdays. The team with the highest competition points at the end of this round will be awarded the Alan McEvoy Memorial Trophy which commemorates Alan McEvoy an Auckland rep and All Black Trialist who drowned tragically at Baylys Beach in the early 1950s. To determine this, the bonus points system is used. Teams will be seeded 1–16 after this round. The Fred Allen Trophy is also played for during the round-robin phase. It is similar to the Ranfurly Shield, where it is only up for grabs at home games of the trophy holder. It is not contested in the Championship Round.

- **Championship Round**

In the Championship Round the sixteen teams are split into the top and bottom eight. It is played over three weeks. The top eight compete for the Gallaher Shield while the bottom eight compete for the Portola Trophy. The first week is a quarter-finals style format where the top seeded team play the bottom seeded team and the second seeded team play the second to last seeded team etc. The four losers from each group of eight go on to play for the Jubilee Trophy (Gallaher Shield Losers) and the President's Cup (Portola Trophy Losers). The next week is semi-finals and the two winners compete for the four trophies mentioned, with the overall champion being the winner of the Gallaher Shield Final.

=== Gallaher Shield ===
The Gallaher Shield is awarded to the winner of the senior premier club rugby competition, for overall club records see the Gallaher Shield page.

The championship round was renamed the Gallaher Shield in 1922, in memory of Ponsonby, Auckland and New Zealand player Dave Gallaher who captained the 1905 All Blacks, known as The Originals, before retiring after the tour. He became the sole selector to the Auckland team, leading the side to eight successive Ranfurly Shield wins, before he served on the All Blacks selection committee from 1907 to 1914. He then joined the army at a relatively late age, and was killed in the Passchendaele offensive in 1917 aged 43. His Ponsonby side has dominated the Gallaher Shield.

== School competition ==
The union are one of three organisations (the others being Collegesport and the Secondary Schools Executive Committee) responsible for administering the local secondary school competitions. Notable rugby schools in Auckland include Auckland Grammar School, De La Salle College, Kelston Boys High School, King's College, Mount Albert Grammar School, Sacred Heart College and St Kentigern College. The 1st XV competition is split across three divisions, these being 1A, 1B and 1C. In addition to the 1st XV competition there a number of lower-grade (non-1st XV) and girls competitions.

== Supporters Club ==
The Auckland Rugby Union Supporters Club (ARUSC) was established in 1976 after a meeting between ARFU administration and a group of supporters. The club's emblem is the "Flying Elephant", which was agreed upon after a competition to find a mascot was found. The winner of the competition was Mr J.E. Hannan. The supporters club is currently located under the North (ASB) Stand at Eden Park.

The ARUSC also has the Junior Rugby Foundation (JRF) to provide education, assistance and support for the promotion and development of participation by young people in rugby within the areas governed by the ARFU. Recent JRF bursary recipients include Liaki Moli, Sean Polwart and Tyrone Ngaluafe.

== Stadium ==
Auckland play their home matches at Eden Park, and have done so since 1925. The ground opened in 1900 and also is used for cricket. Eden Park has the largest crowd capacity of any New Zealand sporting venue, with a capacity of 50,000 for rugby matches.

== All Blacks ==
This is a list of players who were selected for the New Zealand All Blacks when they were a member of the Auckland senior provincial representative rugby union team. Players are listed by the decade they were first selected in and players in bold are current All Blacks.

=== 1880–1899 ===
- George Carter – 1884
- John Gage Lecky – 1884
- Timothy Beehane O'Connor – 1884
- Thomas Ryan – 1884
- Joseph Astbury Warbrick – 1884
- Francis Mahon Jervis – 1893
- Frederick Murray – 1893
- Charles Richard Barton Speight – 1893
- Maurice Herrold – 1893
- Robert McKenzie – 1893
- Frank Surman – 1896
- Robert Alexander Handcock – 1897
- George William Smith – 1897
- Alexander Wilson – 1897

=== 1900–1919 ===
- William Cunningham – 1901
- William Edward Hay-MacKenzie – 1901
- Robert Wylie McGregor – 1901
- Albert Asher – 1903
- David Gallaher – 1903
- Henry Arthur Douglas Kiernan – 1903
- Andrew Thomas Long – 1903
- George William Nicholson – 1903
- George Alfred Tyler – 1903
- Charles Edward Seeling – 1904
- William Henry Mackrell – 1905
- Arthur Reginald Howe Francis – 1905
- Harold Owen Hayward – 1908
- Michael Joseph O'Leary – 1910
- Frank Reginald Wilson – 1910
- James Richard Maguire – 1910
- Albert Joseph Downing – 1913
- Alwin John McGregor – 1913
- George Maurice Victor Sellars – 1913
- James Thomas Wylie – 1913
- John Alexander Bruce – 1913
- James Barrett – 1913
- William McKail Geddes – 1913
- John Victor Macky – 1913
- James Douglas Stewart – 1913
- John Gerald O'Brien – 1914
- Lynley Herbert Weston – 1914

=== 1920–1939 ===
- Cecil Edward Oliver Badeley – 1920
- Vivian Whitta Wilson – 1920
- Karl Donald Ifwerson – 1921
- Andrew James O'Brien – 1922
- Victor Ivan Roskill Badeley – 1922
- Leonard Stephen Righton – 1923
- Frederick William Lucas – 1923
- Albert Edward Cooke – 1924
- Lawrence Alfred George Knight – 1925
- Arthur Robert Lomas – 1925
- Herman Alfred Mattson – 1925
- Donald Hector Wright – 1925
- Arthur Knight – 1926
- Thomas Reginald Sheen – 1926
- William Alexander Wright – 1926
- Swinbourne Hadley – 1928
- Ruben George McWilliams – 1928
- Walter Batty – 1928
- Victor Claude Butler – 1928
- Llewellyn Simpkin Hook – 1928
- Bertram Pitt Palmer – 1928
- Mervyn Miles Nelson Corner – 1930
- Frank Solomon – 1931
- Thomas Harcourt Clarke Caughey – 1932
- William Edward Hadley – 1934
- Cyril Stennart Pepper – 1935
- David Solomon – 1935
- Henry Mackay Brown – 1935
- Brian Alexander Killeen – 1936
- Terence McClatchey Lockington – 1936
- John Dick – 1937
- William Nicol Carson – 1938

=== 1940–1959 ===
- Frederick Richard Allen – 1946
- John Markham Dunn – 1946
- Maurice James McHugh – 1946
- Robert William Henry Scott – 1946
- Eric George Boggs – 1946
- John George Simpson – 1947
- Percy Laurence Tetzlaff – 1947
- Neville Henry Thornton – 1947
- Arthur Maitland Hughes – 1947
- Neville Wyatt Black – 1949
- Patrick Joseph Bourke Crowley – 1949
- Desmond Lawrence Christian – 1949
- Ronald Leslie Dobson – 1949
- John Wallace Kelly – 1949
- John Maurice Tanner – 1950
- Charles Percy Erceg – 1951
- David Ross Wightman – 1951
- Selwyn George Bremner – 1952
- Keith Davis – 1952
- Jack Robert Skeen – 1952
- Hallard Leo White – 1953
- Terence Raymond Lineen – 1957
- Raymond Frank McMullen – 1957
- Wilson James Whineray – 1957
- Adrian Hipkins Clarke – 1958

=== 1960–1979 ===
- William Anthony Davies – 1960
- Steven Roberto Nesbit – 1960
- Desmond Michael Connor – 1961
- Donald William McKay – 1961
- Paul Francis Little – 1961
- Waka Joseph Nathan – 1962
- MacFarlane Alexander Herewini – 1962
- Barry Trevor Thomas – 1962
- Malcolm John Dick – 1963
- Peter Henry Murdoch – 1964
- Ronald Edward Rangi – 1964
- Grahame Stuart Thorne – 1967
- Ronald Anthony Urlich – 1970
- Bryan George Williams – 1970
- Kenneth Roy Carrington – 1971
- Peter John Whiting – 1971
- Andrew Maxwell Haden – 1972
- Bruce Mcleod Gemmell – 1974
- Lawrence Gibb Knight – 1974
- Jon Stanley McLachlan – 1974
- Christopher Louis Fawcett – 1976
- Bradley Ronald Johnstone – 1976
- Stuart Bruce Conn – 1976
- Colin Paul Farrell – 1977
- Barry Graeme Ashworth – 1978
- Gary Richard Cunningham – 1979
- Timothy Moore Twigden – 1979

=== 1980–1989 ===
- Gregory Alexander John Burgess – 1980
- Gary William Whetton – 1981
- David Edward Kirk – 1983
- Alan James Whetton – 1984
- John James Kirwan – 1984
- Grant James Fox – 1984
- John Gordon Mills – 1984
- Kurt Sherlock – 1985
- Steven Clark McDowall – 1985
- John Alan Drake – 1985
- Mark Brooke-Cowden – 1986
- Gregory John Luke Cooper – 1986
- Sean Brian Thomas Fitzpatrick – 1986
- Joseph Tito Stanley – 1986
- Terence John Wright – 1986
- Michael Niko Jones – 1987
- Zinzan Valentine Brooke – 1987
- Bernard Joseph McCahill – 1987
- Va'aiga Lealuga Tuigamala – 1989
- Craig Ross Innes – 1989
- Matthew John Ridge – 1989

=== 1990–1999 ===
- Olo Max Brown
- Mark Peter Carter – 1991
- Jason Alexander Hewett – 1991
- Eroni Clarke – 1992
- Robin Matthew Brooke – 1992
- Patrick Richard Lam – 1992
- Craig William Dowd – 1993
- Lee Stensness – 1993
- Shane Paul Howarth – 1993
- Carlos James Spencer – 1995
- Adrian Richard Cashmore – 1996
- Andrew Francis Blowers – 1996
- Ofisa Francis Junior Tonu'u – 1996
- Charles Calvin Riechelmann – 1997
- Jeremy Crispian Stanley – 1997
- Kees Junior Meeuws – 1998
- Xavier Joseph Rush – 1998
- Dylan Gabriel Mika – 1999

=== 2000– ===
- Doug Howlett – 2000
- Steve Devine – 2002
- Ali Williams – 2002
- Brad Mika – 2002
- Keven Mealamu – 2002
- Daniel Braid – 2002
- Joe Rokocoko – 2003
- Mils Muliaina – 2003
- Ben Atiga – 2003
- Sam Tuitupou – 2004
- Saimone Taumoepeau – 2004
- Jerome Kaino – 2004
- Piri Weepu – 2004
- Derren Witcombe – 2005
- Angus Macdonald – 2005
- John Afoa – 2005
- Isaia Toeava – 2005
- Benson Stanley – 2010
- Charlie Faumuina – 2012
- Steven Luatua – 2013
- Charles Piutau – 2013
- Malakai Fekitoa – 2013
- Patrick Tuipulotu – 2014
- Ofa Tu'ungafasi – 2016
- Rieko Ioane – 2016
- Akira Ioane – 2017
- Dalton Papali'i – 2018
- Caleb Clarke – 2020
- Hoskins Sotutu – 2020
- Alex Hodgman – 2020
- Angus Ta'avao – 2021
- Harry Plummer – 2024
