= George Mitchell (rugby league) =

New Zealander rugby player (1914–1986)

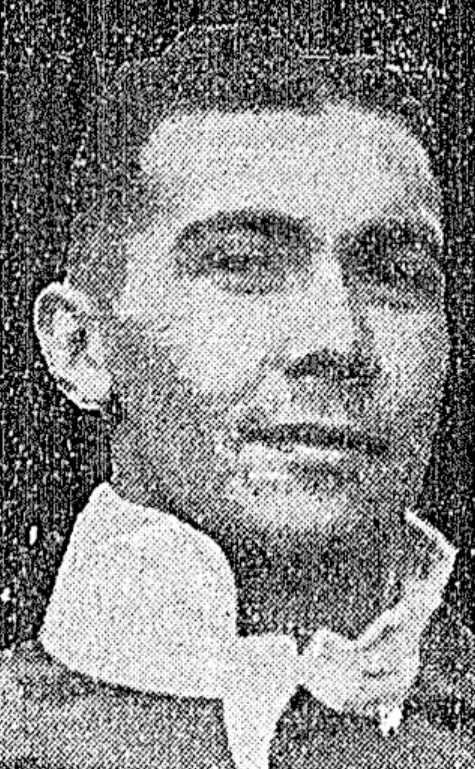

Personal information
- Full name: George Gordon Mitchell
- Born: 1 October 1914 Rarotonga, Cook Islands
- Died: 24 March 1986 (aged 71) Auckland, New Zealand

Playing information
- Weight: 14 st 7 lb (203 lb; 92 kg)

Rugby league
- Position: Second-row
Club
Years	Team	Pld	T	G	FG	P
1937–1942	Richmond Rovers	70	26	0	0	78
1945–1947	Ponsonby United	19	4	0	0	12
	Total	89	30	0	0	90
Representative
Years	Team	Pld	T	G	FG	P
1937–1945	Auckland	3	1	0	0	3
1937–1945	Auckland Māori	6	2	0	0	6
1937	New Zealand Māori	2	2	0	0	6
1939–1947	New Zealand Trial	3	1	0	0	3
1939	New Zealand	1	0	0	0	0
1942	All Golds	1	2	0	0	6

Rugby union
- Position: Lock, Number eight,
Club
Years	Team	Pld	T	G	FG	P
1932–36	Feilding Old Boys	46	8	0	0	24
1933	Grafton	2	0	0	0	0
1942–43	Motor Transport Pool (M.T.P.)	28	7	4	0	32
	Total	76	15	4	0	56
Representative
Years	Team	Pld	T	G	FG	P
1932	Manawatu Trial	1	1	0	0	3
1932–33	Manawatu	12	3	0	0	9
1932	Manawhenua	3	1	0	0	3
1942	Auckland	3	0	0	0	0
1942	Northern Military District	1	0	0	0	0
1942	Auckland Army	1	1	0	0	3
- Education: Feilding Agricultural High School
- Relatives: Alf Mitchell (brother), Sir Bryan Williams (nephew)

George Gordon Mitchell played for the Richmond Rovers rugby league club in Auckland from 1937 to 1942 and represented Auckland from 1937 to 1947 as well as Auckland Māori from 1937 to 1945 and New Zealand Māori in 1937. He was also selected for New Zealand for the 1939, tour of England. He played rugby union for Manawatu in the early 1930s and Auckland when he was serving in the military in the early 1940s.

== Early life ==
George Gordon Mitchell was born in Rarotonga, Cook Islands on 1 October 1914. His mother was Samoan born Mele Mataele (Mitchell). His father was Ernest Hamilton Rea Mitchell. Ernest was born in Litherland, Merseyside, England and had been traveling the Pacific Islands when he met Mele. They had several children, including Ernest Mitchell, Jane Eusenia Mitchell, Evelyn Jane Violet Mitchell, Sarah Evelyn Thompson, Agnes Catherine Bouchier, Caroline Beatrice Taripo, Robert Edward Mitchell, Henry Hamilton Mitchell, Dugald Trevor Mitchell, Alfred Derwent Mitchell, and George. The children were born in a variety of islands, including Samoa, Tonga, and the Cook Islands.

Dugald, who was born in 1907 died aged just 1 in 1908. The eldest son, Ernest was killed on 24 September 1916, in World War I at the Somme when most of his siblings were very young. Ernest had been educated at Auckland Grammar School and the school website has an article on his life. George's older brother, Alfred (Alf) would also go on to represent New Zealand at rugby league in 1935.

In the late 1920s George was living in Auckland before being sent to study at Feilding Agricultural High School near Palmerston North around the start of 1931. His older brother Alfred had been sent to the same school in 1928. That same year Alfred equalled the high school record for the 220 yards senior championship with a time of 25 seconds.

== Playing career ==
=== Early Rugby Union and High School Sport ===
In 1930 when aged 15 George was playing rugby for the Grafton club in Auckland in their Fifth Grade team. In 1933 when he was briefly back in Auckland on holiday he played two games for their senior side before returning to the Manawatū.

After moving to Feilding, Mitchell became heavily involved in various aspects of the Feilding Agricultural High School (present day Feilding High School). On 25 March he finished third in the Campbell Shield quarter-mile swimming race. On 26 July at the St. Paul's Presbyterian Church, the tenth annual opening of Commemoration Week took place and "after the opening of the service, the 11th chapter of Ecclesiastes was read by one of the house captains, G. Mitchell, of Rarotonga…". In mid September the Feilding Aero Club held a Plain and Fancy Dress Ball at the Drill Hall. Mitchell went as a "South Sea Islander", another less commonly used term for a Pacific Islander. At the end of the school year on 9 December the annual prize giving was held at the Parish Hall. Mitchell won several awards including the late Mr. Norman Gorton's challenge cup for practical agriculture, a Certificate in Agriculture, War Trophies Exhibition Committee's challenge cup for Merit went to Vera Whisker with Mitchell "next in order", and he was captain of the Champion House on the boys' side of the school.

=== Feilding Old Boys, Manawatu, and Manawhenua (1932) ===
In 1932 Mitchell began playing for the Feilding Old Boys rugby club. He was named to play in the senior side in a friendly match against Dannevirke Pirates on 9 April at Johnston Park. He played in a second practice match against Kimbolton on 16 April again at Johnstone Park. The team scored two 'decisive victories' in those games. Mitchell was named among four "junior forwards who stand good chances of finding themselves in senior company". He was named in their 18-man senior squad to play their final practice game at Spriggens Park on 23 April against Wanganui Old Boys.

During the following week in a preview of the various teams in the competition it was said that "the newcomers in the green forward line will be M. Eade, Crump, and Mitchell. All of these reinforcements possess size and weight, the last two being included in the Feilding High School 1st XV last year when they shaped very well". The Manawatu Times said that he would be a "familiar figure in the forward ranks" but ultimately he was not chosen in the side to play their opening game against Palmerston North Old Boys. He was not selected in any of the following three games either. It is most likely that he was injured as he was not even named in their game day extended squads.

His debut came in a game against United on 28 May which they won 13 to 9. He appears to have played in one of the lock positions in the second row of the scrum. On Friday, 3 June, Mitchell was named to play in the Feilding Old Boys seven-a-side team for a tournament at the showgrounds at Palmerston North. They won the tournament undefeated to take the Thompson and Payne Cup. The following day he played for the full senior side in a game against Palmerston North Old Boys which Feilding OBs won 26 to 7. The Manawatu Times said that "the outstanding Feilding forward was Mitchell, a young player, who was in the Feilding High School team last year, and he is giving every indication of developing into a fine forward".

He played again in their 11–8 win over local rivals Feilding, on 11 June. After the game Mitchell was named in the Manawatu Trial game to be played at the Showgrounds on 18 June. He was selected in the forwards for the North team. The game was drawn 6–6 but ruined somewhat by heavy rain in the preceding 24 hours which left the field heavy and it soon became a "quagmire". The Manawatū Standard reported that K. Fitzgerald and Mitchell "showed to advantage". He was then selected to play for the Northern team again in a second trial set down for 28 June.

The weekend prior to the second trial he played well in Feilding OB's 10–8 win over Massey College at Johnston Park. When they trailed 0–3 "Mitchell was in the van of the greens' next thrust, which followed an indifferent back line movement, and in the struggle along the blues' goal Pawson handed on for Bramwell to score". Later in the half he and Kilpatrick when they were defending were "handy to arrest the invaders". The trial match was played midweek on Wednesday, 29 June at Feilding with Mitchell's North side winning 14–10. Down 3–10 at halftime the North attacked with "Smith, Beard, and Mitchell in the van of the drive and before the South backs could rally in force, Mitchell had dived through the ruck to score in the corner". Late in the game he "picked up in the loose to send a long pass right out to Moffatt, who accepted the leather at speed to cross wide out". The following Saturday he played in Feilding OB's 17–3 loss to Kia Toa. During the game "Crump and Mitchell secured possession and with nothing in front of them, dribbled over the line. It looked a guinea-to-a-gooseberry chance that Crump would score but Mullins" sprinted in and got a bounce which helped him save the try.

==== Manawatu ====
Mitchell was selected in the Manawatū representative side to play the Te Kawau sub-union side on 6 July. The Manawatu side was not fully representative of Manawatu as they were playing a side that was a sub-union team of their region with the match serving as a trial to pick the full Manawatu team to play Horowhenua. Manawatu won 19–3 at Sanson. In the second half "Mitchell started a movement from the ruck, and the ball went to Plank, to Bramwell, and to Elliott" who made a great run to score. Returning to his club side the only mention of him in an 8–3 win over United on 16 July was when he caught an attempted penalty and made a clearing kick. They had a narrow loss to Palmerston North OB's on 23 July by 17 to 16. In comments on the match it was said that "Mitchell was a pillar of strength in the green vanguard, and, in spite of his weight, was always on the ball in the loose". In spite of his good form he missed selection for the Manawatu team to play Horowhenua. Feilding OB's then beat Feilding 34–17 with Mitchell once again in the second row, before a default win over Massey College. After the default the Manawatu team to play their second match with Horowhenua was named and this time Mitchell was included in the forwards.

Manawatu and Horowhenua drew 19-all at Ōtaki on 10 August with Mitchell scoring one try. In the first half he made a solo effort breaking through and gaining ground which allowed them to open up, the ball then went through several hands with Cooper eventually secured the ball and scored. A short time later Olliver "cut through the defences brilliantly. The five eighth then handed on to Mitchell for the big scrummager to complete". Returning to his Feilding OB's side they lost 19–18 to Kia Toa. With just three minutes remaining Kia Toa attacked and "Mitchell failed to take Wasley who was able to recover a large slice of territory" and a sweeping backline movement led to them scoring the winning try. They then beat United 16–13 on 20 August. The "opening stages were brisk, Feilding Old Boys attacked from the kick-off, a sustained movement carrying play to United goal line" and Mitchell scored. The Manawatū Standard wrote "Crump and Mitchell, two Feilding Old Boys forwards who played a prominent part in the greens opening score, are youthful players who should have a good future. Both are playing good football at present".

Mitchell's form saw him chosen in the Manawatu side to meet Southern Hawke's Bay on 24 August. The match was played at Feilding with Manawatu winning a "patchy game" 26 points to 11. The Manawatu forwards played well throughout the match and towards the end of the game they gained some reward for their work when "Mitchell worked his was across near the posts for Amadio to add the extras". The Manawatu Times described it in a little more detail saying it was from a loose rush which took the game to the line and he dived over to make the score 19–11.

Mitchell was then selected for the Manawhenua representative side to play against Wairarapa at Masterton on 27 August. He was named as "back rank" meaning the modern day #8 position. Manawhenua lost the game 22 to 16. The "visitors were decidedly unfortunate [when] they lost Mitchell, one of their best forwards, near the end of the first spell". While he was still on the field their scrum was dominating with McKenzie, Cooper, and Mitchell being conspicuous by their efforts". Both he and Olliver who was also injured were unable to make the teams trip to play Taranaki and Wanganui (Whanganui). Days later it was reported that neither may be able to play again this season, though after taking the following weekend off from club rugby, Mitchell was back in the Manawhenua side to play Wairarapa in their return game on 10 September. Manawhenua won 26–6 at the Palmerston North Showgrounds with Mitchell scoring a try. Towards the end of the game when they were on attack "Mitchell bullocked his way over the line". Then on full time he "set the blue forwards going in some loose passing, but nothing came of the move" and time sounded. After the match Mitchell was named in the second row of the Manawhenua team to play Wellington on 17 September at the Showgrounds. The match was described as "brilliant" and ended in an 18–18 draw. In the closing stages Palmer and Mitchell were "crippled" in a forward pack which had "quite outplayed" their opposition up to that point. Wellington scored two quick converted tries in the last ten minutes to tie the scores. Both players received medical attention and were able to carry on.

He returned to his Feilding OB's side for their game against United on 24 September and scored another try. His second came when he "found his way over wide out following a tussle on the line" which gave them a 13–5 lead. In his final game of the season he scored again in a 10–4 win over Kia Toa on 8 October. In comments on the game it was said that the grass was very long, measuring four inches to a foot in length "at Johnston Park… [while] Mitchell played a splendid game for the greens". In the first half Feilding OB's attacked and when the forwards kicked over the line "Shapleski and Mitchell got there together". Earlier he lost a try for his side by getting offside when his side looked like scoring. The Manawatu Times described the try in more detail saying that Mitchell touched the ball first and Shapleski fell on it "to make doubly sure". Later on he "worried the defenders into forcing" in their own in goal. The win meant they tied for the Goldfinch and Cousins knockout competition but Kia Toa were later awarded the title on a protest, while Feilding OB's also finished runner up in the championship.

With the rugby season over Mitchell now began playing cricket. On 5 November he played for Old Boys at Kowhai Park and was their best bowler taking five for 10 and scoring 11 runs in a first innings defeat. In March he was bowled for five in another game against Feilding.

==== 1933 season (Feilding OB's and Grafton (Auckland)) ====
In a meeting of the Feilding Old Boys in early March 1933 the club congratulated Mitchell and Bramwell on their selection in the Manawhenua representative side. At their annual meeting on 10 March he was elected on to their club committee. In preseason comments about the Feilding OB's by the Manawatu Standard it was said that Mitchell had "added about a stone to his weight since last year". On 22 April he scored a try in a preseason game against Waituna. Then a week later he played in their season opening game against United which they won 41–8.

Feilding had a bye the following weekend but Mitchell had gone to Auckland on "holiday". While there he joined the senior side from his old club, Grafton, and was named to play in their game against Grammar School Old Boys on 6 May. Grafton upset their opponents 17–11 on Eden Park #2 field with Mitchell said to have supported A. Finlayson and Fraser well. The New Zealand Herald complimented their forward pack and said that "Shadbolt, Fraser, Crump and Mitchell may yet come in for consideration for higher honours". The NZ Herald assumed incorrectly that Mitchell had permanently moved to Auckland, along with getting his residency and ethnicity wrong when they wrote "the already strong Grafton pack has gained a fine all-round forward in Mitchell, who hails from Horowhenua. He is a Māori and on Saturday last against Grammar he was one of the best forwards on the ground. His line-out work was the subject of very favourable comment from the spectators". He played one more game for Grafton on 13 May against Teaching College which they lost 17–12 in the early game at Eden Park #1. It was reported that he played a "good game" in their forwards.

It was reported in the Manawatu Standard on 15 May they mentioned that Mitchell would be soon returning from his holiday. Back in Manawatu it was reported that Mitchell had played for another senior team while on holiday and the Feilding club "asked for a ruling as to whether he would be eligible to play for the club on Saturday. In explanation the secretary stated it was understood that though Mitchell was an old member of the club that Feilding would object to his taking the field on the ground that he had not yet complied with the residential clause". His first game back for Feilding OB's was against Feilding on 20 May. The Manawatu Standard said that "Mitchell, although a thorn in the Feilding plan of movements, was hardly up to form". In an upset 5–3 loss to Kia Toa he was involved in an attacking move with C. Elliott early in the second half. In the second half he was injured and left the field before returning. Later he took a penalty kick at goal but it "narrowly missed the posts from far out". he also spurred the attack on and "toed the leather sharply to the line. F. Elliott ran round in a burst of speed to beat Mitchell for possession and the crowd rose to acclaim a try". Elliott, however, was apparently offside and the referee ordered a scrum back". The following weekend Mitchell played for Feilding OB's in their seven-a-side team in the Thompson-Payne Cup. It was the Manawatu Union's Birthday tournament at the Palmerston North showgrounds. He scored a try in the 11–5 win in the final over Oroua Downs. He had also scored a try in an earlier game against Taikorea after he "raced through the entire opposition".

In a 21–16 win over St Patrick's on 10 June Mitchell strained his leg. They had a bye the following weekend before beating United 12–6 on 24 June. In comments on the game it was said that "Conrad and Mitchell secured a large share of the ball on the line-outs. The latter performed a vast amount of hard work in the tight". With the representative season approaching, Mitchell was named in a possible Manawatu side by the Manawatu Standard.

He played in one more game for Feilding against Massey College on 1 July before being named in the Manawatu team to play Bush midweek on 5 July. Manawatu won 21–0. Late in the game "from a defensive position Mitchell threw a wide pass to Waldin, who dashed through and then sent on to Elliott, who was left with a clear field" and ran in for a try. The Manawatu Standard said that "Mitchell was probably the outstanding member of the local pack". Mitchell was named in the Manawatu side to play three days later on Saturday 8 July against Horowhenua. He was selected at lock for the game which was to be played in Levin. Manawatu won narrowly by 6 points to 5. The only mention of Mitchell was when they made a nice passing move and eventually Flowers sent the ball on to Mitchell but he dropped the ball and the attack died out.

Returning to the Feilding OB's side for the following weekend he scored a try in a 30–3 win over Palmerston North Old Boys at Johnston Park. His try came late in the match "from a loose scrummage on the black twenty-five to hand on to Mitchell, the big forward scoring". At the end of the game following a try he took the conversion attempt but missed. Afterwards he was selected in the Manawatu side to play Hawke's Bay on Thursday 20 July at Nelson Park in Hastings. Before 3,000 spectators Manawatu lost a close game 21–15 with the visitors scoring five unconverted tries. Mitchell was criticised when it was said that on several occasions when they were right on the opposition try line he handled in the scrum. He was penalised for it three or four times and was "fortunate in escaping notice on at least two other occasions". Though they went on to say that "apart from that he was a splendid worker". Feilding OB's easily beat their local rivals Feilding two days later by 28 to 6 with Mitchell involved in some of their attacking movements. The same weekend Feilding High School had a commemoration week with an annual dinner and meeting of members. Old Boys in Taihape arranged a "successful gathering which was attended by Messrs Wild, Stevens, and George Mitchell". The next weekend Feilding OB's had a 9–5 win against Kia Toa. Mitchell scored a try when he took the ball cleanly from a lineout near their opponents line and fell over after forcing his way over wide out. He "shone in the lineouts" for them. Earlier in the match he took a mark from in front of the posts but was too far out to be able to kick the goal.

Mitchell was selected at lock once more by Mr. A. W. Thompson for Manawatu to play Horowhenua on 29 July at Palmerston North. Manawatu had a surprisingly easy 23–0 win with Mitchell scoring one of their tries. It occurred straight from the kick off when "McKenzie, Hight, Cooper and Mitchell handled in a hand to hand bout for the Feilding Old Boys player to complete". The Feilding Star described it as "a strong forward rush". The Manawatu Times went into further detail writing "Manawatu set the ball in motion and within a minute of the start were three points on as the result of one of the best bits of work seen for a very long time. The kick, a short one, was deflected by a Horowhenua man and gathered in by Mitchell, the raking Feilding forward, and he set off for the line. Threatened, he passed to Cooper, who made ground before sending on to Hight. The last named drew the defence and fired the ball back to Mitchell, who went over for a great try near the posts". H Ormond then added the conversion.

He was chosen again at lock for the Manawatu team to meet Canterbury on 9 August at the Palmerston North Showgrounds. Canterbury were the current Ranfurly Shield holders though it was not on the line as they were playing away. Before a crowd of 3,000 Manawatu won 11–8 with Mitchell featuring heavily throughout the game. Early in the game Hight broke away but Mitchell was not at home to the pass and the game returned to the Manawatu 25. In the first half Dunshea, the Canterbury winger attacked and centred a kick which Mitchell "save by marking". With play hanging in the midfield he "dashed through and lined near the corner". Manawatu's second try came "when Mitchell tore his way through the Canterbury pack and passed to Strange, who went to the five yards line, where from a scramble Waldin sent the whole backline away to finish off the movement himself". In the second half "Mitchell burst away from a line-out to find touch" and clear them from defence. A while later he made another clearing kick when they were under pressure and then a short time later he had to go down on the ball again but was penalised with Hazlehurst kicking the goal to narrow the score to 8–3 in favour of Manawatu. Canterbury attacked later on and Mortlock took a pass from Pawson but "was floored by Mitchell and Strange". In the final quarter the game was held up when Mitchell was injured but he was able to continue. With Manawatu clinging to their three-point lead Canterbury gained ground from a penalty "but Mitchell and then McKenzie were instrumental in driving them back to their line". In comments on the game it was said that "Manawatu had three big men assisting them, Mitchell and McKenzie having a stone advantage over the heaviest southerner". And that "Mitchell, McKenzie and Cooper were outstanding for Manawatu and the trio will be in the running for the North Island team". He, Bramwell, and Waldin also supported the backs well on defence and things would have gone badly for them had they not. The Levin Daily Chronicle wrote that "the Feilding man, Mitchell was outstandingly good". The Canterbury side in comments on the game wrote "The Manawatu game we thought we could win, but we were surprised by one of the finest packs of forwards seen in New Zealand for many years", stated Mr. J.K. Moloney, manager of the Canterbury touring team on his return to Christchurch. Mitchell, a giant Samoan, dominated the play, and when he had the ball Mr Moloney described him as a "real menace". He forced his way through line outs and rucks and many times rushed through the inside backs before he could be stopped. If Mitchell maintained his form, said Maloney, New Zealand had found a great player".

Mitchell was missing from the Feilding Old Boys side to play St Patricks, with the side already having secured the championship. It was reported before their next match with Kia Toa on 19 August that he "will again take the field after a brief spell". They won 13–3 with "Manawatu's two potential North Island representatives, Mitchell and McKenzie, both got through a lot of good work". He was subsequently picked by the sole selector, A. W. Thompson in the Manawatu second row to play Wanganui at Johnston Park in Feilding on 23 August. Manawatu won 23 to 16 before a "large crowd". In the second half Mitchell "got away from the press" and "sent Strange away, the winger getting close up…" while in the opposition quarter they eventually recovered a kick and scored.

Back in the Feilding OB team he scored a try in their 10–8 win over United. From a scrum he was involved in a blindside movement and then after accepting a reverse pass he crossed. They then beat Feilding 16–5 on 2 September. Late in the match "Mitchell, tearing his way out of the ruck to roll over several tacklers and hand on to Wilson, the latter dashing away to beat W. McCorkingdale" to score. He was named once more in the Manawatu team to play Wairarapa at the Palmerston North Showgrounds on 9 September.

Mitchell's magnificent form was rewarded in a nomination by the Manawatu Union for the North Island team. In this era with no television coverage and selectors unable to travel the country seeing all the prospective players the respective unions would nominate players they though were performing the best and up to the standard. Mitchell was one of only two players they nominated, the other being R. MacC. McKenzie. There were 32 players nominated in total, with Mitchell the youngest, still being only 18 years old, just short of his 19th birthday. He ultimately was not chosen by the North Island selectors. In the meantime he was selected in Manawatu's last home game of the season against Wairarapa for their 9 September game. Manawatu won 17–8 with Jack Hemi in the opposition. He would also go on to switch codes and represent New Zealand, playing against and with Mitchell in Auckland in the mid to late 1930s and early 1940s. During the first half Cooper and Mitchell put Manawatu on attack in the Wanganui corner. In comments after the game the Manawatu Standard said that he and McKenzie "were prominent figures. Both got through a lot of hard work…".

Feilding OB's played a special match against Kaierau on 13 September for the Licensed Victuallers Cup Challenge match. The game was played at Spriggens Park in Wanganui. In a preview of the game the Wanganui Chronicle wrote a "player to attract interest is George Mitchell, the 18 year-old lad from the Feilding Old Boys' pack. He is 15 stone and stands six feet in his socks. He is a fine stamp of footballer, rangy and always on the job, and for a young player he is possessed of remarkable anticipation. His spectacular play has made him a great favourite with rugby fans in the district for he shirks nothing in the tight and is brilliant in the loose. He has an excellent paid of hands; is fast, and very hard to oull down as he demonstrated in the recent Canterbury game at Palmerston North, at the conclusion of which. Jack Manchester, of All Black fame, had something to say about the difficulty of upending this forward. Mitchell is a player who would hold his own in an All Black XV. He has been nominated for the North Island team". Feilding went down in the game by 14 points to 10.

His final two games of the season were for Manawatu against Wellington B and Wairarapa. The first was at Athletic Park in Wellington on 17 September. It was reported that the two North Island nominees Mitchell and McKenzie "did not impress" in their 14–11 loss. The two of them were watched closely from the sidelines. The Manawatu Standard said that their forwards as a whole gave a disappointing performance though Mitchell and McKenzie "worked tirelessly the whole game" but struggled to standout. During the second half "Mitchell broke away and sent on to Ormond, who sent on to Mckenzie" who was tackled just short of the line. Then later in the game he was injured and had to be replaced by Smith. His last game came in a 19–17 loss to Wairarapa at Memorial Park on 30 September. Early in the game Mitchell charged down a kick which allowed Mckenzie to come up and score". At the end of the season at their prize giving the Feilding Old Boys club presented a trophy for being the most outstanding senior player by club patron, Mr. L.J. Wild. It was said that he had "certainly distinguished" himself during the season.

=== Feilding Old Boys and Serious Health Issue (1934) ===
In March, Mitchell was elected to the Feilding Old Boys club committee. His first game for the senior side was on 7 April in a practice match against Awahuri at their opponents ground and they won 14–9. He then played in a second practice game against Wanganui Old Boys on 14 April which was won 25–19. Mitchell missed the final practice game against Waituna before returning to the side for their championship opening game against St Patricks on 28 April. They suffered a surprise 20–15 loss. Just after halftime "a wide-flung pass by Devine to Mitchell sent them away, the ball going from hand to hand until the advance was halted just short of its objective" however they scored shortly after.

Their first win was a week later, 3–0 over Kia Toa. "In the tight scrummaging Eade and Mitchell were always in the thick of it…". They then beat the rival Feilding side 32–0 at Johnston Park in Feilding. He was "excellent and took a lot of handling" with the ball. In the closing stages of the game "Finlay, Wilson, and Mitchell were associated in a movement which terminated in Trass emerging from the melee and scoring". Mitchell played in a 20–5 win over Massey College on 19 May, and a 19–11 win over United on 26 May.

Mitchell's season was cut short following Feilding OB's 14–11 win against Palmerston North Old Boys on 2 June. Early in the game Mitchell went off in possession and when tackled passed to F. Elliott. Elliot crossed the line, but it was ruled back for a forward pass. In comments on the game it was said that "Mitchell stirred himself to greater effort on Saturday and he bore the lion's share of the heavy work for Feilding Old Boys". Two days later it was reported in the Manawatu Standard that "the compulsory retirement of Mitchell, the Feilding Old Boys burly scrummager, as a result of having strained his heart in the game versus Palmerston North Old Boys on Saturday, will be greatly regretted by all rugby supporters. Last year Mitchell was one of the Manawatu nominees for the North Island team, and it was not improbably that he would again secure nomination this year for he had displayed a return to his old form in Saturday's memorable struggle. However, the physical strain proved to be too great and, acting under medical orders, he has decided to retire from active play for a time at least. It will be the hope of all supporters that his absence will be briefer than expected".

Following his retirement, the Manawatu representative side began the season without him. The Manawatu Standard commented that "it is most unfortunate that Mitchell (F.O.B.) is lost to Manawatu as a partner for Roderick McKenzie in the centre of the scrum. The absence of this burly lockman is now making it self-evident". The newspaper also wrote that his compulsory retirement this year lost to the green and had deprived the team of "one of their big and fast scrummagers", arguing that his absence alongside McKenzie in the centre of the scrum had proved to be "a serious loss – more serious than was really thought at the time".

==== 1935 Non Playing ====
Feilding Old Boys held their annual general meeting on 18 March 1935. At it, committee member, J. Finlay "in connection with the illness of Mr. Mitchell … suggested that something should be done towards helping this player whose misfortune was largely due to injuries received while playing rugby". It was supported and the committee was left to consider ways to deal with the matter with a benefit match one of the suggestions. The match arranged was on 13 April against Apiti at Johnston Park. The home side won 9–0 before a good crowd in drizzling rain. In the evening the "Feilding club entertained the visitors from Apiti at a dinner to which George Mitchell was invited and the opportunity taken to hand over the total proceeds of the silver collection made at the match on his behalf".

==== Return to Playing (1936) ====
Mitchell finally returned to the field in Feilding Old Boy's match with Palmerston North Old Boys on 30 May, just 3 days short of two years since his last game which was against the same opponent. In the first half he "gained possession and set play in neutral territory". He missed a chance to score when the ball came away to him "but the big forward was unable to pick up and the territorial advantage along with a promising try faded out". Late in the match he secured the ball from a midfield scrum and passed to Thurston and sent on to Nelson Ball and then Waugh who scored in their 13–3 win. Ball was an All Black from 1931 to 1936 and was the father of future well known cartoonist Murray Ball. In comments on the game the Manawatu Standard wrote that George Mitchell was "making his first appearance since his illness of two years ago. He played well, but was naturally not the raking forward of past years, though his rucking and line-out work were good. Towards the end of the game he suffered a knock in the face and had to retire. Followers of the game were pleased to see him in action again and hope that he will keep fit". In a win over St Patricks a week later "Mitchell and Ewart were prominent in the forwards". In early season representative prospects the Manawatu Standard said "on the side row I would have G. Mitchell and Powell".

Mitchell missed their next game against Kia Toa on 13 June before being named in their seven-a-side tournament team for 23 June. He played in games against Feilding B, Massey College, and Feilding A over the following month.

Mitchell's first try of the season came in 19–12 win over Palmerston North Old Boys on 25 July which gave them the championship win for 1936. In the second half he was standing loose from a scrum when he "grabbed the ball and cleared his way through the defending backs for a surprise solo try". He missed their game with St Patricks a week later but then scored once more in their next match with Feilding on 22 August. It came after the backs had launched an attack which ended when "Mitchell strolled in to register under the crossbar". He played once more in a special match with the Wellington champions, Athletic, on 19 September which Feidling Old Boys won 18–11. His final game of the season came a week later on 26 September when they won the knockout competition, defeating Palmerston North Old Boys 27 to 14 at the showgrounds.

=== Rugby League ===
==== Move to Auckland, and Switch to Rugby League (1937) ====
Early in 1937 Mitchell moved to Auckland where he had lived in his younger years. He also switched codes, joining the Richmond Rovers rugby league club which was based in Grey Lynn. It was the club where his older brother Alf had played senior football for from 1933 to 1936 before representing New Zealand in one test in 1935. His first more game for them was in a trial match at Fowld's Park in Morningside against Mount Albert United on 10 April where he was "conspicuous" with fellow newcomer, Jack McLeod who had joined from Taranaki. They were both subsequently named to play in the loose forwards for their preliminary round game against Manukau on 17 April. They won 15 to 11 at Carlaw Park in the main 3pm match on the number 1 field. A week later in their second preliminary game Mitchell was said to be "outstanding" and an "impressive newcomer" in a 17–10 win over Ponsonby. The New Zealand Herald wrote that "a feature of the game was the brilliant play of G. Mitchell, a forward from the Manawatu district. He showed fine anticipation in the loose, and handled the ball well".

His debut championship game came in round 1 in the main match at Carlaw Park against Mount Albert on 1 May. Richmond won 13–10 with Mitchell scoring two of their tries. The Auckland Star said "G. Mitchell, a newcomer to the forwards, was outstanding, and in scoring two tries revealed that he has football brains as well as determination when near the line". The Herald reported "shortly after the resumption, Mitchell, a fine stamp and new forward for Richmond, gained possession from a scrum, and, although tackled, his weight took him over. The same player scored again when a fine movement by the backs saw the ball swung infield again". Throughout the game he was always prominent along with other forwards Jack Satherley, Bill Telford, and Harold Tetley. In comments during the week the Herald wrote that "Richmond has a decided acquisition in Mitchell, a former rugby representative, and fine stamp of a forward. He scored two good tries, and when he gains more experience should go a long way in the code". In round 2 he scored again in a 15–13 loss to North Shore Albions. He was among forwards who were "always going great guns". His try came when he "burst through in a 10 yards dash and went over". Overall he was one "of the best forwards" for Richmond. Mitchell was then named in the Auckland Māori squad to play Auckland Pākehā on 12 May despite having no Māori heritage. He did not take the field for them on game day but did go on to play for them later in the season. Then in a 24–6 win over City Rovers he "showed up in the Richmond forwards". The Herald said that he, Hermes Hadley, and Leo Davis were the best of the Richmond pack.

On 3 May, Mitchell scored three tries in Richmond's 55–15 win over Marist at Carlaw Park. The Herald identified Mitchell and McLeod as notable Richmond players in the match. The Herald also reported positively on Mitchell's performance and adaptation to rugby league. The following week they played their match against Newton at Fowld's Park in Morningside to raise money for the King George V Memorial Fund. The ground was in a "wretched state" with Richmond winning 15–9. The Herald highlighted Mitchell's ball-carrying and his involvement in a passing movement that led to a Richmond try. The newspaper named Mitchell, Bill Telford and Harold Tetley among Richmond's leading forwards. Then in a 15–6 win against Ponsonby "forwards like Mitchell and Tetley were opening up the play continually from the loose". With "Mitchell… the outstanding forward on the ground".

===== Auckland selection =====
Mitchell's form was such that he was selected in the Auckland team to play Taranaki on 9 June at Carlaw Park. He was named in the second row alongside Jack Brodrick with Steve Watene at lock. In the second row for Taranaki was Lex Lewis and G Yates. Auckland won the match 27–10.

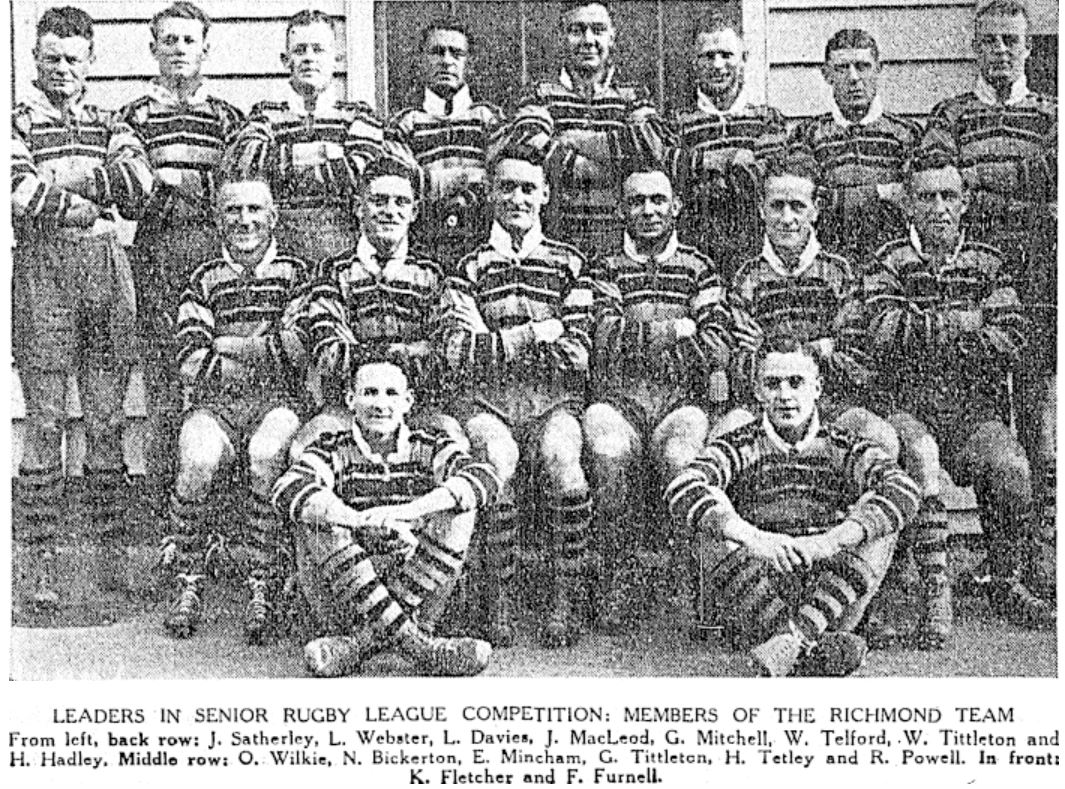
Richmond Rovers, winners of the championship for the third time.

Returning to his Richmond side he stood out in a 22–18 win over Manukau on 12 June in the main match at Carlaw Park. He was among "the great battlers in the Richmond pack".

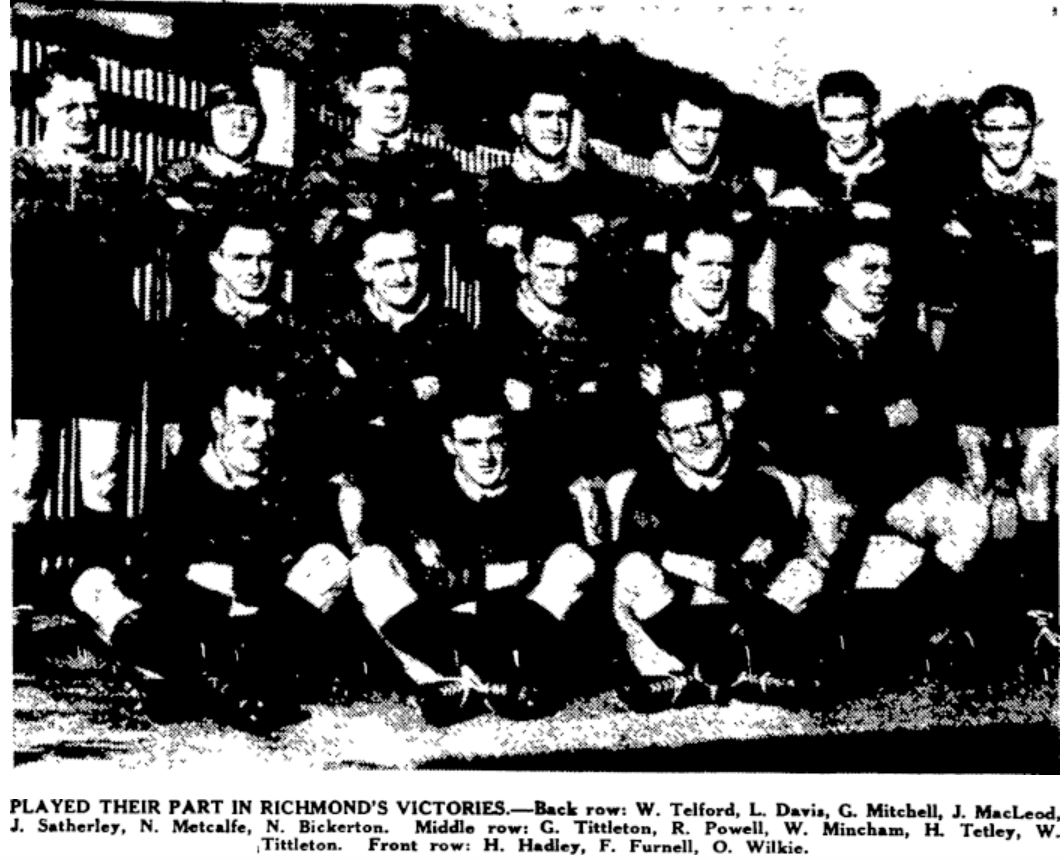
Richmond on 3 July when they played Mount Albert. Mitchell is 3rd from the left in the back row.

He played in another win for Richmond, 15–2 over Mount Albert on 3 July, and then in an 11–9 win against North Shore he "showed up well" and "on form… should win a place in the Auckland representative team". He was involved in an early try when Noel Bickerton went round the blindside and centred a kick past North Shore fullback George Kerr. Mitchell then won the race to the ball and Telford in support scored. Overall he and McLeod were said to be the best of their forwards. Richmond suffered a rare loss on 17 July to Ponsonby by 10 points to 9. Mitchell was the most conspicuous of their forwards along with McLeod and Telford.

Mitchell was named in an 18-man squad for Auckland Māori to play a Waitangi Shield match against Waikato Māori on Wednesday, 21 July. There were ten forwards named. The day before the game he was named to start with Jack Brodrick in the second row. In wet conditions at Carlaw Park the Auckland (Tāmaki) Māori side won 28 to 6. There was no mention of Mitchell in the brief match descriptions with the front row forwards being among the only ones spoken of. He likely played for Richmond the following Saturday against City, but then it was mentioned when the Possible and Probable trial sides for the New Zealand team that he was on the injured list. Australia were about to tour New Zealand and play two tests and a tour match in between against New Zealand Māori. It is likely he was fit to play the next weekend as he was named in the Richmond squad to play Manukau on 31 July.

===== New Zealand Māori v Australia =====
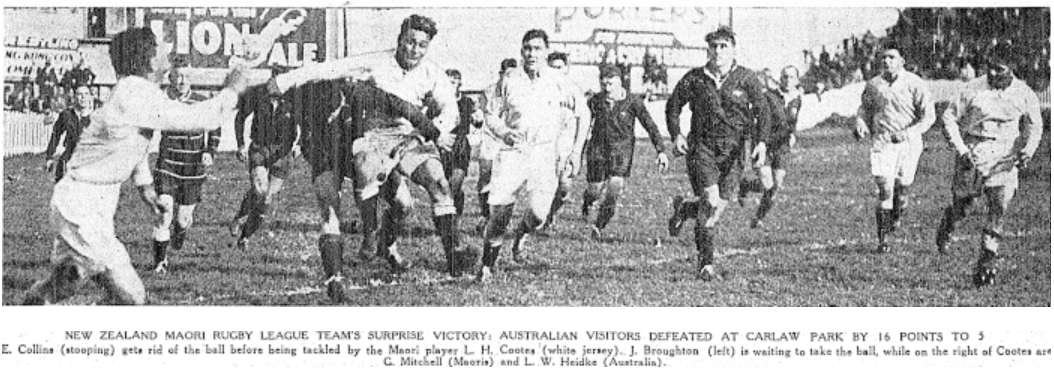
Mitchell (centre) looming in support of Len Cootes and Joe Broughton.

On 10 August a squad of 17 was named for New Zealand Māori for their match against Australia. There were eight forwards named with two to be omitted.

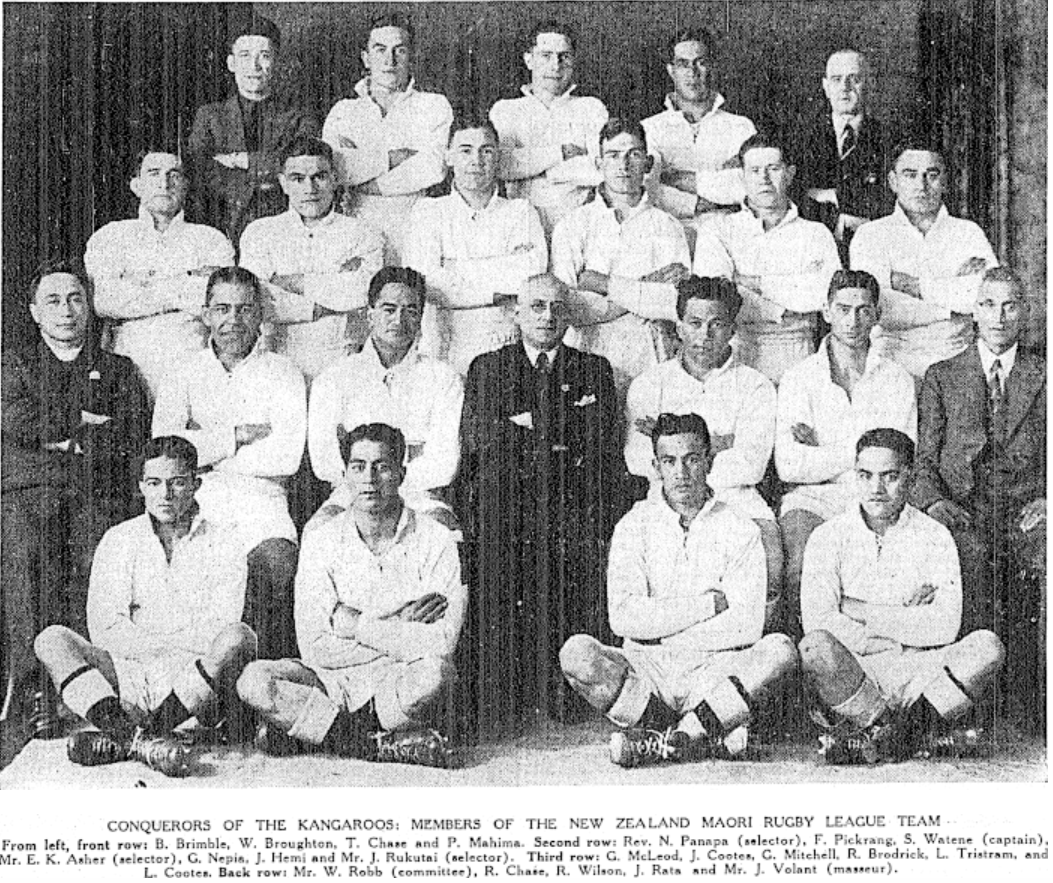

The New Zealand Māori side to play on match day included Mitchell in the second row with Jack Brodrick and Steve Watene at lock. In the Australian second row was Edward Collins, and Gordon McLennan with Frank Curran. Before a crowd of over 10,000 at Carlaw Park on 11 August the New Zealand Māori side caused an upset with a 16–5 win. The weather was described as "beautifully fine" and the ground in a "fair condition". It was a highly creditable victory for the Māori side as Jack Hemi carried an injury into the game and went off in the first half, came back on at halftime but limped throughout the match. While Joe Cootes received a bad cut over his eye and was bandaged heavily and eventually persuaded by the referee to go back to the dressing room leaving them a man short. Of the forwards it was said "Jack McLeod's hooking of the ball was first class, and Watene, Brodrick, Mitchell and the Cootes brothers (Joe and Len) all played solidly. The side was helped in that it was not the best Australian side they could put out and most had not played for 4 weeks and had spent days in Rotorua and Ngaruawahia as visitors. Towards the end of the match with the Māori side leading 14–5 McLeod and Mitchell led their forwards on to attack as they pressed the Australian line. And shortly after George Nēpia kicked a penalty over to extent the score.

Mitchell returned to Richmond in a 30–24 loss to Marist which meant the championship would go down to the final round. McLeod was their best forward and Mitchell and Jack Satherley "also worked hard throughout". Richmond now only had a one-point lead in the championship ahead of Mount Albert and Marist. On 28 August in round 14 Mount Albert and Marist both won their respective games however Richmond beat Newton Rangers 30–9 in the main match for a third consecutive championship. "McLeod and Mitchell were ever ready to chime into passing bouts and send out a long pass from the loose…". With the championship secure Richmond faded somewhat, losing in round 1 of the Roope Rooster knockout competition to City with Mitchell in the side. He was however not included in their loss in the Phelan Shield a week later. Richmond had one more match in the season, the Stormont Shield match for the winner of the championship and winner of the Roope Rooster. Their opponent was Marist with the match on 2 October. Marist won 12 points to 5. The Richmond forwards played much better than their backs and "Mitchell, the former Manawatu player, was the outstanding figure in the Richmond forwards". The Herald said that Mitchell, Hermes Hadley, and Telford were the most prominent.

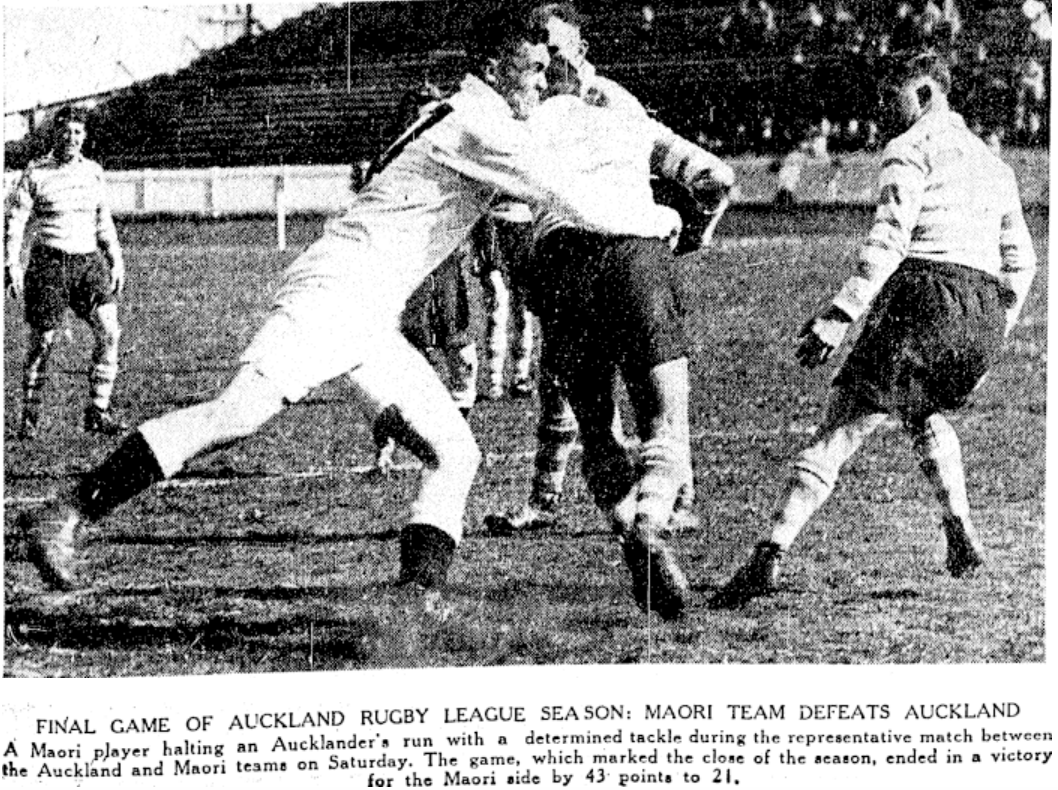
Mitchell making a tackle.

With the club season at an end Mitchell was selected in the New Zealand Māori squad to play Auckland Pākehā on 9 October. The New Zealand side won 43–21 against an understrength opponent with Mitchell scoring two tries. According to the Auckland Star he "gave a brilliant exhibition of loose forward play". The Herald wrote that "Brodrick, Mitchell and Tristram's "excellent play" "was a feature of the game". Just before halftime "Mitchell broke away and Nēpia gained much ground before passing to Brodrick who scored to make it 13–8. Then nearing the end of the game Mitchell crossed for both of his tries. In further comments during the week the Herald said that "Brodrick, Mitchell, McLeod and Tristram played dashing games and were frequently a thorn in the side of the Auckland team" and that "the best was seen of Mitchell, who has had more than his share of injuries this season. The Richmond forward has only to repeat this form next season to win a place in the New Zealand team to visit Australia". Early in the following year the Feiling Old Boys club in the Manawatu acknowledged the good performance of Mitchell in the rugby league code when they wrote in the annual report that "George Mitchell did well in league circles in Auckland".

=== 1938 Non Playing, 1939 continuation with Richmond ===
Curiously there was no mention of Mitchell in either rugby league or rugby union anywhere in New Zealand in 1938. The only plausible reasons is that he was taking time off to recover from injuries or that he had returned for the year to the Manawatu area where rugby league was not played. If he had chosen to play rugby union he would have needed to be reinstated to the sport by the authorities. On 1 April 1939 Mitchell was named in the Richmond side for their opening round match with City Rovers. Richmond won 15–14 with Mitchell scoring a first half try when he "sailed across" after a good handling movement. Mitchell was prominent throughout along with Alf Broadhead. On 10 April Richmond played a touring Sydney XIII side made up of club players from several NSWRL teams. Richmond had a fine record against touring club sides from Sydney in the 1930s and won the game 17–16 with Mitchell scoring two of their three tries. He was "outstanding in the Richmond forwards" along with Mervyn Devine. The Herald wrote that "early in the game Richmond attacked and Mitchell carried Jim Quealey over the line to take the ball off the visitors' five eighths and score an easy try". Later in the half Maurice Potter threw a forward pass to Mitchell and a try was lost when he should have passed to the supporting backs. During the half he and Wally Tittleton "impressed with strong runs well into the visitors' territory". He was then involved in a 70-yard movement with other Richmond forwards. In the second half with the score 12–8 Jack McLeod and Hermes Hadley "headed the Richmond forwards, and from the loose Mitchell snapped up, to race across for a good try". In comments on the game it was said that "a feature of the game was the brilliant forward play of G. Mitchell. He was in every attacking movement, and handled the ball with the ability of a back. His form has only to be continued to assure him of a place in the New Zealand team". After the game the captain of the touring side, Ray Stehr said "your Richmond team plays the only type of football that will succeed and they have some great forwards in Devine, Mitchell, and McLeod. They should be a wonderful success in England".

A depleted Richmond missing five regular players suffered a 7–0 loss to North Shore on 22 April. For Richmond, "Mitchell was the outstanding forward". They lost again to Mount Albert the following weekend 9–0 with "McLeod, Mitchell, and Devine the best forwards". Richmond had a bye and then beat Manukau 15–5 on 13 May. Mitchell scored a try and along with McLeod played well. The Herald wrote that "Mitchell was a tower of strength". In Round 7 Richmond played Papakura at their ground at Prince Edward Park in Papakura and won 23–17. Mitchell scored two tries and he, Hermes Hadley, and Jack McLeod were "the best of the Richmond forwards". The game was notable for the debut in the five eighths for Richmond of All Black, Dave Solomon. The Herald reported that the game was "one of the most brilliant of the code seen locally and was played before a large attendance" with Richmond only overcoming Papakura towards the end. They said Mitchell and McLeod were their best forwards and they were up against Harold Milliken, another All Black who had switched codes. The Franklin Times newspaper in a description of the play said that Mitchell's first try came after "hard play" on the Papakura line "resulted in Mitchell forcing his way across the line" which gave them a 17–14 lead. Then with the score 17–17 "Richmond broke away and carried play right down to Papakura's line for Mitchell to score". During the following week the Herald wrote an article about who was showing form in the Auckland club competition this season and Mitchell was named along with 17 other forwards from the 9 senior sides. They also named him in their suggested Auckland XIII. The following weekend Richmond lost to Pnonsonby 14–10 with Mitchell, Merv Devine, and McLeod "the best of the Richmond pack". Mitchell was injured just before the first half ended and had to leave the field, replaced by Stan Broadhead. The Herald said that he was the best of the forwards until his retirement. Due to his injury Mitchell was unable to play for the Auckland Māori team against Auckland Pākehā on 28 May, and was also unavailable for Richmond's games against Newton on 3 June and their catchup match with Marist two days later on Monday, 5 June. He had recovered enough to be named in their side to play City on 10 June. He played and Richmond won 8–0 and was said to be "easily the best of the forwards".

The Herald wrote another piece on players showing real form with representative selection in mind and said that Mitchell along with Clarrie Petersen (Ponsonby) and Martin Hansen (Mount Albert) were standing out as the best locks. He was then named in the Auckland Māori squad to play South Auckland. The match was played at Huntly but there was no report of any scoring or other comments on the game. In a 26–14 win against Marist on 17 June he was one of their forwards who was "hard to stop". In Round 12 the following weekend Richmond were beaten 9–8 by North Shore in the main game at Carlaw Park. In a beaten pack Mitchell, McLeod, and Devine "held their own". The Herald singled him out as "being the pick of their forwards". In an 11–6 loss to Mount Albert on 11 July Mitchell and McLeod were the best of their forwards.

==== Representative Matches ====
With the representative season in full arrival Mitchell was chosen for the New Zealand Possibles side to play on 8 July. The Herald wrote that he was a surprise omission from the North Island team to play the South Island on the same day. P Stanaway from Wellington was selected instead. They said that Mitchell "was looked upon as a certainty for the North Island team. His selected position in the New Zealand Possibles side was in the second row, not his "specialist" 3rd row/lock position. Mitchell was partnered with Ross Jones in the second row with Edgar Morgan at lock. While they were opposed by the back trio of Jack McLeod, R. Barnard (Canterbury), and Clarrie Petersen. The Probables side won the game 31 to 17 with Gunning and Petersen shining in the forwards for the Probables. While the Herald wrote that "Mitchell, the big Richmond forward, was another to make a fine impression in the opposing pack, and was the inspiration of most of the Possibles' forward movements, beside opening up the play at every opportunity"... and "Mitchell was the outstanding forward of the Possibles' pack...". Three days later on 11 July he played in a second round of New Zealand trial matches at Carlaw Park. This time he was in the Probables side with Ross Jones once more, with W Bellamy (Canterbury) at lock. In the Possibles loose forwards were Mervyn Devine, Walter Cameron, and Edgar Morgan. His Probables side won 27–18 with the Auckland Star writing "the big Aucklanders, Mitchell and Jones, were prominent in the Probables' pack...". He scored a try in the first half when "J. Clark and Jack Satherley raced away "and from a scramble, Mitchell scored". He was replaced at halftime by Gunn.

===== New Zealand selection =====
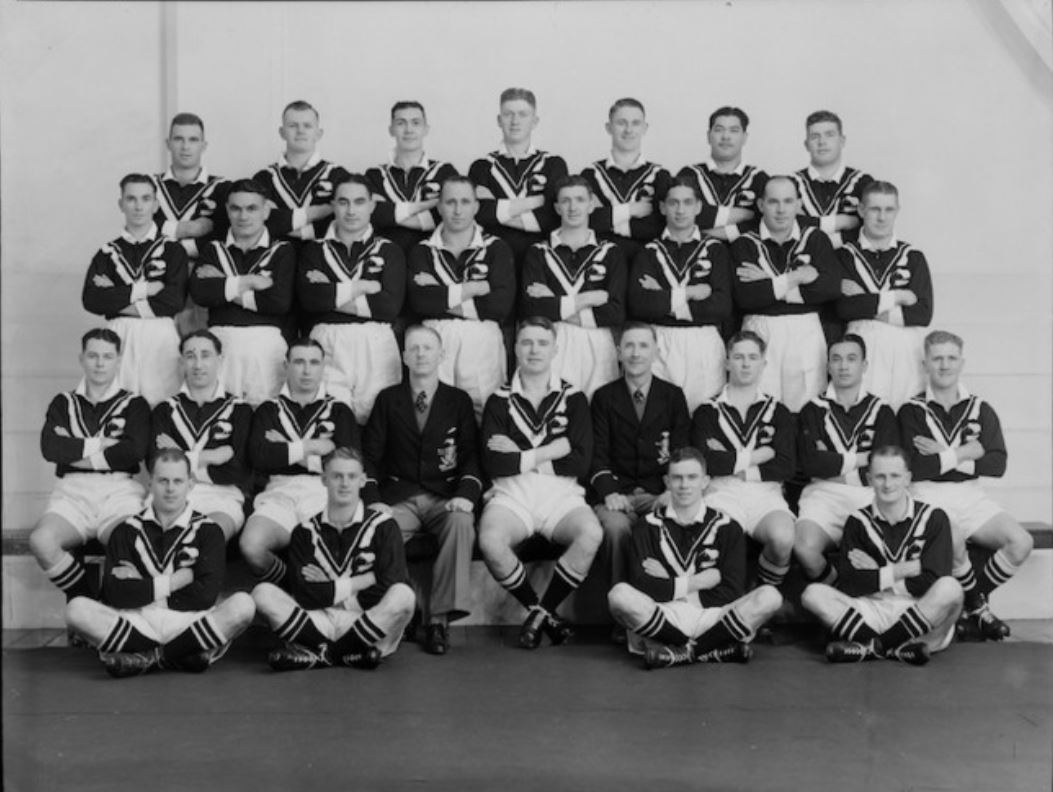
Mitchell is in the back row, third from the left.

That evening the selectors named 8 players for the New Zealand team to tour England with another 10 to be added the following day after further deliberation. Mitchell was not one of the 8 named but after "six hours of deliberation" Thomas McClymont, Jack Redwood, and Jim Amos named him in an additional ten with 8 more to be named the next day. He was chosen as a second row forward along with Ross Jones, Harold Milliken, Pita Ririnui, and George Bellaney. The Herald in a brief sketch of the players wrote of Mitchell "G. Mitchell. 14st, 7lb., Auckland, is a former Wairarapa Rugby representative, and is one of the best loose forwards in the game. Speed and good handling has been a feature of his play with the Richmond club". In a short piece in the Lake Wakatip Mail following the cancellation of the tour it was said "George Mitchell, the Richmond forward, a member of the New Zealand Rugby League team, which cancelled its tour of England and returned to the Dominion owing to the war, is the first to represent Rarotonga in international sport (says the 'New Zealand Observer'). Rarotonga, in the Cook Group, is a dependency of New Zealand. George came to the Dominion as a small boy and was educated at the Feilding Agricultural High School. He formerly represented Manawatu at rugby union".

On Saturday, 22 July a parade of junior players in honour of the Auckland players chosen for the tour was held at Carlaw Park. The programme included short speeches. Mitchell would have had the opportunity to play one last game for Richmond on the same day against Manukau but sat the game out as did many of the other Auckland-based players. Then on 24 July a farewell dance was held at the Peter Pan Cabaret in Auckland for the team and they were presented with their ties.

On 26 July the Auckland members were farewelled at Auckland Train Station by family and supporters as they departed for Wellington.

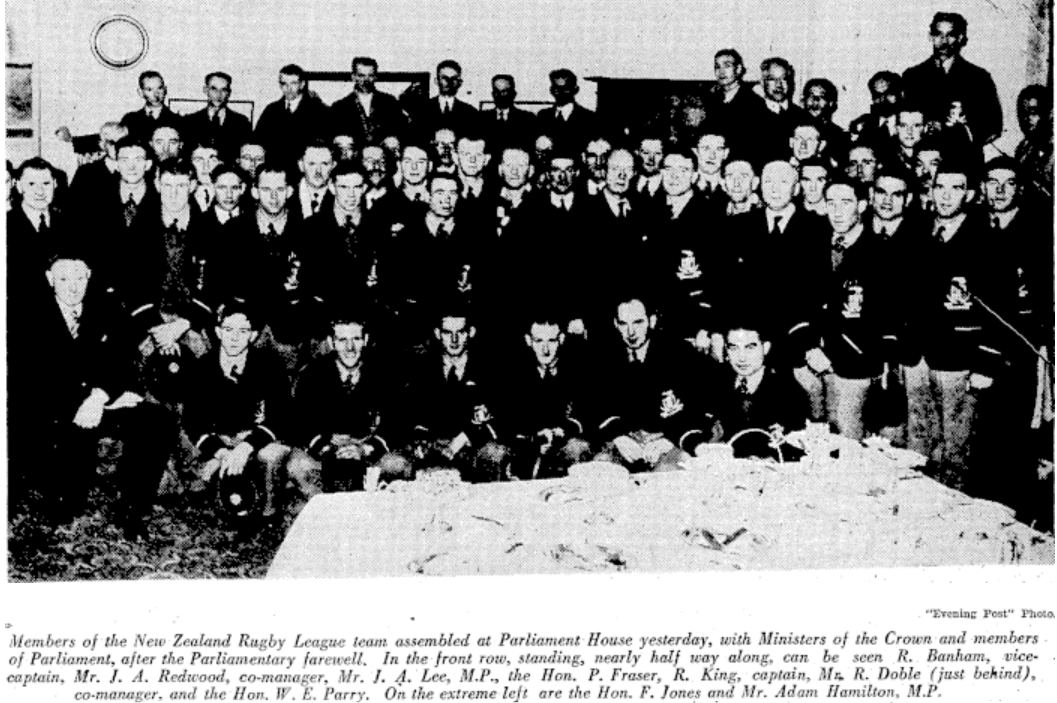
The New Zealand team at a farewell function held in the Parliament Buildings.

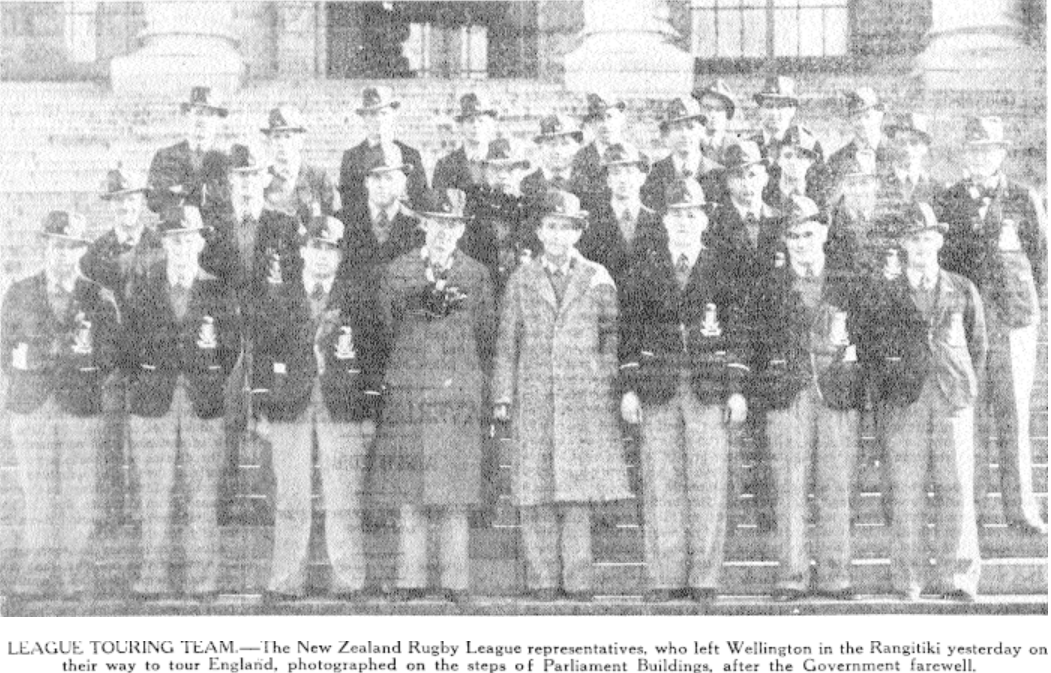
The New Zealand side on the steps of Parliament following their farewell function.

On the morning of the 27th the team and management attended a morning tea in the Parliament Buildings with "good wishes extended to the Kiwis, by Deputy-Prime Minister, the Hon. Peter Fraser, who expressed hope that they would have a successful tour".

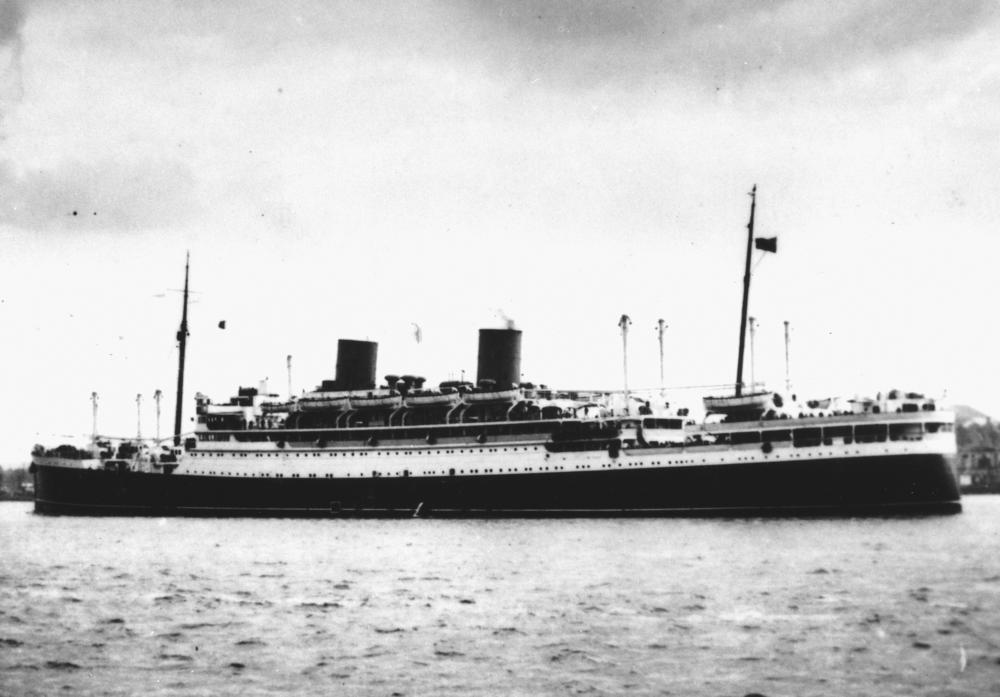
StateLibQld 1 170635 Rangitiki (ship)

The team departed Wellington for London on board the RMS Rangitiki in Tourist Class on Friday 28 July.

It was intended for the tour to consist of 23 matches in England including three tests and then six or seven matches in France however the tour was to be cut very short due the outbreak of World War 2. The war which would ultimate cost Mills his life. The first match of the tour was against St Helens on 2 September. New Zealand won 19 points to 3 at Knowsley Road before 4,000 spectators. A day later, on 3 September Britain declared war on Germany which effectively ended the tour. The second match against Hull Kingston Rovers scheduled for 7 September was cancelled as arrangements were hurriedly made to get the New Zealand side home.

In a letter from managers Jack Redwood and R. Doble they said after war broke out the team had to stay at Beechwood House, Harrogate in the north of England "under the insistence of the English authorities. The players went on A.R.P. (Air Raid Precaution) work, filling and stacking sandbags, and had agreed to keep together under the circumstances". The team had "experienced one air-raid scare at Harrogate" in Yorkshire. They later moved to a different city and the letter concluded "we hope to see you soon. The boys are disappointed at the turn in events, but are happy and well". They managed to organise a match against Dewsbury on 9 September just prior to their departure. New Zealand won 22–10 at Crown Flatt (Dewsbury) before a crowd of 6,200. The team then returned to New Zealand on board the same liner which took them to England, the RMS Rangitiki.

On 26 October a dinner was held for the returning players from the tour, arranged by the Auckland Rugby League ladies' committee. It took place at the Station Hotel. Earlier in the month the Richmond club held an end of season Dinner and Dance which Mitchell attended.

=== 1940 (Richmond and Auckland Māori) ===
The following year in 1940 Mitchell carried on for Richmond. He played 21 matches, scoring 8 tries, while his only representative games were two matches for Auckland Māori. With the war now well under way the opportunity for representative matches was more limited. once more. The Auckland Rugby League senior competition began with preliminary round matches to test the strength of the various sides. Mitchell played in their opening game on 6 April which was an 8–8 draw with Marist at Carlaw Park. He was "outstanding" in the forwards. The first match of the championship on 20 April saw Richmond trounce Papakura 56–2 on Carlaw Park #2 with Mitchell scoring one of their 12 tries. He was "a shining light" along with Devine, Hadley, and Metcalfe. And was "always prominent". In an 11–6 loss to Newton in round 2 the "best Richmond forwards were Devine, Hadley and Mitchell…". In round 3 Richmond beat North Shore 15–12 with Mitchell scoring one of their tries. The Auckland Star said Devine and Mitchell "stood out" on the Richmond side. Then in round 5 on 18 May Richmond defeated City 19–8 in the main match at Carlaw Park with Mitchell among the "hardest workers" in their forwards.

==== Auckland Māori v Auckland Pākehā ====
Mitchell was selected for Auckland Māori for their match against Auckland Pākehā on 8 June for the James Carlaw Memorial Trophy. The Māori side lost 10–7 before a crowd of 6,000. Mitchell was in the second row with Pita Ririnui. The pair of them were said to be "the pick of the forwards" for the Māori side. Mitchell missed the match for Richmond the following weekend against Mount Albert but played again against Marist on 22 June. He then scored a try in a 32–2 victory over Papakura in round 11. The Herald wrote that "the best forward on the ground was Mitchell, whose excellent handling and straight running were features of the game". His good form continued in an 18–7 win against Newton where he "stood out in a solid pack" and "was the outstanding player". In a preview of Richmond's round 12 game against North Shore the Auckland Star said that Richmond "have a virile pack, with two outstanding players in Mitchell and Devine". Richmond won 18–13 in what was the 3pm game on the number one field before a crowd of 7,000.

He scored two tries in Richmond's 22–8 defeat of City Rovers in round 14. And was among the best of a hard-working set of forwards. Richmond beat Ponsonby 10–6 and Marist 13–5 on 10 and 17 August to secure the Fox Memorial championship. They then played a match with the winners of the Waikato Rugby League competition, Huntly South on 24 August at Carlaw Park. With 4,000 in attendance the visiting side won 10–5 with their forwards getting "the measure of the Richmond forward's". It was remarked that "Mitchell, [Leo] Davis, and Jack McLeod offered the stoutest opposition in the forwards".

During the week Mitchell was named in the Auckland Māori team to play Auckland Pākehā for the second time in the season for the 31 August match. Once again he was alongside Pita Ririnui with Jack Tristram at lock. In the opposition loose forwards were Harold Milliken (a former All Black), and Joseph Gunning as second rowers, and Ted Scott at lock. Auckland Māori were defeated again this time by the larger margin of 27 points to 6 before a crowd of 5,000 at Carlaw Park. The Māori forward pack was "superior in the loose" but was not able to get their backs much ball from the scrums. Mitchell and Ririnui once again "stood out prominently".

Richmond were then entering the later stages of the season. After winning the championship, they joined the Roope Rooster knockout competition, and on the 21st of September, they beat Papakura 27–13, with Mitchell scoring a try, and being one of the "good workers in the forwards" with John Crookall and Merv Devine. Richmond then won the final against Ponsonby a week later 31 to 7, with Mitchell scoring two of their seven tries. He "gave an outstanding display among a splendid set of forwards. He was in most of the back movements, and his first try was a fine effort". His final game of the season, was the Stormont Shield match with North Shore. North Shore caused an upset, winning 15–10 before 5,000 spectators on the 5th of October. The Auckland Star said that "Richmond had a fine trio of forwards in Devine, Mitchell and McLeod", and the Herald singled him out saying he "played a splendid game".

=== 1941 Richmond, Auckland, and Auckland Māori ===
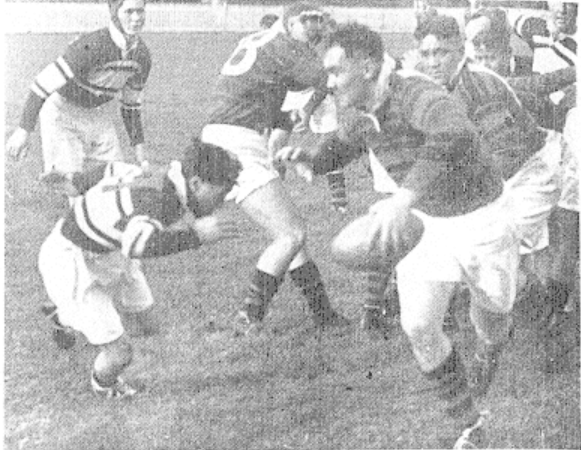
George Mitchell with the ball

The 1941 year saw Mitchell play 20 games for Richmond, scoring six tries, and a game for the Auckland representative side and another game for Auckland Māori. It was only the second time he had represented Auckland with the first coming in his debut season of rugby league in 1937. Their opening game of the season was a preliminary round game against Manukau on 19 April at Carlaw Park. Richmond won 24–17 with a photograph of Mitchell running with the ball in one hand appearing in the New Zealand Herald. His next game was in round 1 of the Fox Memorial championship against Ponsonby on 3 May.Ricmond won 15–12 with Mitchell one of the forwards who "battled gamely". Then in a 27–5 round 2 win over Marist he, along with Leo Davis and Alf Broadhead "were most prominent". On 24 May in the main match at Carlaw park, Mitchell scored a try in a 13–5 win against City. The Auckland Star wrote a short piece on him titled "G. Mitchell Stands Out" and which said "one of the best Richmond forwards against City was G. Mitchell, who is maintaining the good form which won him a place in the 1939 New Zealand team which went to England. Unlike some of the forwards in the code, Mitchell does a full share of work in the hard, set scrum play, and in the open work his play was marked by intelligent backing up. He fitted well into the Richmond scheme of infiltration play, and was prominent all the day". The Herald also noted that he "impressed in the forwards". Richmond followed up with another win, 12–7 over North Shore in round 4. Playing in his usual position of second row, "amid excitement Richmond, with Mitchell leading the forwards, fought its way to the Shore end, and there [Charles] Webb kicked another penalty goal to level the scores" at 7–7. He was "a great toiler in the forwards". The Auckland Star once again highlighted Mitchell's play with a piece titled "A Fine Pair" which said "two of the Richmond forwards, who were outstanding in the match against North Shore, were L. Davis and G. Mitchell. The former came in the front last season in play up to representative standard, and this season is again in great form. Mitchell's play is marked by consistency and his speed and weight make him a fine packman". He was absent from their next game against Papakura on 7 June along with Dave Solomon but Richmond still won 32–4 with young winger Alan Sayers scoring a record seven tries on the wing. After 5 wins to open the championship Richmond suffered their first defeat, 17–14 in an upset to Newton. Trailing 15–8 in the second half the Richmond forwards "hammered their way through to the Newton end and Mitchell swept out a long pass to send [John] Crookall in to score. He was said to have been "one of the best performers in the forwards".

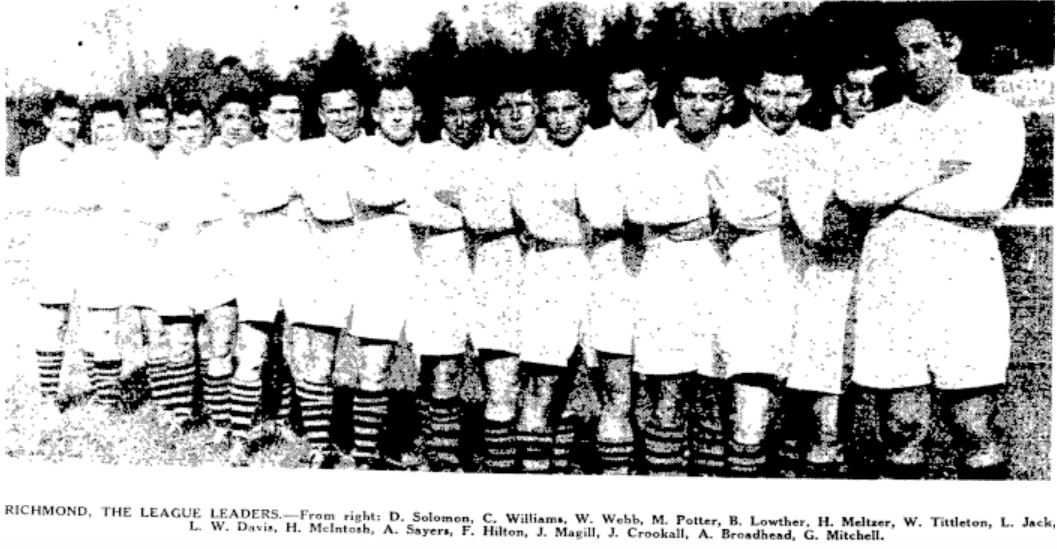

They then had another loss the following week to Mount Albert by 13 to 8, with "Mitchell and Crookall the best of the forwards". Richmond beat Manukau 9–7 in round 9 and Mitchell was once again one of the "most impressive".

==== Auckland Selection ====
Mitchell was named in the Auckland representative side to play South Auckland on 12 July at Carlaw Park. He was selected in the second row. It was Auckland's first representative fixture since the outbreak of the war. In the previous season only the Auckland Māori and Auckland Pākehā teams had played matches due to travel restrictions and needing to get permission from the authorities to leave Auckland. Mitchell was chosen to play in the second row with Hawea Mataira, with Clarrie Petersen at lock. While the opposing second rowers were George Moyes and D McGilp. Auckland won the game 25–14 before a crowd of 9,500 which included acting Prime Minister, the Hon. W. Nash, and Hon. P.C. Webb. Mitchell scored one of their five tries. He was "always up with the backs, and his try was a brilliant effort". Also during the first half J McArthur at halfback made "a fine run, passed to Mataira, to Mitchell, and Butler scored his second try". In the second half "Auckland pressed home good play by [Dave] Solomon, and Mitchell scored a fine try" "in loose play".

Returning to the Richmond team, Mitchell scored another try in a 21–18 win against Ponsonby in round 11. In the first half "the Richmond forwards led by Mitchell, battled their way to the Ponsonby end and McIntosh got across to score". His try levelled the scores in the second half. Another win followed the next week, 19–9 over Marist. Early in the first half "Mitchell, Broadhead, Solomon and Sayers handled, and the latter raced over. Later in the first half Richmond were having the better of the play and "Mitchell sent McIntosh over at the corner" to make the lead 16–9. He was amongst the try scorers again on 2 August in a 12–8 loss to City in the main match at Carlaw Park. The Herald wrote that he was their "best forward". Against Papakura Mitchell had one of the best try scoring games of his career scoring three tries, though the team scored 12 in a 46–8 win in round 13 of the championship. He opened the scoring when he went "across alongside the posts from a loose forward rush". In the second half he "picked up a loose kick by Papakura, passed to [Bernard] Lowther, who in-passed to Mitchell for the latter to score near the corner". Mitchell took a rare kick at goal with the conversion attempt and missed. Shortly after the ball went to Mitchell from a scrum where "he cut through fast to score in a good position". After the game it was said that "Mitchell was the best forward on the ground".

Mitchell was named in the Auckland side to play South Auckland on 6 September at Davies Park in Huntly but he did not play in the game. He was replaced in the loose forwards by Vic Barchard. He traveled with the Richmond team the following weekend to play against Miramar at the Basin Reserve in Wellington. Miramar had won the Wellington club championship. In steady rain on a muddy field before a crowd of 3,000, the Miramar side won 12–8. Among the Richmond forwards "McIntosh, Mitchell, and Potter were always prominent". The Dominion newspaper said that Mitchell and Richmond's other two New Zealand representatives, Wally Tittleton, and Dave Solomon, "gave fine performances".

==== Auckland Māori v Auckland Pākehā ====
Mitchell was selected in the Auckland Māori squad to play Auckland Pākehā on 20 September. The Herald noted that the team would be considerably strengthened by his inclusion along with Hawea Mataira and Solomon. Interestingly Solomon, like Mitchell was not Māori either, being of Fijian heritage. Before a Carlaw Park crowd of 6,000 the Māori side won 21–17 with Mitchell scoring one of their five tries. He was in the second row along with W Mataira (Hawea's brother), with W Briggs at lock. The second row of the Pākehā side was Bruce Graham and Bill Jackson with Clarrie Petersen at lock. Mitchell scored the first try of the game when Ivan Gregory "ran strongly on the right wing, and then in passed to Steve Watene, to Mitchell, the latter going across by the posts to score", with Jack Hemi converting. Midway through the half the Māori side scored again "when [Tommy] Chase, Watene, and Mitchell combined to sweep aside the opposition and send a last pass to get Gregory in to score wide out". Another report said that it was Chase at halfback who had made a break and Watene and Mitchell "raced in support" before Gregory got the ball to cross. In the forwards Wiremu Te Tai "was a great worker… and Watene, H. Mataira and Mitchell also played splendid games".

He returned to the Richmond side to play in their round 2, Roope Rooster knockout match against Marist on 27 September. Richmond lost 11–10. He was "prominent among Richmond's forwards" in the loss. They beat Otahuhu Rovers the following weekend 18–14 in round 2 of the Phelan Shield knockout competition. He and Leo Davis "were the best of the forwards" for Richmond. They then beat City 13–7 in the semi final though Mitchell had to go off "hurt" in the second half. Before going off he "was a tower of strength". He had recovered in time for the final the weekend after with Richmond losing to Mount Albert 8–7. The match was played as a curtain raiser to the Stormont Shield final between Manukau and North Shore which saw 12,000 spectators. For Richmond, Mitchell was one of the "best forwards" with McIntosh and Davis. At the conclusion of the season Mitchell was awarded the Dickson medal for "the most sportsmanlike player" in Auckland senior club rugby league.

=== Rugby union (Motor Transport Pool, Auckland, Military teams) ===
==== 1942 M.T.P., and Auckland ====
In 1942 Mitchell began playing rugby union once more. He was involved in the military and many rugby league players joined the Motor Transport Pool (M.T.P.) side which was included in the Auckland club competition. He played 13 games for them scoring four tries. He also showed good enough form in his old code to be selected for the Auckland representative side on three occasions, as well as playing a game for the Northern Military District side and Auckland Army.

He initially started the year with Richmond, playing for them in a preliminary round game on 18 April against Ponsonby which they won 7–5. Then on 16 May he turned out for M.T.P. in a match against the combined Grafton-Ponsonby side. Mitchell scored a try for his team which won 16–6. Their backs played well with "effective support of the backs by Zimmerman and Mitchell". Frank Zimmerman, like Mitchell had been playing rugby league the season prior. They then beat Garrison 10–8 the following weekend on 23 May. The Auckland Star wrote "the success of M.T.P. with its wealth of rugby league talent proved popular, and as the score indicated there was little between the teams…". For M.T.P. "Hadley, Mitchell, and Zimmerman were the leading forwards". Hadley was Hermes Hadley, a former teammate of Mitchell at Richmond, and was the younger brother of All Black from 1928, Swin Hadley. After the weekends games Mitchell was named in a 21-man Auckland squad to play Waikato on Monday, 1 June if the day was going to be celebrated. With the war being well under way it was not yet known if that would be the case. In the end the day was not celebrated and the game did not take place.

M.T.P.'s next match was against Manukau in the main game at Eden Park on the No. 1 field. M.T.P. won by 14 points to 13 in an "exciting" game with "Mitchell, Zimmerman, and Griffiths showing up in all-round play". Then on 6 June another win followed, 14–9 against Technical Old Boys.

There was very little coverage of the various senior club sports in the newspapers with no specific mention of Mitchell in M.T.P.'s games with Air Force No. 2 (won 13–3), and C.R.O. (won 14–11). They had their first loss on 11 July to Garrison (9–13). For M.T.P. "Mitchell did some fine all round work". He scored a try in a game against Ranfurlys at Sturges Park in Otahuhu on 18 July. M.T.P. won the game 10–3.

===== Auckland selection =====
On 20 July Mitchell was named in the Auckland squad to train "in view of the forthcoming representative fixtures" at the Ponsonby Shed on Dignan Street. They played Waikato on 25 July but Mitchell did not play in this match, most likely instead playing for M.T.P. against Manukau. Mitchell was however then selected for the Auckland game against A Brigade (a military team) on 1 August. He was chosen in the second row along with W.E. Smith, Joseph Gunning (a rugby league player), and D. Ryan. The Auckland Star referred to the opponent as 'Northern Brigade', with Auckland winning 20–9 at Eden Park. The Auckland forwards played particularly well and "Ryan and Mitchell were doing fine work in the tight".

He scored a try in a 12–12 draw with C.R.O. on 8 August at Eden Park in fine weather. He was "prominent in the M.T.P. pack". Mitchell was then chosen by Auckland selector, Fred Lucas to attend a practice on 11 August for the representative sides match with the New Zealand Army Tank Brigade. Mitchell was chosen for the team to play at lock along with Joseph Gunning, a rugby league player who had spent seven years with the Mount Albert senior side. Gunning was with the Garrison club for the 1942 season. In the flanking positions were W Smith and D Ryan. They locks for the New Zealand Tank Brigade side were C.H. Humphrey, and A Pyatt. Auckland won the match 22–3 after leading 11–3 at halftime. In the opposition was a New Zealand rugby league teammate of Mitchell on the 1939 tour, namely Arthur McInnarney. The Auckland Star wrote that in addition to Dave Mills, "Gunning and Mitchell were two other forwards to catch the eye, although the whole pack played well".

The following weekend Mitchell was chosen to play for a Northern Military District representative side against a Divisional Army side. The team was selected by Second-Lieutenant H.D. Brinsden with the game to be played at Eden park on 22 August. Mitchell's side was made up of players from the Auckland area while their opponents were made up of players from outside the city area. His side won on full time when Bob Scott kicked a penalty to win the game 19–17. Mitchell was said to have been "outstanding in line-out work".

Mitchell was named in the Auckland squad to travel to Wellington to play the representative team at Athletic Park on 5 September. He was chosen to be in the starting side however he ultimately did not travel and play in the game. He returned to his M.T.P. club side for a match with Technical Old Boys on 29 August instead. They won 16–8 and had almost secured the Gallaher Shield. The Star wrote "among the forwards Mitchell was again in fine form…". M.T.P. beat A.S.C. 21–9 to increase its competition lead. M.T.P. had just their third loss of the season when they were defeated by Grafton-Ponsonby 19–6 on 12 September. Mitchell scored a try in the loss which was in early showers on a greasy field at Eden Park. He "played well in the forwards" but had to leave the field with an injury late in the game.

Mitchell was selected in the Auckland side to practice for a match against the 3rd NZ Division military side on 19 September. The opponent was composed of players who had returned from service overseas. He was then named to play in the second row again with Joseph Gunning, D Ryan, and J Gilmour. Auckland lost 20–13 though their pack was said to have stood up well, and Mitchell was amongst the best of them.

He was selected in the Auckland Army side to play Pukekohe on 5 October at Eden Park. The Army side won 22 to 9 with Mitchell scoring one of their tries. He, Gunning, Clarrie Petersen, and W Smith "were always prominent in the loose". He was chosen in the Auckland team to play another match against the Divisional team which had beaten Auckland two weeks earlier. The match was to be played in Hamilton but ultimately Mitchell did not play in the game.

Mitchell's last game of the season was actually a rugby league game. He played in an "All Golds" side against a Māori team on 17 October. The All Golds side was more or less the M.T.P. rugby team while the Māori side was dominated by players from the Manukau rugby league side. The All Golds team won 18–9 at Western Springs in a game which was unsanctioned by the authorities with Mitchell scoring two tries. The Auckland Star wrote that "the game was confined mostly to the forwards, and praise for the success of the All Golds pack goes to [Clarrie] Petersen and Mitchell, the well-known M.T.P. players. Mitchell, by his splendid handling, took low passes well, and scored two excellent tries. His tackling was also low and sure". The Herald also said that Mitchell and Petersen "were the best of the forwards".

During the summer Mitchell played cricket for the M.T.P. side, and in a game against R.V. in the Auckland City and Suburban Competition at the Auckland Domain he scored 46 runs in a partnership with 44 year old Len Righton who had been an All Black in 1923–25.

=== 1943 M.T.P. ===
In 1943 Mitchell continued to play for the M.T.P. side in the Auckland club rugby union competition. They lost to Technical Old Boys in a preliminary round game on 1 May by 27 to 11. M.T.P. had lost a large number of its players from the previous season and was predicted to not "be so strong" as the previous year. This turned out to be the case as they lost every game and finished last. Like the previous year there was very little coverage of the games in the main newspapers so it can only be assumed that Mitchell was playing for the side each week through May. His form was obviously good as on 31 May it was reported that Mitchell had been named in the Auckland squad to train to play Waikato on Kings Birthday. When the team to play was named it was said that Mitchell was unavailable. On 5 June Mitchell scored a try and converted it in a 30–8 loss to Garrison. They continued to lose each week throughout June and were struggling on attack with few points scored. In a 40–3 loss to Marist on 3 July Mitchell scored the only points which was from a penalty goal. He was also chosen by Fred Lucas to practice for Auckland's matches against Waikato and Wellington. For the first time in his career Mitchell was taking the goal kicking. In previous years he had only been mentioned on extremely rare occasions as having taken a shot at goal with little success. In a 6–3 loss to Garrison on 10 July he kicked M.T.P.'s lone penalty. Both sides were said to be weakened by some of their players in Whangarei for an Army rugby match.

Mittchell was selected in the Northern Districts military team to play an Army A Division representative side on 17 July at Eden Park. Mitchell was eventually named as an emergency forward replacement and is unlikely to have played. On 24 July Mitchell scored two tries for M.T.P. in a 9–8 loss to Grafton-Ponsonby. One of his tries was converted by Brian Riley, a former New Zealand rugby league representative. They lost to Navy on 7, 14 to 6 August, and then to Manukau on 14 August by 31 points to 6 with Mitchell kicking a penalty. A further loss to Technical Old Boys came on 21 August before they had their only win of the season, though it was a default win over Army.

=== Return to Rugby League ===
==== Difficult Transfer to Ponsonby (1945) ====
In 1944 Mitchell did not play either rugby union or rugby league, instead sitting the season out. In late September he was reported to have registered with the Newton Rangers club, though he likely did not play for them. Then in April 1945 it was reported that Mitchell sought a transfer to the Ponsonby United rugby league club. The Auckland Star wrote "there was considerable discussion at a meeting of the Board of Control of the Auckland Rugby League last evening in connection with a request that George G. Mitchell, the New Zealand league representative, who formerly played for Richmond, should be allowed to play for Ponsonby. The chairman, Mr. J. W. Watson, said that the matter came up as an appeal by the Ponsonby club against a decision by Richmond not to give the necessary permit. Mitchell said that he had been in the Armed Forces for the last three years. For two seasons he played rugby, but he did not play any football last season. He decided to have a spell, in view of getting clearance to play for Ponsonby this season. As he had not played for 12 months he considered that he was entitled to ask for a clearance. Mr. W.R. Dick, secretary of the Richmond club, said that Mitchell required a transfer, and not a clearance. There was, he said, a rule that a player should revert to his club when discharged from the armed forces". The chairman went on to say that the only rule on the book around this matter was vaguely worded, while Mr. D. Wilkie said "it would be a big injustice not to let the player go to another club after standing down twelve months". Mr. Dick then said that they would defer their decision until the following Sunday morning. The New Zealand Herald reporting on the matter said "Mr. R. H. Short, for the Ponsonby club, said a clearance was asked for from the Richmond club and it had been refused. This action, he contended, was contrary to the rules… Mr. W.R. Dick said the Richmond club desired Mitchell's services in the senior team. This had been offered to him at the start of the 1944 season. In answer to the chairman, Mitchell said he did not want to play for any club other than Ponsonby". A week later following the board of control meeting it was announced that Mitchell would be allowed to play for Ponsonby with the chairman "stating that the Richmond club had raised no further objection".

Mitchell made his debut for Ponsonby in a round 3, Fox Memorial match with City Rovers on 28 April. He scored a try in a 19–14 loss on Carlaw Park #2 field. His try came early in the match when he "intercepted to make a dash for it and get across the line to open up the scoring for Ponsonby". He was playing in the second row with future New Zealand representative Travers Hardwick at lock. The following weekend Ponsonby lost to Otahuhu Rovers 17–5, with Hadley, Hardwick, and Mitchell working hard" in the forwards.

On 5 May the Auckland Star wrote a short piece on Mitchell which said "The Ponsonby league team has been reinforced this season by the inclusion of G.G. Mitchell, the Auckland and New Zealand representative forward. Mitchell played rugby at the Feilding Agricultural High School, and later, when playing for Feilding Old Boys seniors he gained Manawatu representative honours. He came north in 1937 and joined the Richmond senior league team. In 1939 he was chosen to go to England with the New Zealand league team which returned to the Dominion after playing two matches. Mitchell did not play football last season, but in the two previous seasons he was a member of the M.T.P. rugby team. Now 30 years of age, he weights 15 stone". On 12 May Ponsonby beat Marist Old Boys 8–7 in the early game on Carlaw Park #1 field. Mitchell, Dick Hull, and Don Mullett "were prominent" in the forwards with Travers Hardwick the best. In Ponsonby's 24–6 victory over Manukau on 26 May "Mitchell, Hull, Hardwick, and [Darcy] Bailey played fine forward games". Brian Nordgren scored three tries and kicked three goals for Ponsonby in his second and final season with them before moving to England to play for Wigan for ten years. Following a 25–7 loss to Richmond, Ponsonby beat Point Chevalier on 16 June by 36 to 15 with Mitchell scoring one of their eight tries.

===== Auckland Māori =====
Following Ponsonby's round 9 win over North Shore on 23 June, Mitchell was named in the Auckland Māori 16 man squad to play Auckland Pākehā. He was then chosen by selector Ernie Asher to play in the second row along with Pita Ririnui, with George Shilton at lock. He scored a try for Auckland Māori in a 19–16 loss on 30 June. Their other try was his second row partner Pita Ririnui who had also gone on the 1939 tour of England with him. The ground was described as being in "fair order after heavy rain, there being only a few muddy patches". In the second half when the Māori side was trailing 2–9 "Ririnui, Mitchell, and [Aubrey] Thompson headed a determined Māori forward rush, which Nurse checked just in time". However the Pākehā side scored two more tries to extend the lead to 17 to 2. The Māori forwards then "rose to the occasion splendidly" with Wiremu Te Tai and George Shilton carrying "the ball on and Mitchell dived over for a good try". The Herald wrote that "a feature of the game was the impressive play of the Maori forwards in the loose, Ririnui stood out as the best forward on the ground, and both Mitchell and Thompson played really fine games".

Returning to Ponsonby for their round 10 game Mitchell scored two tries in a 31–15 win against Marist on the #2 field at Carlaw Park. Ponsonby ultimately finished 3rd in the championship with a 9 win, 5 loss record. In a somewhat arbitrary fashion Auckland Rugby League made up the playoff format as they went along, and on 25 August Ponsonby played Otahuhu in a championship semi final. Ponsonby won 28 to 18 with Mitchell being "prominent in the loose". Ponsonby played in the 'final' on 1 September against Richmond. Ponsonby lost 7–3 in a closely fought match. Late in the second half "Ponsonby carried the ball over the Richmond line on four occasions and Nordgren and Mitchell appeared to touch down. The referee (J. O'Shannessey), however, ruled otherwise". The league then decided that the minor premiers, Otahuhu, should get to play off for the championship and they did so against Richmond on 13 October with Otahuhu winning 11–5.

===== Auckland selection =====
Mitchell was selected in the reserves for Auckland to travel to Wellington on 8 September. Mitchell was then chosen to play for Auckland against South Auckland (Waikato) on 29 September at Davies Park in Huntly. The selectors were Jim Clark, Jack Kirwan, and Dougie McGregor. Auckland won the match 26 to 13 after leading 20–0 at half time.

==== 1946–47 Ponsonby, Auckland ====
Mitchell continued to play for Ponsonby in 1946 and 1947 however the Auckland newspapers are not available online so there is little information on his playing in this period. In 1947 it was reported in the Grey Mouth Evening Star that Mitchell was selected in a New Zealand trial match on 5 July at Carlaw Park. He was alongside C. Hancox, with Allen Laird at lock. The second row for the Probables side was J Mundy and Arthur Gillman both of the West Coast.

== Personal life ==
=== Marriage ===
George Mitchell married Louise Iva Guttenbeil (1909–1984) on 29 March 1939. She had been born in Vava'u, Tonga. The couple predominantly lived in central Auckland and in 1980 were at Tuarangi Road in Grey Lynn which was the suburb where the Richmond rugby league club was based, and neighbours Ponsonby where Mitchell also spent some seasons representing that club side.

=== Death ===
George's wife, Louise died in 1984 in Auckland, aged 73. George Mitchell died on 24 March 1986 in Auckland, aged 71 and was buried two days later on 26 March at Purewa Cemetery. He had been living on Tuarangi Road in Grey Lynn at the time.
