= Bruce Gemmell =

Bruce Gemmell may refer to:

- Bruce Gemmell (rugby union)
- Bruce Gemmell (coach)
