= James Stewart (rugby union) =

- Born: James Douglas Stewart; 3 October 1890 Kaiapoi, New Zealand
- Died: 5 May 1973 (aged 82) Whangārei, New Zealand

Rugby union career
- Position: Wing
Amateur team(s)
Years	Team	Apps	(Points)
1910–1915	City		
Provincial / State sides
Years	Team	Apps	(Points)
1910–1915	Auckland	29	(42)
International career
Years	Team	Apps	(Points)
1913	New Zealand	2	(0)

James Douglas Stewart (3 October 1890 – 5 May 1973) was a New Zealand rugby union player who represented the All Blacks in 1913. His position of choice was wing.

== Career ==
Although born in Kaiapoi, Stewart played for the City club in Whangārei.

He mainly played as a centre.

He represented Auckland between 1910 and 1915.

His two All Black test matches came as a result of two tours being made at once, the All Blacks tour of North America (which he was not selected for) and Australia's tour of New Zealand.

Stewart played in two of the three test matches during the tour. Both of which were played on the wing. He did not score any points as an All Black.

Stewart also played for the North Island against the South in 1914, however he wasn't picked to go on the tour of Australia.
