= Bill Wright (rugby union) =

New Zealand rugby union player (1905–1971)

- Born: William Alexander Wright; 15 December 1905 Auckland, New Zealand
- Died: 19 September 1971 (aged 65) Auckland, New Zealand
- School: Sacred Heart College

Rugby union career
- Position: Halfback
Amateur team(s)
Years	Team	Apps	(Points)
1926–27	Marist		
Provincial / State sides
Years	Team	Apps	(Points)
1926–27	Auckland	4	
International career
Years	Team	Apps	(Points)
1926	New Zealand	0	(0)

William Alexander Wright (15 December 1905 – 19 September 1971) was a New Zealand rugby union player who represented the All Blacks in 1926. His position of choice was halfback.

Wright was educated at Sacred Heart College, where he was a member of the 1st XV between 1922 and 1923.

== Career ==
Wright had played just one first-class game before making his only All Black match.

After the 1926 All Blacks had returned from their tour of New South Wales, the returning party would play a match against the Auckland provincial side.

Wright was named as a reserve for Auckland until an injury to All Black Bill Dalley just before halftime. With no other fit players to use at the halfback position, Wright changed strips and played the second-half of the match for the All Blacks. The match was won by the All Blacks 11-6.

He played 6 matches for Auckland, however two of these were for Auckland B.

== Family ==
Wright was the son of William Wright and Kate Keating.
