= Herman Mattson =

New Zealand rugby union player (1900–1980)

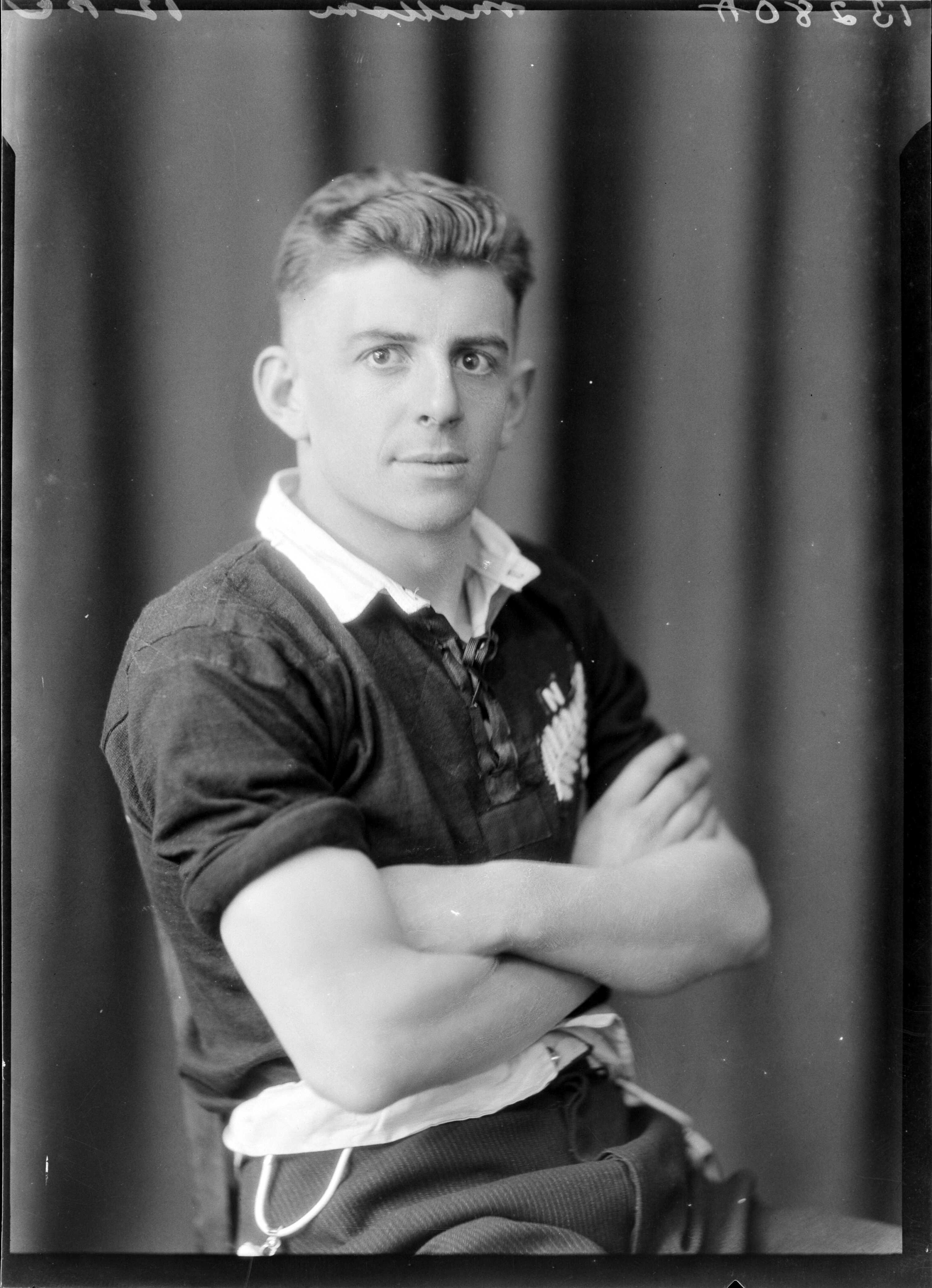
- Mattson in 1925
- Full name: Herman Alfred Mattson
- Born: 4 November 1900 Auckland, New Zealand
- Died: 6 July 1980 (aged 79) Auckland, New Zealand
- Height: 1.75 m (5 ft 9 in)
- Weight: 70 kg (154 lb)
- School: Seddon Memorial Technical College
- Occupation: Banker

Rugby union career
- Positions: Second five-eighth; Three-quarter
Provincial / State sides
Years	Team	Apps	(Points)
1922–1925	Auckland	9	(24)
International career
Years	Team	Apps	(Points)
1925	New Zealand	0	(0)

Herman Alfred Mattson (4 November 1900 – 6 July 1980) was a New Zealand rugby union player. A second five-eighth and three-quarter, Mattson represented Auckland at a provincial level, and was a member of the New Zealand national side, the All Blacks, on their 1925 tour of New South Wales.

== Early life ==
Born in Auckland on 4 November 1900, Mattson was the son of Kate Seagar Mattson and Herman Matthias Mattson. He was educated at Seddon Memorial Technical College, where he passed the Public Service entrance course in English composition and literature in 1916.

== Rugby union career ==
Mattson joined Ponsonby RFC in 1916, and was a member of their club side that won three consecutive junior Auckland championship titles, in 1919, 1920 and 1921. He made his provincial debut for Auckland in 1922, playing in four matches, but he missed the following two seasons due to injury; a knee injury in 1923 and a broken jaw the next year.

In 1925, with none of the members of "The Invincibles" that toured the British Isles and France in 1924–1925 considered for selection, Mattson was picked for the All Blacks team to tour New South Wales after showing good form at club level. He played six matches for the All Blacks on that tour, although troubled by a knee injury, including all three of the games against New South Wales, where Sydney papers described him as "brilliant". He scored his only points for the All Blacks, a try, in the tourists' first match, against Wellington at Athletic Park before their departure for Australia.

After the tour to New South Wales, Mattson played a further five games for Auckland. In a match against Canterbury, he scored four tries, which as of 2024 remains the most tries scored by an Auckland player against Canterbury. The feat has been equalled by Bernie Fraser and Joeli Vidiri, but not surpassed. In total, Mattson scored eight tries in his nine appearances for Auckland.

After playing "several brilliant games on the wing" for Ponsonby in 1925, Mattson temporarily retired from rugby in 1926 because of his old knee injury. After two seasons off, Mattson returned to Ponsonby, but he broke his collarbone in his first reappearance on 28 April 1928 at a match at Eden Park. He retained an interest in rugby, serving as treasurer of the Ponsonby club and inaugural president of the Ponsonby Old Boys' Association. He also coached the Parnell club.

== Later life and death ==
Mattson worked as a banker at the National Bank of New Zealand. Described as having "a rough, gruff exterior and a heart of gold", he was known for his compassionate treatment of less-fortunate customers, including refugees from Europe following World War II. He served on the executive council of the New Zealand Bank Officers' Guild.

Mattson married Florence Mabel Ardern on 30 June 1926. He died in Auckland on 6 July 1980, and was cremated at Purewa Crematorium. His wife died in Queensland, Australia, in 1993.
