= Vivian Wilson (rugby union) =

New Zealand rugby union player (1899–1978)

- Born: Vivian Whitta Wilson; 6 January 1899 Auckland, New Zealand
- Died: 14 October 1978 (aged 79) Auckland, New Zealand
- School: Auckland Grammar School
- Occupation: Surveyor

Rugby union career
- Position: Three-quarter
Provincial / State sides
Years	Team	Apps	(Points)
1916–20, 1923	Auckland		
1921–22	Bay of Plenty		
International career
Years	Team	Apps	(Points)
1920	New Zealand	0	(0)

Vivian Whitta Wilson (6 January 1899 – 14 October 1978) was a New Zealand rugby union player. A three-quarter, Wilson represented Auckland and Bay of Plenty at a provincial level, and was a member of the New Zealand national side, the All Blacks, in 1920. He played seven matches for the All Blacks but did not appear in any internationals.
