= Walter Batty =

New Zealand rugby union player

Walter Batty DCM
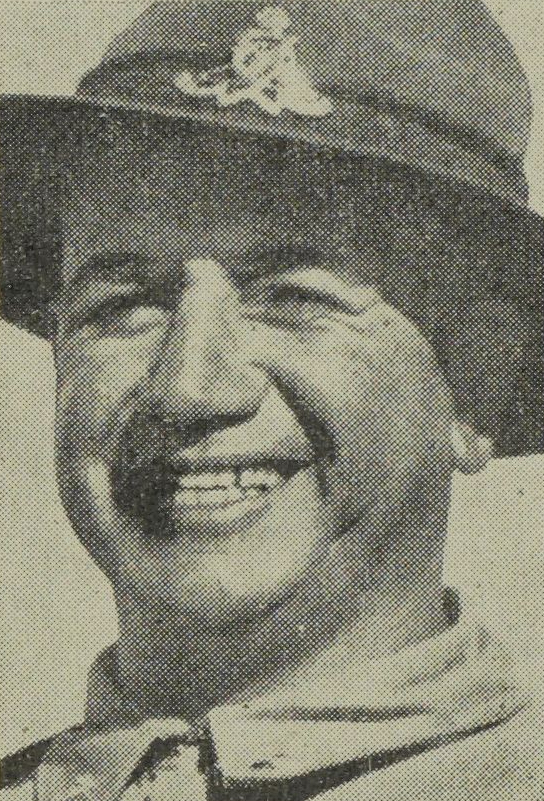
- Batty during World War II
- Born: 1 January 1905; Tonga
- Died: 10 May 1979 (aged 74); Auckland, New Zealand
- Education: Auckland Grammar School
- Occupation: Insurance agent
- Height: 1.80 m (5 ft 11 in)
- Weight: 84 kg (185 lb)

Rugby union career
- Position: Number 8
Provincial / State sides
Years	Team	Apps	(Points)
1924–1932	Auckland	69	
International career
Years	Team	Apps	(Points)
1928–1931	New Zealand	4	(3)

Walter Batty DCM (1 January 1905 – 10 May 1979) was a New Zealand rugby union player. A loose forward, Batty represented Auckland at a provincial level, and was a member of the New Zealand national side, the All Blacks, from 1928 to 1931. He played six matches for the All Blacks including four internationals.

Batty was born in Tonga in 1905, to an English father and a Tongan mother. He was educated at Auckland Grammar School, and was an insurance agent when he enlisted for service during World War II. He saw active service in North Africa and Italy with the 6th New Zealand Field Regiment, and won the Distinguished Conduct Medal during Operation Crusader for actions on 1 December 1941 at Belhamed in Libya.
