= Bruce Gemmell (rugby union) =

- Born: Bruce McLeod Gemmell; 12 May 1950 (age 76) Auckland, New Zealand
- Height: 1.73 m (5 ft 8 in)
- Weight: 76 kg (168 lb)
- School: Auckland Grammar School

Rugby union career
- Position: Halfback
Provincial / State sides
Years	Team	Apps	(Points)
1969–78	Auckland	60	
International career
Years	Team	Apps	(Points)
1974	New Zealand	2	(0)

Bruce McLeod Gemmell (born 18 May 1950) is a former New Zealand rugby union player. He was educated at Auckland Grammar School where he was a member of the 1st XV between 1966 and 1968. A halfback, Gemmell represented Auckland at a provincial level, and was a member of the New Zealand national side, the All Blacks, on their 1974 tour of Australia and Fiji. He played six matches on that tour including two internationals. Gemmell retired from rugby in 1978 because of an ongoing head injury.
