= Lew Hook =

New Zealand international rugby union player

- Born: Llewellyn Simpkin Hook; 4 May 1905 Puni, New Zealand
- Died: 4 August 1979 (aged 74) Auckland, New Zealand
- Height: 1.70 m (5 ft 7 in)
- Weight: 63 kg (139 lb)
- School: Thames High School
- Occupations: Bank clerk; Tobacconist

Rugby union career
- Position: Three-quarter
Provincial / State sides
Years	Team	Apps	(Points)
1925–1930	Auckland	43	
1932–1933	Waikato		
International career
Years	Team	Apps	(Points)
1928–1929	New Zealand	3	(0)

Llewellyn Simpkin Hook (4 May 1905 – 4 August 1979) was a New Zealand rugby union player. Small in stature, at 1.70 metres tall and weighing 63 kg, he played in a range of positions, included at flanker, wing-forward, and anywhere in the backline from first five-eighth to fullback. Hook represented Auckland and Waikato at a provincial level, and was a member of the New Zealand national side, the All Blacks, in 1928 and 1929. He played 12 games for the All Blacks, including one as captain, and appeared in three Test matches.
