= Mac Geddes =

Mac Geddes MC
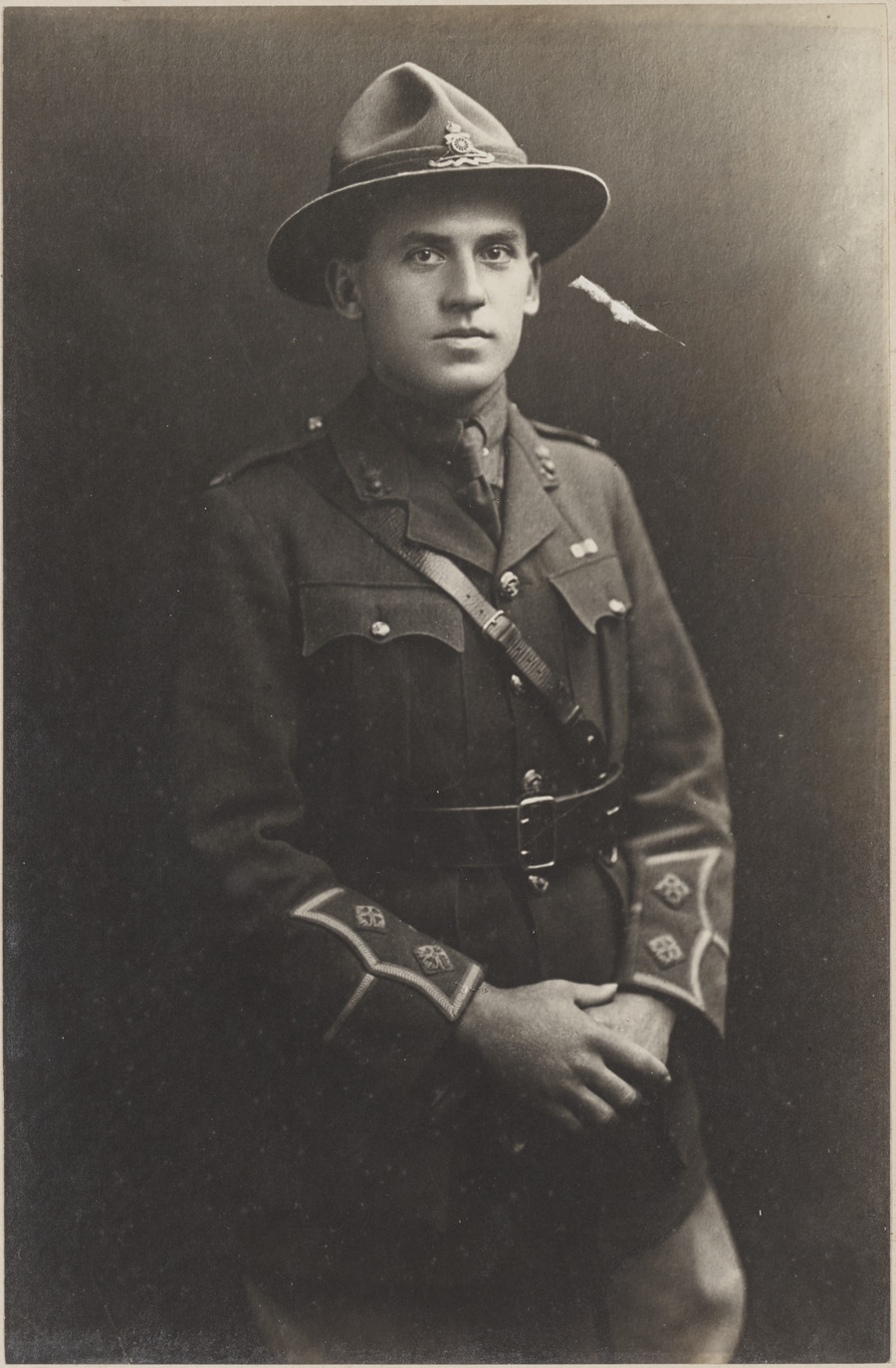
- Born: William McKail Geddes; 21 April 1893 Auckland, New Zealand
- Died: 1 July 1950 (aged 57) Auckland, New Zealand
- Height: 1.79 m (5 ft 10 1/2 in)
- Weight: 81 kg (178 lb)
- School: Auckland Grammar School

Rugby union career
- Position: First five-eighth
Provincial / State sides
Years	Team	Apps	(Points)
1911–14	Auckland	13	
International career
Years	Team	Apps	(Points)
1913	New Zealand	1	(0)

William McKail "Mac" Geddes MC (21 April 1893 – 1 July 1950) was a New Zealand soldier and rugby union player.

== Rugby union ==
Geddes played one test match for the All Blacks in 1913. He played for the Auckland provincial team from 1911 to 1914, and won a total of 13 caps for the side. As well as playing in four Ranfurly Shield matches, he also played in the Auckland side that defeated Australia in 1913. After being selected for the North Island team that same year, he was selected to play for New Zealand – the All Blacks – for their test match against Australia in Dunedin. The match was won by the All Blacks 25–13, but Geddes was subsequently dropped from the team. He continued to play for Auckland in 1914, but did not appear for the All Blacks again.

== Military service ==
Geddes was an artillery officer in the New Zealand Expeditionary Force in World War I. He left New Zealand in 1915 as a second lieutenant, and served in Egypt, France and Belgium. He was awarded the Military Cross in 1917 for actions at Messines. According to his citation, "he displayed the greatest courage in reconnoitring enemy country under heavy shell fire," and that "his daring and resourcefulness contributed in a large degree to the success of [the] artillery." By the end of the war he had attained the rank of major.

== Later life and death ==
In 1935, Geddes was awarded the King George V Silver Jubilee Medal. He died in Auckland on 1 July 1950.
