= Mount Roskill Rugby Football Club =

Rugby football club

Coordinates: 36.9038482696°S 174.746459869°E

Mount Roskill Rugby Football Club is a rugby football club. It has existed as such since it merged with Hillsborough RFC, and was known for much of its life as the Roskill Districts RFC. It merged with Suburbs RFC in November 2016 and now operates as a junior satellite club and has since reverted to its former name; Mount Roskill Rugby Football Club.
