= Len Righton =

- Born: Leonard Stephen Righton; 12 October 1898 Auckland, New Zealand
- Died: 14 February 1972 (aged 73) Auckland, New Zealand
- Height: 1.78 m (5 ft 10 in)
- Weight: 89 kg (196 lb)

Rugby union career
- Position(s): Lock; Loose forward
Provincial / State sides
Years	Team	Apps	(Points)
1922–1925	Auckland		
International career
Years	Team	Apps	(Points)
1923–1925	New Zealand	0	(0)

Leonard Stephen Righton (12 October 1898 – 14 February 1972) was a New Zealand rugby union player. Primarily a lock, Righton represented Auckland at a provincial level, and was a member of the New Zealand national side, the All Blacks, in 1923 and 1925. However, he missed selection for the 1924 "Invincibles" tour. He played nine matches for the All Blacks but did not appear in any internationals.

On 3 August 1927, Righton married Eileen Gladys O'Leary at St Patrick's Cathedral, Auckland. He died in Auckland on 14 February 1972.
