= 1949 Rhodesia vs New Zealand rugby union match =

1949 Rhodesia vs New Zealand
- Event: 1949 New Zealand rugby union tour of South Africa
Rhodesia	New Zealand
(Southern Rhodesia)	(New Zealand)
10	8
- Date: 27 July 1949
- Venue: Hartsfield Rugby Ground, Bulawayo, Southern Rhodesia
- Attendance: 10,000

In 1949, Rhodesia played a rugby union match against New Zealand (colloquially known as the All Blacks) as a part of the 1949 New Zealand rugby union tour of South Africa. The match was played on 27 July 1949 at Hartsfield Rugby Ground in Bulawayo, Southern Rhodesia. The final result was Rhodesia 10–8 New Zealand. As of 2019, this is the only time the All Blacks have been beaten by a non-Test nation and makes Rhodesia one of only eight countries to have won against the All Blacks.

== Background ==
Rugby in Northern and Southern Rhodesia was governed on an all-Rhodesia basis by the Rhodesia RFU but they were treated as a province of South Africa for rugby reasons and their players were eligible for selection by the South African team. In 1949, the All Blacks visited Rhodesia as a part of their tour of South Africa. The New Zealand team's management for the tour had been troubled due to sailing to South Africa on a ship with little space to train, the team not bringing any Māori players due to South Africa's recently introduced apartheid laws and the fact there was no formal tour coach. The team also travelled with only ten capped players and were led by Fred Allen. As a result of there being no Māori players, the All Blacks did not perform their traditional haka before any match in protest with manager Jim Parker explaining "The war cry is a creation of the Māoris and as we have no Māoris with us we are not giving the war cry."

== Match ==
The match was played at Hartsfield rugby ground in front of 10,000 spectators. In the first half, Rhodesia opened the scoring with a try from J.A. Brink after a grubber kick into the All Blacks' in-goal area, which was converted by Ed Karg. In the second half, Rhodesia scored another try by John Morkel stealing the ball from the New Zealand fullback Jack Goddard and passing it to Claude Jones for the second try which Karg also converted. The All Blacks responded with a try from Eric Boggs, which was converted by Goddard. They then scored another try from scrum-half Bill Conrad which Goddard was unable to convert. Rhodesia then continued with attacking tactics and held out for a 10–8 victory.

=== Details ===
27 July 1949

Rhodesia (Southern Rhodesia)	10–8	New Zealand
Try: Brink, Jones; Con: Karg (2)		Try: Boggs, Conrad; Con: Goddard

Hartsfield Rugby Ground, Bulawayo
Attendance: 10,000

Rhodesia	New Zealand

FB	15	J.D. Pretorius
RW	14	J.A. Brink
OC	13	R.A. van Schoor
IC	12	W.E. Brune
LW	11	W.D.B. Kidd
FH	10	E.U. Karg
SH	9	W. Viljoen
N8	8	J.C. Morkel (c)
BF	7	C. Jones
OF	6	J.M. du Rand
RL	5	A.H. Birkin
LL	4	M.C. Prinsloo
TP	3	I.W. Brownlee
HK	2	P.M. Grieves
LP	1	E.J. Painting

FB	15	J.W. Goddard
RW	14	E.G. Boggs
OC	13	G.W. Delamore
IC	12	F.R. Allen (c)
LW	11	P. Henderson
FH	10	J.C. Kearney
SH	9	W.J.M. Conrad
N8	8	N.H Thornton
OF	7	P.B.J. Crowley
BF	6	L.A. Grant
RL	5	C. Willocks
LL	4	M.J. McHugh
TP	3	R.A. Dalton
HK	2	N.L. Wilson
LP	1	K.L. Skinner

== Aftermath ==
After the match, John Morkel was carried off on the shoulders of the crowd and stated "It is not often Rhodesia does a thing like this". Allen accepted defeat graciously stating "So far as Rhodesia's win was concerned, they deserved every bit of it and I can tell you that we shall be flat out to reciprocate on Saturday". Rhodesian folklore later ascribed the victory to the mythical "Shangani Mermaids" who supposedly made it harder for visiting rugby teams once they had crossed the Shangani River. The teams met three days later in Salisbury for a second game, which resulted in a 3–3 draw. On the way back to South Africa after the Rhodesian games, the All Blacks' train crashed into another train, killing one local Rhodesian railway worker and injuring one All Black. The All Blacks went on to lose the South Africa Test series 4–0 and Rhodesia scored two of the seven tries the All Blacks conceded through the whole tour. Rhodesia never won another game against a touring side before being reconstituted as Zimbabwe in 1980.
