= New Zealand National Rugby Sevens Tournament =

Annual rugby sevens tournament

New Zealand National Sevens
- Tournament logo introduced in 2018
- Sport: Rugby union
- Founded: 1975
- No. of teams: 16
- Country: New Zealand
- Most recent champions: Tasman – Men (2018); Manawatu – Women (2018)
- Website: www.nationalsevens.co.nz

The National Sevens is a rugby sevens tournament for New Zealand provincial teams. It is held annually and features a men's event and a women's event. The best teams in the country compete over two days for the respective men's and women's titles. The tournament is currently held in Tauranga.

The National Sevens also serves as an opportunity for players to be selected in New Zealand's national sevens teams.

== History ==
The National Sevens was first held in 1975 in Auckland, where Marlborough were the very first champions. Since then the tournament has been held every year (except 1987, 1988, and 2003) and held at various venues. A women's competition was introduced for the 1998 tournament in Rotorua. In the first three decades Palmerston North hosted the National Sevens thirteen times, the last of which was in 2002. This was also the last tournament to host women's sevens until women's teams were reintroduced a decade later.

Sponsors of the National Sevens
2004–2013	Pub Charity Ltd
2014–2018	Bayleys Realty
2018–present	TECT

The National Sevens moved to Queenstown for ten seasons from 2004. The 2009 event was the first tournament where the entire event was screened live by Sky TV. A women's competition was reinstated in 2013. The National Sevens was relocated to Rotorua in 2014 and then to Tauranga in December 2018.

== Format ==
The sixteen teams for men are divided into four pools. On day one each team plays the other three teams in its pool. The top two teams from each pool qualify for the championship playoffs while the bottom two enter the bowl competition.

== Venue ==
The first tournament was held in Auckland in 1975. From there it moved to various venues around the country: Christchurch, Blenheim, Hamilton, Palmerston North, Feilding, Pukekohe and Rotorua. From 2004 to 2013 it was hosted in Queenstown at the Recreation Ground, which is usually the home of the Wakatipu Rugby Club. The tournament then returned to Rotorua for five seasons and, since December 2018, it is held in Tauranga.

== Participants ==
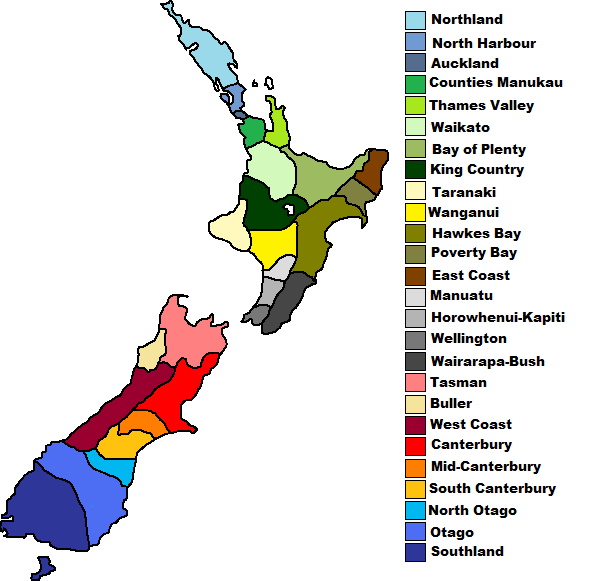
A map of NZRU provincial union boundaries, including unions competing in the National Sevens

The following teams have participated in the tournament:

Province	Appearances	Championships	2009 Placing
Auckland	2005-2009	2005, 2006, 2007, 2008	
Bay of Plenty	2006, 2008-2009		
Buller	2006		
Canterbury	2006, 2008-2009		
Counties Manukau	2006, 2008-2009		
Hawke's Bay	2006, 2008-2009		
Horowhenua-Kapiti	2008-2009		
Manawatu	2006, 2008-2009		
North Harbour	2004, 2006, 2008-2009	2004, 2009	
North Otago	2005		
Northland	2008-2009		
Otago	2004-2009		
Otago Country	2007, 2009		
South Canterbury	2006, 2008,2010		
Southland	2006, 2008-2009		
Taranaki	2006, 2008-2009		
Tasman	2008		
Waikato	2006, 2008-2009		
Wellington	2006, 2008-2009		
West Coast	2006, 2008-2009		

== Results by year ==
=== Men's tournament ===
National Sevens winners since 1975:

==== 1975–2002 ====
Year	Venue	Champion
1975	Auckland	Marlborough
1976	Christchurch	Marlborough
1977	Blenheim	Manawatu
1978	Hamilton	Manawatu
1979	Palmerston North	Manawatu
1980	Palmerston North	Auckland
1981	Palmerston North	Taranaki
1982	Feilding	Taranaki
1983	Feilding	Auckland
1984	Feilding	Auckland
1985	Feilding	Counties Manukau
1986	Feilding	North Harbour
1987	Feilding	North Harbour
1988	Feilding	Auckland
1989	Christchurch	Auckland
1990	Palmerston North	Canterbury
1991	Palmerston North	Auckland
1992	Palmerston North	North Harbour
1993	Palmerston North	Canterbury
1994	Palmerston North	Counties Manukau
1995	Palmerston North	Counties Manukau
1996	Palmerston North	Waikato
1996–97 ^{a}	Palmerston North	Waikato
1997	Rotorua	Waikato
1998	Rotorua	Waikato
1999	Palmerston North	North Harbour
2000	Palmerston North	North Harbour
2001	Palmerston North	North Harbour
2002	Palmerston North	Wellington

Notes

^^{a} There were two events in 1996 due to a seasonal switch from March to November. Waikato won four titles between 1996 and 1998.

==== 2004–2013 ====
The National Sevens switched from a November schedule to a January schedule for the 2003–04 season and, as such, the 2002 tournament was followed by the 2004 tournament. The new venue was the Recreation Ground in Queenstown which hosted the National Sevens for ten years from 2004 to 2013.

Year	Venue	Cup final			Placings			Ref.
		Winner	Score	Runner-up	Plate	Bowl	Shield	
2004	Queenstown	North Harbour	48–7	Otago	Auckland	Canterbury	Manawatu	
2005	Queenstown	Auckland	42–12	Northland	Wellington	Otago	Manawatu	
2006	Queenstown	Auckland	43–12	Wellington	Bay of Plenty	Southland	Canterbury	
2007	Queenstown	Auckland	36–17	Canterbury	Counties Manukau	Wellington	Northland	
2008; Details	Queenstown	Auckland	24–15	Counties Manukau	Manawatu	Wellington	Tasman	
2009; Details	Queenstown	North Harbour	29–26	Counties Manukau	Wellington	Otago	Southland	
2010	Queenstown	Waikato	21–14	Bay of Plenty	North Harbour	Horowhenua-Kapiti		
2011	Queenstown	Auckland	36–26	Taranaki	North Harbour	Manawatu	Canterbury	
2012	Queenstown	Auckland	36–24	Otago	Taranaki	Tasman	Bay of Plenty	
2013; Details	Queenstown	Taranaki	32–17	North Harbour	Auckland	Hawke's Bay	Counties Manukau	

==== 2014 onwards ====
The tournament moved from Queenstown to Rotorua in 2014 for five seasons. A switch from playing in January to December coincided with the event moving to Tauranga for the 2018–19 season.

Year	Venue	Cup final			Placings		Ref.
		Winner	Score	Runner-up	Semi-finalists		
2014; Details	Rotorua	Wellington	26–19	Auckland	Taranaki	Northland	
2015	Rotorua	Waikato	38–19	Wellington	Counties Manukau	Bay of Plenty	
2016	Rotorua	Counties Manukau	54–14	North Harbour	Wellington	Bay of Plenty	
2017	Rotorua	Counties Manukau	14–7	Waikato	Taranaki	Wellington	
2018	Rotorua	Waikato	21–17	Tasman	Wellington	Taranaki	
2018–19	Tauranga	Tasman	12–7	Counties Manukau	Wellington	North Harbour	
2019	Tauranga	Waikato	31–5	Auckland	Taranaki	Bay of Plenty	
2020	Cancelled due to the coronavirus pandemic						

=== Women's tournament ===
Women's teams initially competed at the National Sevens from 1998 through to 2002. After a ten-season absence, the women's tournament was reintroduced for the 2013 National Sevens held in Queenstown, with Manawatu earning the title. The tournament then moved to Rotorua in 2014 for five seasons. A switch from playing in January to December coincided with the event moving to Tauranga for the 2018–19 season.

==== 1998–2002 ====
Year	Venue	Champion
1998	Rotorua	Auckland
1999	Palmerston North	Wellington
2000	Palmerston North	Wellington
2001	Palmerston North	Auckland
2002	Palmerston North	Canterbury

==== 2013 onwards ====
Year	Venue	Cup final			Placings		Ref.
		Winner	Score	Runner-up	Semi-finalists		
2013	Queenstown	Manawatu	36–17	Waikato	Auckland	?	
2014	Rotorua	Manawatu	19–12	Auckland	Counties Manukau	Waikato	
		Winner	Score	Runner-up	Third	Fourth	
2015	Rotorua	Auckland	29–14	Manawatu	Waikato	Bay of Plenty	
2016	Rotorua	Manawatu	16–19	Wellington	Counties Manukau	Canterbury	
2017	Rotorua	Counties Manukau	24–17	Manawatu	Auckland	Waikato	
2018	Rotorua	Manawatu	17–15	Waikato	Auckland	Counties Manukau	
2018–19	Tauranga	Manawatu	12–7	Waikato	Auckland	Bay of Plenty	
2019	Tauranga	Counties Manukau	12–5	Waikato	Auckland	Bay of Plenty	
2020	Cancelled due to the coronavirus pandemic						
