= Jack Goddard =

NZ rugby union player (1920–1996)

- Born: John Wood Goddard; 31 January 1920 Timaru, New Zealand
- Died: 22 October 1996 (aged 76) Timaru, New Zealand
- Height: 1.75 m (5 ft 9 in)
- Weight: 70 kg (150 lb)
- School: Timaru Boys' High School
- Notable relative: Morrie Goddard (brother)

Rugby union career
- Position: Fullback
Provincial / State sides
Years	Team	Apps	(Points)
1941, 1944–51	South Canterbury	53	
International career
Years	Team	Apps	(Points)
1949	New Zealand	0	(0)

John Wood Goddard (31 January 1920 – 22 October 1996) was a New Zealand rugby union player. A fullback, Goddard represented South Canterbury at a provincial level, and was a member of the New Zealand national side, the All Blacks, on their 1949 tour of South Africa. He played eight matches for the All Blacks on that tour but, as the number two fullback behind Bob Scott, he did not appear in any of the Test matches.

Goddard died at Timaru on 22 October 1996, and was buried at Timaru Cemetery.

== Career ==
Goddard was born in Timaru and attended the local boys' high school. He made his provincial debut for South Canterbury in 1941 but his career was delayed due to him serving in the Second World War. He resumed playing in 1946 and played for a combined Hanan Shield team against the Australia national rugby union team where he scored a drop gaol. He underwent trials for the All Blacks in 1947 and 1948 but failed to be selected, despite scoring 13 points in the final trial game of the latter. In 1949, he was chosen to join the All Blacks' tour of South Africa as backup fullback to Bob Scott, touring alongside his brother Morrie.

The tour was not well managed due to there being no official New Zealand tour manager and due to the fact the squad contained no Māori due to South Africa's recently introduced apartheid law. Goddard played eight matches on the tour but did not play in any of the Test matches against the South Africa national rugby union team. Goddard did start in the All Blacks' 10-8 loss to Rhodesia in Bulawayo and scored the All Blacks' only conversion.

After the tour, Goddard never played for the All Blacks again. He continued to play provincially for South Canterbury, playing for them against the British Lions in 1950 and was a part of their Ranfurly Shield winning side of the same year. He retired from playing in 1951. Goddard died in 1996.
