= Gordon Lawson =

- Born: Gordon Pirie Lawson; 15 September 1899 Timaru, New Zealand
- Died: 13 September 1985 (aged 85) Timaru, New Zealand
- Height: 1.75 m (5 ft 9 in)
- Weight: 73 kg (161 lb)
- School: Timaru Boys' High School
- Occupation: Auctioneer

Rugby union career
- Position: First five-eighth
Provincial / State sides
Years	Team	Apps	(Points)
1921–30	South Canterbury	39	
International career
Years	Team	Apps	(Points)
1925	New Zealand	0	(0)

Gordon Pirie Lawson (15 September 1899 – 13 September 1985) was a New Zealand rugby union player. He was educated at Timaru Main School and then Timaru Boys' High School. A first five-eighth, Lawson representedSouth Canterbury at a provincial level, and was a member of the New Zealand national side, the All Blacks, on their 1925 tour of New South Wales. He played just two matches on that tour, and did not appear in any test matches for the All Blacks.

After retiring Lawson took an active part in rugby administration, being the president of the Timaru High School Old Boys club between 1940 and 1947, and a South Canterbury selector in 1947. His three brothers, Douglas, Allan and William all played for South Canterbury.

Lawson died in Timaru on 13 September 1985, and was buried at Timaru Cemetery.
