= Des van Jaarsveldt =

Rhodesian rugby union player (1929–2025)

Des van Jaarsveldt MBE
- Van Jaarsveldt, c. 1960
- Born: Desmond Charles van Jaarsveldt; 31 March 1929 Bulawayo, Southern Rhodesia
- Died: 21 July 2025 (aged 96) South Africa
- School: Plumtree School

Rugby union career
- Position(s): Wing, flank
Provincial / State sides
Years	Team	Apps	(Points)
1947–1962	Rhodesia	62	
International career
Years	Team	Apps	(Points)
1960	South Africa	1	(3)

Desmond Charles van Jaarsveldt MBE (31 March 1929 – 21 July 2025) was a Southern Rhodesian-born South African rugby union player and captain of the Springboks. He was nicknamed the "Bald Eagle" due to his pace on the wing and bald head. He became the first Rhodesian to captain South Africa. Upon retiring from playing, he acted as a coach and administrator for Rhodesian rugby during the transition of the country into Zimbabwe.

== Rugby career ==
=== Playing career ===
Van Jaarsveldt made his rugby debut for Rhodesia in the Currie Cup as a wing against Northern Transvaal in 1947 at the age of eighteen, scoring all of Rhodesia's points in the loss. He played 62 times for Rhodesia, initially on the wing but later moving to the flank, and scored 17 tries. He captained Rhodesia 19 times between 1958 and 1962. Van Jaarsveldt attended trials for selection for the South African national team in 1951 and 1956, but was not selected on either occasion. Van Jaarsveldt believed it was due to Afrikaner Broederbond pressures on the South African Rugby Board not to select him because he was Rhodesian.

In 1959, he was selected as captain for the Rest of South Africa against the Currie Cup champions, Western Province. When he was 31, Van Jaarsveldt became the first and only Rhodesian to captain the Springboks in 1960, taking over from Johan Claassen after being appointed by Danie Craven, the president of the South African Rugby Board. Previously it had been considered politically unacceptable by the ruling South African National Party for a Rhodesian to captain the Springboks as previously John Morkel was denied an opportunity despite captaining Rhodesia to a 10–8 win over New Zealand in 1949 (which Van Jaarsveldt missed due to injury). The Afrikaner nationalist newspaper Die Transvaler criticised the appointment of Van Jaarsveldt stating: "It is an evil day for South African rugby when the country has to seek its rugby captain from beyond its borders in the territory of a strange land." Contrary to this view, the team and the nation at large supported him. Despite his name being similar to Afrikaner names (his familial background was from the Netherlands and did not have any Afrikaner connection), Van Jaarsveldt could not speak Afrikaans and stated about that day "It must be the first time a Springbok captain has had to give his team talk in English." He captained the Springboks in an 18–10 victory over Scotland at Port Elizabeth.

Despite the success, Van Jaarsveldt was never picked for South Africa again. This was attributed to his lack of ability to speak Afrikaans (which the selectors did not know of when he was selected) and Anglophobia from the South African selectors. It was also claimed that his decision not to follow the Springboks tradition of the captain leading a team prayer, which Van Jaarsveldt attributed to not being in his nature to pray for victory, and not giving a long motivational speech was also not received well by some players. It was also speculated that he was only appointed captain as a token gesture by Craven in what was considered a low-profile match as it was viewed as only a warm-up for the upcoming New Zealand tour of South Africa.

In 2019, following the death of Claassen, Van Jaarsveldt became the oldest living former Springbok and was the oldest living South African rugby captain. In 2013, as the oldest living Springbok captain, he was invited to cast his handprints alongside the oldest living South African Coloured Rugby Football Board and the South African African Rugby Board representative captains in the newly opened South Africa Rugby Museum. Also in that year, he played in a legends match for the Springboks at the age of 83 against Zimbabwe Legends to commemorate the 75th anniversary of the Matabeleland Rugby Football Union at Hartsfield Rugby Ground. He took the kick-off and was then substituted.

=== Test history ===
No.	Opponents	Results (SA 1st)	Position	Tries	Dates	Venue
1.	Scotland	18–10	Flank (c)	1	30 April 1960	Boet Erasmus Stadium, Port Elizabeth

=== Coaching and administration ===
Van Jaarsveldt also coached the Rhodesian team from 1967 to 1970, where he once received criticism from the New Zealand All Blacks coach for instructing Rhodesia to shirt-pull and obstruct All Black players. He was president of the Rhodesia RFU in 1979. As the president of the Rhodesian Rugby Football Union, he ran Rhodesian rugby during the transition of the country to black majority rule. In 1979 following the establishment of Zimbabwe Rhodesia, he called for a meeting of all national sporting bodies to determine a unified approach to any potential name changes which included possibly dropping Rhodesia from their names. This meeting did not occur as several bodies preferred to unilaterally decide on their own names. In 1980, with the newly renamed Zimbabwe Rugby Union, Van Jaarsveldt led an unsuccessful campaign against the Prime Minister of Zimbabwe, Robert Mugabe's announcement that Zimbabwe was to sever all sporting connections with South Africa due to their apartheid policies. In the run up to this decision, Van Jaarsveldt did approach the Rugby Football Union on Zimbabwe's tour of England, their first outside of Africa and as a result of the Surrey Rugby Football Union touring Rhodesia the previous year, to see if Zimbabwe could affiliate with England.

== Personal life and death ==
Van Jaarsveldt was born in Bulawayo in Southern Rhodesia (now Zimbabwe) and he was educated at Plumtree School. In addition to his rugby career, he also represented Southern Rhodesia as a heavyweight boxer in the 1950 South African Championships. He was appointed a Member of the Most Excellent Order of the British Empire (MBE) in the 1963 New Year Honours for "services to sport in Southern Rhodesia".

Van Jaarsveldt died in South Africa on 21 July 2025, at the age of 96.

== Political life ==
Van Jaarsveldt briefly entered politics in 1983, unsuccessfully standing for former Rhodesian Prime Minister Ian Smith's Republican Front for a seat in the Senate of Zimbabwe in which he lost the election after drawing of lots on a 10–10 tied vote.

== See also ==
- List of South Africa national rugby union players – Springbok no. 354
- South African rugby union captains
