= Jock Ross =

Jock Ross may refer to:

- Jock Ross (rugby union) (born 1949), New Zealand rugby player
- Jock Ross (1920s footballer), Scottish football player.
- William "Jock" Ross (born 1943), Australian outlaw biker
