= Bill Conrad =

- Full name: William John McKeown Conrad
- Born: 10 May 1925 Taumarunui, New Zealand
- Died: 14 August 1972 (aged 47) Auckland, New Zealand
- Height: 175 cm (5 ft 9 in)
- Weight: 82 kg (181 lb)
- School: Taumarunui High School; Sacred Heart College, Auckland

Rugby union career
- Position: Halfback
International career
| Years | Team | Apps | (Points) |
| 1949 | New Zealand | | |

William John McKeown Conrad (10 May 1925 — 14 August 1972) was a New Zealand rugby union international.

Born in Taumarunui, Conrad was a strongly built halfback and played his early provincial rugby for King Country, before switching to Waikato when he moved to Hamilton Marist in 1948.

Conrad toured South Africa with the All Blacks in 1949 and featured in 10 uncapped matches. He scored his only All Blacks try in the loss to Rhodesia at Hartsfield Rugby Ground in Bulawayo.

== See also ==
- List of New Zealand national rugby union players
