= Ron Stewart (disambiguation) =

Ron Stewart (1932–2012) was a Canadian professional ice hockey player.

Ron Stewart may also refer to:

- Ron Stewart (Canadian football) (born 1934), former Canadian football player
- Ronald Stewart (1927–2022), Member of Canadian Parliament
- Ron Stewart (Canadian politician) (1942–2024), member of Nova Scotia government
- Ron Stewart (bluegrass) (born 1968), American multi-instrumentalist musician
- Ron Stewart (rugby union) (1904–1982), New Zealand rugby union player
- Ron Stewart (Oklahoma politician), American politician
