= Morrie Goddard =

NZ rugby union player (1921–1974)

- Born: Maurice Patrick Goddard; 28 September 1921 Timaru, New Zealand
- Died: 19 June 1974 (aged 52) Christchurch, New Zealand
- Height: 1.75 m (5 ft 9 in)
- Weight: 75 kg (165 lb)
- School: Timaru Boys' High School
- Notable relative: Jack Goddard (brother)

Rugby union career
- Position: Centre three-quarter
Provincial / State sides
Years	Team	Apps	(Points)
1942	Ashburton County	3	(12)
1946–54	South Canterbury		
International career
Years	Team	Apps	(Points)
1946–49	New Zealand	5	(3)

Maurice Patrick Goddard (28 September 1921 – 19 June 1974) was a New Zealand rugby union player. A centre three-quarter, Goddard represented Ashburton County and South Canterbury at a provincial level, and was a member of the New Zealand national side, the All Blacks, from 1946 to 1949. He played 20 matches for the All Blacks including five internationals, scoring nine tries in all.

During World War II, Goddard served in both the army and air force, and made appearances in rugby matches for New Zealand Services, England Services, Combined Dominions and the Royal Air Force.

Goddard died in Christchurch on 19 June 1974, and was buried at Timaru Cemetery.
