= South Canterbury Rugby Football Union =

New Zealand rugby province

Club information
- Full name: South Canterbury Rugby Football Union
- Colours: Green and Black Hoops
- Founded: 1888
- Website: scrfu.co.nz

Current details
- Ground: Fraser Park
- Competition: Heartland Championship

The South Canterbury Rugby Football Union (SCRFU) is a rugby province based in the central South Island city of Timaru, New Zealand. The South Canterbury team play at Fraser Park located in Timaru.

== History ==
Club rugby in South Canterbury predated the formation of South Canterbury RFU by at least two decades. The first recorded club rugby match in South Canterbury was played on 15 October 1867 between The Timaru and Temuka Clubs at Arowhenua. Eight years later, in 1875, the South Canterbury Football Club was formed, founded by Alfred St. George Hamersley the former captain of the England national rugby union team and resident of Timaru. Soon after on 24 May 1875 a match was played between North and South Canterbury at Ashburton that resulted in a draw. More clubs were formed, such as the Waimate Football Club on 24 May 1876, and Christchurch are recorded as playing Temuka in 1876. On 26 July 1879, a meeting was held in Timaru at the instigation again of Hamersley, at which delegates representing the clubs Christchurch, Christ's College, Temuka, North Canterbury (Rangiora), Eastern (Christchurch), South Canterbury (Timaru), Ashburton, and Southbridge agreed to form the Canterbury Rugby Football Union.

The South Canterbury Rugby Football Union (SCRFU) was formed in 1888 when it broke away from the Canterbury Rugby Football Union. A meeting of delegates from football clubs in South Canterbury was held at the office of "Messrs Hamersley and Wood, Timaru, to consider the advisability of forming a Rugby Football Union in the district." Once again, Hamersley was involved in a pivotal point in the history of rugby in the region and his role was commemorated in 2010 with the introduction of the Hamersley trophy, a 186 cm tall silver trophy, for the winners of the senior rugby competition (the Personnel Placements club rugby championship). This meeting was attended by delegates from the South Canterbury, Pirates, Temuka, Waimate, Geraldine, Winchester and Fairlie Creek clubs and as a result of the union the South Canterbury club agreed to change its name to the Timaru Club. Formal association with the Canterbury RFU was broken and it was established that the boundaries of the South Canterbury union were to be the Rangitata and Waitaki rivers, and the headquarters was Timaru. Soon after, a representative match was played on 24 July 1888 against the New Zealand Native Team on the Athletic Grounds, Timaru.

South Canterbury has produced a number of All Blacks and are one of the few unions to have played in all three Divisions of the NPC. South Canterbury has also had some notable victories over touring international sides including the 1961 French team. In 2011 the South Canterbury Heartland team played the 2011 Russian World Cup team who toured New Zealand before the 2011 Rugby World Cup at Fraser Park. Also 2011 saw two sell out Super 15 games played at Fraser Park in Timaru - the Crusaders vs the Bulls and Crusaders vs The Blues.

== Representative Rugby ==
The South Canterbury Rugby team play from Fraser Park, Timaru and they play their rugby in the Heartland Championship. They also compete against Mid Canterbury and North Otago for the Hanan Shield.

=== 2025 squad ===
The South Canterbury squad for 2025 Heartland Championship:

Forwards: Anthony Amato (Waimate), Ben Kerr (Celtic), Conor Anderson (Celtic), Finlay Joyce (Temuka), Fletcher Joyce (Temuka), Jack Pani (Temuka), James Russek (Mackenzie), Junior Faavae (Temuka), Keegan Gray (Pleasant Point), Malakai Uasi (Harlequins), Maloni Uhi (Harlequins), Paula Moli (Waimate), Shane Fikken (Temuka), Siu Kakala (Harlequins), Solomone Lavaka (Temuka), Tangi Sevelio (Harlequins), Tokoma'ata Fakatava (Waimate), Vaka Taelega (Temuka).

Backs: Angus Mitchell (Mackenzie), Caleb McNoe (Temuka), Clarence Moli (Waimate), Daniel Patterson (Waimate), Jimmy Robertson (Mackenzie), Kalavini Leatigaga (Temuka), Lisiate Folau (Harlequins), Miles Medlicott (Waimate), Morrison Vaisola (Temuka), Paula Fifita (Harlequins), Peala Matakaiongo (Celtic), Peni Kadralevu (Harlequins), Samiuela Ahokovi (Harlequins), Sioeli Filimoehala (Harlequins), Sireli Masi Jnr (Geraldine), William Wright (Celtic), Zac Saunders (Celtic).

Coach: Nigel Walsh

=== Championships ===
==== National Provincial Championship (1976-2005) ====
South Canterbury 2001 NPC 3rd Div Champions

In the NPC South Canterbury won:

- the 2nd division South Island in 1976, 1977 and 1981
- the 3rd division in 1986, 1991, 1998 and 2001

==== Heartland Championship placings ====
In the Heartland Championship South Canterbury have won:

- the Meads Cup in 2021, 2022 and 2023
- the Lochore Cup in 2013 and 2019.

Heartland Championship results
Year	Pld	W	D	L	PF	PA	PD	BP	Pts	Place	Playoffs		
Year	Pld	W	D	L	PF	PA	PD	BP	Pts	Place	Qual	Semifinal	Final
2006	8	3	0	5	28	102	−74	2	14	5th	No	—	
2007	8	4	0	4	139	173	−34	3	19	2nd	Lochore Cup	Won 31–23 against West Coast	Lost 35–38 to Poverty Bay
2008	8	3	1	4	181	167	+14	4	19	4th	Lochore Cup	Lost 30–43 to Poverty Bay	—
2009	8	5	0	3	169	198	−29	2	22	4th	Meads Cup	Lost 17–19 to Mid Canterbury	—
2010	6	4	0	2	121	119	+2	1	17	5th	No	—	
2011	8	4	0	4	239	187	+52	6	22	6th	Lochore Cup	Won 30–27 against Thames Valley	Lost 22–49 to Poverty Bay
2012	8	5	0	3	265	227	+38	4	21	6th	Lochore Cup	Won 48–20 against Mid Canterbury	Lost 28–31 to Buller
2013	8	4	0	4	246	202	+44	7	23	5th	Lochore Cup	Won 14–18 against Thames Valley	Won 17–10 against Buller
2014	8	4	0	4	202	165	+37	5	21	6th	Lochore Cup	Lost 12–16 to North Otago	—
2015	8	7	0	1	346	162	+184	7	35	1st	Meads Cup	Won 25–21 against Wairarapa Bush	Lost 11–28 against Wanganui
2016	8	7	0	1	324	162	+162	7	36	2nd	Meads Cup	Lost 6-16 against Buller	—
2017	8	7	0	1	273	190	+83	8	36	1st	Meads Cup	Lost 24-29 to Wanganui	—
2018	8	6	0	2	341	151	+190	8	32	2nd	Meads Cup	Won 58-21 against King Country	Lost 12-17 against Thames Valley
2019	8	4	1	3	237	176	+61	7	25	7th	Lochore Cup	Won 56-24 against Buller	Won 23-19 against West Coast
2021	8	8	0	0	365	124	+241	8	40	1st	Meads Cup	No semi-final played	Won 35-16 against Thames Valley
2022	8	8	0	0	368	122	+246	7	39	1st	Meads Cup	Won 76-9 against King Country	Won 47-36 against Whanganui
2023	8	8	0	0	341	180	+161	8	40	1st	Meads Cup	Won 34-17 against Ngati Porou East Coast	Won 40-30 against Whanganui
2024	8	8	0	0	327	214	+113	8	40	1st	Meads Cup	Lost 16-17 to Mid Canterbury	—
2025	8	5	0	3	297	239	+58	4	29	2nd	Meads Cup	Lost 31-61 to Thames Valley	—
2026	8	5	0	3	391	253	+138	8	28	5th	Lochore Cup	Won 36-26 against Wairarapa Bush	Lost 42-43 to Whanganui

There was no Heartland Championship in the 2020 season due to Covid-19 restrictions.

=== Ranfurly Shield ===
South Canterbury has held the Ranfurly Shield twice, in 1950 and 1974.

==== 1950 ====
Matches played:

1950 South Canterbury Team

- South Canterbury 17 vs Wairarapa 14, Masterton,
- North Auckland 20 vs South Canterbury 9, Timaru,

Team members:

- Coach: Brushy Mitchell (centre, second row)
- Captain: Morrie Goddard (third from left)
- Vice Captain: Lachie Grant (third from right)

==== 1974 ====
1974 South Canterbury Team

In 1974 South Canterbury successfully challenged Marlborough who had unexpectedly taken the Shield off Canterbury the season before. South Canterbury defended the Shield against North Otago but then lost it to Wellington.

Matches played:

- South Canterbury 18 vs Marlborough 6, Blenheim on 17 August
- South Canterbury 9 vs North Otago 3, Timaru on 31 August
- Wellington 9 vs South Canterbury 3, Timaru on 3 September

Team members:

- Captain: Ken Milne

=== Hanan Shield ===
The Hanan Shield is one of the most prestigious trophies in New Zealand's domestic rugby union competition. First played for in 1946, the Hanan Shield is based on a challenge system played between North Otago, South Canterbury and Mid Canterbury.

=== International Victories ===
South Canterbury has recorded wins versus international tourists:

- 17 - 14 against France in 1961
- California 1972
- Romania 1975
- Japan 1979
- Tonga 1983.

=== Sevens ===
South Canterbury hosted the 2010 and 2011 South Island Sevens Tournament at Fraser Park in Timaru, a provincial qualifier to the New Zealand National Rugby Sevens Tournament in Queenstown. South Canterbury has qualified and competed at a number of New Zealand National Rugby Sevens Tournament the last being in 2011.

== Club Rugby ==
=== Current clubs ===
South Canterbury Rugby Football Union is made up of nine clubs:

- Timaru Celtic RFC
- Geraldine RFC
- Harlequins RFC (Amalgamation of Zingari and Star in 1998)
- Mackenzie RFC
- Old Boys RFC
- Pareora RFC
- Pleasant Point RFC
- Temuka RFC
- Waimate RFC

=== Club rugby championship winners ===
Club Champions
1888 Waihi (1)	1889 Waihi (2)	1890 Timaru (1)	1891 Waihi (3)
1892 Union (1)	1893 Union (2)	1894 Timaru (2)/Union (3)	1895 Waihi (4)
1896 Star (1)	1897 Waihi (5)	1898 Colonial (1)	1899 Colonial (2)
1900 Waihi (6)	1901 Temuka (1)	1902 Temuka (2)	1903 Temuka (3)
1904 Temuka (4)	1905 Star (2)	1906 Temuka (5)	1907 Temuka (6)
1908 Pirates (1)	1909 Pirates (2)	1910 Temuka (7)	1911 Celtic (1)
1912 Zingari (1)	1912 Celtic (2)	1914 Zingari (2)	1915 Temuka (8)
1916 No competition (WW1)	1917 Geraldine (1)	1918 Star (3)	1919 Temuka (9)
1920 Temuka (10)	1921 Zingari (3)	1922 Old Boys (1)	1923 Zingari (4)
1924 Old Boys (2)	1925 Old Boys (3)	1926 Zingari (5)	1927 Old Boys (4)
1928 Old Boys (5)	1929 Star (4)	1930 Old Boys (6)	1931 Star (5)
1932 Star (6)	1933 Star (7)	1934 Star (8)	1935 Star (9)
1936 Star (10)	1937 Temuka (11)	1938 Temuka (12)	1939 Temuka (13)
1940 Temuka (14)	1941 Celtic (3)	1942 Army 'A' (1)	1943 No competition (WW2)
1944 Makikihi (1)	1945 Temuka (15)	1946 Temuka (16)	1947 Old Boys (7)
1948 Celtic (4)	1949 Geraldine (2)	1950 Zingari (6)	1951 Zingari (7)
1952 Celtic (5)	1953 Celtic (6)	1954 Zingari (8)	1955 Celtic (7)
1956 Temuka (17)	1957 Celtic (8)	1958 Waimate (1)	1959 Geraldine (3)
1960 Waimate (2)	1961 Zingari (9)	1962 Old Boys (8)	1963 Old Boys (9)
1964 Temuka (18)	1965 Temuka (19)	1966 Temuka (20)	1967 Temuka (21)
1968 Temuka (22)	1969 Zingari (10)	1970 Zingari (11)	1971 Old Boys (10)
1972 Star (11)	1973 Zingari (12)	1974 Old Boys (11)	1975 Old Boys (12)
1976 Old Boys (13)/Temuka (23)	1977 Temuka (24)	1978 Temuka (25)	1979 Old Boys (14)/Temuka (26)
1980 Temuka (27)	1981 Temuka (28)	1982 Temuka (29)	1983 Old Boys (15)
1984 Temuka (30)	1985 Temuka (31)	1986 Temuka (32)	1987 Star (12)
1988 Star (13)	1989 Star (14)	1990 Waimate (3)	1991 Temuka (33)
1992 Temuka (34)	1993 Temuka (35)	1994 Waimate (4)	1995 Waimate (5)
1996 Temuka (36)	1997 Temuka (37)	1998 Harlequins (1)	1999 Temuka (38)
2000 Harlequins (2)	2001 Temuka (39)	2002 Harlequins (3)	2003 MacKenzie (1)
2004 Harlequins (4)	2005 Pleasant Point (1)	2006 Celtic (9)	2007 Harlequins (5)
2008 Harlequins (6)	2009 Celtic (10)	2010 Celtic (11)	2011 Celtic (12)
2012 Celtic (13)	2013 Celtic (14)	2014 Celtic (15)	2015 Celtic (16)
2016 Celtic (17)	2017 Celtic (18)	2018 Celtic (19)	2019 Temuka (40)
2020 Temuka (41)	2021 Temuka (42)	2022 Celtic (20)	2023 Temuka (43)
2024 Harlequins (7)	2025 Harlequins (8)	2026 Harlequins (9)	

=== Recent club grand final results ===
- 2026 - Harlequins 24-19 Temuka
- 2025 - Harlequins 38-34 Temuka
- 2024 - Harlequins 35-33 Celtic
- 2023 - Temuka 38-31 Waimate
- 2022 - Celtic 22-18 Waimate

=== Total championships by club ===
South Canterbury club rugby titles (1888 - 2024)

Club	Total Titles	Outright	Shared	Last winning season:
Temuka	43	41	2	2023
Celtic	20	20		2022
Old Boys	15	15		1983
Star	14	14		1989
Zingari	12	12		1973
Harlequins	9	9		2026
Waihi	6	6		1888
Waimate	5	5		1995
Union	3	2	1	1894
Geraldine	3	3		1959
Timaru	2	1	1	1894
Colonial	2	2		1899
Pirates	2	2		1909
Army 'A'	1	1		1942
Makikihi	1	1		1944
MacKenzie	1	1		2003
Pleasant Point	1	1		2005

== High School Rugby ==
Timaru Boys' High School and Roncalli College 1st XV play in the Crusaders Region Secondary Schools' Rugby Championship.

In 1995 Timaru BHS made the Top 4 of the National First XV Championship losing 22-27 to Kelston Boys' High School but winning the 3rd v 4th play off against Southland Boys' High School by 25-10. In 2017 Timaru BHS made the Crusaders final but lost to Christchurch Boys' High School by 10-18.

== All Blacks ==
There have been 22 players selected for the All Blacks whilst playing their club rugby in South Canterbury.

Name	All Black number	Year
John Gardner	25	1893
Charles Macintosh	39	1893
David Stewart	54	1894
Alf Budd	160	1910
Tom Lynch	177	1913
Gus Spillane	200	1913
Eric Cockroft	203	1913
Percy Storey	224	1920
Ron Stewart	288	1923
Gordon Lawson	320	1925
Archie Strang	342	1928
Tom Metcalfe	384	1931
George Adkins	409	1935
Tom Morrison	441	1938
Charles Saxton	443	1938
Morrie Goddard	467	1946
Lachie Grant	471	1947
Jack Goddard	499	1949
Thomas Coughlan	592	1958
Allan Stewart	638	1963
Tom Lister	673	1968
Lyn Jaffray	711	1972

To view player profile, go to allblacks.com

== Super Rugby ==
South Canterbury along with Canterbury, Tasman, Buller, Mid Canterbury and West Coast make up the Crusaders Super Rugby franchise.

South Canterbury players in Super Rugby:

- Graeme Dempster - 4 games for the Canterbury Crusaders (1996)
- Brendan Laney - after having representing South Canterbury (1991-94) Laney played for Otago (1995–2001), 44 games for the Otago Highlanders (1997–2001) and 20 games for Scotland
