= John Morkel =

South African-born Rhodesian international rugby union player

- John Morkel
- Full name: John Clother Morkel
- Born: 22 August 1928 Cape Town, Cape Province, Union of South Africa
- Died: 4 July 2010 (aged 81) Pietermaritzburg, South Africa
- School: South African College Schools
- University: University of Stellenbosch
- Notable relative: Harry Morkel (grandfather)
- Occupation: Farmer

Rugby union career
- Position: Lock
Senior career
Years	Team	Apps	(Points)
- Western Province
International career
Years	Team	Apps	(Points)
1949–51	Rhodesia		

John Clother Morkel (22 August 1928 – 4 July 2010) was a South African-born Rhodesian international rugby union player. He was born in Cape Town, Union of South Africa and was the captain of the Rhodesia national rugby union team and played as a lock.

After retiring from rugby he worked as a farmer in Rhodesia and later entered Zimbabwean politics. He died in 2010 in Pietermaritzburg, South Africa after hip surgery.

== Army career ==
After being educated at South African College Schools, Morkel served in the Second World War as a member of the 6th South African Armoured Division after moving from training to be a fighter pilot in the South African Air Force. In Egypt in 1943, he was selected as part of the Division's touring rugby team after a trial in Cairo which was held with the players taking part barefoot. They would play matches against other Regiments in the British Empire's forces based mostly in Italy but did tour the United Kingdom and finished their tour of duty with 19 wins and 2 losses. Morkel himself, would be attached to the General Staff and would visit Adolf Hitler's Führerbunker days after Hitler's death as a result.

== Rugby career ==
After the war, Morkel attended Stellenbosch University and captained their rugby team. Upon graduating, he played one season for Western Province. In 1949, he moved to Southern Rhodesia to work as a tobacco farmer on land that his grandfather had purchased in 1891. During that time, he became the captain of Rhodesia and led them to a 10–8 win over the All Blacks whom were on the 1949 New Zealand rugby union tour of South Africa. He was carried off the pitch on the shoulders of spectators and said "It is not often Rhodesia does a thing like this." The win was the only time the All Blacks have lost to a non-Test rugby playing nation.

For his performances, it was proposed that he would play test rugby for South Africa (colloquially known as the Springboks) and captain them in their upcoming tour of the United Kingdom. However reportedly the notion of having a Rhodesian captain was not popular with the South African ruling National Party and he did not tour. The first and only Rhodesian captain of the Springboks would be Des van Jaarsveldt in 1960. Morkel would go on to captain Rhodesia thirteen times.

== Post rugby ==
Morkel remained in Southern Rhodesia as a farmer. Rhodesia's Unilateral Declaration of Independence and subsequent UN sanctions affected his work. By 1974, he owned a 15,000-acre farm that housed over 200 workers and members of the local community. Morkel's family would be subject to attack by ZANLA guerrillas, which would necessitate Rhodesian Army soldiers to be located on their land by 1978 to defend it during the Rhodesian Bush War. During the Bush War, he was a reservist for the British South Africa Police. When Rhodesia was reconstituted as Zimbabwe, Morkel moved to Chiredzi and served as their mayor. He remained in Zimbabwe until 2009 when he moved to Howick, KwaZulu-Natal, South Africa. He died on 4 July 2010 in Pietermaritzburg following complications from hip replacement surgery.
