= Christine Ross (rugby union) =

New Zealand rugby union player

- Born: Christine C. Beattie; 24 July 1964 (age 62) Hastings, New Zealand
- Height: 1.73 m (5 ft 8 in)
- Weight: 70 kg (154 lb)
- School: Karamu High School
- Notable relative: Isaac Ross (son)
- Occupations: Police officer; funeral director; farmer

Rugby union career
- Position: Fullback
Provincial / State sides
Years	Team	Apps	(Points)
- Canterbury
International career
Years	Team	Apps	(Points)
1989–1996	New Zealand	13	(83)

Christine C. Ross (née Beattie; born 24 July 1964) is a former New Zealand rugby union player. A fullback, she debuted for the New Zealand women's national side, the Black Ferns, in 1989 against the visiting California Grizzlies at Christchurch. She represented New Zealand at RugbyFest 1990 and at the inaugural 1991 Women's Rugby World Cup.

== Personal life ==
Ross is the niece of Eru Beattie, who was a member of the New Zealand Māori rugby team in 1966. She is married to former All Black Jock Ross, and their children include Isaac Ross, who was also an All Black, and Adam Ross, who represented New Zealand in rugby at under-19 level.
