= 2013 Pub Charity Sevens =

New Zealand rugby sevens tournament

- Host nation: New Zealand
- Date: 12–13 January 2013

Cup
- Champion: Taranaki
- Runner-up: North Harbour

Plate
- Winner: Auckland
- Runner-up: Wellington

Bowl
- Winner: Hawke's Bay
- Runner-up: Manawatu

Shield
- Winner: Counties Manukau
- Runner-up: Canterbury

Tournament details
- Matches played: 44

The 2013 New Zealand National Rugby Sevens Tournament known as the Pub Charity Sevens was hosted in Queenstown, New Zealand, on 12–13 January 2013. It was the 10th and final year Queenstown hosted the event, with matches played at the Queenstown Recreational Ground and Jack Reid Park in Arrowtown. Sixteen men's provincial teams qualified to compete in the annual national tournament following three regional tournaments (Southern, Central and Northern regions) in November and December.

== Format ==
Teams from the 26 Provincial Unions have to qualify to attend at the National Event in Queenstown. The teams are divided into pools of four teams, who play a round-robin within the pool. The top two teams in each pool advanced to the Cup competition. The four quarterfinal losers dropped into the bracket for the Plate. The Bowl was contested by the third- and fourth-place finishers in each pool, with the losers in the Bowl quarterfinals dropping into the bracket for the Shield.

== Qualifying ==
2013 Pub Charity Rugby Sevens qualifying began on the 24 November 2012 in Timaru, where 16 teams earned a place in the tournament, this automatically qualified them for the event in Queenstown.

Central	Northern	Southern
Hawke's Bay; Manawatu; Taranaki; Wairarapa Bush; Wellington	Auckland; Bay of Plenty; Counties Manukau; North Harbour; Northland; Waikato	Canterbury; Otago; Tasman; South Canterbury; Southland

=== Southern Region ===
Otago defeated Canterbury 34-21 in the men's final to claim the Tofa Shield. Canterbury, Tasman, Southland and tournament hosts South Canterbury have all qualified for the men's National Sevens for 2013. Otago are not required to qualify given they host the Nationals in Queenstown but they won the event and so it was down to the other 3 semi-finalists plus the winner of the 5th/6th playoff.

Games

Pool stage

24 November 2012	Tasman	17–15	Southland	Timaru, New Zealand
24 November 2012	Otago	43–5	North Otago	Timaru, New Zealand
24 November 2012	Canterbury	24–5	Mid Canterbury	Timaru, New Zealand
24 November 2012	Southland	26–12	South Canterbury	Timaru, New Zealand
24 November 2012	Tasman	17–35	Canterbury	Timaru, New Zealand
24 November 2012	Otago	35–21	Mid Canterbury	Timaru, New Zealand
24 November 2012	South Canterbury	19–7	North Otago	Timaru, New Zealand
24 November 2012	Canterbury	19–12	Southland	Timaru, New Zealand
24 November 2012	Mid Canterbury	19–26	North Otago	Timaru, New Zealand
24 November 2012	South Canterbury	7–31	Tasman	Timaru, New Zealand

5th/6th Playoff

24 November 2012	South Canterbury	38–7	North Otago	Timaru, New Zealand

Semi-finals

24 November 2012	Canterbury	26–21	Southland	Timaru, New Zealand
24 November 2012	Otago	43–14	Tasman	Timaru, New Zealand

Final

24 November 2012	Otago	34–21	Canterbury	Timaru, New Zealand

=== Northern Region ===
Of the eight men's teams competing, there were six spots up for grabs for nationals and with the Auckland Barbarians not eligible to qualify it means just one team will miss out. Auckland hosted the Northern Region National Sevens Qualifying tournament at the Waitemata Rugby Club.

Waikato, North Harbour, Auckland, Counties Manukau, Bay of Plenty and Northland all qualified for 2013. Thames Valley were the only team to miss out after losing their 6th v 7th playoff 15–10 to Northland.

Games

Pool stage

8 December 2012	Counties Manukau	24–12	Thames Valley	Waitemata, New Zealand
8 December 2012	Auckland	26–12	Bay of Plenty	Waitemata, New Zealand
8 December 2012	Counties Manukau	–	Bay of Plenty	Waitemata, New Zealand
8 December 2012	Auckland	24–14	Thames Valley	Waitemata, New Zealand
8 December 2012	Bay of Plenty	38–5	Thames Valley	Waitemata, New Zealand
8 December 2012	Auckland	24–5	Counties Manukau	Waitemata, New Zealand
8 December 2012	North Harbour	22–15	Auckland Barbarians	Waitemata, New Zealand
8 December 2012	Waikato	33–12	Northland	Waitemata, New Zealand
8 December 2012	North Harbour	17–14	Northland	Waitemata, New Zealand
8 December 2012	Waikato	21–12	Auckland Barbarians	Waitemata, New Zealand
8 December 2012	Northland	19–19	Auckland Barbarians	Waitemata, New Zealand
8 December 2012	Waikato	7–22	North Harbour	Waitemata, New Zealand

7th/8th Playoff

8 December 2012	Northland	15–10	Thames Valley	Waitemata, New Zealand

Semi-finals

8 December 2012	Auckland	19–21	Waikato	Waitemata, New Zealand
8 December 2012	North Harbour	24–12	Counties Manukau	Waitemata, New Zealand

Final

8 December 2012	Waikato	36–26	North Harbour	Waitemata, New Zealand

=== Central Region ===
The Men's competition will follow a cross pool structure with teams being split into two pools of three, each team will play all teams from the opposing pool to develop a ranking system for playoffs. Pools were selected based on official rankings from the 2012 National sevens held in Queenstown.

Hawke's Bay, Manawatu, Taranaki, Wairarapa Bush and Wellington all qualified for the men's 2013 Pub Charity Sevens with Horowhenua Kapiti missing out after finishing 6th.

Games

Pool stage

15 December 2012	Taranaki	12–33	Manawatu	Palmerston North, New Zealand
15 December 2012	Wellington	26–7	Hawke's Bay	Palmerston North, New Zealand
15 December 2012	Horowhenua Kapiti	12–17	Wairarapa Bush	Palmerston North, New Zealand
15 December 2012	Wellington	5–26	Manawatu	Palmerston North, New Zealand
15 December 2012	Taranaki	43–7	Wairarapa Bush	Palmerston North, New Zealand
15 December 2012	Horowhenua Kapiti	5–22	Hawke's Bay	Palmerston North, New Zealand
15 December 2012	Wellington	17–26	Wairarapa Bush	Palmerston North, New Zealand
15 December 2012	Horowhenua Kapiti	0–41	Manawatu	Palmerston North, New Zealand
15 December 2012	Taranaki	12–14	Hawke's Bay	Palmerston North, New Zealand

3rd/4th Playoff

15 December 2012	Wairarapa Bush	0–29	Taranaki	Palmerston North, New Zealand

5th/6th Playoff

15 December 2012	Wellington	33–5	Horowhenua Kapiti	Palmerston North, New Zealand

Final

15 December 2012	Manawatu	19–47	Hawke's Bay	Palmerston North, New Zealand

== Pool stage ==
The first round, or pool stage, saw the 16 teams divided into four pools of four teams. Each pool was a round-robin of six games, where each team played one match against each of the other teams in the same pool. Teams were awarded three points for a win, two points for a draw and one for a defeat.

The teams finishing in the top two of each pool advanced to the cup quarterfinals.

Key to colours in group tables
Teams that advance to the Cup Quarterfinal

Pld = matches played, W = matches won, D = draws, L = losses, TF = tries for, PF = match points for, PA = match points against, +/− = sum total of points for/against, Pts = pool points

=== Pool A ===
Team	Pld	W	D	L	PF	PA	+/−	Pts
Auckland	3	3	0	0	95	31	+64	9
Wellington	3	2	0	1	72	57	+15	7
Tasman	3	1	0	2	53	72	−19	5
South Canterbury	3	0	0	3	31	91	−60	3

12 January 2013
11:50

Wellington	26–12	Tasman

Queenstown, New Zealand

12 January 2013
12:10

Auckland	21–14	South Canterbury

Queenstown, New Zealand

12 January 2013
14:30

Wellington	36–7	South Canterbury

Queenstown, New Zealand

12 January 2013
14:50

Auckland	36–7	Tasman

Queenstown, New Zealand

12 January 2013
18:10

Tasman	34–10	South Canterbury

Queenstown, New Zealand

12 January 2013
18:30

Auckland	38–10	Wellington

Queenstown, New Zealand

=== Pool B ===
Team	Pld	W	D	L	PF	PA	+/−	Pts
Otago	3	2	1	0	89	38	+51	8
North Harbour	3	2	0	1	81	53	+28	7
Hawke's Bay	3	1	1	1	81	48	+33	6
Wairarapa Bush	3	0	0	3	15	127	−112	3

12 January 2013
12:30

North Harbour	24–22	Hawke's Bay

Queenstown, New Zealand

12 January 2013
12:50

Otago	49–0	Wairarapa Bush

Queenstown, New Zealand

12 January 2013
15:10

Hawke's Bay	40–5	Wairarapa Bush

Queenstown, New Zealand

12 January 2013
15:30

Otago	21–19	North Harbour

Queenstown, New Zealand

12 January 2013
18:50

North Harbour	38–10	Wairarapa Bush

Queenstown, New Zealand

12 January 2013
19:10

Otago	19–19	Hawke's Bay

Queenstown, New Zealand

=== Pool C ===
Team	Pld	W	D	L	PF	PA	+/−	Pts
Northland	3	2	0	1	58	39	+19	7
Southland	3	2	0	1	55	52	+3	7
Waikato	3	1	0	2	73	58	+15	5
Manawatu	3	1	0	2	35	72	−37	5

12 January 2013
11:10

Manawatu	5–12	Southland

Queenstown, New Zealand

12 January 2013
11:30

Waikato	7–17	Northland

Queenstown, New Zealand

12 January 2013
13:50

Manawatu	20–15	Northland

Queenstown, New Zealand

12 January 2013
14:10

Waikato	21–31	Southland

Queenstown, New Zealand

12 January 2013
17:30

Southland	12–26	Northland

Queenstown, New Zealand

12 January 2013
17:50

Waikato	45–10	Manawatu

Queenstown, New Zealand

=== Pool D ===
Teams	Pld	W	D	L	PF	PA	+/−	Pts
Bay of Plenty	3	3	0	0	55	41	+14	9
Taranaki	3	2	0	1	61	39	+22	7
Counties Manukau	3	1	0	2	39	49	−10	5
Canterbury	3	0	0	3	39	65	−26	3

12 January 2013
10:30

Taranaki	15–10	Counties Manukau

Queenstown, New Zealand

12 January 2013
10:50

Canterbury	14–17	Bay of Plenty

Queenstown, New Zealand

12 January 2013
13:10

Taranaki	15–19	Bay of Plenty

Queenstown, New Zealand

12 January 2013
13:30

Canterbury	15–17	Counties Manukau

Queenstown, New Zealand

12 January 2013
16:50

Counties Manukau	12–19	Bay of Plenty

Queenstown, New Zealand

12 January 2013
17:10

Canterbury	10–31	Taranaki

Queenstown, New Zealand

== Knockout stage ==
=== Shield ===
Quarter-finals
13 January – Queenstown
Tasman	34
Wairarapa Bush	0
13 January – Queenstown
Counties Manukau	12
Manawatu	17
13 January – Queenstown
Waikato	19
Canterbury	7
13 January – Queenstown
Hawke's Bay	47
South Canterbury	0

Semi-finals
13 January – Queenstown
Wairarapa Bush	19
Counties Manukau	36
13 January – Queenstown
Canterbury	29
South Canterbury	10

Final
13 January – Queenstown
Counties Manukau	27
Canterbury	12

=== Bowl ===
Quarter-finals
13 January – Queenstown
Tasman	34
Wairarapa Bush	0
13 January – Queenstown
Counties Manukau	12
Manawatu	17
13 January – Queenstown
Waikato	19
Canterbury	7
13 January – Queenstown
Hawke's Bay	47
South Canterbury	0

Semi-finals
13 January – Queenstown
Tasman	7
Manawatu	38
13 January – Queenstown
Waikato	12
Hawke's Bay	35

Final
13 January – Queenstown
Manawatu	7
Hawke's Bay	40

=== Plate ===
Quarter-finals
13 January – Queenstown
Auckland	19
North Harbour	21
13 January – Queenstown
Bay of Plenty	28
Southland	19
13 January – Queenstown
Northland	10
Taranaki	27
13 January – Queenstown
Otago	21
Wellington	7

Semi-finals
13 January – Queenstown
Auckland	26
Southland	12
13 January – Queenstown
Northland	14
Wellington	22

Final
13 January – Queenstown
Auckland	40
Wellington	20

=== Cup ===
Quarter-finals
13 January – Queenstown
Auckland	19
North Harbour	21
13 January – Queenstown
Bay of Plenty	28
Southland	19
13 January – Queenstown
Northland	10
Taranaki	27
13 January – Queenstown
Otago	21
Wellington	7

Semi-finals
13 January – Queenstown
North Harbour	24
Bay of Plenty	14
13 January – Queenstown
Taranaki	17
Otago	7

Final
13 January – Queenstown
North Harbour	17
Taranaki	32
