= 2009 New Zealand National Rugby Sevens Tournament =

The 2009 New Zealand National Rugby Sevens Tournament (more commonly known as the 2009 Pub Charity Sevens tournament) was held in Queenstown, New Zealand, between 10 and 11 January 2009. It was the 33rd edition of the New Zealand National Rugby Sevens Tournament and the sixth time that it was held in Queenstown.

Heading into the tournament, Auckland were the defending champions, having previously won the tournament four consecutive times. But a lost in the quarter-finals to Counties Manukau meant that they wouldn't get a fifth in a row losing 31–0. In the final, it was North Harbour that claimed the trophy for the eighth time as they defeated Counties Manukau in the final 29–26.

== Pool stages ==
=== Pool A ===
- Auckland
- Canterbury
- Wellington
- Otago Country

=== Pool B ===
- Counties Manukau
- North Harbour
- Northland
- Southland

=== Pool C ===
- Taranaki
- Bay of Plenty
- Hawke's Bay
- West Coast

=== Pool D ===
- Otago
- Manawatu
- Waikato
- Horowhenua-Kapiti

== Knockout ==
=== Shield ===
Southland 28–21 Northland

=== Bowl ===
Otago 33–10 Horowhenua-Kapiti

=== Plate ===
Wellington 38–33 Taranaki

=== Cup ===
Quarter-finals
11 January – Queenstown
North Harbour	22
Wellington	19
11 January – Queenstown
Waikato	19
Bay of Plenty	12
11 January – Queenstown
Counties Manukau	31
Auckland	0
11 January – Queenstown
Manawatu	19
Taranaki	7

Semi-finals
11 January – Queenstown
North Harbour	34
Waikato	19
11 January – Queenstown
Counties Manukau	29
Manawatu	5

Final
11 January – Queenstown
North Harbour	29
Counties Manukau	26
