= Frank Brinsden =

New Zealand World War II fighter pilot

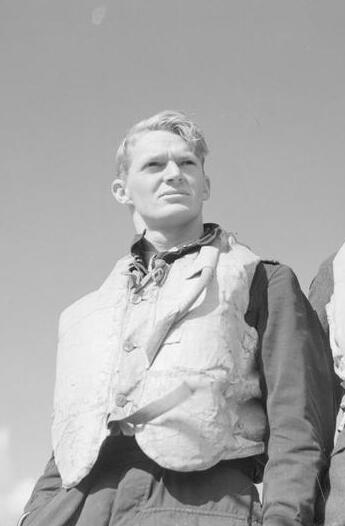
- Born: 27 March 1919; Auckland, New Zealand
- Died: November 1993 (aged 74)
- Military career
- Allegiance: United Kingdom
- Branch: Royal Air Force
- Service years: 1939–1944, 1947–1966 (RAF); 1944–1947 (RNZAF)
- Rank: Wing Commander
- Nickname: 'Fanny'
- Commands: No. 3 Aircraft Delivery Unit; No. 3 Missing Research and Enquiry Unit; No. 141 Squadron; RAF West Malling
- Conflicts: Second World War: Battle of France; Battle of Britain; Malayan Emergency

Francis Noel Brinsden (27 March 1919 – November 1993) was a New Zealand fighter pilot who served with the Royal Air Force (RAF) during the Second World War. He is credited with destroying at least three aircraft.

From Auckland, Brinsden joined the RAF on a short service commission in 1937 and was serving with No. 19 Squadron on the outbreak of the Second World War. Flying the Supermarine Spitfire fighter, he shot down a number of German aircraft during sorties to support the evacuation of the British Expeditionary Force from Dunkirk during the period late May to early June 1940 and was also involved with the squadron's campaign in the Battle of Britain. He served in a variety of postings over the next two years. Shot down while flying a de Havilland Mosquito fighter-bomber of No. 25 Squadron during a sortie over Holland on 17 August 1943, he went into captivity as a prisoner of war until the end of hostilities in Europe. He remained in the RAF in the postwar period, and spent part of his later career serving in the Malayan Emergency. He retired in 1966 in the rank of wing commander and in his later years lived in Western Australia. He died in November 1993, aged 74.

== Early life ==
Francis Noel Brinsden, known as Frank, was born in Auckland, New Zealand, on 27 March 1919. Educated at Takapuna Grammar School, he worked in the banking industry once his education was completed. In 1937, he was a successful applicant for a short service commission in the Royal Air Force (RAF) and left New Zealand aboard the RMS Arawa for the United Kingdom in August. He commenced training as a pilot at No. 7 Elementary and Reserve Flying Training School at Desford in late September, proceeding to No. 3 Flying Training School at South Cerney at the end of the year, having been commissioned as a probationary pilot officer.

In July 1938, Brinsden, who was nicknamed 'Fanny' in RAF service, was posted to No. 19 Squadron as a pilot officer but an excess of pilots meant that he was sent straight onto a navigation course. A few months later he returned to the squadron. He was duly confirmed in his pilot officer rank. No. 19 Squadron was based at Duxford and operated Supermarine Spitfire fighters, having been the first unit in the RAF to receive the type.

== Second World War ==
On the outbreak of the Second World War, No. 19 Squadron commenced protective patrols over shipping convoys plying the east coast, a duty which it performed for several months. For a brief period in early 1940, the well-known amputee fighter pilot Douglas Bader served with the squadron. Brinsden was the pilot who briefed Bader on the cockpit controls of the Spitfire before the latter commenced his first flight in the aircraft. Bader blamed his subsequent wheels up landing on Brinsden not having shown him how to lower the undercarriage of the Spitfire, an accusation which Brinsden denied, and also pointed out the ready availability of pilot notes for the Spitfire in the squadron's mess. Bader left the squadron in April, Brinsden not expressing any remorse at his departure.

=== Dunkirk ===
In late May, No. 19 Squadron moved to Hornchurch from where it was involved in providing aerial cover over the beaches at Dunkirk during Operation Dynamo, the evacuation of the British Expeditionary Force from France. On its first sortie to Dunkirk, on 26 May, the squadron engaged several Junkers Ju 87 dive bombers and shot down several of these before being driven off by the appearance of Messerschmitt Bf 109 fighters. Brinsden, now in the rank of flying officer, destroyed one Ju 87 and shared in the destruction of a second. Further sorties were flown until 5 June, at which time the squadron returned to Duxford.

=== Battle of Britain ===
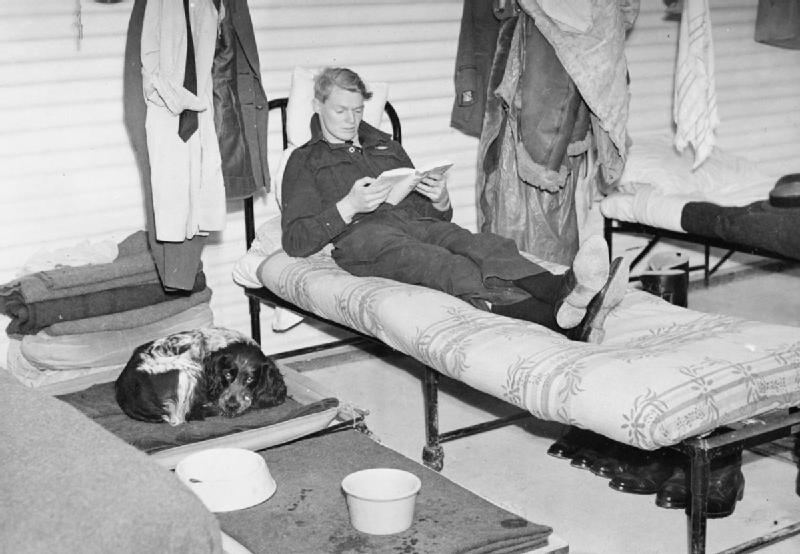
Brinsden relaxing in the pilot's accommodation facilities at Fowlmere, September 1940

In July No. 19 Squadron moved to Fowlmere, a satellite airfield to Duxford, and resumed convoy patrols. It also began to be called upon to provide aerial cover for the airfields of No. 11 Group and flew as part of the Duxford Wing. On one scramble, carried out on 31 August, he was shot down during an engagement with a Messerschmitt Bf 110 heavy fighter. He safely baled out of his Spitfire. On 9 September he shared in the probable destruction of a Heinkel He 111 medium bomber. In November Brinsden was posted to the Polish No. 303 Squadron as an acting flight lieutenant in charge of one the unit's flights. When Polish officers arrived to assume the roles of flight leaders, Brinsden became the squadron's liaison officer with the RAF. When Brinsden joined the Hawker Hurricane fighter-equipped squadron, it was based at Leconfield but January 1941 moved to Northolt and began to take part in offensive operations to German-occupied Europe. Brinsden flew one such sortie on 22 January, shooting up an aerodrome and ground troops. Soon afterwards, the squadron began converting to Spitfires.

In late March 1941, Brinsden's substantive rank was made up to flight lieutenant and he was posted to No. 485 (NZ) Squadron, the first of the New Zealand Article XV squadrons. Based at RAF Driffield, in Yorkshire, where it was being formed, he was one of its flight commanders. The squadron became operation in April and two months later, Brinsden was involved in the squadron's first encounter with the Luftwaffe when, on 2 June, he unsuccessfully engaged a Junkers Ju 88 medium bomber.

=== Later war service ===
After serving with the squadron for three months, in late July Brinsden was posted to the RAF's Merchant Ship Fighter Unit (MSFU) in the role of Port Loading Officer at Speke. Responsible for the loading of Hurricanes and their crews onto CAM ships, he performed this duty for several months. During this time, he also trained in catapult-launches. Brinsden was promoted to temporary squadron leader in June 1942 and two months later was given command of No. 3 Aircraft Delivery Unit, based at High Ercall. This was responsible for ferrying fighters from their airfields to maintenance facilities. In February 1943 Brinsden was posted to No. 54 Operational Training Unit at Charterhall to train in night fighter operations.

Two months later Brinsden proceeded to No. 25 Squadron. This was equipped with the de Havilland Mosquito heavy fighter and flying from Church Fenton, was engaged in Ranger missions to German-occupied Europe. Later in the year, it was employed on bomber support operations as part of No. 100 Group. On 17 August Brinsden was flying a Mosquito alongside RAF heavy bombers attacking Peenemünde in north eastern Germany. Having an initial patrol to clear the way for the bombers, he decided to make a low level attack on the airfield at Sylt. During the course of bombing the hangars there, he became disorientated by bright searchlights and flew so low over the sea as he made his getaway that the propellers of his Mosquito struck the water. Forced to ditch in the sea, he and his navigator took to a life raft. After several hours drifting just off the coastline, the life raft came ashore where the two RAF personnel were captured by German troops. He spent the remainder of hostilities in Europe as a prisoner of war in Stalag Luft III.

== Postwar career ==
Repatriated to the United Kingdom in May 1945, in the immediate postwar period, Brinsden was commander of No. 3 Missing Research and Enquiry Unit which sought to locate the graves of missing RAF personnel. During his confinement as a prisoner of war, his short service commission in the RAF had ended and he had officially been transferred to the Royal New Zealand Air Force as a squadron leader. Promoted to wing commander in July 1946, early the following year he returned to New Zealand for a holiday. While there, he found that he had secured a permanent commission in the RAF as a flight lieutenant, which took effect from June 1947.

Returning to the United Kingdom, Brinsden underwent a night fighter course after refresher training at Finningley. In July 1948 and having promoted to squadron leader, he was given command of No. 141 Squadron. This was based at Coltishall and was equipped with Mosquitos. In 1951 Brinsden was posted to British Malaya as a staff officer in the headquarters of the Far East Air Force at Changi. During the Malayan Emergency he coordinated air strikes from Kuala Lumpur against the Communist guerillas as well as organising supply drops for ground troops.

After his service in Malaya concluded Brinsden returned to the United Kingdom where he took command of a flight of Lockheed P-2 Neptune maritime patrol aircraft that was engaged in radar experiments. Promoted to wing commander at the start of 1954, he spent the next five years stationed at a series of radar stations in Scotland and England. He briefly commanded the RAF station at West Malling in March 1959 before reverting to an administrative role when the appointment was upgraded to group captain rank. From 1961 to 1963 he served at the Ministry of Supply in Melbourne, Australia, involved in the British commitment to Woomera Rocket Range as part of the Anglo-Australian Joint Project. His final posting was at the Ministry of Aviation in London as a staff officer.

== Later life ==
Brinsden retired from the RAF in December 1966 and his later years were spent in Western Australia. He died in November 1993 at the age of 74.
