= Pat Crowley (rugby union) =

- Born: Patrick Joseph Bourke Crowley; 20 October 1923 Whanganui, New Zealand
- Died: 9 June 1981 (aged 57) Auckland, New Zealand
- Height: 188 cm (6 ft 2 in)
- Weight: 90 kg (200 lb)
- School: St. Pat's (Silverstream)
- Notable relative: Cheree Crowley (grand-daughter)

Rugby union career
- Position: Flanker
Provincial / State sides
Years	Team	Apps	(Points)
1946–1950	Auckland	34	
International career
Years	Team	Apps	(Points)
1949–1950	New Zealand	21	(12)

Patrick Joseph Bourke Crowley (20 October 1923 – 9 June 1981) was a New Zealand rugby union player. A flanker, Crowley represented Auckland at a provincial level, and was a member of the New Zealand national rugby union team, from 1949 to 1950.

== Career ==
At the age of 19, Crowley made his first class debut for an army division team in 1943. He then went on to represent Auckland from 1946 to 1950, making thirty-four appearances for the provincial side. In his first season with Auckland, he would also play for the North Island team in the annual North vs South rugby union match. Crowley played for the North Island every year afterward, apart from 1949.

His performances saw him being called up for the national side, making his debut for the All Blacks during their tour of South Africa in 1949. The following year, he was part of the squad to face the British Lions in their tour of New Zealand and Australia. In an interview with The Scotsman, Angus Black was complimentary of the flanker, recalling: "Crowley was very good. I spent most of my day getting tackled hard. I was up in the air more often than I was on the ground. Crowley sorted us all out." The third test was to be Crowley's career defining performance as an All Black. Due to injuries, New Zealand had to play much of the match with six forwards, and Crowley ended having to do the work of two men instead of one. Crowley scored two tries against the Lions, the first was in the second test, and the second was when he was playing for Auckland.

Crowley retired from rugby union later that year at the age of 26, having played sixty-four first class matches.

== Personal life ==
Crowley was the grandfather of professional wrestler Cheree Crowley, better known by the ring names Evie and Dakota Kai.
