= Gus Spillane =

NZ rugby union player (1888–1974)

- Born: Augustine Patrick Spillane; 10 May 1888 Geraldine, New Zealand
- Died: 16 September 1974 (aged 86) Timaru, New Zealand
- Occupation: Farmer

Rugby union career
- Position(s): First five-eighth Second five-eighth
Provincial / State sides
Years	Team	Apps	(Points)
1911–23	South Canterbury	35	
International career
Years	Team	Apps	(Points)
1913	New Zealand	2	(0)

Augustine Patrick Spillane (10 May 1888 – 16 September 1974) was a New Zealand rugby union player. Gus Spillane came from a Temuka rugby family of Irish descent and one steeped in rugby. Three of his brothers also represented South Canterbury with one, Charles, later moving to Wanganui and Taranaki and becoming prominent in refereeing and administration. The Spillane Cup, the traditional trophy competed for at Easter by North Island Marist clubs, is named after Charles Spillane. Primarily a tidyfirst five-eighth, Spillane represented South Canterbury at a provincial level, and was a member of the New Zealand national side, the All Blacks, in 1913. He appeared in two matches for the All Blacks, both of them internationals against the touring Australian team, in which he played at second-five eighth.

He also captained South Canterbury against the tourists midweek between the Dunedin and Christchurch tests. <Profile by Lindsay Knight for the New Zealand Rugby Museum>.

Between 1911, when he was 23, and 1923, when he was 35, he played 21 matches for South Canterbury. Much of this span was of course interrupted by World War I.

George Gaffaney, also a South Canterbury and South Island five eighths of the 1930s, recalled playing against Spillane while a young man and spoke glowingly of his talent.

Said Gaffaney of Spillane: "A wily tactician with an uncanny ability to extricate himself and his team from awkward situations. Spillane, by his very presence, was worth several points to any Temuka team - even before the match started."

He died in Timaru in 1974, and was buried at Temuka Cemetery.
