= Missing Research and Enquiry Service =

Former RAF non-flying unit

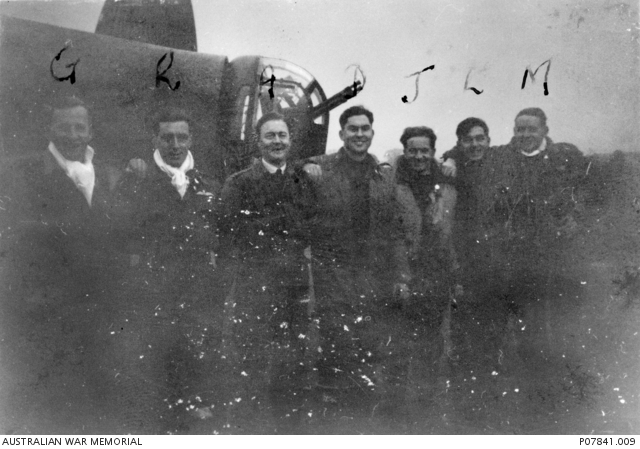
- No. 463 Squadron RAAF Lancaster aircrew Waddington November 1944. This aircrew were posted as missing on operations.
- Founded: October 1944
- Disbanded: 1949
- Branch: Royal Air Force
- Type: Investigative unit
- Size: 620 staff

Missing Research and Enquiry Service (or MRES), was a post-Second World War Royal Air Force secretariat that looked into those service personnel in the RAF who were listed as missing in action during operations in the Second World War. The MRES was part of the Air Ministry's Casualty Branch, and was initially set up in 1944, with a dedicated branch established in 1945. It covered many areas of Europe and North Africa, before being disestablished in 1949.

== History ==
The Casualty Branch of the Royal Air Force was established upon the outbreak of war in September 1939. Within the Casualty Branch, a separate office called the Missing Research Section (MRS) was established in January 1942, which had to operate from within offices in the United Kingdom until D-Day, when the MRES became an official entity. During RAF operations in the Second World War, 42,000 personnel were listed as "missing, believed killed". The desire towards the end of the war to retrieve dead air force personnel, or to give some information on missing aircrew to their relatives, led to the creation of the MRES in 1944.

Initially eight Missing Research Sections were established to cover North-Western Europe, but this later was amalgamated into four units (MREU), with a fifth in Italy covering Southern Europe and the Mediterranean. Investigations were also undertaken in the Far East. The task was to trace and account for all Royal Air Force and Dominion personnel who had been lost, not declared dead or as a PoW, in any theatre of war between 1939 and 1945. Service personnel on the MREU in Italy were required to wear civilian clothes and remove all military insignia from their vehicles. This was enforced by the Italian authorities, and was not mirrored by their North-Western Europe counterparts who were viewed either as liberators, or one of the four powers governing Germany at that time. Many of the staff allocated to, or who volunteered for the MREUs, recall that training was almost non-existent. A stark contrast to those who worked on war crimes investigations and who were required to have a formal investigative, scientific, or medical background.

Whilst casualty numbers fluctuated, it was established that the number of missing stood at 41,881. (Note: The total number of dead from the RAF was listed as 69,606, with the bulk of that number (55,500) came "overwhelmingly" from RAF Bomber Command.) This was the final figure accounted for in 1947, and was confirmed as accurate in 1951. The statistics were divided between North-West Europe (37,000) and the Mediterranean (5,000). However this number was downgraded by 40% to 25,200. The 40% rate was an adjustment for those who were lost at sea, for whom no viable exhumation or investigation was deemed possible. The MRES also had a secondary function to locate the graves of tens of thousands more aircrew who had either been buried by the Axis forces, or by British forces after the D-Day landings. This additional task was daunting for those working on the MREUs; one report detailed how an aircraft crash, a Blenheim shot down over a raid on Wilhelmshaven in September 1939, killed all four crew, but the state of their injuries meant that the Axis troops buried them altogether. A memo detailed how the men "had disintegrated in the crash."

The elapsed time between the deaths, burials and then decomposition of the bodies, meant that the staff on the MREUs had a difficult and unpleasant task. If the aircrew had been inside an aircraft when it crashed, their deaths were often violent. What did help was the collation of lists by the opposing side (Totenlisten), which was sent to Britain via the Red Cross and included deaths, injuries and place of burial (if known). One MREU working in France discovered the grave of Richard 'Dick' Tedder, the pilot son of Arthur Tedder. His Blenheim was shot down and exploded in a wood near Nacqueville, and the three-man crew were buried there. The gravesite was badly overgrown in 1947 when an officer from the MREU arrive to investigate, and all three bodies were removed to the British Military Cemetery at Caen in February 1948.

No. 1 MREU operated in France, No. 2 in Belgium, The Netherlands and Czechoslovakia, No. 3 in Norway and Denmark, No. 4 in Germany and Poland, and No. 5 in the Mediterranean and the Middle East.

At its peak, the MRES had a staff of 620 (both officers and other ranks) and covered all of Europe from Norway to the Mediterranean. The Air Member for Personnel was keen to involve the Dominions who had contributed to the Air Power effort in the Second World War, and they asked for help in terms of search officers, drivers and clerks. In 1945, the breakdown of the MRES was 69% RAF, 17% RCAF, 7% RAAF, 3% RNZAF, and 4% from other overseas states (but not the United States). By 1949, over 82% of those buried in graves marked "unknown airmen", had been identified. The MRES was disbanded in 1949, though some RAF personnel were still employed to look into any further cases of unknown airmen until 1952 as the Missing Research and Graves Service (MRGS).

== Notable personnel ==
- Hubert Brooks, RCAF officer who worked for MRES after the war
- Frank Brinsden, RNZAF officer who commanded No. 3 MRES after the war
