= Allan Stewart (rugby union) =

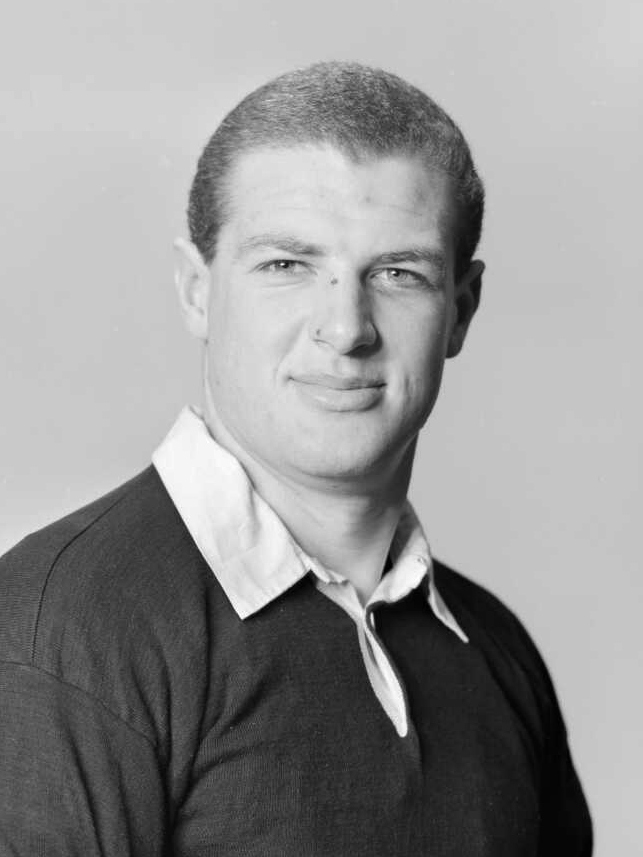
- Stewart in 1962
- Born: Allan James Stewart; 11 October 1940 (age 86) Timaru, New Zealand
- Height: 1.95 m (6 ft 5 in)
- Weight: 102 kg (225 lb)
- School: Timaru Technical College
- University: University of Canterbury
- Occupation: Oil company executive

Rugby union career
- Position: Lock
Provincial / State sides
Years	Team	Apps	(Points)
1960, 1964	South Canterbury	20	
1961–63	Canterbury	34	
International career
Years	Team	Apps	(Points)
1963–64	New Zealand	8	(0)

Allan James Stewart (born 11 October 1940) is a former New Zealand rugby union player.

A lock, Stewart played for Timaru Old Boys before he represented South Canterbury and Canterbury at a provincial level, and was a member of the New Zealand national side, the All Blacks, from 1963 to 1964. He played 26 matches for the All Blacks including eight internationals.
