= Eric Boggs =

New Zealand rugby union player and coach

Eric Boggs QSM
- Full name: Eric George Boggs
- Born: 28 March 1922 Whangārei, New Zealand
- Died: 16 October 2004 (aged 82) Auckland, New Zealand
- Height: 1.78 m (5 ft 10 in)
- Weight: 82 kg (181 lb)
- School: Otahuhu Technical High School
- Notable relative: Trent Croad (grandson)
- Occupation: School principal

Rugby union career
- Position: Wing
Provincial / State sides
Years	Team	Apps	(Points)
1942–1943	Wellington		
1944–1950	Auckland	42	(114)
International career
Years	Team	Apps	(Points)
1946–1949	New Zealand	2	(0)

Eric George Boggs QSM (28 March 1922 — 16 October 2004) was a New Zealand rugby union player and coach. He was a winger in the New Zealand national rugby union team, the All Blacks, in 1946 and 1946, and later coached Ponsonby and the Auckland provincial side. A schoolteacher by training, he was also principal of a number of primary and intermediate schools in Auckland.

== Early life and family ==
Boggs was born Whangārei on 28 March 1922, the son of Samuel George Boggs and Gladys Rose Boggs (née Sparks). The family moved to Papatoetoe when he was six years old, and he was educated at Otahuhu Technical High School. At school, he was prominent in athletics, winning the school championships for the 880 yards, high jump and triple jump in 1939. He also captained his school rugby 1st XV in 1938 and 1939, and played senior hockey for Papatoetoe from the age of 14. He was a member of the Auckland 'B' representative hockey team in 1939 and 1940.

Boggs undertook teacher training at Auckland Teachers' Training College from 1940, and played senior club cricket for the Training College as an top-order batsman and bowler from the 1940–1941 season.

In January 1945, Boggs' engagement to Annie Marjory (Nancy) Gow was announced. Boggs embarked for overseas service in 1945 with the rank of lance corporal in infantry reinforcements for the 2nd New Zealand Expeditionary Force (2NZEF). After his return to New Zealand after the war, Bogg married Nancy Gow on 25 January 1947, and they went on to have three children.

== Rugby union career ==
Boggs was a winger and played his early rugby for the Training College club of Auckland. He was a member of the "Kiwis" team, made up of 2NZEF soldiers, that toured Britain, France and Germany for the 1945–46 Victory Internationals, scoring 15 tries in 22 matches.

After returning home, Boggs turned out for Auckland and won All Blacks selection for the 2nd Test against the Wallabies at Eden Park in 1946. He scored an Auckland rugby record 20 tries for his club Ponsonby as they claimed the 1948 championship and earned a place on the All Blacks squad for the following year's tour of South Africa, where he gained a second cap in the Test against the Springboks at Newlands.

Boggs coached Ponsonby to the Gallaher Shield title in 1954 and had two stints as selector–coach of Auckland, including successful Ranfurly Shield defence from 1974 to 1976.

A school teacher by profession, Boggs served as the headmaster of Manukau Intermediate School between 1970 and 1986. In the 1980 New Year Honours, he received the Queen's Service Medal for public services.

Boggs was the grandfather of Australian Football League player Trent Croad.

== See also ==
- List of New Zealand national rugby union players
