= Dick Stewart (rugby union) =

NZ rugby union player (1871–1931)

- Born: David Taylor Stewart; 24 January 1871 Pigeon Bay, Banks Peninsula, New Zealand
- Died: 1 August 1931 (aged 60) Orari, New Zealand
- Occupation: Farmer

Rugby union career
- Position: Loose forward
Provincial / State sides
| Years | Team | Apps | (Points) |
| 1890–96 | South Canterbury | 15 | |
International career
| Years | Team | Apps | (Points) |
| 1894 | New Zealand | 0 | (0) |

David Taylor "Dick" Stewart (24 January 1871 – 1 August 1931) was a New Zealand rugby union player. A loose forward, Stewart represented South Canterbury at a provincial level, making 15 appearances for the team between 1890 and 1896. He played just one match for the New Zealand national side, against New South Wales at Lancaster Park in Christchurch.

Born at Pigeon Bay on Banks Peninsula on 24 January 1871, Stewart moved with his family to Orari in South Canterbury when he was six months old. He was educated at Winchester and Orari Schools, and was active in the Presbyterian church in the district throughout his life. He married Edith Grace Bates in 1898, and the couple had two sons, including Doug Stewart, who played 28 matches for South Canterbury between 1921 and 1927 and was a New Zealand triallist in 1927. Dick Stewart died at his farm, "Birchbank", at Orari on 1 August 1931, and was buried at Temuka Cemetery.
