= Takapuna Grammar School =

Secondary school in Auckland

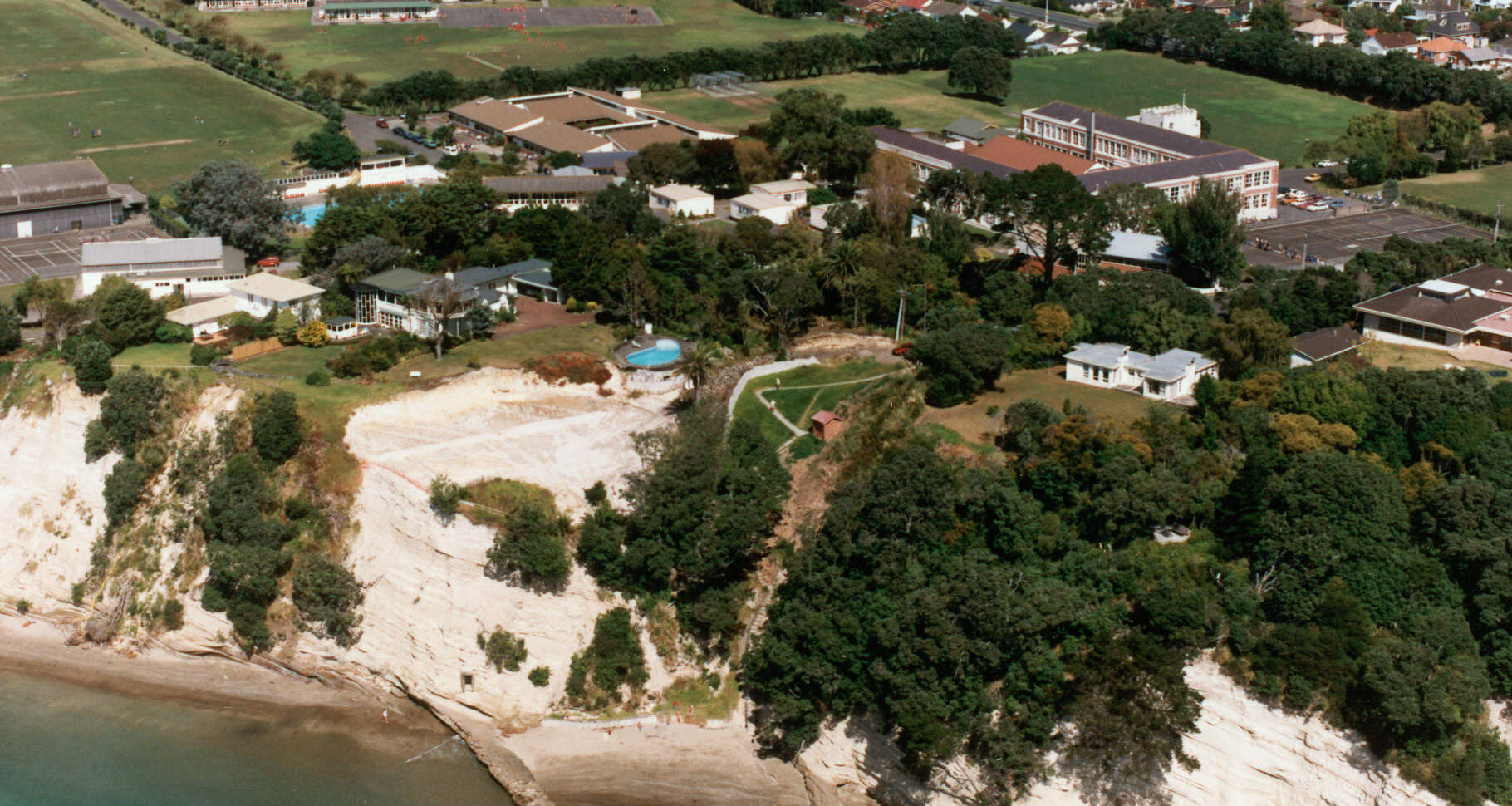
- Takapuna Grammar School in 1992, above the cliffs of Saint Leonards Beach

Location
- 210 Lake Road; Belmont; Auckland 0622; New Zealand; 36.8011°S 174.7886°E

Information
- Type: State Co-educational Secondary (Years 9–13)
- Motto: Per Angusta Ad Augusta "Through endeavour to greatness"
- Established: 1927
- Ministry of Education Institution no.: 36
- Principal: Mary Nixon
- Enrolment: 2,265 (July 2026)
- Socio-economic decile: 10Z
- Website: www.takapuna.school.nz

Takapuna Grammar School is a state coeducational secondary school located in the suburb of Belmont on the North Shore of Auckland, New Zealand. Established in 1927, the school mainly serves the eponymous suburb of Takapuna and the entire Devonport Peninsula. A total of 2,265 students from Years 9 to 13 (ages 12 to 18) attend the school as of July 2026.

== History ==
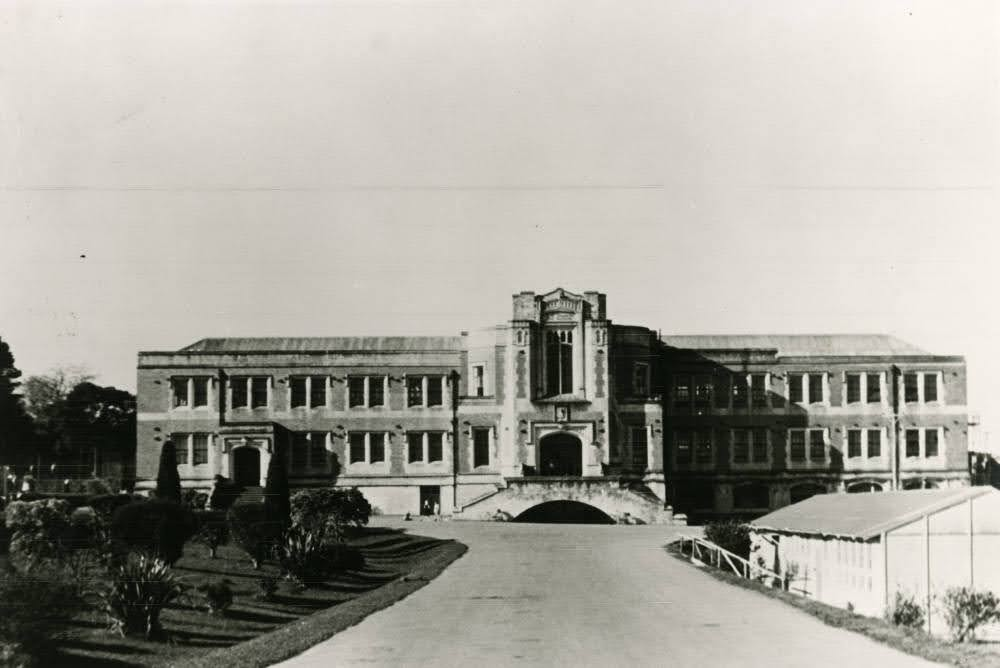
Takapuna Grammar Main Building

The foundation stone of Takapuna Grammar was laid on 6 April 1926, and the school officially opened for its first academic year on 7 February 1927, with an initial enrolment of over 200 students. Takapuna Grammar School was the first co-educational school under the auspices of the Auckland Grammar School's Board, and established its own Board of Governors in 1955. The school retained the Auckland Grammar Lion and the motto "Per Angusta Ad Augusta" ("Through endeavour to greatness").

== Development ==
In the 2000s, a $6.4 million ministry-funded three-stage upgrade began at the school. The three-level building houses social science classrooms, a new library, and student service and social support centres were completed in the second term of 2009. In late 2015, it was announced that $26 million redevelopment of the school's main block was to commence the following year. The main block, which was initially built in 1927 upon the school's establishment, was described by local MP Maggie Barry as an "appalling sight." The redevelopment of the main block coincided with similar work being done on the school's science block, which was completed mid-2016. The work on the main building, described as one of the most expensive in New Zealand's history, was completed in 2020.

== Enrolment ==
Like many secondary schools in Auckland, Takapuna Grammar School operates an enrolment scheme to help curb roll numbers and prevent overcrowding. The school's enrolment zone, in which students residing are automatically entitled to be enrolled without rejection, covers the suburbs of Devonport, Narrow Neck, Bayswater, Belmont, Hauraki, Takapuna and parts of Milford. Students residing outside the zone are accepted as roll places allow per the enrolment scheme order of preference and secret ballot, with siblings of current students getting first preference.

At the August 2011 Education Review Office (ERO) review of the school, Takapuna Grammar School had 1420 students, including 195 international students. Fifty-three percent of students were male and 47 percent were female. Sixty-five percent of students at the school identified as New Zealand European (Pākehā), nine percent as British or Irish, five percent as Māori, five percent as Korean, and three percent as Chinese.

As of July 2026, Takapuna Grammar School has roll of 2,265 students, of which 183 (8.1%) identify as Māori.

As of 2026, the school has an Equity Index of 393, placing it amongst schools whose students have the fewest socioeconomic barriers to achievement (roughly equivalent to deciles 9 and 10 under the former socio-economic decile system).

== Curriculum ==
As a state school, Takapuna Grammar School follows The New Zealand Curriculum. Students in Year 11 complete the National Certificate of Educational Achievement (NCEA) level 1. In Years 12 and 13, students can continue with NCEA levels 2 and 3, or complete the International Baccalaureate (IB) Diploma Programme.

== Notable students and alumni ==
- Finn Andrews – songwriter/musician, The Veils
- Geoff Baylis - Foundation pupil, DUX 1930 & 1931, UE Scholar 1931 - botanist and Emeritus Professor
- Sir Peter Blake – yachtsman
- Barry Brickell OBE – potter and conservationist
- Frank Brinsden - RAF fighter pilot during the Second World War
- Sophia Burn – musician, The Veils
- Howard Charles Clark – academic
- Hon Bruce Cliffe – cabinet minister
- Murray Deaker – deputy principal, radio host and television presenter
- Grace Gooder – New Zealand cricketer
- Jacko Gill – shotputter
- Juliette Haigh – rower
- Paul Hitchcock – cricketer
- Gary Hurring – swimmer
- Brad Johnstone – rugby coach
- Marty Johnstone – (Mr Asia) murdered drug dealer
- Richard Jones – cricketer
- Eliza McCartney – pole vaulter
- Danny Morrison – cricketer
- Paul Moss – general manager of Media Prima network, judge in 8TV's One in a Million singing contest and Malaysian Idol
- Simon Poelman – decathlete
- Ralph Roberts – yachtsman
- Pamela Stephenson – Pamela Helen Stephenson Connolly – clinical psychologist, writer and actress
- Bert Sutcliffe – cricketer
- Sara Tetro – host of the TV3 NZ reality series New Zealand's Next Top Model
- Stephen Tindall – entrepreneur and founder of The Warehouse
- Pippa Wetzell – television presenter
- Gin Wigmore – singer/songwriter
- Peter Williams – Alpine Skier 2010 Winter Olympics
- Ella Yelich-O'Connor (professionally known as Lorde) – singer-songwriter
- Sean Wainui – Professional Rugby player (NZ Maori, Chiefs, Crusaders, Taranaki, Bay of Plenty)

Groups

- The Checks – musicians

== Notable former staff ==
- Ruth Aitken ONZM – 1980–1990 – English teacher – coach of the Silver Ferns 2001–2012
- Bessie Christie – painter, art teacher between 1935 and 1940
- Shaunagh Craig – Northern Ireland netball international
- Graham (Red) Delamore – Deputy headmaster mid 60s until early 70s, member of 1949 All Black touring team
- Jack Kelly – Headmaster 1970–1985, member of 1953–1954 All Black touring team
