= Isaac Ross =

New Zealand rugby union player

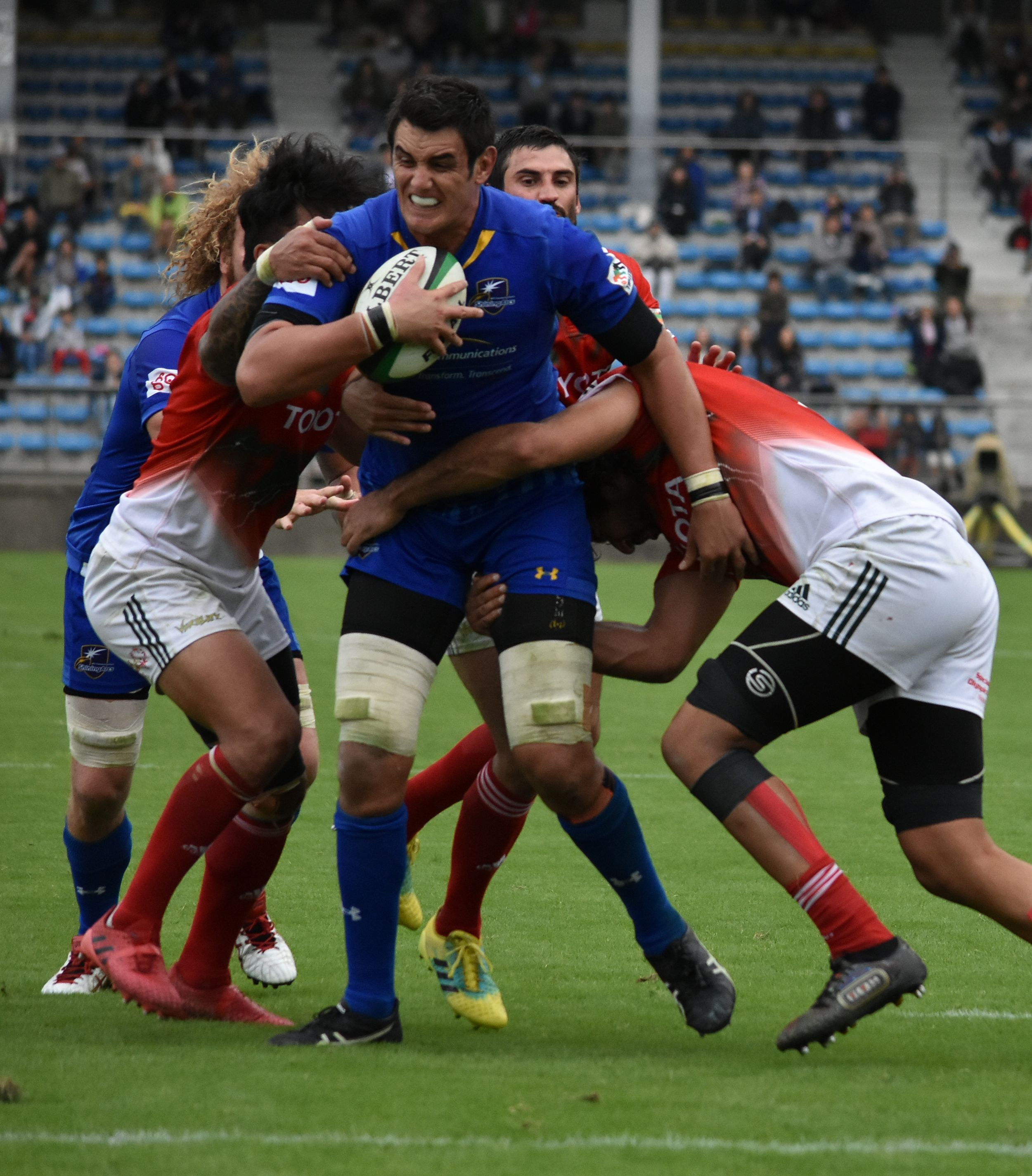
- Ross playing for the Shining Arcs Tokyo-Bay Urayasu in 2018
- Full name: Isaac Beattie Ross
- Born: 27 October 1984 (age 42) Ashburton, New Zealand
- Height: 201 cm (6 ft 7 in)
- Weight: 116 kg (256 lb; 18 st 4 lb)
- School: Timaru Boys' High School
- Notable relative(s): Christine Ross (mother); Jock Ross (father)

Rugby union career
- Position: Lock
Senior career
Years	Team	Apps	(Points)
2006–2010	Canterbury	53	(65)
2007 2009–2010	Crusaders	23	(15)
2008	Highlanders	9	(0)
2011	Chiefs	11	(5)
2011–2020	NTT Shining Arcs	100	(64)
2020	Tasman	7	(0)
2021–2022	Austin Gilgronis	24	(15)
2022	AZ-COM Maruwa MOMOTARO’S	6	(5)
2023–2024	San Diego Legion	23	(5)
- Correct as of 4 August 2024
International career
Years	Team	Apps	(Points)
2005	New Zealand U21	4	(5)
2007–2010	New Zealand Māori	8	(0)
2009	New Zealand	8	(10)
- Correct as of 4 August 2024

Isaac Beattie Ross (born 27 October 1984) is a New Zealand rugby union player. He plays in the lock position for the San Diego Legion of Major League Rugby (MLR) competition in the U.S.

== Professional career ==
Ross is of Māori descent, and played for New Zealand Māori between 2007 and 2010. He affiliates to Ngāti Kahungunu.

Ross was selected for the All Blacks in 2009. He comes from a rugby family: his father, Jock Ross, played for the All Blacks, and his mother, Christine Ross, was a member of the Black Ferns.

Ross began his professional rugby career in New Zealand, representing Canterbury in the National Provincial Championship from 2006 to 2010, making 53 appearances and scoring 13 tries.

He played Super Rugby from 2006 to 2011, representing the Crusaders, Highlanders, and Chiefs, with 43 appearances and 4 tries.

Due to the cancellation of the 2020 Top League season in Japan, Ross returned to New Zealand to play for Tasman in the Mitre 10 Cup. He helped the Mako win their premiership title, making it his fourth provincial rugby title in New Zealand.

In 2021, Ross moved to the United States to play in Major League Rugby. He joined the Austin Gilgronis as a player and forwards coach, making 46 appearances and scoring 4 tries across two seasons. When the Austin franchise folded, he signed with the San Diego Legion, finishing his professional playing career there in 2024, contributing to the team reaching the MLR final.

Ross also had a long stint in Japan with NTT Shining Arcs from 2011 to 2020, making 89 appearances and scoring 9 tries.

== Early life ==
Isaac Ross's talent was obvious from an early age and after starring in the Timaru Boys' High School top side, he played for the national secondary schools and age group sides before having the first of his 53 games for Canterbury in 2006.

Ross had an exceptional rugby pedigree. His father, Jock, a stalwart of Mid Canterbury, for whom he played more than 100 games, and also a lock and lineout expert, was an All Black tourist to France and Romania in 1981, while his mother, Christine, played for the Black Ferns.

== Super Rugby ==
Ross played Super Rugby in New Zealand from 2006 to 2011, representing the Crusaders, Highlanders, and Chiefs.

During his Super Rugby career, he made a total of 43 appearances and scored 4 tries.

His Super Rugby try scoring record includes 3 tries for the Crusaders and 1 try for the Chiefs.

== All Blacks ==
On 22 May 2009, Ross was selected for the Iveco Series 26 man All Black squad. He made his debut against France on 13 June, where he partnered his Crusaders teammate, Brad Thorn. He scored his first try against Italy in the All Blacks 27–6 win over the side on 27 June 2009.

== Outside rugby ==
Outside of rugby, Ross has been involved in community and media activities. He was recognized in the Jigsaw Family Services Extraordinary Dads campaign, which celebrated the role of fathers in children's lives.

He has also worked in television, appearing as a sports presenter on the New Zealand children's program The Erin Simpson Show and as a reporter on Māori Television.https://www.odt.co.nz/sport/rugby/rugby-ross-counter-matfield-magic

On a personal note, Ross is a father of four and is a qualified wedding celebrant.
