= Archie Strang (rugby union) =

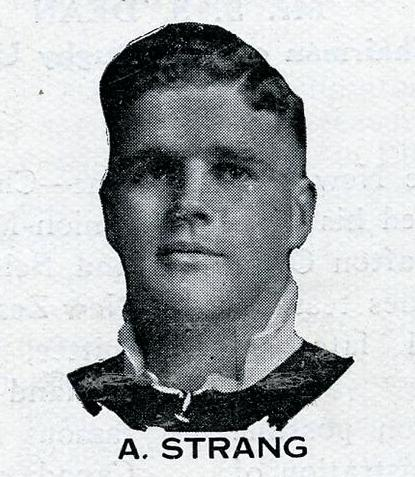
- Born: William Archibald Strang; 18 October 1906 Invercargill, New Zealand
- Died: 13 February 1989 (aged 82) Tauranga, New Zealand
- Height: 1.73 m (5 ft 8 in)
- Weight: 74 kg (163 lb)
- School: Southland Boys' High School; Timaru Boys' High School
- Occupation: Stock agent

Rugby union career
- Position(s): First five-eighth, halfback
Provincial / State sides
Years	Team	Apps	(Points)
1925–1931	South Canterbury		
International career
Years	Team	Apps	(Points)
1928–1931	New Zealand	5	(13)

William Archibald Strang (18 October 1906 – 13 February 1989) was a New Zealand rugby union player. A first five-eighth and halfback, Strang represented South Canterbury at a provincial level, and was a member of the New Zealand national side, the All Blacks, from 1928 to 1931. He played 17 matches for the All Blacks including five internationals, and captained the side in his final Test match, against Australia in 1931.

Strang served with the 2nd New Zealand Expeditionary Force (NZEF) in World War II. He later served on the South Canterbury Rugby Union, and as selector–coach for the Tauranga sub-union. He died in Tauranga on 13 February 1989, and his ashes were buried at Pyes Pa Cemetery.
