= Graham Delamore =

- Full name: Graham Wallace Delamore
- Born: 3 April 1920 Thames, New Zealand
- Died: 2 May 2008 (aged 88) North Shore, New Zealand
- Height: 1.68 m (5 ft 6 in)
- Weight: 69 kg (152 lb)
- School: Thames High School
- Occupation: School teacher

Rugby union career
- Position: Five-eighth
International career
Years	Team	Apps	(Points)
1949	New Zealand	1	(0)

Graham Wallace Delamore (3 April 1920 — 2 May 2008) was a New Zealand rugby union international.

Born in Thames, Delamore attended Thames High School and was a physical training instructor with the RNZAF in World War II. During the war, he had stints at both the Hawke's Bay and Manawatu representative teams.

Delamore, a diminutive five-eighth, began representing Wellington in 1948 and was the provincial side's only player named in the All Blacks squad for the 1949 tour of South Africa. He was capped as a first five-eighth in the 4th Test in Port Elizabeth and featured in a total of nine matches across the tour.

A school teacher by profession, Delamore had a long association with Takapuna Grammar School, where he was 1st XV coach from 1950 to 1961. He later became deputy principal of the school.

Delamore also played cricket for Hutt Valley in the Hawke Cup.

== See also ==
- List of New Zealand national rugby union players
