= Ron Stewart (rugby union) =

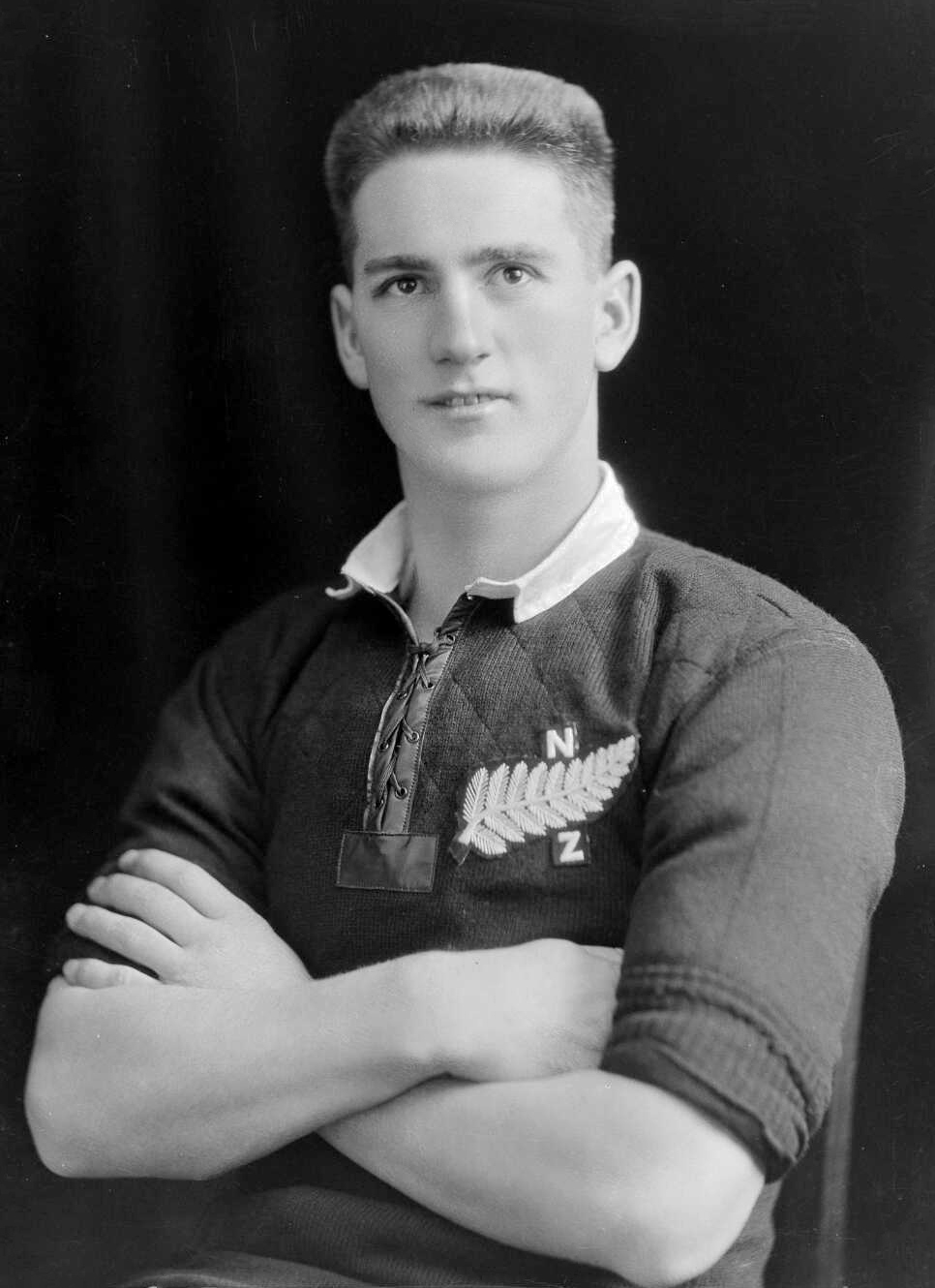
- Stewart in 1924
- Born: Ronald Terowie Stewart; 12 January 1904 Waikaia, New Zealand
- Died: 15 December 1982 (aged 78) Queenstown, New Zealand
- Height: 1.85 m (6 ft 1 in)
- Weight: 96 kg (212 lb)
- School: Timaru Boys' High School

Rugby union career
- Position: Loose forward
Provincial / State sides
Years	Team	Apps	(Points)
- South Canterbury
-	Canterbury		
International career
Years	Team	Apps	(Points)
1923–30	New Zealand	5	(3)

Ronald Terowie Stewart (12 January 1904 – 15 December 1982) was a New Zealand rugby union player. A loose forward, Stewart represented South Canterbury and Canterbury at a provincial level, and was a member of the New Zealand national side, the All Blacks, from 1923 to 1930. He played 39 matches for the All Blacks including five internationals. He was one of the selectors of the 2nd New Zealand Expeditionary Force rugby team, known as the "Kiwis", following the end of World War II, and was a Southland selector in 1950.

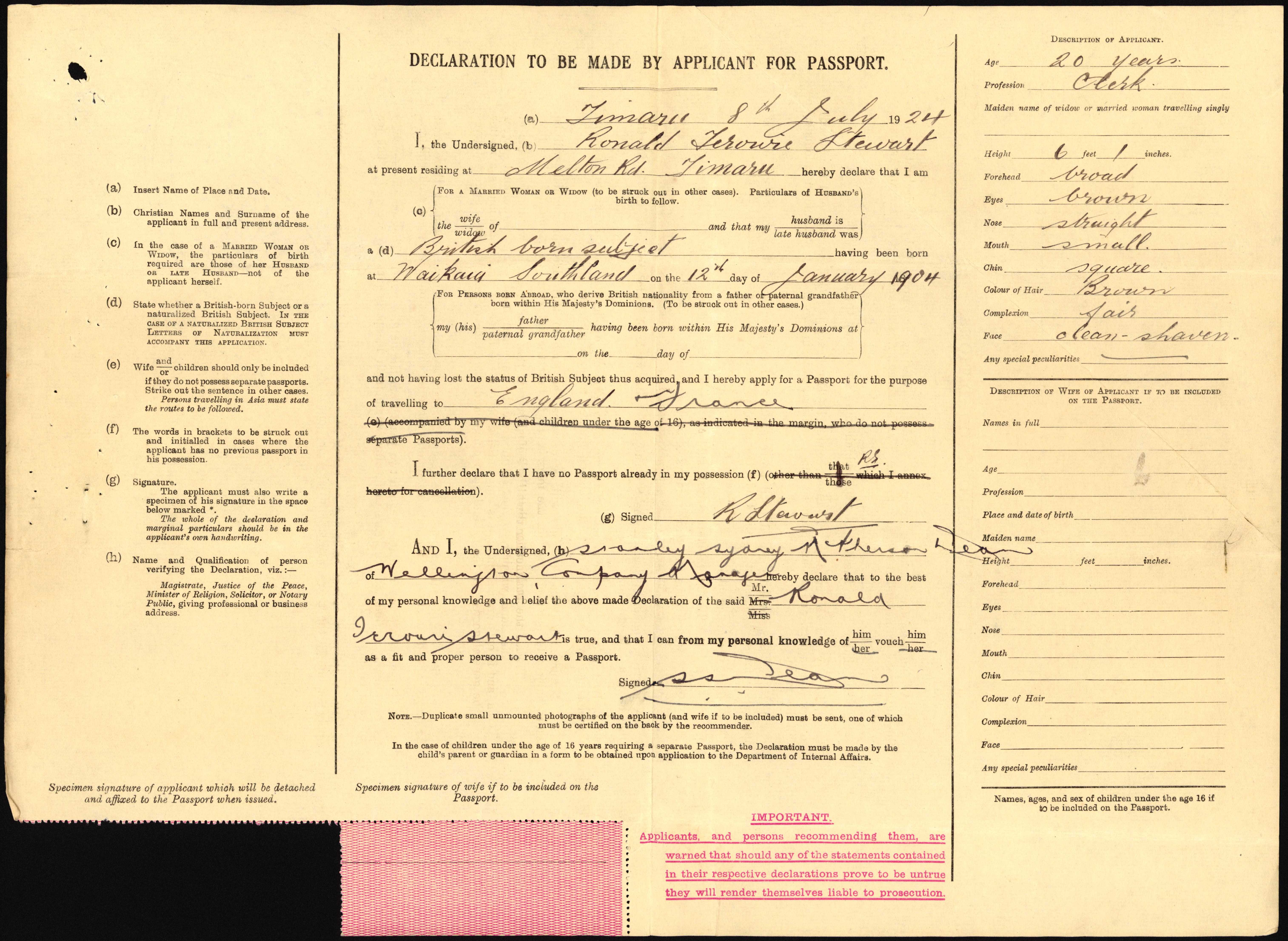
Ronald Stewart passport application (1924)
