= Jock Ross (rugby union) =

- Born: John Charles Ross; 24 April 1949 (age 77) Ashburton, New Zealand
- Height: 2.03 m (6 ft 8 in)
- Weight: 107 kg (236 lb)
- School: Timaru Boys' High School
- Notable relative: Isaac Ross (son)

Rugby union career
- Position: Lock
Provincial / State sides
Years	Team	Apps	(Points)
1970–79, 81–87	Mid Canterbury	158	
1980	Canterbury	16	
International career
Years	Team	Apps	(Points)
1981	New Zealand	0	(0)

John Charles "Jock" Ross (born 24 April 1949) is a former New Zealand rugby union player. A lock, Ross represented Mid Canterbury and, briefly, Canterbury at a provincial level, and was a member of the New Zealand national side, the All Blacks, on the 1981 tour of France and Romania. He played five matches for the All Blacks but did not appear in any internationals.
