= 2014 Bayleys National Sevens =

New Zealand rugby sevens tournament

- Host nation: New Zealand
- Date: 11–12 January 2014

The 2014 New Zealand National Rugby Sevens Tournament known as the Bayleys National Sevens was hosted in Rotorua, New Zealand, on the 11 and 12 January 2014. Matches were played at the Rotorua International Stadium. Sixteen men's and ten women's provincial teams qualified to compete in the annual national tournament following three regional tournaments (Southern, Central and Northern regions) in November and December.

== Format ==
Teams from the 26 Provincial Unions had to qualify to attend the National Event in Rotorua. The teams were divided into pools of four teams, and they played a round-robin within each pool. The top two teams in each pool advanced to the Cup competition. The four quarterfinal losers dropped into the bracket for the Plate. The Bowl was contested by the third- and fourth-place finishers in each pool, with the losers in the Bowl quarterfinals dropping into the bracket for the Shield.

== Teams ==
The qualification series started at Fraser Park in Timaru on the 23 November 2013 for the Southern region. Then the Central region qualification was played on 7 December 2013 at the Massey University Rugby Institute in Palmerston North. The series finished in Hamilton at Waikato Stadium on 14 December 2013 for the Northern region qualification.

=== Southern region ===
- Canterbury
- Southland
- Tasman
- Mid Canterbury
- Otago

=== Central region ===
- Hawke's Bay
- Taranaki
- Manawatu
- Wellington
- Poverty Bay

=== Northern region ===
- Auckland
- Northland
- Counties Manukau
- Waikato
- North Harbour
- Bay of Plenty

== Pool stage ==
The first round, or pool stage, saw 16 men's teams divided into four pools of four teams. Each pool was a round-robin of six games, where each team played one match against each of the other teams in the same pool. Teams were awarded three points for a win, two for a draw and one for a defeat.

The teams finishing in the top two of each pool advanced to the cup quarterfinals.

Key to colours in group tables
Teams that advance to the Cup Quarterfinal

=== Pool A ===
Team	Pld	W	D	L	PF	PA	+/−	Pts
Manawatu	3	2	1	0	62	34	+28	8
Otago	3	2	0	1	59	48	+11	7
Hawke's Bay	3	1	1	1	64	53	+11	6
Waikato	3	0	0	3	27	77	–50	3

11 January 2014
12:45

Waikato	17–20	Otago

Rotorua International Stadium, Rotorua

11 January 2014
14:25

Hawke's Bay	19–19	Manawatu

Rotorua International Stadium, Rotorua

11 January 2014
16:05

Waikato	5–33	Hawke's Bay

Rotorua International Stadium, Rotorua

11 January 2014
16:45

Manawatu	19–10	Otago

Rotorua International Stadium, Rotorua

11 January 2014
17:45

Waikato	5–24	Manawatu

Rotorua International Stadium, Rotorua

11 January 2014
19:25

Hawke's Bay	12–29	Otago

Rotorua International Stadium, Rotorua

=== Pool B ===
Team	Pld	W	D	L	PF	PA	+/−	Pts
Wellington	3	3	0	0	76	28	+48	9
Auckland	3	2	0	1	85	36	+49	7
Southland	3	1	0	2	52	81	–29	5
Poverty Bay	3	0	0	3	24	90	–66	3

11 January 2014
12:25

Wellington	28–7	Poverty Bay

Rotorua International Stadium, Rotorua

11 January 2014
14:25

Auckland	38–14	Southland

Rotorua International Stadium, Rotorua

11 January 2014
15:05

Auckland	14–17	Wellington

Rotorua International Stadium, Rotorua

11 January 2014
15:45

Poverty Bay	12–31	Southland

Rotorua International Stadium, Rotorua

11 January 2014
17:25

Auckland	33–5	Poverty Bay

Rotorua International Stadium, Rotorua

11 January 2014
18:05

Wellington	31–7	Southland

Rotorua International Stadium, Rotorua

=== Pool C ===
Team	Pld	W	D	L	PF	PA	+/−	Pts
Taranaki	3	3	0	0	65	38	+27	9
Canterbury	3	2	0	1	56	31	+25	7
North Harbour	3	1	0	2	57	70	–13	5
Mid Canterbury	3	0	0	3	40	79	–39	3

11 January 2014
13:05

North Harbour	31–19	Mid Canterbury

Rotorua International Stadium, Rotorua

11 January 2014
13:25

Taranaki	12–10	Canterbury

Rotorua International Stadium, Rotorua

11 January 2014
16:45

Taranaki	24–14	Mid Canterbury

Rotorua International Stadium, Rotorua

11 January 2014
17:05

North Harbour	12–22	Canterbury

Rotorua International Stadium, Rotorua

11 January 2014
18:45

Canterbury	24–7	Mid Canterbury

Rotorua International Stadium, Rotorua

11 January 2014
19:05

Taranaki	29–14	North Harbour

Rotorua International Stadium, Rotorua

=== Pool D ===
Team	Pld	W	D	L	PF	PA	+/−	Pts
Northland	3	2	0	1	67	51	+16	7
Bay of Plenty	3	2	0	1	48	45	+3	7
Counties Manukau	3	2	0	1	55	58	–3	7
Tasman	3	0	0	3	43	59	–16	3

11 January 2014
13:05

Northland	29–15	Counties Manukau

Rotorua International Stadium, Rotorua

11 January 2014
13:45

Bay of Plenty	14–12	Tasman

Rotorua International Stadium, Rotorua

11 January 2014
14:45

Bay of Plenty	17–12	Northland

Rotorua International Stadium, Rotorua

11 January 2014
17:05

Counties Manukau	19–12	Tasman

Rotorua International Stadium, Rotorua

11 January 2014
18:05

Bay of Plenty	17–21	Counties Manukau

Rotorua International Stadium, Rotorua

11 January 2014
18:25

Northland	26–19	Tasman

Rotorua International Stadium, Rotorua

== Knockout stage ==
=== Shield ===
Quarter-finals
12 January – Rotorua
Hawke's Bay	24
Poverty Bay	14
12 January – Rotorua
Counties Manukau	36
Mid Canterbury	5
12 January – Rotorua
North Harbour	31
Tasman	24
12 January – Rotorua
Southland	19
Waikato	17

Semi-finals
12 January – Rotorua
Poverty Bay	14
Mid Canterbury	31
12 January – Rotorua
Tasman	12
Waikato	29

Final
12 January – Rotorua
Mid Canterbury	7
Waikato	34

=== Bowl ===
Quarter-finals
12 January – Rotorua
Hawke's Bay	24
Poverty Bay	14
12 January – Rotorua
Counties Manukau	36
Mid Canterbury	5
12 January – Rotorua
North Harbour	31
Tasman	24
12 January – Rotorua
Southland	19
Waikato	17

Semi-finals
12 January – Rotorua
Hawke's Bay	17
Counties Manukau	27
12 January – Rotorua
North Harbour	24
Southland	21

Final
12 January – Rotorua
Counties Manukau	26
North Harbour	28

=== Plate ===
Quarter-finals
12 January – Rotorua
Manawatu	14
Auckland	19
12 January – Rotorua
Northland	26
Canterbury	0
12 January – Rotorua
Taranaki	17
Bay of Plenty	12
12 January – Rotorua
Wellington	24
Otago	19

Semi-finals
12 January – Rotorua
Manawatu	26
Canterbury	19
12 January – Rotorua
Bay of Plenty	21
Otago	19

Final
12 January – Rotorua
Manawatu	40
Bay of Plenty	17

=== Cup ===
Quarter-finals
12 January – Rotorua
Manawatu	14
Auckland	19
12 January – Rotorua
Northland	26
Canterbury	0
12 January – Rotorua
Taranaki	17
Bay of Plenty	12
12 January – Rotorua
Wellington	24
Otago	19

Semi-finals
12 January – Rotorua
Auckland	?
Northland	?
12 January – Rotorua
Taranaki	5
Wellington	10

Final
12 January – Rotorua
Auckland	19
Wellington	26
