= George Adkins =

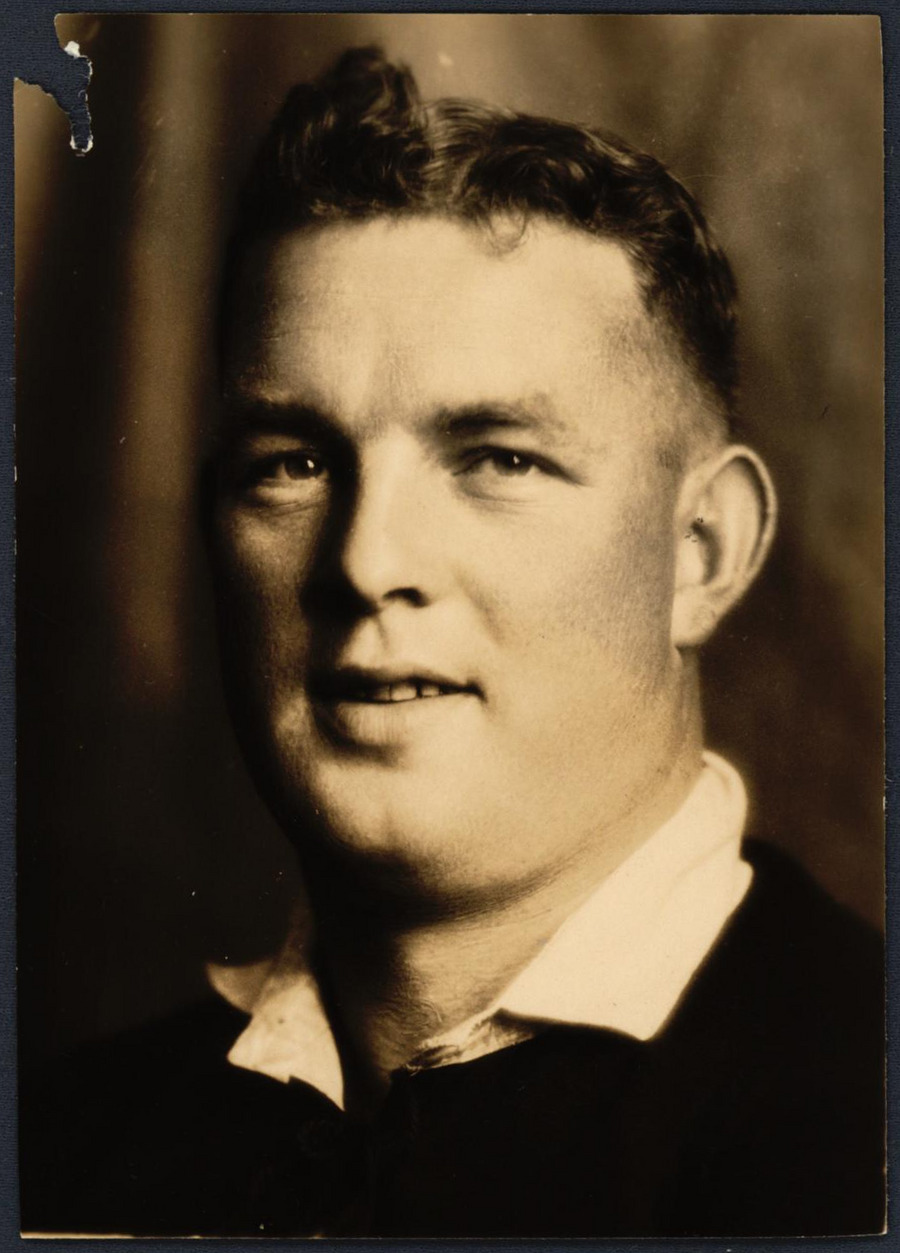
- Adkins in 1935
- Born: George Thomas Augustus Adkins; 21 August 1910 Timaru, New Zealand
- Died: 24 May 1976 (aged 65) Timaru, New Zealand
- Height: 1.80 m (5 ft 11 in)
- Weight: 93 kg (205 lb)
- Occupation(s): Draper; Civil Service; Air Force

Rugby union career
- Position: Prop
International career
Years	Team	Apps	(Points)
1935–36	New Zealand	0	(0)

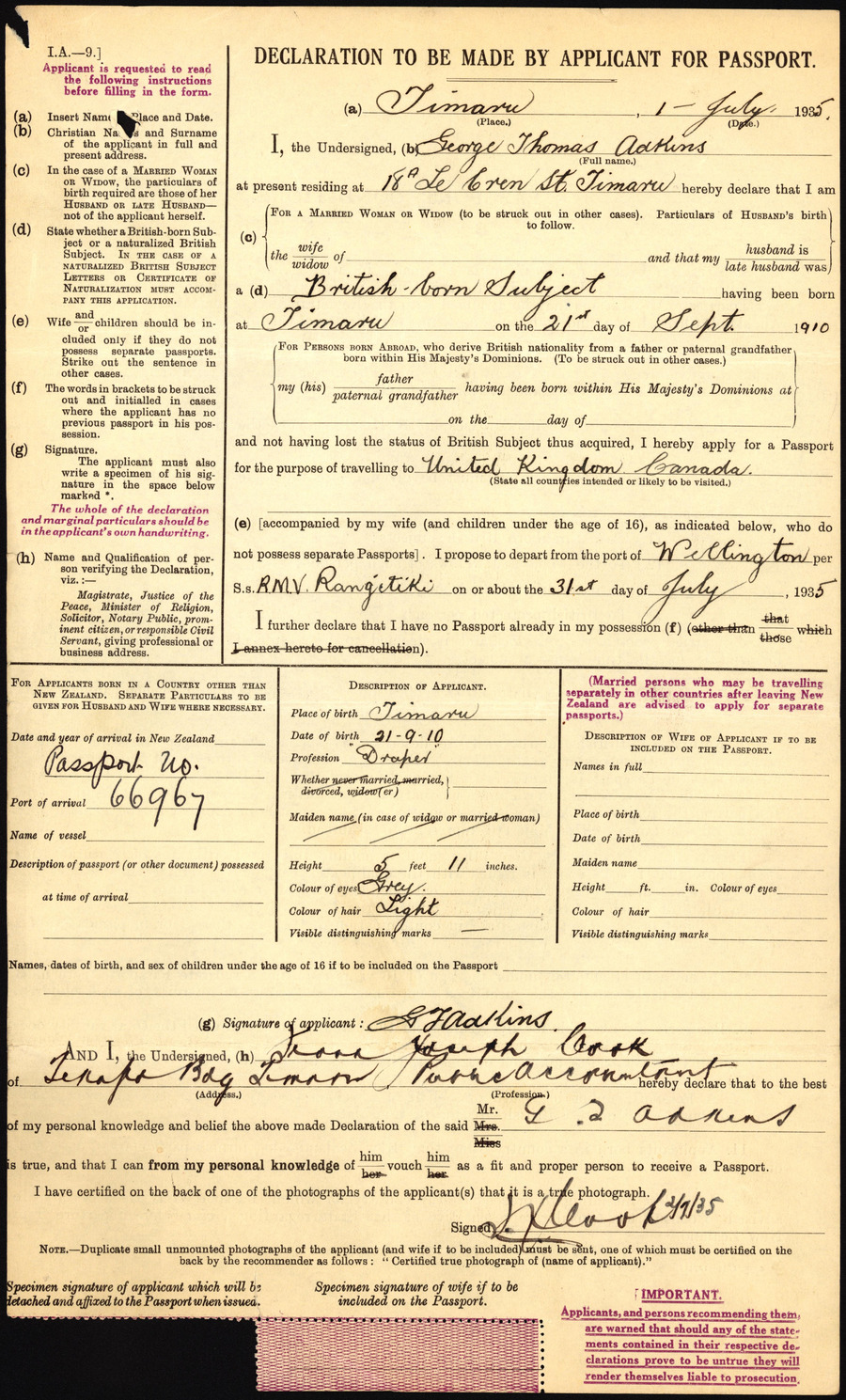
George Thomas Adkins passport application (1935)

George Thomas Augustus Adkins (21 August 1910 – 24 May 1976) was a New Zealand rugby union player. A prop, Adkins represented South Canterbury at a provincial level, and was a member of the New Zealand national side, the All Blacks, from 1935 to 1936. He never played a full test but was part of the 1935–36 New Zealand rugby union tour of Britain, Ireland and Canada playing against local sides.

A draper before serving with the RNZAF in the Pacific during World War II, Adkins was subsequently a senior civil servant with the Department of Labour.

Adkins died in Timaru on 24 May 1976.
