= Timaru Boys' High School =

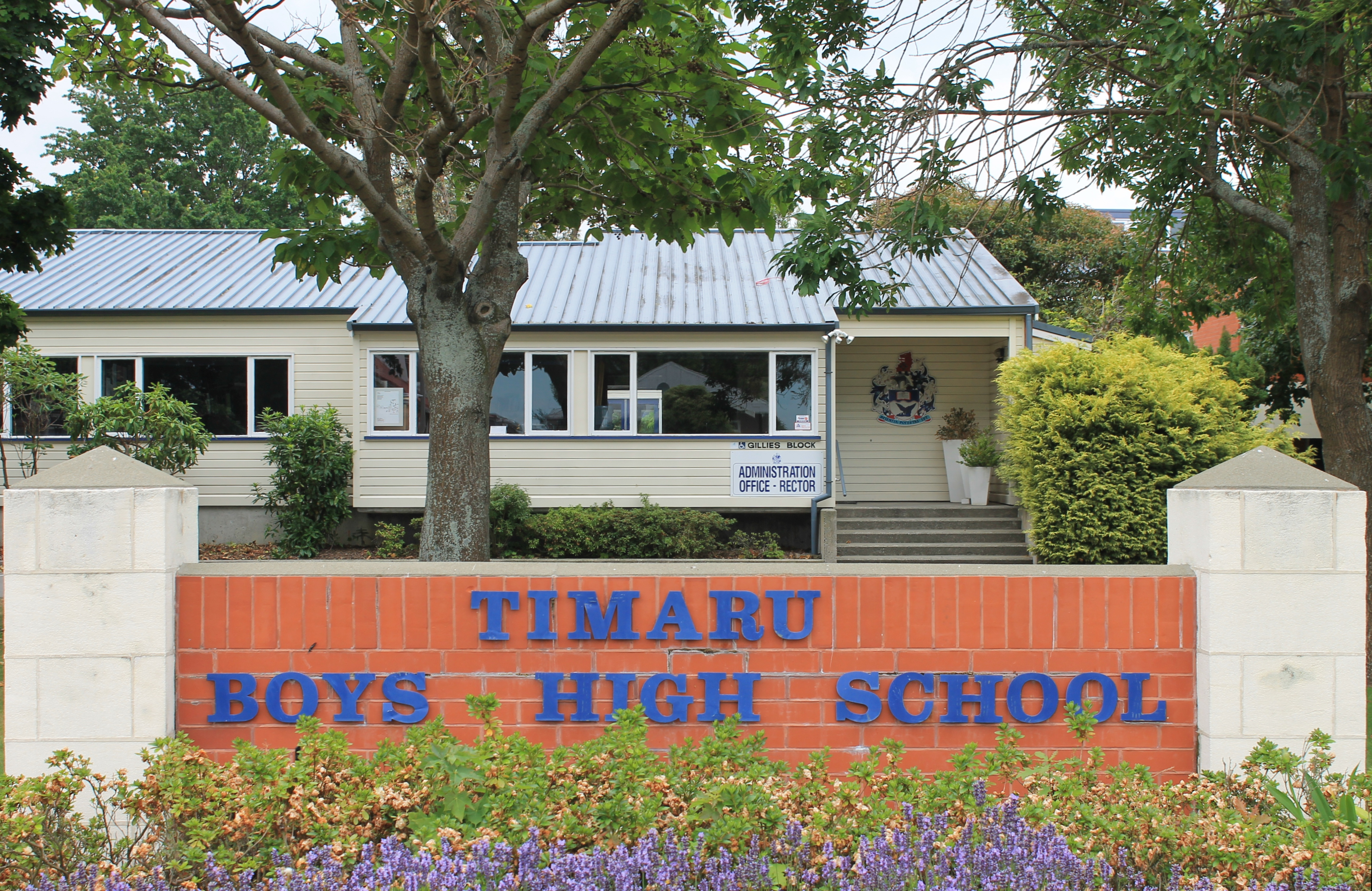
- Timaru Boys' High School entrance

Location
- 211 North Street, West End, Timaru, New Zealand; 44.3997°S 171.2302°E

Information
- Type: State boys school, years 9–13
- Motto: Latin: Scientia Postestas Est (Knowledge is power)
- Established: 1880
- Ministry of Education Institution no.: 360
- Chairperson: Brent Isbister
- Rector: David Thorp
- Gender: Male
- Enrolment: 808
- Socio-economic decile: 7O
- Website: timaruboys.school.nz

Timaru Boys' High School (also known as TBHS), established in 1880, is a single sex state (public) secondary school located in the port city of Timaru, South Canterbury, New Zealand. TBHS caters for years 9 to 13 (ages 12 to 19 years).

At the beginning of the 2026 school year, the school had more than 800 students.

== Enrolment ==
As of July 2026, Timaru Boys' High School has roll of 808 students, of which 133 (16.5%) identify as Māori.

As of 2026, the school has an Equity Index of 457, placing it amongst schools whose students have average socioeconomic barriers to achievement (roughly equivalent to deciles 5 and 6 under the former socio-economic decile system).

== Traditions ==
There are four houses, each named after a former rector and led by a house captain. Every one in the school competes in inter-house programs to earn points for their house. These include cross country, athletics, swimming sports, singing, volleyball, basketball and quadball tournaments. The houses compete annually for the Cleland Cup.

Timaru Boys' house names and their colours
Dawson	Named after L Halket-Dawson, rector 1880–1887
Hogben	Named after George Hogben, rector 1888–1898
Simmers	Named after George A Simmers, rector 1899–1912
Tait	Named after Alan G Tait, rector 1935–1947

== Sport ==
TBHS plays in 5 traditional interschool fixtures:

- Christchurch Boys' High School
- St Andrew's College, Christchurch
- Otago Boys' High School
- Waitaki Boys' High School. This is the longest running non-stop inter-school fixture in New Zealand.
- John McGlashan College. This fixture begun in 2018.

=== Rugby ===
The Timaru Boys' High School 1st XV competes in the Miles Toyota 1st XV Boys' Premiership and the South Island Boys' Schools Rugby Competition.

The 1st XV made it into the finals of the UC Cup for the first time in the 2017 season.

== Thomas House boarding hostel ==
The Thomas House boarding hostel is attached to and is an integral part of the school. Built in 1907, Thomas House, named after the school's first rector, welcomed in its first eight boarders in 1908. In 2010 it held just over 80 boarders; by 2017, Thomas House reached capacity with 119 boarders. Thomas House has several wings. The Fraser Wing from 1962 is named after Hanson Fraser, who chaired the board of governors for two decades. The Jubilee Wing from 1984 commemorates the 75th jubilee of the boarding hostel. The Manning Wing commemorates several members of the Manning family who worked at the boarding hostel. The Lindsay Wing commemorates two cousins of the same name who both represented New Zealand internationally in 1928: David Lindsay went to the Olympics as a swimmer and Dave Lindsay was a member of the 1928 New Zealand rugby union tour of South Africa. In March 2019, Lewis Wing was opened which was named after Old Boy Peter Lewis.

== Notable alumni ==
=== Academia ===
- Harold Williams (1876–1928), linguist
- John Hattie (b. 1950), education academic

=== The arts ===
- Michael Houstoun (b 1952), concert pianist
- Kevin Smith (1963–2002), actor
- Jeff Wassmann (b 1958), artist
- Mika Haka (b 1962), performance artist

=== Business ===
- Sir Roy McKenzie (1922–2007), businessman & philanthropist

=== Medicine ===
- Sir John Staveley (1914-2006), haematologist, pathologist, and a pioneer in the field of blood transfusion services

=== Public service ===
- Thomas Burnett (1877–1941), MP for Temuka (1919–1941)
- Frank Kitts (1912–1979), Wellington mayor and MP
- Sir Ivor Richardson (1930–2014), Privy Councillor and jurist
- Jim Sutton (b 1941), MP for Waitaki, Timaru, Aoraki, and List MP, and cabinet minister
- James Meager (b 1986 or 1987), MP for Rangitata (2023–present)

=== Sport ===
- Jack Lovelock (1910–1949), athlete, 1936 Olympic 1500m champion
- George T. A. Adkins (1910–1976), All Black (uncapped) 1935–1936
- Dick Tayler (b 1948), athlete, 1974 Commonwealth Games 10,000m Champion
- Craig Cumming (b 1975), New Zealand cricket player 2003–2007
- Brendan Laney (b 1973), Scotland rugby player 2001–2004
- Isaac Ross (b 1984), All Black 2009
- Archie Strang (1908–1969), All Black 1928–1931
- Hayden Paddon (b 1987), motorsport, World Rally Championship driver, 2007–present
- Marc Ryan (b 1982), cycling, bronze medallist at 2008 Olympics and 2012 Olympics
- Hamish Bennett (b 1987), New Zealand cricket player 2010–present
- Aki Seiuli (b 1992), professional rugby player 2012–present
- Tomas Walsh (b 1992), athlete, shot put bronze medallist at 2016 Olympics
- Lachie Grant (1908–1969), All Black 1947–1951
- Cullen Grace (b 1999), All Black 2020–present
