= 1949 New Zealand rugby union tour of South Africa =

Tour of South Africa

Summary
P	W	D	L
Total
25	15	4	6
Test match
4	0	0	4
Opponent
P	W	D	L
South Africa
4	0	0	4

1949 saw the second full tour of South Africa by a representative New Zealand rugby union team (the New Zealand national rugby union team). The All Blacks achieved a record of 13 wins, 7 losses and 4 draws, and they lost the test series 4–0.

== Non-selection of Māori players ==
As they had in 1928 and would do again in 1960, the New Zealand union left Māori players out of the 30-man tour squad to meet apartheid conditions set by South Africa. Particularly notable omissions were "Johnny Smith, Ben Couch and Vincent Bevan... All three (and Ron Bryers) would surely have otherwise gone to South Africa." Smith's official All Black profile now acknowledges "the unforgivable weakness shown by New Zealand rugby".

Kiwi Blake (who was of African American heritage but played for the Māori All Blacks) is quoted as saying that after a trial match he, Bevan and Smith were told by a selector that "If you had been eligible, you would have all gone". Researcher and historian Malcolm Mulholland wrote the All Blacks captain Fred Allen "later mourned the loss of Smith and, in particular, Bevan...as one of the main reasons for the All Blacks' four-nil series drubbing". The squad that did go refused to perform the traditional haka before any match on the tour in protest with Jim Parker citing: "The war cry is a creation of the Māoris and as we have no Māoris with us we are not giving the war cry."

In 2010 the rugby unions of New Zealand and South Africa, and the South African government, apologised for this selection policy which was implemented at the South Africans' request by the NZRFU, which at the time had said that it "did not want to subject them [i.e. Māori] to possible reprisals".

As this tour took place, a simultaneous Australia tour to New Zealand led to the unusual situation of two All Black tests on 3 September 1949, in Durban and Wellington. The All Blacks lost both. One reason for New Zealand affording the Australian series test status was to allow Māori players excluded from South Africa to earn caps.

== Matches ==
Scores and results list New Zealand's points tally first.

Opposing Team	For	Against	Date	Venue	Status
Western Province Universities	11	9	31 May 1949	Newlands, Cape Town	Tour Match
Boland	8	5	4 June 1949	Boland Stadium, Wellington	Tour Match
South Western Districts	21	3	8 June 1949	Oudtshoorn Ground, Oudtshoorn	Tour Match
Eastern Province	6	3	11 June 1949	Crusader Ground, Port Elizabeth	Tour Match
Border	0	9	15 June 1949	Recreation Ground, East London	Tour Match
Natal	8	0	18 June 1949	Kingsmead, Durban	Tour Match
Western Transvaal	19	3	22 June 1949	Olën Park, Potchefstroom	Tour Match
A Transvaal XV	6	3	25 June 1949	Ellis Park, Johannesburg	Tour Match
Orange Free State	9	9	29 June 1949	Kroonstad Ground, Kroonstad	Tour Match
Eastern Transvaal	5	6	2 July 1949	PAM Brink Stadium, Springs	Tour Match
Western Province	6	3	9 July 1949	Newlands, Cape Town	Tour Match
South Africa	11	15	16 July 1949	Newlands, Cape Town	First Test
Transvaal	13	3	23 July 1949	Ellis Park, Johannesburg	Tour Match
Rhodesia	8	10	27 July 1949	Hartsfield, Bulawayo	Tour Match
Rhodesia	3	3	30 July 1949	Old Hararians' Ground, Salisbury	Tour Match
Northern Transvaal	6	3	6 August 1949	Loftus Versfeld, Pretoria	Tour Match
South Africa	6	12	13 August 1949	Ellis Park, Johannesburg	Second Test
Northern Universities	17	3	17 August 1949	Loftus Versfeld, Pretoria	Tour Match
Griqualand West	8	6	20 August 1949	De Beer's Stadium, Kimberley	Tour Match
North-Eastern Districts	28	3	24 August 1949	Aliwal North Ground, Aliwal North	Tour Match
Orange Free State	14	9	27 August 1949	Springbok Park, Bloemfontein	Tour Match
South Africa	3	9	3 September 1949	Kingsmead, Durban	Third Test
Border	6	6	10 September 1949	Recreation Ground, East London	Tour Match
South Africa	8	11	17 September 1949	Crusader Ground, Port Elizabeth	Fourth Test
Cape Town Clubs	11	11	21 September 1949	Newlands, Cape Town	Tour Match
