= History of rugby union matches between Munster and New Zealand =

Munster Rugby has a strong tradition of competitiveness against touring rugby teams. They have played the All Blacks, the national team of New Zealand, 8 times since 1905. In 1978, they became the first Irish team, including the Irish national team, to win a match in the history of competition between the countries, and remained the only Irish team to beat the All Blacks until the Irish national team defeated New Zealand in November 2016.

== History of matches between Munster and New Zealand ==
=== 1905 ===
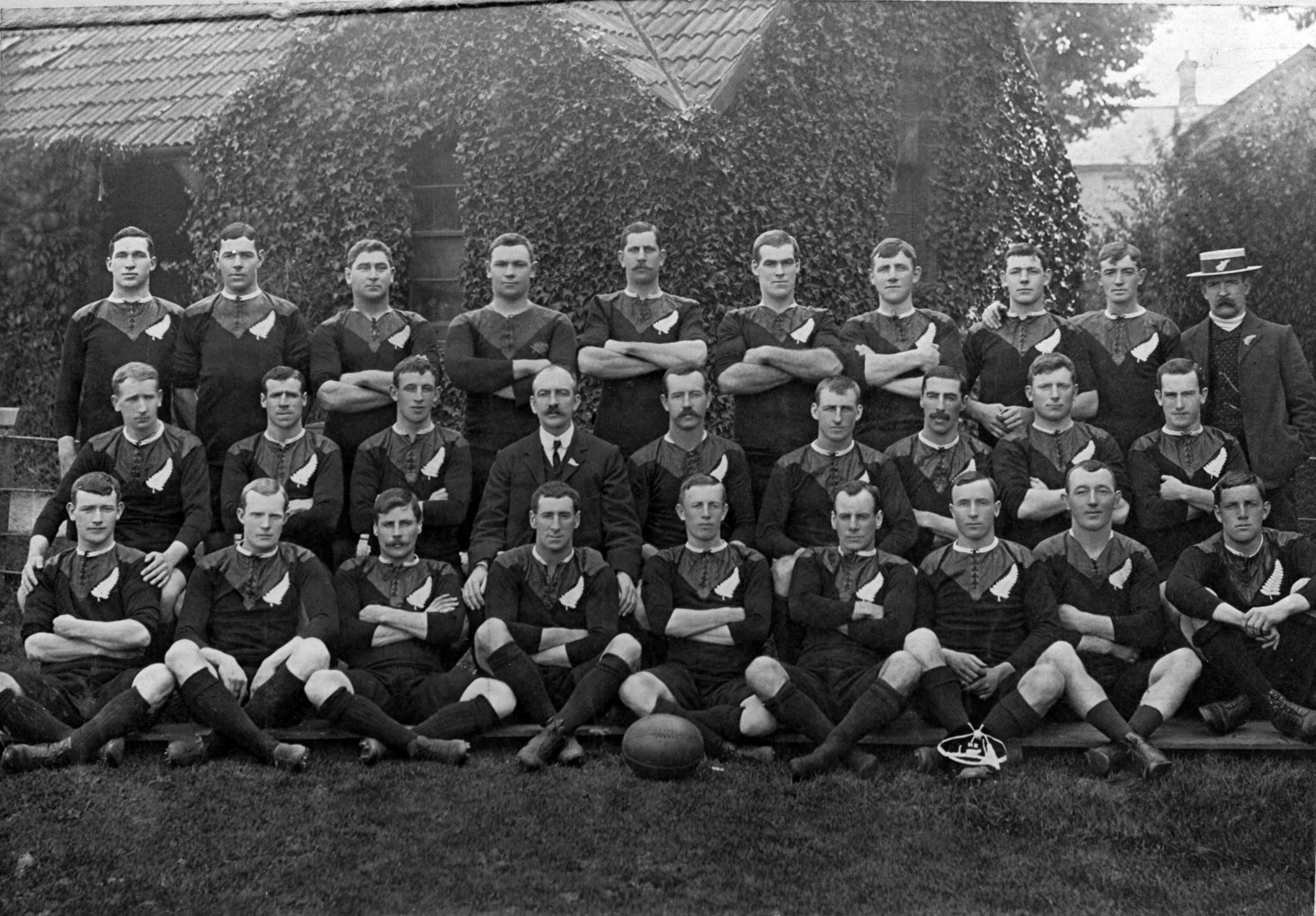
The 1905 Original All Blacks.

The 1905 Original All Blacks were the first New Zealand national rugby union team to tour outside Australasia. Captained by Irish born Dave Gallaher, they toured the British Isles, France, Ireland and the United States during 1905–06 and became known as "The Originals". Their match with Munster was played at Markets Field in Limerick on Tuesday 28 November and the touring side defeated Munster 33–0. The eight tries witnessed by the 3,000 strong crowd included a penalty try after Fred Roberts was tripped close to the line. Munster were captained by Basil Maclear.

Munster A. Quillinan, A. Newton, B. McLear, W.O Stokes, R.M McGrath, F. McQueen, J. O'Connor, J. Wallace, T.S Reeves, S.K Hosford, M. White, R. Welply, T. Acheson, T. Churchwarden.
New ZealandErnie Booth, Harold Abbott, George Smith, Billy Stead (Capt), Duncan McGregor, Simon Mynott, Fred Roberts, George Gillet, Frank Glasgow, John Corbett, George Nicholson, Bill Cunningham, Alex McDonald, Fred Newton, William Mackrell

=== 1954 ===
Between 1953 and 1954, New Zealand toured Britain, Ireland, France and North America. They played Munster at the Mardyke in Cork, winning 6 - 3 on 13 January 1954 in front of a crowd of 7000 in cold and snowy conditions.

Munster B. G. M. Wood, D. Crowley, J. T. Clifford, J. S. McCarthy, T. E. Reid, M. Madden, B. Cussen, G. Reidy, J. A. O'Meara, D. Daly, N. Coleman, R. Godfrey, G. Kenny, B. Mullen, P. Berkery
New Zealand Arthur Woods, Ian Clarke, Jack Kelly, Kevin Skinner, Des Oliver, Nelson Dalzell, Keith Bagley, Peter Jones, Bob Stuart, Vincent Bevan, Laurie Haig, Doug Wilson, Jim Fitzgerald, John Tanner, Stu Freebairn

=== 1963 ===
In 1963, the All Blacks toured Britain, Ireland, France and Canada. On 11 December that year, they beat Munster again by 6 - 3. The game was played at Thomond Park in Limerick in wet and windy conditions. New Zealand were captained by Ian Clarke.

Munster Tom Kiernan, M. Lucey, Jerry Walsh, B. O'Brien, P. McGrath, M. English, N. Kavanagh, M. O'Callaghan, P. Lane, M. Carey, J. Murray, M. Spillane, D. Kiely, H. Wall, Noel Murphy.
New Zealand Mack Herewini, Ian Smith, Bill Davis, Ian MacRae, Bruce Watt, Earle Kirton, Chris Laidlaw, Brian Lochore, Kel Tremain, Allan Stewart, Ron Horsley, Kevin Barry, Ian Clarke, John Major, Jules Le Lievre

=== 1973 ===
In 1972 and 1973 New Zealand toured Britain, Ireland, France and North America. Munster drew 3-3 with them in Musgrave Park in Cork, on 16 January with the All Blacks only securing the draw with a penalty in the last minute of the game. New Zealand were captained by Alex Wyllie.

Munster Tom Kiernan, J. Barry, Seamus Dennison, Barry Bresnihan, Patrick Parfrey, Barry McGann, Donal Canniffe, Phil O'Callaghan, J. Leahy, K. Keyes, John Madigan Snr, Moss Keane, Colm Tucker, T. Moore, Shay Deering.
New Zealand Trevor Morris, Bryan Williams, George Skudder, Duncan Hales, Mike Parkinson, Ian Stevens, Lin Colling, Alan Sutherland, Alex Wyllie, Andy Haden, Ian Eliason, Bevan Holmes, Kent Lambert, Ron Urlich, Sandy McNicol

=== 1974 ===
In 1974 Munster played New Zealand in their tour of the Ireland, Wales and England with New Zealand winning 14 - 4 at Thomond Park, on 9 November in front of a crowd of 10800. New Zealand were captained by Andy Leslie.
Munster Dick Spring, Patrick Parfrey, Larry Moloney, J. Coleman, Pat Lavery, Barry McGann, Donal Canniffe, O. Waldron, Pat Whelan, P. O'Callaghan, John Madigan Snr, Moss Keane, Colm Tucker, T. Moore, Shay Deering.
New Zealand Joe Karam, Bryan Williams, Grant Batty, Bruce Robertson, Joe Morgan, Duncan Robertson, Sid Going, Andy Leslie, Ken Stewart, Hamish Macdonald, Peter Whiting, Ian Kirkpatrick, Ash Gardiner, Tane Norton, Kerry Tanner

=== 1978 ===
In 1978, New Zealand toured the northern hemisphere. In a highly successful tour the All Blacks won every match they played, bar one: the fixture against Munster.

Munster became the first Irish team to beat the All Blacks. The 12–0 victory took place on Tuesday 31 October 1978 at Thomond Park, in front of a crowd of 12,000. Munster were coached by former Ireland and British and Irish Lions captain Tom Kiernan. Kiernan, who had played in the 1963 and 1973 games against the All Blacks targeted the match. He ensured that Munster were physically fit and as part of his preparation, Munster undertook a two-match tour to London playing Middlesex and the Exiles, a team mainly made up of London Irish players.

Although Munster were not expected to win, Christy Cantillon scored a try with Tony Ward converting. Ward also adding a drop goal in each half. New Zealand were held scoreless with New Zealand wing Stu Wilson remarking afterwards that "We were lucky to get nil". Wilson likened the match to playing on front of a crowd of 100,000, such was the noise. Graham Mourie was the captain of the New Zealand team and Donal Canniffe captained Munster.

Munster Gerry McLoughlin, Pat Whelan, Les White, Moss Keane, Brendan Foley, Christy Cantillon, Colm Tucker, Donal Spring, Donal Canniffe, Tony Ward, Jimmy Bowen, Greg Barrett, Seamus Dennison, Moss Finn, Larry Moloney
New Zealand Brad Johnstone, John Black, Gary Knight, Frank Oliver, Andy Haden, Wayne Graham, Graham Mourie, Ash McGregor, Mark Donaldson, Eddie Dunn, Bryan Williams, Lyn Jaffray, Bruce Robertson, Stu Wilson, Brian McKechnie

=== 1989 ===
Munster played New Zealand who were reigning Rugby World Cup champions, having won the inaugural competition in 1987, in their 1989 tour at Musgrave Park, Cork, on 11 November 1989, losing 9 - 31. The match had an attendance of 18,000 with Buck Shelford captaining the visitors.
Munster P. M. Clohessy, T. J. Kingston, J. J. Fitzgerald, M. J. Galwey, D. G. Lenihan, K. O'Connell, P. T. J. O'Hara, P. C. Collins, M. T. Bradley, R. P. Keyes, P. V. Murray, C. Murphy, M. J. Kiernan, J. Galvin, K. J. Murphy.
New Zealand Ron Williams, Sean Fitzpatrick, Richard Loe, Zinzan Brooke, Murray Pierce, Steve Gordon, Wayne Shelford, Graeme Bachop, Grant Fox, John Schuster, Joe Stanley, Terry Wright, Craig Innes, John Gallagher.

=== 2008 ===
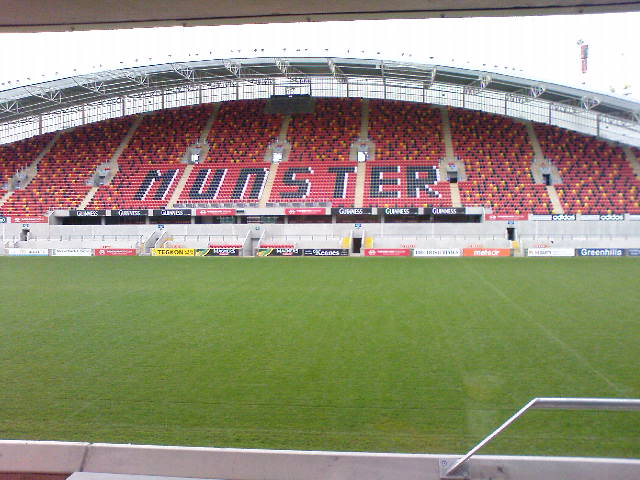
Thomond Park in November 2008

The All Blacks returned to Thomond Park on 18 November 2008, to commemorate the 30th anniversary of the 1978 game and to celebrate the opening of the new stadium. Four of the 1978 team, Graham Mourie, Bryan Williams, Mark Donaldson and Gary Knight were in the crowd for the occasion. Prior to kick off, Munster's four New Zealand players, Rua Tipoki, Doug Howlett, Lifeimi Mafi and Jeremy Manning, challenged the All Blacks by performing the Haka first. Munster were without 10 of their squad who were on international duty and New Zealand chose to play an understrength team, resting key players for the forthcoming match against Ireland a few days later.

Munster almost repeated history, leading 16-10 at half time and after 76 minutes of the match were winning 16-13. The Munster try, scored by Barry Murphy in the first half, was the only one scored against New Zealand during their European leg of the 2008 end of year rugby tests. A late try by Joe Rokocoko secured a win for the All Blacks with a final score 18-16.

Media reporting towards the match was extremely positive, commending the atmosphere, and the physical intensity of the Munster players. New Zealand coach Graham Henry said that the experience would help the development of many of the All Blacks who were young and inexperienced and might not have felt the sort of heat Munster and their crowd were able to generate.

Munster F. Pucciariello, F. Sheahan, T. Ryan, M. O'Driscoll, D. Ryan, J. Coughlan, N. Ronan, D. Leamy, P. A. Stringer, P. Warwick, I. Dowling, L. Mafi, R. Tipoki, B. Murphy, D. Howlett
Subs: D. Fogarty, T. Buckley, M. Melbourne, B. Holland, J. O'Sullivan, M. Prendergast, J. Manning
New Zealand Jamie Mackintosh, Corey Flynn, Ben Franks, Adam Thomson, Ross Filipo, Jason Eaton, Scott Waldrom, Liam Messam, Piri Weepu, Isaia Toeava, Anthony Tuitavake, Joe Rokocoko, Hosea Gear, Cory Jane. Stephen Donald.

=== 2016: Māori All Blacks ===
Munster hosted the Māori All Blacks in a capped friendly in Thomond Park on 11 November 2016. Before kick-off, the Māori All Blacks captain, Ash Dixon, led a tribute to Munster's late head coach Anthony Foley by placing an All Blacks jersey with Foley's initials on the halfway line, before performing the haka and presenting the jersey to Foley's two sons.

In heavy rain, Munster began the match well, with Niall Scannell scoring the provinces first try in the 13th minute. However, the Māori All Blacks hit back with two tries in the space of two minutes, firstly from James Lowe in the 23rd minute and then from Ambrose Curtis in the 25th, with Otere Black converting both to give the Māori a 14–5 lead. Munster were awarded a penalty try in the 30th minute after Rory Scannell was tackled without the ball on the Māori try line, for which Reed Prinsep was sin-binned. Ian Keatley converted the try. 7 minutes later, Darren Sweetnam hacked the ball out of his own half and, displaying excellent ball control, kicked the ball into the Māori in-goal area to score a try. A failed conversion gave Munster a 17–14 half-time lead.

The home side scored first in the second-half, with Ian Keatley kicking a 43rd-minute penalty to extend Munster's lead. Despite Duncan Williams being shown a yellow card for a high tackle in the 45th minute, the Munster defence remained resolute and they maintained their assault on Māori territory, having a try ruled out by the TMO, before Ronan O'Mahony scored a try in the 67th minute, converted by Keatley, to give Munster a 27–14 lead heading into the final 10 minutes of the game, a lead they never relinquished, despite the Māori All Blacks fighting until the final whistle. Many of the crowd stayed after the end of the game, as both teams completed laps of honour after the memorable meeting of the two sides.

New Zealanders Rhys Marshall and Te Aihe Toma were in the Munster team, whilst John Foley and Seán O'Connor made their Munster debuts as replacements during the game. O'Connor had tasted victory against a New Zealand team before, having been part of the Ireland Under-20s team that beat New Zealand Under-20s at the 2016 World Rugby Under 20 Championship. Tommy O'Donnell captained Munster for the first time, and Robin Copeland won the Man-of-the-Match award.

11 November 2016
19:30

| Munster | 27–14 | (New Zealand) Māori All Blacks |
| Try: N. Scannell 13' m Penalty try 30' c Sweetnam 37' m R. O'Mahony 67' c Con: Keatley (2/4) 30', 69'; Pen: Keatley (1/1) 43' | Report | Try: Lowe 23' c Curtis 25' c Con: Black (2/2) 24', 27' |

Thomond Park
Attendance: 25,600
Referee: Craig Maxwell-Keys (RFU)

Team details

| FB | 15 | (Ireland) Andrew Conway |
| RW | 14 | (Ireland) Darren Sweetnam |
| OC | 13 | (South Africa) Jaco Taute | | (substituted off) 76' |
| IC | 12 | (Ireland) Rory Scannell |
| LW | 11 | (Ireland) Ronan O'Mahony | | (substituted off) 75' |
| FH | 10 | (Ireland) Ian Keatley |
| SH | 9 | (Ireland) Duncan Williams | (yellow card) 45' to 55' |
| N8 | 8 | (Ireland) Robin Copeland |
| OF | 7 | (Ireland) Conor Oliver |
| BF | 6 | (Ireland) Tommy O'Donnell (c) |
| RL | 5 | (Ireland) Darren O'Shea |
| LL | 4 | (Ireland) John Madigan | | (substituted off) 54' | (substituted on) 60' | (substituted off) 76' |
| TP | 3 | (Ireland) Stephen Archer | | (substituted off) 71' |
| HK | 2 | (Ireland) Niall Scannell | | (substituted off) 61' |
| LP | 1 | (Ireland) James Cronin | | (substituted off) 25' |
Replacements:
| HK | 16 | (New Zealand) Rhys Marshall | | (substituted on) 61' |
| PR | 17 | (Ireland) Peter McCabe | | (substituted on) 25' |
| PR | 18 | (Ireland) Brian Scott | | (substituted on) 71' |
| LK | 19 | (Ireland) Seán O'Connor | | (substituted on) 54' | (substituted off) 60' |
| FL | 20 | (Ireland) John Foley | | | | (substituted on) 76' |
| SH | 21 | (New Zealand) Te Aihe Toma |
| CE | 22 | (Ireland) Dan Goggin | | (substituted on) 76' |
| WG | 23 | (Ireland) Alex Wootton | | (substituted on) 75' |
Coach:
(South Africa) Rassie Erasmus

| FB | 15 | Marty McKenzie | | (substituted off) 61' |
| RW | 14 | Ambrose Curtis |
| OC | 13 | Matt Proctor |
| IC | 12 | Tim Bateman |
| LW | 11 | James Lowe |
| FH | 10 | Otere Black |
| SH | 9 | Billy Guyton | | (substituted off) 55' |
| N8 | 8 | Akira Ioane |
| OF | 7 | Shane Christie | | (substituted off) 71' |
| BF | 6 | Reed Prinsep | (yellow card) 31' to 41' |
| RL | 5 | Tom Franklin |
| LL | 4 | Leighton Price |
| TP | 3 | Ben May |
| HK | 2 | Ash Dixon (c) |
| LP | 1 | Kane Hames |
Replacements:
| HK | 16 | Leni Apisai |
| PR | 17 | Chris Eves |
| PR | 18 | Marcel Renata |
| LK | 19 | Whetu Douglas |
| FL | 20 | Kara Pryor | | (substituted on) 71' |
| SH | 21 | Brad Weber | | (substituted on) 55' |
| FH | 22 | Ihaia West |
| CE | 23 | Jason Emery | | (substituted on) 61' |
Coach:
(New Zealand) Colin Cooper

Man of the Match:
(Ireland) Robin Copeland (Munster)

Touch judges:
Frank Murphy (Ireland)
Leo Colgan (Ireland)
Television match official:
Brian MacNiece (Ireland)

== Book, Play and Documentary on the 1978 game ==
A stage play named Alone it Stands by John Breen and a book named Stand Up and Fight: When Munster Beat the All Blacks by Alan English were both based on the events. Both have been commercially successful. Alone it Stands has had several sell-out runs in Ireland and has played in the Sydney Opera House and in Auckland. "Stand Up and Fight" was a bestseller in 2005.

Setanta Sports also produced a documentary called Alone It Stands: the documentary with excerpts from the play intercut with the first hand testimonies of the 1978 players.

Before the 2008 match, the All Blacks attended a production of the play to understand what the game meant to Munster supporters.

== Munster players from New Zealand ==
A number of players from New Zealand have been involved with Munster over the years:

- Tyler Bleyendaal, who had captained New Zealand Under-20 and played for Canterbury and the Crusaders.
- Christian Cullen, former Hurricanes and All Blacks fullback.
- Rhys Ellison, Bay of Plenty, Otago and Waikato representative who won over 20 caps for the Māori All Blacks.
- Jason Holland, who qualified for Ireland and represented Ireland A.
- Doug Howlett, New Zealand's current all-time highest try scorer.
- Casey Laulala, capped twice by the All Blacks.
- Quentin MacDonald, who played for New Zealand Under-20 and Sevens.
- Lifeimi Mafi, who played for Hurricanes, Manawatu, Taranaki and New Zealand Sevens.
- Jeremy Manning, born in Blenheim, New Zealand, though later qualified for Ireland.
- Rhys Marshall, who played as hooker for Taranaki, the Chiefs, North Harbour, Waikato, the Highlanders and the New Zealand Under-20.
- Alby Mathewson, capped five times by the All Blacks, including against Munster in 2008.
- Toby Morland, who played for Otago, Highlanders, Chiefs, Blues, Auckland and Manawatu.
- Francis Saili, capped twice by the All Blacks.
- Rua Tipoki, a former Māori All Blacks captain.
- Savenaca Tokula, who played for New Zealand Sevens.
- Te Aihe Toma, who played for Bay of Plenty and Highlanders.
- Sam Tuitupou, capped nine times by the All Blacks.
- Nick Williams, who played for North Harbour, Blues and the Junior All Blacks
