= Ranfurly Shield 1940–1949 =

The Ranfurly Shield, colloquially known as the Log o' Wood, is perhaps the most prestigious trophy in New Zealand's domestic rugby union competition. First played for in 1904, the Ranfurly Shield is based on a challenge system, rather than a league or knockout competition as with most football trophies. The holding union must defend the Shield in challenge matches, and if a challenger defeats them, they become the new holder of the Shield.

== Holders ==
Two different unions held the Ranfurly Shield between 1940 and 1949. Due to the outbreak of World War 2, however, no matches were played between 1940 and 1945.

Union	Won	Successful defences
Southland	Held at beginning of decade	5
Otago	2 August 1947	17

== Fixtures ==
=== 1946 ===
3 August 1946

Southland	3–0	Otago
Pen: Tom Webster

Rugby Park Stadium, Invercargill
Referee: E.J. Barron (Southland)

24 August 1946

Southland	11–3	Canterbury
Try: E.D. Calder; Con: Tom Webster; Pen: Tom Webster (2)		Try: W.P. McHugh

Rugby Park Stadium, Invercargill
Referee: E.J. Barron (Southland)

31 August 1946

Southland	35–9	South Canterbury
Try: A.S. Chandler (4), Alexander Sutherland (2), R.H. Hazlett, N.J. Bennett, R.F. Waldron; Con: Tom Webster (2); Drop: R.F. Waldron		Try: P.G. Fitzgerald; Con: R.G. Prattley; Drop: G.W. Pratt

Rugby Park Stadium, Invercargill
Attendance: 7,000
Referee: R. Ferguson (Southland)

7 September 1946

Southland	12–3	Wairarapa
Try: R.H. Hazlett; Pen: Tom Webster (2), R.J. Campbell		Pen: M.P. Hurley

Rugby Park Stadium, Invercargill
Referee: E.J. Barron (Southland)

28 September 1946

Southland	15–3	North Otago
Try: Alexander Sutherland (2), J.J. Prendiville, R.H. Hazlett; Pen: Tom Webster		Pen: E.V. Wright

Rugby Park Stadium, Invercargill
Referee: J.J. North (Southland)

=== 1947 ===
2 August 1947

Southland	11–17	Otago
Try: G.S. Kennedy, G.H. Spittle; Con: L.F. Ward; Pen: L.F. Ward		Try: Ron Elvidge (2), Ian Botting, John Tanner; Con: Rex Orr; Pen: Rex Orr

Rugby Park Stadium, Invercargill
Attendance: 21,000
Referee: R. Ferguson (Southland)

9 August 1947

Otago	31–12	North Auckland
Try: John Tanner, L.S. Woodhouse, Graham Moore, Jim Kearney; Con: Rex Orr (3); Pen: Rex Orr (3); Drop: Jim Kearney		Try: Doc Paewai; Pen: Nau Cherrington (3)

Carisbrook, Dunedin
Attendance: 25,000
Referee: J.J. North (Southland)

20 August 1947

Otago	18–12	Auckland
Try: John Tanner, Ron Elvidge; Con: Laurie Haig; Pen: Laurie Haig (2); Drop: Jim Kearney		Try: Les Deas (2); Con: Bob Scott; Drop: D.J. Ewert

Carisbrook, Dunedin
Referee: Leslie Walsh (Canterbury)

13 September 1947

Otago	8–0	Southland
Try: Kevin O'Connor; Con: Jim Kearney; Pen: Jim Kearney

Carisbrook, Dunedin
Referee: J.G.G. Fitzpatrick (Wellington)

27 September 1947

Otago	42–3	North Otago
Try: Ron Elvidge (2), Kevin O'Connor (2), John Tanner, Ian Botting, Graham Moore, D.H. Hamilton, Jim Kearney, Jack McNab, L.S. Woodhouse; Con: Rex Orr; Pen: Rex Orr; Drop: Jim Kearney		Try: M.D. Fountain

Carisbrook, Dunedin
Attendance: 12,300
Referee: L.K. Murray (South Canterbury)

=== 1948 ===
31 July 1948

Otago	25–0	Southland
Try: Bill Meates (3), Ian Botting (2), Ray Dalton, Ron Elvidge; Con: Laurie Haig, Graham Moore

Carisbrook, Dunedin
Attendance: 30,000
Referee: Arthur Fong (West Coast)

18 August 1948

Otago	31–0	Canterbury
Try: Jim Kearney (2), Bill Meates, L.S. Woodhouse, Ian Botting; Laurie Haig, Ron Elvidge; Con: Jim Kearney, Laurie Haig; Pen: Laurie Haig (2)

Carisbrook, Dunedin
Referee: R. Ferguson (Southland)

21 August 1948

Otago	20–3	Wanganui
Try: Bill Meates (3), L.S. Woodhouse, Laurie Haig; Con: Laurie Haig; Drop: Jim Kearney		Try: Don Beard

Carisbrook, Dunedin
Referee: L.K. Murray (South Canterbury)

28 August 1948

Otago	12–6	Hawke's Bay
Try: Ian Botting; Pen: Laurie Haig (2), Graham Moore		Pen: Barney Wishnowsky (2)

Carisbrook, Dunedin
Referee: Bill Firmin (Wellington)

4 September 1948

Otago	40–0	Poverty Bay
Try: Jim Kearney (3), Kevin O'Connor (2), Ian Botting (2), Bill Meates, Laurie Haig; L.S. Woodhouse, Ron Elvidge; Con: Laurie Haig (2); Pen: Graham Moore

Carisbrook, Dunedin
Attendance: 9,000
Referee: Robert Pratt (Buller)

8 September 1948

Otago	36–6	South Canterbury
Try: Bill Meates (5), Laurie Haig, Ron Elvidge, Jim Kearney; Con: Laurie Haig (3); Pen: Laurie Haig (2)		Try: J.L. Taylor; Pen: R.G. Prattley

Carisbrook, Dunedin
Referee: J.G.G. Fitzpatrick (Wellington)

25 September 1948

Otago	11–0	Wellington
Try: Ian Botting, Peter Johnstone; Con: Laurie Haig; Drop: Jim Kearney

Carisbrook, Dunedin
Referee: George Sullivan (Taranaki)

=== 1949 ===
30 July 1949

Otago	6–6	Buller
Try: N.M. McKenzie; Pen: Graham Moore		Try: R.P. Hawes, W.M. Cunniffe

Carisbrook, Dunedin
Referee: Leslie Walsh (Canterbury)

6 August 1949

Otago	22–3	Manawatu
Try: Bert Lunn, Kevin O'Connor, Ray Bell, C.J. MacDonald; Con: Ray Bell, Willis Perriam; Pen: Ray Bell, Willis Perriam		Pen: H.D. Harkness

Carisbrook, Dunedin
Referee: T.V. Cahill (North Otago)

13 August 1949

Otago	6–3	Southland
Pen: Ray Bell; Drop: L.S. Woodhouse		Pen: Tom Webster

Carisbrook, Dunedin
Referee: Bill Firmin (Wellington)

17 August 1949

Otago	27–5	Waikato
Try: Graham Moore (2), Willis Perriam, R.F. Waldron, Bert Lunn; Con: Willis Perriam (2), Ray Bell; Pen: Willis Perriam, Ray Bell		Try: B.A.C. Cowley; Con: G.R. Brunskill

Carisbrook, Dunedin
Referee: W. Bruce Mitchell (Southland)

17 September 1949

Otago	6–5	Taranaki
Try: N.M. McKenzie; Pen: Ray Bell		Try: Roy Roper; Con: M.S. Cockerill

Carisbrook, Dunedin
Referee: C.G. Wallace (Waikato)

28 September 1949

Otago	16–5	Auckland
Try: C.R. Moore, Ray Bell, Ross Wightman, L.S. Woodhouse; Con: Ray Bell (2)		Try: Ivan Versalko; Con: R.G. Sorenson

Carisbrook, Dunedin
Referee: George Sullivan (Taranaki)

== Sources ==
- "Ranfurly Shield". Rugby Redefined. 25 June 2020.
- Knight, Lindsay (1980). Shield Fever. Rugby Press. ISBN 0-9597553-8-1.
- Chester, Rod; McMillan, Neville; Palenski, Ron (1987). The Encyclopedia of New Zealand Rugby. Moa Publications. ISBN 0-908570-16-3.
