= 1953–54 New Zealand rugby union tour of Britain, Ireland, France and North America =

Summary
P	W	D	L
Total
36	30	2	4
Test match
5	3	0	2
Opponent
P	W	D	L
Wales
1	0	0	1
Ireland
1	1	0	0
England
1	1	0	0
Scotland
1	1	0	0
France
1	0	0	1

The 1953–54 New Zealand rugby union tour of Britain, Ireland, France and North America was a rugby union tour undertaken by the New Zealand national team which toured Europe and North America. The team was captained by Bob Stuart.

Between October 1953 and March 1954, the team played 36 games including four test matches, one each against Ireland, England, Wales, and France. They won all but four games, losing only to Cardiff, Wales, France and South West France.

== Matches ==
Scores and results list New Zealand's points tally first.

Opponent	For	Against	Date	Venue	Status
Southern Counties	24	0	31 October 1953	Greyhound Stadium, Hove	Tour match
Cambridge University	22	11	4 November 1953	Grange Road, Cambridge	Tour match
London Counties	11	0	7 November 1953	Twickenham, London	Tour match
Oxford University	14	5	11 November 1953	Iffley Road, Oxford	Tour match
Western Counties	11	0	14 November 1953	Memorial Ground, Bristol	Tour match
Llanelli	17	3	17 November 1953	Stradey Park, Llanelli	Tour match
Cardiff	3	8	21 November 1953	Arms Park, Cardiff	Tour match
Glasgow - Edinburgh	23	3	25 November 1953	Old Anniesland Ground, Glasgow	Tour match
South of Scotland	32	0	28 November 1953	Netherdale Ground, Galashiels	Tour match
North of Scotland	28	3	2 December 1953	Linksfield Stadium, Aberdeen	Tour match
Leicestershire & East Midlands	3	0	5 December 1953	Welford Road, Leicester	Tour match
South-Western Counties	9	0	9 December 1953	Recreation Ground, Camborne	Tour match
Swansea	6	6	12 December 1953	St Helen's, Swansea	Tour match
Wales	8	13	19 Decemb. 1953	Arms Park, Cardiff	Test match
Abertillery & Ebbw Vale	22	3	23 December 1953	Abertillery Ground, Abertillery	Tour match
Combined Services	40	8	26 December 1953	Twickenham, London	Tour match
Midland Counties	18	3	30 December 1953	Villa Park, Birmingham	Tour match
Ulster	5	5	2 January 1954	Ravenhill, Belfast	Tour match
Ireland	14	3	9 January 1954	Lansdowne Road, Dublin	Test match
Munster	6	3	13 January 1954	Mardyke Ground, Cork	Tour match
Pontypool & Cross Keys	19	6	16 January 1954	Pontypool Park, Pontypool	Tour match
Newport	11	6	21 January 1954	Rodney Parade, Newport	Tour match
Neath & Aberavon	11	5	23 January 1954	Gnoll Ground, Neath	Tour match
England	5	0	30 January 1954	Twickenham, London	Test match
North-Eastern Counties	16	0	6 February 1954	Lidget Green, Bradford	Tour match
Scotland	3	0	13 February 1954	Murrayfield, Edinburgh	Test match
North-Western Counties	17	3	17 February 1954	Maine Road, Manchester	Tour match
Barbarians	19	5	20 February 1954	Arms Park, Cardiff	Tour match
South-West France	8	11	24 February 1954	Club Athlétique Béglais, Bordeaux	Tour match
France	0	3	27 February 1954	Yves-du-Manoir, Colombes	Test match
South-Eastern Counties	21	13	1 March 1954	Portman Road, Ipswich	Tour match
Victoria (B.C.)	39	3	9 March 1954	MacDonald Park, Victoria	Tour match
Univ. of Br. Columbia	42	3	11 March 1954	University Stadium, Vancouver	Tour match
B.C. Mainland	37	11	13 March 1954	Brockton Point Oval, Vancouver	Tour match
University of California	14	6	17 March 1954	California Field, Berkeley	Tour match
California All Stars	20	0	20 March 1954	St Ignatius Field, San Francisco	Tour match

== Touring party ==
=== Management ===
- Manager: N. Millard
- Assistant manager: A. E. Marslin
- Captain: Bob Stuart

=== Backs ===
- Jack Kelly (Auckland)
- Bob Scott (Auckland)
- Morrie Dixon (Canterbury)
- Allan Elsom (Canterbury)
- Stu Freebairn (Manawatu)
- Ron Jarden (Wellington)
- Jim Fitzgerald (Wellington)
- John Tanner (Auckland)
- Brian Fitzpatrick (Wellington)
- Colin Loader (Wellington)
- Doug Wilson (Canterbury)
- Guy Bowers (Wellington)
- Laurie Haig (Otago)
- Vincent Bevan (Wellington)
- Keith Davis (Auckland)

=== Forwards ===
- Bill McCaw (Southland)
- Bob Stuart (Canterbury)
- Bill Clark (Wellington)
- Peter Jones (North Auckland)
- Bob O'Dea (Thames Valley)
- Desmond Oliver (Otago)
- Keith Bagley (Manawatu)
- Nelson Dalzell (Canterbury)
- Richard White (Poverty Bay)
- Ian Clarke (Waikato)
- Peter Eastgate (Canterbury)
- Kevin Skinner (Otago)
- Hallard White (Auckland)
- Ronald Hemi (Waikato)
- Arthur Woods (Southland)
