= John Madigan =

John Madigan may refer to:

- John Madigan (politician) (1966–2020), Australian politician
- John Madigan (Gaelic footballer) (fl. 2000s), Irish player of Gaelic football
- John Madigan (ringmaster) (1850–1897), American circus performer
- John Madigan (rugby union) (born 1994), Irish rugby union player
- John Madigan (sportsperson, born 1946) (1946–2023), Irish rugby union player
- John B. Madigan (1863–1918), justice of the Maine Supreme Judicial Court
