= Alone it Stands =

Play by John Breen

Alone It Stands is a 1999 comic play by John Breen based on a famous 1978 rugby union match at Thomond Park in Limerick between Irish provincial side Munster and the New Zealand national team, the All Blacks. The title is a quotation from "There Is An Isle", the Shannon RFC anthem, and it alludes to the fact that the match was the only defeat for the All Blacks during their 1978 tour of Britain and Ireland and their only loss to an Irish team until the national team won in Chicago in 2016. "In the play six actors play 62 roles including the Munster team, the Kiwis, the two coaches, the ref, the crowd, the press, a pregnant woman, several children and a dog." Alone It Stands makes no great claims for profundity (although it does add a somber note with the real-life death of the father(Dan Canniffe) of Munster captain Donal Canniffe during the match).

Breen, a Limerickman, remembered the 1978 match as "such a huge event from my childhood" that he was disappointed when its 20th anniversary passed unmarked, and he spent a year researching for a play. A coproduction of two Irish theatre companies, Yew Tree of Ballina, County Mayo and Island of Limerick, was ready for the match's 21st anniversary. After rehearsals and previews in Kilmallock, it premiered at Waterpark RFC and toured around Ireland for 18 months, playing larger venues as word-of-mouth recommendations accrued, taking in the Edinburgh Festival Fringe, and finishing in Dublin by moving from the Andrews Lane Theatre to the Gaiety Theatre. Breen won best director at the Irish Theatre Awards in February 2000.

The play ran in the Duchess Theatre in London's West End in 2002. It also toured New Zealand and Australia. Its New York premiere was at 59E59 Theaters in 2019. During New Zealand's 2008 rugby tour, they played Munster to mark the reopening of the redeveloped Thomond Park. Days before the match, which they narrowly won, the All Blacks attended a performance of Alone It Stands in Limerick. Since 2014 the play has been on the Irish Department of Education's list of set texts for the Junior Cycle Student Award in English.
