= Kevin Skinner (rugby union) =

New Zealand rugby union player

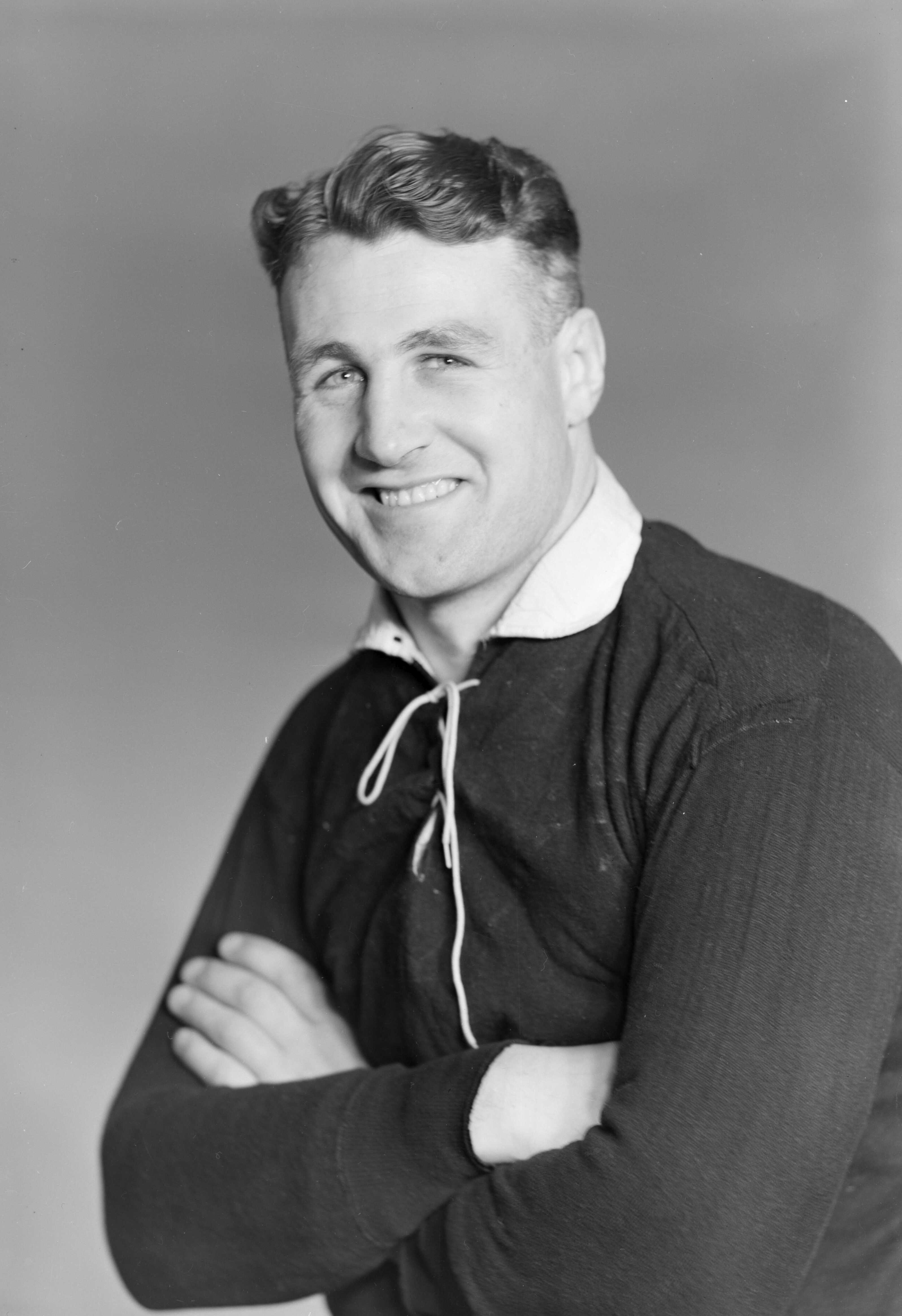
- Skinner in 1951
- Born: Kevin Lawrence Skinner; 27 November 1927 Dunedin, New Zealand
- Died: 21 July 2014 (aged 86) Auckland, New Zealand
- Height: 1.83 m (6 ft 0 in)
- Weight: 97 kg (214 lb)
- School: Christian Brothers High School; St. Kevin's College
- Notable relative: Arthur Hughes (cousin)

Rugby union career
- Position: Prop
Amateur team(s)
Years	Team	Apps	(Points)
1945–55	Dunedin Pirates		
1956	Waiuku		
Provincial / State sides
Years	Team	Apps	(Points)
1947–54	Otago		
1956	Counties		
International career
Years	Team	Apps	(Points)
1949–56	New Zealand	20	(3)

Kevin Lawrence Skinner (24 November 1927 – 21 July 2014) was a rugby union player from New Zealand who won 20 full caps for the All Blacks, two of them as captain. He was also a heavyweight boxer, winning the New Zealand championship in 1947.

== Early life ==
Born in Dunedin, Skinner was educated at Christian Brothers School, Dunedin and St. Kevin's College, Oamaru where he played in the first XV in 1943 and 1944. He captained the side in the latter year. In 1945 he played senior rugby for the Dunedin Pirates as lock. As a boxer, Skinner won the Otago heavyweight championship in 1946 and won the New Zealand heavyweight title in 1947.

== First-class career ==
In 1947, Skinner played nine matches for the Otago representative rugby union team, including the team's successful Ranfurly Shield challenge against Southland. He also played in the South Island team and represented Otago again in 1948.

Skinner played for Otago again from 1950 to 1954, and represented Counties in 1956 (from the Waiuku Club). He was in the South Island team each year from 1950 to 1953. He participated in the New Zealand trials in 1948, 1950, 1951 and 1953. He played for a combined Bay of Plenty-Thames Valley-Counties side against the Springboks in 1956.

== All Blacks ==
Skinner was selected for the 1949 All Black tour of South Africa. He continued playing for the All Blacks and was captain in the 1952 series against Australia. However Bob Stuart (also an old boy of St. Kevin's College, Oamaru) was captain of the 1953/4 All Blacks in their tour of Great Britain and France. Skinner also went on that tour and played in 27 games including all five tests. He was one of the key players.

Skinner retired at the end of the 1954 season after equaling Maurice Brownlie's record of 61 All Black appearances but he played again for the All Blacks for the final two tests against South Africa in 1956, extending the record to 63. Both those tests were won by New Zealand.

Skinner has been described as "a skilled lineout No.2, expert rush stopper, strong scrummager and extremely mobile" and "one of the very best props New Zealand has produced." He was inducted into the New Zealand Sports Hall of Fame in 1996.

== Death ==
Skinner died in Auckland on 21 July 2014. Among those sending their condolences was another rugby-boxer, Sonny Bill Williams.
