= Stu Freebairn =

New Zealand rugby player (1932–2025)

- Born: William Stuart Scott Freebairn; 12 January 1932 New Plymouth, New Zealand
- Died: 21 September 2025 (aged 93) Palmerston North, New Zealand
- Height: 175 cm (5 ft 9 in)
- Weight: 73 kg (161 lb; 11 st 7 lb)
- School: Feilding Agricultural High School
- Occupation: Pharmacist

Rugby union career
- Position: Wing
Provincial / State sides
Years	Team	Apps	(Points)
1952–1962	Manawatu	84	(159)
International career
Years	Team	Apps	(Points)
1953–1954	New Zealand		

William Stuart Scott Freebairn (12 January 1932 – 21 September 2025) was a New Zealand rugby union player. He was a wing threequarter known for his speed, evidenced by having competed in long jump and relay events in national athletics championships.

== Biography ==
Freebairn played for the Feilding Yellows at club level and Manawatu at provincial level, representing the province in 84 games in which he scored 53 tries.

Selected for the All Blacks at the age of 21, Freebairn played 14 matches on their 1953–54 New Zealand rugby union tour of Britain, Ireland, France and North America. On the tour he scored 30 points (10 tries), but he was unable to make the test team due to the presence of the incumbents Ron Jarden and Morrie Dixon.

After the tour, Freebairn was unavailable for rugby during the 1954 season while concentrating on his pharmacy studies. Although returning after his studies still a young man and continuing to play well for Manawatu and in All Blacks trials, he never regained selection to the All Blacks.

Freebairn died at Palmerston North on 21 September 2025, at the age of 93.
