= Dan Canniffe =

Irish hurler (1909–1978)

Personal information
- Born: 22 November 1909 The Lough, Cork, Ireland
- Died: 31 October 1978 (aged 68) Mayfield, Cork, Ireland
- Occupation: Garda Síochána

Sport
- Sport: Hurling
- Position: Full-back
Clubs
- Years: Club
- St. Finbarr's; Garda
Club titles
- Dublin titles: 0
Inter-county
- Years: County
- 1934 1937-1938: Dublin; Cork
Inter-county titles
- Leinster titles: 1
- All-Irelands: 0
- NHL: 0

Daniel Canniffe (22 November 1909 – 31 October 1978) was an Irish hurler. At club level he played with St. Finbarr's and Garda, and also lined out at inter-county level with Dublin and Cork

== Career ==
Canniffe first played hurling at club level with St. Finbarr's in Cork. After moving to Dublin he joined the Garda club, however, he enjoyed little in the way of club success.

As a member of the Dublin senior hurling team, Canniffe won a Leinster SHC medal and lined out at centre-back in a defeat by Limerick in the 1934 All-Ireland final replay. He later declared for the Cork senior hurling team and spent two seasons with the team.

== Personal life and death ==
Canniffe was born in the Lough area of Cork in November 1909. He joined the Garda Síochána and was stationed in a number of areas, including Dublin, Mullingar and County Leitrim, before returning to Cork.

Canniffe died suddenly at the age of 68 on 31 October 1978, on a day when his youngest son, Donal, captained Munster to a famous victory over the All Blacks.

== Honours ==
Dublin

- Leinster Senior Hurling Championship: 1934
