= Wally Argus =

- Born: Walter Garland Argus; 29 May 1921 Auckland, New Zealand
- Died: 21 October 2016 (aged 95) Christchurch, New Zealand
- Height: 1.85 m (6 ft 1 in)
- Weight: 85 kg (187 lb)
- School: Pleasant Point District High School

Rugby union career
- Position: Wing
Amateur team(s)
Years	Team	Apps	(Points)
1941–42, 46–49	Linwood		
Provincial / State sides
Years	Team	Apps	(Points)
1941–42, 46–49	Canterbury		
International career
Years	Team	Apps	(Points)
1946–47	New Zealand	4	(12)

Walter Garland Argus (29 May 1921 – 21 October 2016) was a New Zealand rugby union player who played 10 matches including four tests for the national team. From 16 November 2012 until his death he was the oldest living All Black.

== Early life and family ==
Argus was born in Auckland on 29 May 1921, the son of Ernest Edward Argus, a railway worker, and his second wife, Margaret Elizabeth Argus (née Olsen). He was educated at Albury School and Pleasant Point District High School in South Canterbury.

== Early rugby career ==
A wing three-quarter, Argus began playing senior club rugby for the Southern Football Club in 1938, and the same year made his representative debut for the Mackenzie sub-union. Following the outbreak of World War II, he moved to Christchurch, where he played for the Linwood club, and made the Canterbury provincial team in 1941 and 1942. From 1942, Argus served with the 2nd New Zealand Expeditionary Force (2NZEF) in North Africa and Italy.

== Post-war rugby career ==
After the end of the war, Argus was selected for the 2NZEF rugby team, known as the "Kiwis", that toured Britain and France. In his 12 matches for the team he scored 17 tries.

Back in New Zealand, Argus continued to play for Canterbury, and in 1946 he was selected for the New Zealand national side, the All Blacks. He made his international debut against the touring Australian side in the first test at Carisbrook in Dunedin. Argus scored two tries in the 31–8 win, and appeared again two weeks later in the second test at Eden Park, Auckland. The following year, Argus toured Australia with the national side, playing in eight of the nine matches on tour, including both of the test matches.

He was also selected for the 1949 tour to South Africa, but withdrew for business reasons and did not tour; he had just bought a market garden in Heathcote Valley, Christchurch. He also missed the opportunity to play Australia at home in 1949 because of injury. In all, Argus played 10 matches for the All Blacks, and scored 14 tries, including tries in three of the four test matches that he played in.

== Later life ==
Argus lived in retirement in Christchurch. After the death of Bob Scott in 2012, he was the oldest living All Black.

Argus died in Christchurch on 21 October 2016 after battling a short illness.

Records
Preceded by Bob Scott	Oldest living All Black; 16 November 2012 – 21 October 2016	Succeeded by Ron Elvidge
