= Kevin Stuart =

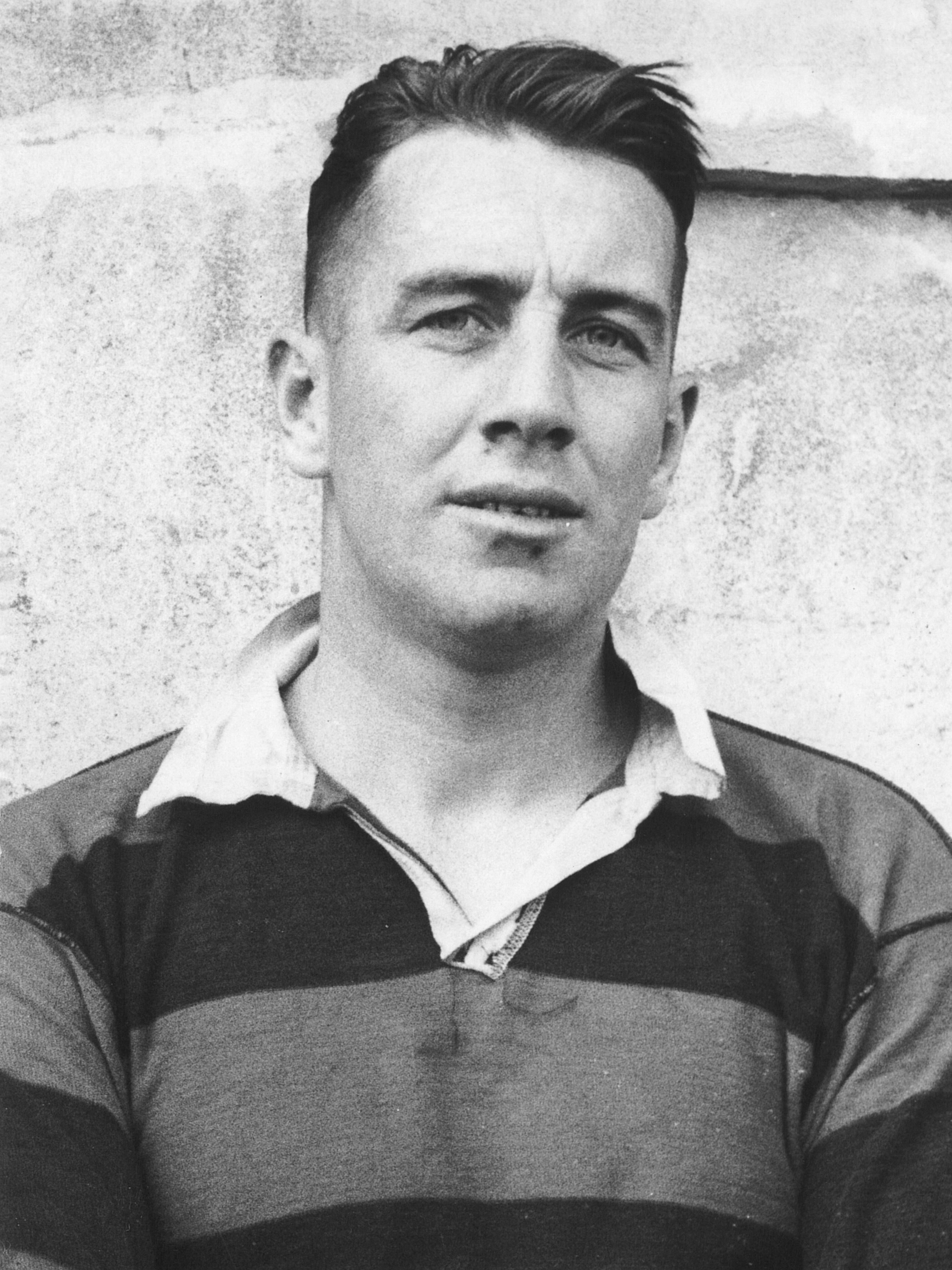
- Stuart in 1955
- Born: Kevin Charles Stuart; 19 September 1928 Dunedin, New Zealand
- Died: 12 April 2005 (aged 76) Havelock North, New Zealand
- Height: 1.84 m (6 ft 0 in)
- Weight: 84 kg (13 st 3 lb)
- School: St Bede's College
- Notable relative(s): Bob Stuart (brother); Jim Kearney (cousin); Cameron McIntyre (great-nephew)

Rugby union career
- Position: Fullback
Amateur team(s)
Years	Team	Apps	(Points)
- Christchurch Marist
Provincial / State sides
Years	Team	Apps	(Points)
1948–1956	Canterbury	79	(383)
International career
Years	Team	Apps	(Points)
1955	New Zealand	1	(0)

Kevin Charles Stuart (19 September 1928 – 12 April 2005) was a New Zealand rugby union player who represented the All Blacks in 1955. His position of choice was fullback.

Although born in Dunedin, Stuart was educated at St Bede's College, Christchurch where he was a member of the 1st XV between 1944 and 1946. He died in April 2005, and was buried at Havelock North Cemetery.

== Career ==
Stuart was described as a "grand all-round fullback and a fearless tackler". He was playing in his first season for the Christchurch Marist club when he made his debut for his province, Canterbury in 1948. He became very popular amongst the Canterbury supporters, mainly due to his defensive abilities.

In 1950 Stuart played in his first All Black trial, failing to be selected. Subsequently he was overlooked in both 1951 and 1952, but continued to be a major contribution to the Canterbury's Ranfurly Shield reign from 1953 to 1956. In 1955, aged 26, Stuart was given his All Black opportunity in the first test against Australia. Considered an average performance in the 15-8 win, many believed he would be selected again for the national side. He was one of five players selected for player of the year for the 1955 season. In his provincial career, Stuart played 79 games and scored 383 points. He scored 100 of those in 1951, a rare accomplishment in those days.

Injuries prevented Stuart from playing at his full potential thereafter. He broke an arm in 1954 during a Ranfurly Shield match against Otago. In 1956 he faced severe shoulder problems and based on medical advice, Stuart retired that year.

== Personal ==
Stuart was one of 13 foundation members of the Canterbury rugby club.

== Family ==
Stuart was part of a very notable family. His older brother, Bob, was an All Black between 1949 and 1954 and was captain of the side during 1953 and 1954. Another brother, John played for Canterbury in 1957. A cousin, Jim Kearney, was an All Black between 1947 and 1949.
