= Tom Webster (rugby union) =

- Full name: Thomas Robert Dobson Webster
- Born: 12 July 1920 Waikouaiti, New Zealand
- Died: 6 November 1972 (aged 52) Christchurch, New Zealand
- Height: 183 cm (6 ft 0 in)

Rugby union career
- Position: Fullback
International career
Years	Team	Apps	(Points)
1947	New Zealand		

Thomas Robert Dobson Webster (12 July 1920 — 6 November 1972) was a New Zealand rugby union international.

Webster was born in Waikouaiti and educated at Otago Boys' High School.

A fullback, Webster played most of his representative rugby for Southland and was in the team that defeated the touring Wallabies in 1946. He made the All Blacks squad for the 1947 tour of Australia as an understudy to Bob Scott and appeared in three uncapped matches, scoring a total of 38 points off his boot.

== See also ==
- List of New Zealand national rugby union players
