= Moss Keane =

Irish rugby union player

- Born: Maurice Ignatius Keane; 27 July 1948 Currow, County Kerry
- Died: 5 October 2010 (aged 62) Portarlington, County Laois
- School: St. Brendan's College, Killarney
- University: University College Cork

Rugby union career
- Position: Lock
Senior career
Years	Team	Apps	(Points)
- Lansdowne Football Club
- Correct as of 5 April 2007
Provincial / State sides
Years	Team	Apps	(Points)
- Munster
International career
Years	Team	Apps	(Points)
1974–1984	Ireland	51	(4)
1977	British & Irish Lions	1	(0)
- Correct as of 5 April 2007

Maurice Ignatius "Moss" Keane (27 July 1948 – 5 October 2010) was a Gaelic footballer and a rugby union footballer who played for Ireland and the British & Irish Lions.

== Life and career ==
Born at Currow in County Kerry, Keane started out as a Gaelic footballer, playing at college level for University College Cork and in the process winning a number of medals including three Sigerson Cups (1969, 1970, and 1972), one Cork County Championship (1969) and a Munster Club Championship. He also played in an All Ireland Club Final (1972). He represented Kerry Gaelic footballer's at U-21 and Junior level as a full back, winning Munster Championships at both levels, playing in an All Ireland at Junior level. In 2011 the Kerry County Board named the cup for the winners of the Intermediate Shield after him.

He then found rugby through a friend in college, playing for the UCC junior rugby team as 'Moss Fenton', during the Gaelic Athletic Association (GAA)'s ban on foreign games. When asked what he first thought about rugby he answered: "It was like watching a pornographic movie – very frustrating for those watching and only enjoyable for those participating." He made his international debut for Ireland on 19 January 1974 against France in Paris, a game Ireland lost 9–6 in the 1974 Five Nations Championship.

Keane became the third Irish forward after Willie John McBride and Fergus Slattery to reach 50 international appearances. He scored his one and only test try in a 22–15 victory over Scotland in February 1980.

He played his 51st and final international against Scotland on 3 March 1984 in Dublin. Ireland lost the match 32–9.

Keane was also a part of the famous Munster side that defeated the All Blacks in Thomond Park in 1978.

He toured New Zealand with Phil Bennett's British and Irish Lions in 1977, making one Test appearance, and was also a key man in Ireland's 1982 Five Nations Championship win and their historic Triple Crown victory in 1982.

== Outside sport ==
Having gained a master's degree in dairy science, Keane worked for the Department of Agriculture during his rugby playing career and retired in July 2010. He kept active playing golf on a weekly basis. In 1993 he was the victim of a vicious mugging.

In 2005 he wrote, with Billy Keane (no kin), his autobiography, called Rucks, Mauls and Gaelic Football.

== Illness and death ==
In 2009 it was reported that Keane was being treated for bowel cancer. He died aged 62 on 5 October 2010. Many tributes were made including Taoiseach Brian Cowen saying "one of the great gentleman of Irish sport, would be sadly missed by his many fans and admirers worldwide, Moss Keane was one of the finest rugby players Ireland has ever produced, He was among rugby's best known characters and a legend of the game at home and abroad". The IRFU paid tribute to Keane, describing him as one of Irish rugby's "most genuine characters and legends of the game", "Moss had ability on the field that no one could doubt from his record at club, provincial and international level, " IRFU President Caleb Powell said, "UCC, Lansdowne, Munster, Ireland and the British & Irish Lions all benefited from his presence and ensured that his reputation will live long in the memories of not only Irish rugby, but world rugby." Keane is survived by his wife Anne and his two daughters Sarah and Anne Marie. His funeral took place on 7 October in St Michael's Church Portarlington. Former Ireland international players, including Willie John McBride, Ollie Campbell, Tony Ward, Mick Galwey, Dick Spring, Donal Lenihan, Donal Spring and Ciaran Fitzgerald were in attendance. Keane's coffin was adorned with the jerseys of Ireland, Munster, UCC, Kerry and Currow.

== Honours ==
=== Ireland ===
- Five Nations Championship:
  - Winner (2): 1974, 1982
- Triple Crown:
  - Winner (1): 1982
