= Bill Haig =

New Zealand cricketer (1921–1967)

Personal information
- Full name: William Smith Haig
- Born: 6 April 1921; Prestonpans, Scotland
- Died: 21 August 1967 (aged 46); Dunedin, Otago, New Zealand
- Batting: Right-handed
- Bowling: Right-arm off-spin
- Relatives: Laurie Haig (brother); Jimmy Haig (brother)

Domestic team information
- Years: Team
- 1949/50–1957/58: Otago

Career statistics
Competition	First-class
Matches	31
Runs scored	1,062
Batting average	19.30
100s/50s	1/6
Top score	102
Balls bowled	1038
Wickets	15
Bowling average	23.66
5 wickets in innings	0
10 wickets in match	0
Best bowling	4/12
Catches/stumpings	18/–
- Source: ESPNcricinfo, 24 April 2021

William Smith Haig (6 April 1921 – 21 August 1967) was a New Zealand cricketer. He played 31 first-class matches, almost all of them for Otago between the 1949–50 and 1957–58 seasons.

== Life and career ==
Haig was born in Scotland. His family emigrated to New Zealand in the 1920s. His brothers Laurie and Jimmy represented New Zealand at rugby union, and another brother, Bert, represented Otago.

Haig served as a captain with the British Commonwealth Occupation Force in Japan after World War II. He returned to New Zealand in August 1947.

Haig was a right-handed batsman who usually batted at number three, and an occasional off-spinner. After scoring 151 for his club Grange in the opening match of Dunedin cricket in 1949-50 he was selected to play for Otago. In his second first-class match, against Auckland in 1949–50, batting at number six, he scored 67 and added 266 in 222 minutes for the fifth wicket with Bert Sutcliffe, who made 355. It was a record fifth-wicket partnership in New Zealand first-class cricket.

In 1954-55 Haig scored 102, his only century, in Otago's 10-wicket victory over Auckland, adding 199 for the third wicket with Sutcliffe; he also took 3 for 33 in Auckland's second innings. Against Wellington in 1956-57 he top-scored with 10 in Otago's brief first innings of 34, then in Wellington's first innings he set a New Zealand record by bowling 15 consecutive maiden overs, ending with figures of 20–17–12–4.

Haig had his most successful season in 1954–55, scoring 253 runs in the Plunket Shield at an average of 42.16. He played in a Test trial for South Island after the Shield season and before the series against England, but was unsuccessful.

Haig was a businessman in the frozen-food industry. His family and Bert Sutcliffe's were close friends. When Sutcliffe's sports shop in Dunedin failed in the early 1960s, he accepted the offer of a job with Haig's ice-cream company in Hamilton.
