= Arthur Hughes (rugby union) =

Arthur Hughes OBE JP
- Born: Arthur Maitland Hughes; 11 October 1924 Auckland, New Zealand
- Died: 20 June 2005 (aged 80) North Shore, Auckland, New Zealand
- Height: 1.78 m (5 ft 10 in)
- Weight: 87 kg (192 lb)
- School: Nelson College
- Notable relative: Kevin Skinner (cousin)
- Occupation: Managing director

Rugby union career
- Position: Hooker
Provincial / State sides
Years	Team	Apps	(Points)
1947–1950	Auckland		
International career
Years	Team	Apps	(Points)
1947–1950	New Zealand	6	(0)

Arthur Maitland Hughes OBE JP (11 October 1924 – 20 June 2005) was a New Zealand rugby union player. A hooker, Hughes represented Auckland at a provincial level, and was a member of the New Zealand national side, the All Blacks from 1947 to 1950. Unusually, he was selected for the All Blacks before making his provincial debut. He played seven matches for the All Blacks including six internationals.

Hughes retired from rugby in 1950 to concentrate on business interests and rose to become managing director of the family liquor firm, Hughes and Cossar. He also served as president of the Auckland Racing Club and the New Zealand Racing Conference.

In the 1985 Queen's Birthday Honours, Hughes was appointed an Officer of the Order of the British Empire, for services to racing administration.

Two years after his death in 2005, Hughes was inducted into the Waitakere Business Hall of Fame.
