= Graham Moore (rugby union) =

- Full name: Graham John Tarr Moore
- Born: 18 March 1923 Wellington, New Zealand
- Died: 27 January 1991 (aged 67) Masterton, New Zealand
- Height: 178 cm (5 ft 10 in)

Rugby union career
- Position: Wing
International career
Years	Team	Apps	(Points)
1949	New Zealand	1	(3)

Graham John Tarr Moore (18 March 1923 — 27 January 1991) was a New Zealand rugby union international.

Moore, born in Wellington, was educated at Dannevirke High School and played his early provincial rugby for Hawkes Bay, before switching to Otago after the war. He captained Otago's successful Ranfurly Shield defence in 1949.

A versatile back, Moore was capped once for the All Blacks, as part of a depleted side that played the Wallabies at Athletic Park in the 1949 Bledisloe Cup series. Selected as a fullback, he ended up playing on the wing after Jack McLean had to withdraw from the match and he scored the All Blacks' only try, in a 6–11 loss.

Moore was a medical practitioner in Masterton.

== See also ==
- List of New Zealand national rugby union players
