= Des Oliver =

New Zealand rugby union player and medical researcher

- Born: Desmond Oswald Oliver; 26 October 1930 Palmerston North, New Zealand
- Died: 25 October 1997 (aged 66) Horton-cum-Studley, Oxfordshire, England
- Height: 1.87 m (6 ft 2 in)
- Weight: 91 kg (201 lb)
- School: Palmerston North Boys' High School
- University: University of Otago
- Occupation: Nephrologist

Rugby union career
- Position: Flanker
Provincial / State sides
Years	Team	Apps	(Points)
1952–1953	Otago	17	
1954	Wellington	1	
International career
Years	Team	Apps	(Points)
1953–1954	New Zealand	2	(0)
1954	New Zealand Universities	3	

Desmond Oswald Oliver (26 October 1930 – 25 October 1997) was a New Zealand rugby union player and nephrologist.

Born in Palmerston North on 26 October 1930, Oliver was educated at Palmerston North Boys' High School, where he was a member of the school's 1st XV in 1948. He went on to study medicine at the University of Otago, graduating MB ChB in 1955.

A flanker, Oliver represented Otago and, briefly, Wellington at a provincial level, and was a member of the New Zealand national side, the All Blacks, on their 1953–54 tour of Britain, Ireland, France and North America. On that tour, he played 20 games, scoring 12 points, for the All Blacks, and appeared in two Test matches.

Oliver became a house surgeon at Wellington Hospital in 1954. He moved to the University of Oxford in 1961, where he was a lecturer and became a leading researcher in renal medicine. He was active in the development of kidney transplant programmes and dialysis technology. Oliver died of cancer at his home in Horton-cum-Studley, near Oxford, on 25 October 1997.
