= Rua Tipoki =

- Born: Te Rua Reihana Tipoki; 11 August 1975 (age 51) Te Puia Springs, New Zealand
- Height: 1.82 m (6 ft 0 in)
- Weight: 95 kg (14 st 13 lb)
- School: Waitakere College

Rugby union career
- Position: Centre
Provincial / State sides
Years	Team	Apps	(Points)
2004	Bay of Plenty	10	(15)
2005–06	North Harbour	18	(10)
2007–09	Munster	29	(15)
2011–12	East Coast	?	(?)
Super Rugby
Years	Team	Apps	(Points)
1999–2006	Blues	31	(30)
2000	Highlanders	?	(0)
2007	Crusaders	6	(5)
International career
Years	Team	Apps	(Points)
- New Zealand Māori

Te Rua Reihana Tipoki (born 11 August 1975 in Te Puia Springs, New Zealand) brought up in Te Araroa in Gisborne, is a rugby union player who captained North Harbour to Ranfurly Shield victory in 2006. Tipoki played for a wide variety of teams including Munster Rugby. He currently plays for Ruatoria-based East Coast.

== Early career in New Zealand ==
In his early career he played for Auckland Blues and Otago Highlanders in the Super 12 and the New Zealand 7s. He also played a major part in the Bay of Plenty Steamers first Ranfurly Shield win in 2004, played in the New Zealand Maori team which defeated the British and Irish Lions team for the first time ever in the history of Maori rugby in 2005, and led North Harbour to their first Ranfurly Shield victory in 2006. He played one season for the Crusaders in 2007, before departing to Munster.

== Munster ==
With Munster, he fashioned one of the best centre partnerships in the Heineken Cup with Lifeimi Mafi, playing with passion and flair, a strong tackle and a great handoff and step. He was part of the Munster team that won the Heineken Cup on 24 May 2008 beating Toulouse 16–13 in the final. In all he made 29 appearances (including 27 competitive & 10 Heineken Cup games) for Munster, scoring 3 tries. On 24 April 2009 Tipoki announced that he would return to his native New Zealand at the end of the season due to a hamstring injury that had consistently hampered him.

== East Coast comeback ==
After a couple of years of recuperation in New Zealand, in 2011 Tipoki signed for the Ruatoria based team, East Coast. In 2012 he captained the side to win the Meads Cup.
