= Larry Moloney =

Irish rugby union player (born 1951)

- Full name: Lawrence Anthony Moloney
- Born: 14 June 1951 (age 75) County Cork, Ireland

Rugby union career
- Position: Centre / Fullback
International career
Years	Team	Apps	(Points)
1976–78	Ireland	4	(0)

Lawrence Anthony Moloney (born 14 June 1951) is an Irish former rugby union international.

Born in County Cork, Moloney was educated at St Munchin's College and kicked the winning drop-goal in the 1968 Munster Schools Senior Cup final against Rockwell College, securing the school's first title.

Moloney was capped four times for Ireland between 1976 and 1978, while playing for Garryowen. He was used by Ireland as a fullback, considered his best position, but could also play as a centre.

In 1978, Moloney played on the Munster team that defeated the touring All Blacks.

== See also ==
- List of Ireland national rugby union players
