= John Breen (playwright) =

Irish playwright

John Breen is an Irish playwright, best known for his play Alone It Stands which tells the tale of Munster Rugby Team's legendary 12–0 victory over New Zealand's All Blacks in Thomond Park, Limerick in 1978. In the play, six actors play 62 roles including the Munster team, the New Zealanders, the two coaches, the ref, the crowd, the press, a pregnant woman, several children and a dog.

Breen also wrote Charlie, a work on Charles Haughey, the former Irish Taoiseach, who visits a small farmer in County Mayo on his way from launching what was to become the Céide Fields project. As the two men talk, Haughey's remarkable rise and fall is acting out in flashback around them.
