= Bert Lunn =

NZ international rugby union player

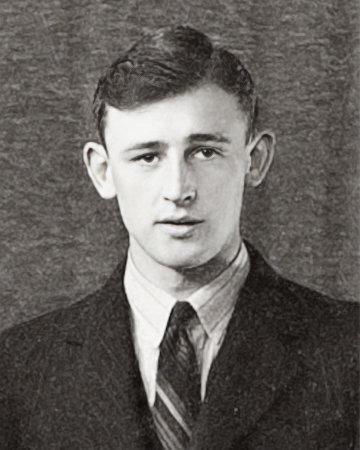
- Lunn in 1944
- Born: William Albert Lunn; 17 September 1926 Alexandra, New Zealand
- Died: 22 December 1996 (aged 70) Alexandra, New Zealand
- Height: 1.85 m (6 ft 1 in)
- Weight: 90 kg (200 lb)
- School: Alexandra District High School
- University: Canterbury Agricultural College

Rugby union career
- Position: Flanker
Provincial / State sides
Years	Team	Apps	(Points)
	Otago	41	
International career
Years	Team	Apps	(Points)
1949	New Zealand	2	(0)

William Albert Lunn (17 September 1926 – 22 December 1996), commonly known as Bert Lunn or Bill Lunn, was a New Zealand rugby union player.

Lunn played 47 first class games, of which all but six were for Otago. A flanker, he played in two matches for the New Zealand national side, the All Blacks, both of them tests against the touring Australian team in 1949.
