= John Madigan (sportsperson, born 1946) =

Irish rugby union player and hurler (1946–2023)

- Born: 1946 Charleville, Ireland
- Died: 1 August 2023 (aged 76) Cork, Ireland

Rugby union career
Amateur team(s)
Years	Team	Apps	(Points)
- UL Bohemians
Senior career
Years	Team	Apps	(Points)
- Munster

John Madigan (1946 – 1 August 2023) was an Irish hurler and rugby union player. As a hurler, he played with club side Charleville and divisional team Avondhu, while as a rugby player he lined out with UL Bohemians and Munster.

== Career ==
Madigan began his sporting career as a hurler with Charleville. In 1970, he was part of the club's junior team that won the North Cork JHC title for the first time in 25 years. Madigan continued to play well into his forties, and won further divisional titles in 1974 and 1986. He also earned selection to the Avondhu divisional team.

Madigan's rugby union career began with Charleville RFC, before transferring to Ennis RFC where he worked with the P&T. He then moved to UL Bohemians and served as club captain for a number of years. In 1973, Madigan lined out for Munster against the All Blacks in a 3–3 draw. The following year, he was again part of the Munster team All Blacks in a 14–4 defeat by the All Blacks. Madigan was part of the UL Bohemians team beaten by Young Munster in the Munster Senior Cup final in 1980. His son, John Madigan Jnr, also played for Munster.

== Death ==
Madigan died on 1 August 2023, at the age of 76.

== Honours ==
Charleville

- North Cork Junior Hurling Championship: 1970, 1974, 1986
