= Arthur Woods (rugby union) =

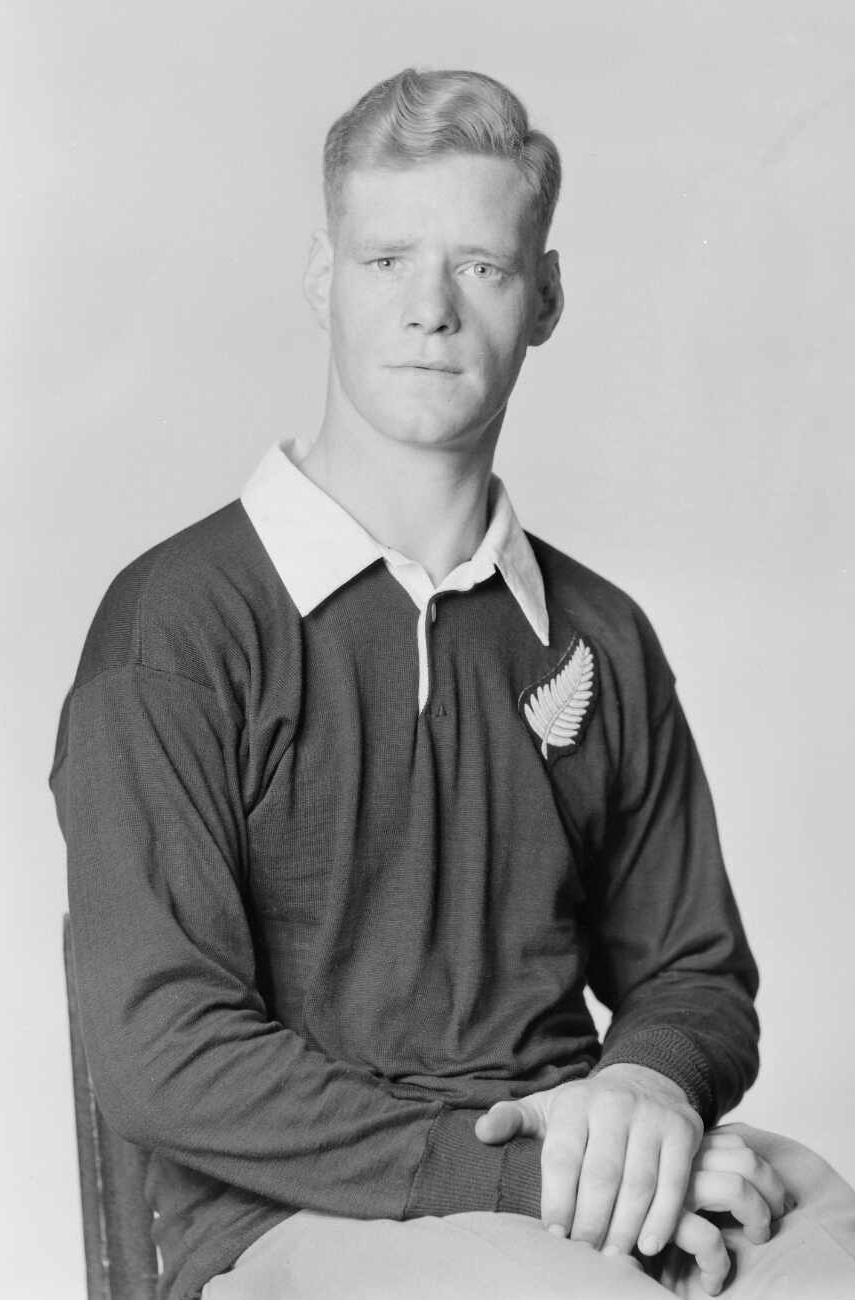
- Woods in 1953
- Born: Charles Arthur Woods; 5 August 1929 Winton, New Zealand
- Died: 7 October 2015 (aged 86) Winton, New Zealand
- Height: 1.83 m (6 ft 0 in)
- Weight: 87 kg (192 lb)
- School: Winton District High School
- Occupation: Farmer

Rugby union career
- Position: Hooker
Provincial / State sides
| Years | Team | Apps | (Points) |
| 1951–56 | Southland | 42 | |
International career
| Years | Team | Apps | (Points) |
| 1953–54 | New Zealand | 0 | (0) |

Charles Arthur Woods (5 August 1929 – 7 October 2015) was a New Zealand rugby union player. A hooker, Woods represented Southland at a provincial level. He was a member of the New Zealand national side, the All Blacks, on their tour of Britain, Ireland, France and North American in 1953–54. On that tour he played 14 matches, but did not appear in any internationals.
