= Lifeimi Mafi =

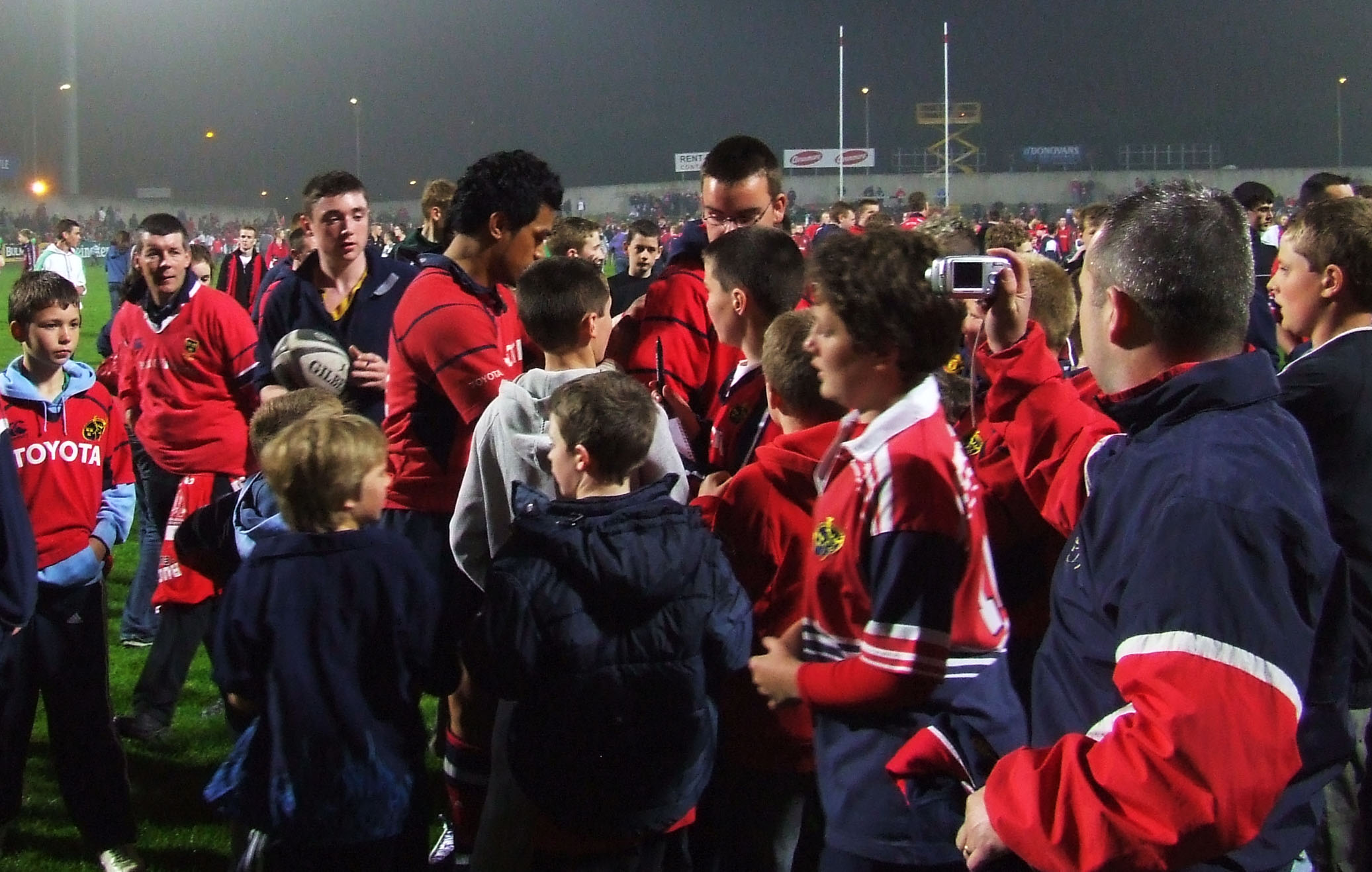
- image of Lifeimi Mafi on pitch after a match, was a rugby player.
- Full name: Lifeimi Olotolangi Mafi
- Born: 15 August 1982 (age 44) Nukuʻalofa, Tonga
- Height: 183 cm (6 ft 0 in)
- Weight: 90 kg (198 lb; 14 st 2 lb)
- School: Palmerston North Boys' High School

Rugby union career
- Position(s): Centre, Wing
Senior career
Years	Team	Apps	(Points)
2002–2018	Manawatu	25	(35)
2004–2006	Taranaki	25	(25)
2006–2012	Munster	141	(70)
2012–2018	Perpignan	151	(90)
- Correct as of 12 May 2020
International career
Years	Team	Apps	(Points)
2002–2003	New Zealand U21	9	(10)
- Correct as of 12 May 2020
National sevens team
Years	Team		Comps
2003–2005	New Zealand		8
- Correct as of 12 May 2020

Lifeimi Mafi (born 15 August 1982) is a Tongan-born, New Zealand former rugby union player.

== Career in New Zealand ==
Born in Nukuʻalofa, Tonga, Mafi initially played his club rugby with Kia Toa (Kia Toa is a Māori term which translates to "be brave"), based in the suburb of Awapuni, Palmerston North. It is one of the oldest clubs in Manawatu, and produced former Munster fullback Christian Cullen, Bristol number 8 Dan Ward-Smith, and former Black Ferns captain Farah Palmer. He represented Manawatu in 2003, before moving to Taranaki in 2004 in time to play the British and Irish Lions in 2005. He made 25 appearances for Taranaki, and was named their "Back of the Season" in 2006. Mafi was also called into the Hurricanes squad in 2006 as replacement for the injured Conrad Smith, although he never took the field in a Super Rugby match.

Mafi represented New Zealand at U19 and U21 level. He played alongside players of the calibre of Ben Atiga, Jimmy Cowan, John Afoa, Stephen Donald and Sam Tuitupou in the 2003 U21 RWC against Australia. Mafi was also part of the 2005 New Zealand Sevens squad which won the World Series, and played alongside Maori captain Liam Messam, and All Blacks Joe Rokocoko, Isaia Toeava and Rudi Wulf.

== Munster ==
Mafi's first appearance in a Munster jersey came during the close, hard fought win against Leicester Tigers at Welford Road in Round 1 of the 2006–07 Heineken Cup. Mafi was only on the pitch for a few minutes, but during that time he found himself on the wrong end of a trademark hit from Fijian centre Seru Rabeni. However, Mafi's home debut in Thomond Park, in the trouncing of French outfit Bourgoin, was more impressive. Sprung from the bench with 10 minutes to go, a scintillating break and hand-off resulted in a try for substitute hooker Andi Kyriacou.

Mafi first got on the scoresheet himself in the narrow away defeat to the Dragons, a game in which he scored two tries. He also finished a crucial score in the Heineken Cup round 5 game away to Bourgoin, and ran 50 metres to score his final try of the season at Musgrave Park in the end of season game against Glasgow Warriors. In all, Mafi scored 4 tries in 16 starts in his first season, but was criticised for his defensive decisions, often rushing out of the defensive line and leaving a space for opponents to exploit.

His second season in Munster was drastically more successful, even though he only managed 2 tries throughout. The presence of Māori Rua Tipoki had a calming effect on Mafi's defensive play, and the Munster centre partnership of Mafi-Tipoki was not exposed as much as the previous season's combination of Barry Murphy and Mafi, or Trevor Halstead and Mafi. Despite only scoring 3 tries between them in the victorious 2007–08 Heineken Cup campaign, their understanding of each other's play was crucial to Munster's success. Their attacking play was epitomised by Tipoki's score against Wasps in round 1 of the Heineken Cup at the Ricoh Arena, which was created by Mafi. Mafi himself scored a vital try away to French side Clermont, which secured a crucial losing bonus point which safe guarded Munster's passage to the quarter-finals. Mafi and Tipoki formed Munster's vital centre partnership as they went on to capture their second Heineken Cup crown in May 2008. Mafi was nominated for Munster Player of the Year for the 2007–08 season, and in stark contrast to his debut in Welford Road, Toulouse centre Yannick Jauzion and Gloucester hooker Andy Titterell found themselves at the end of crunching tackles from the Kiwi Centre. However, Tipoki's departure at the end of the 2008–09 season led to a short lapse in Mafi's form for Munster.

The 2010–11 season saw a great deal of competition for places in the Munster team, with Sam Tuitupou, Johne Murphy and Keith Earls all competing with Mafi for centre places, and as a result Mafi spent some of the season either on the bench or dropped entirely. However, the latter half of the season saw a resurgence in his form on the pitch, and Mafi nailed down the 12 jersey. He often cooperated with Johne Murphy or Keith Earls, but, towards the end of the season, he played with Paul Warwick and Danny Barnes. The 2010–11 season also saw Mafi win his 100th cap for Munster, and he was an integral part of the team that triumphed over Ospreys and Leinster as Munster secured the 2010–11 Magners League.

Contrary to a persistent rumour, having played IRB 7s for New Zealand, Mafi was never eligible to play for Ireland. He is however, considered an honorary Munsterman and is known as Larry Murphy to the Thomond faithful. He formerly represented New Zealand 7s, U19s & U21s before joining the Irish province in October 2006. The centre is a holder of a Tongan passport, meaning he is not regarded as an "overseas" player in either the Celtic League or Heineken Cup, which allowed him to take to the field alongside Munster's other "overseas" players such as New Zealand's top international try scorer Doug Howlett.

== Perpignan ==
Mafi's move to French Top 14 side Perpignan was announced by then-Munster coach Tony McGahan in an interview on 22 March 2012. He joined Perpignan for the start of the 2012–13 season. Mafi made his debut for Perpignan on 18 August 2012, in the first round of the 2012–13 Top 14 against Toulon.

== Return to New Zealand ==
Mafi and his family returned to New Zealand after he left Perpignan at the end of the 2017–18 Top 14 season, with Mafi rejoining Manawatu Turbos for the 2018 Mitre 10 Cup. He retired from rugby upon the conclusion of Manawatu's involvement in the competition.

== Honours ==
=== Munster ===
- Heineken Cup Winner : 2007–08
- Celtic League Winner : 2008–09, 2010–11
