= Rex Orr =

- Born: Rex William Orr; 19 June 1923 Gore, New Zealand
- Died: 1 September 2011 (aged 88) Christchurch, New Zealand
- Height: 1.73 m (5 ft 8 in)
- Weight: 72 kg (159 lb)
- School: Gore High School
- Occupation(s): RNZAF pilot Physical education teacher

Rugby union career
- Position: Fullback
Provincial / State sides
Years	Team	Apps	(Points)
- Otago
-	Auckland		
International career
Years	Team	Apps	(Points)
1949	New Zealand	1	(0)

Rex William Orr (19 June 1923 – 1 September 2011) was a New Zealand rugby union player. A fullback, Orr represented Otago and Auckland at a provincial level. He was a member of the New Zealand national side, the All Blacks, in 1949, playing a single international match against Australia.
