= Jim Fitzgerald (rugby union) =

- Full name: James Train Fitzgerald
- Born: 6 August 1928 Petone, New Zealand
- Died: 13 May 1993 (aged 64) Christchurch, New Zealand
- Height: 175 cm (5 ft 9 in)

Rugby union career
- Position: Centre
International career
Years	Team	Apps	(Points)
1952	New Zealand	1	(3)

James Train Fitzgerald (6 August 1928 — 13 May 1993) was a New Zealand rugby union international.

Born in Petone, Fitzgerald attended Hutt Valley High School and was a schoolmate of cricketer John Reid.

Fitzgerald, an Otago representative early in his career, played rugby at Victoria University and in his first year with Wellington earned All Blacks selection for the 1952 home Bledisloe Cup series. He debuted in the 1st Test at Lancaster Park and despite scoring a try in the opening five minutes, was omitted for the next match, with the All Blacks making several team changes as the result of a Wallabies win. This remained his only Test appearance but he was later on the 1953–54 tour of Britain, Ireland, France and North America, scoring 10 tries from 16 uncapped matches.

== See also ==
- List of New Zealand national rugby union players
