= Ron Elvidge =

New Zealand rugby union player (1923–2019)

- Born: Ronald Rutherford Elvidge; 2 March 1923 Timaru, New Zealand
- Died: 30 March 2019 (aged 96) Auckland, New Zealand
- Height: 1.80 m (5 ft 11 in)
- Weight: 83 kg (183 lb)
- School: John McGlashan College
- University: University of Otago
- Occupation: Gynaecologist

Rugby union career
- Position: Second five-eighth, centre
Provincial / State sides
Years	Team	Apps	(Points)
1942–50	Otago	30	
International career
Years	Team	Apps	(Points)
1946–50	New Zealand	9	(12)

Ronald Rutherford Elvidge (2 March 1923 – 30 March 2019) was a New Zealand rugby union player. A second five-eighth and centre, Elvidge represented Otago at a provincial level, and was a member of the New Zealand national side, the All Blacks, from 1946 to 1950. He played 19 matches for the All Blacks, of which seven were as captain, including nine internationals.

He worked as an obstetrician and gynaecologist. After the death of Wally Argus in 2016, Elvidge became the oldest living All Black.

Elvidge died in Auckland on 30 March 2019, aged 96.

Since 1946, his secondary school, John McGlashan College, have participated in their annual inter-house competition for the Elvidge Cup, named in his honour.

Records
Preceded by Wally Argus	Oldest living All Black; 21 October 2016 – 30 March 2019	Succeeded by Roy Roper
