= Doug Wilson (rugby union) =

New Zealand rugby union player (1931–2019)

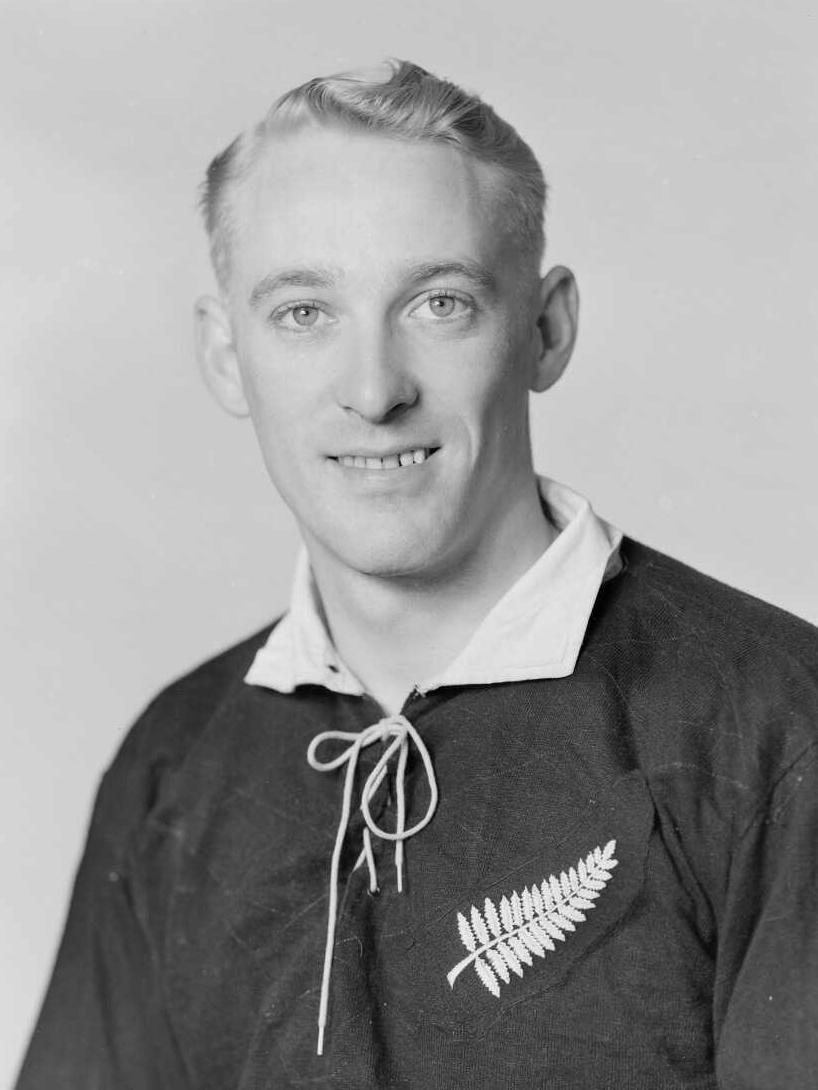
- Wilson in 1953
- Born: Douglas Dawson Wilson; 30 January 1931 Wanganui, New Zealand
- Died: 18 May 2019 (aged 88) Whanganui, New Zealand
- Height: 1.78 m (5 ft 10 in)
- Weight: 73 kg (161 lb)
- School: Christchurch Boys' High School
- Occupation: Menswear retailer

Rugby union career
- Position(s): First five-eighth Second five-eighth
Provincial / State sides
Years	Team	Apps	(Points)
1952–54	Canterbury		
1955–58	Wellington		
International career
Years	Team	Apps	(Points)
1953–54	New Zealand	2	(0)

Douglas Dawson Wilson (30 January 1931 – 18 May 2019) was a New Zealand rugby union player.

A first and second five-eighth, Wilson represented Canterbury and Wellington at a provincial level, and was a member of the New Zealand national side, the All Blacks, on their 1953–54 tour of Britain, Ireland, France and North America. On that tour, he played 14 matches, including two internationals, and scored five tries and one drop goal.

He died in Kowhainui Hospital, Whanganui, on 18 May 2019. He had been married to Janice for 64 years.
