= Ian Botting =

New Zealand & England international rugby union player

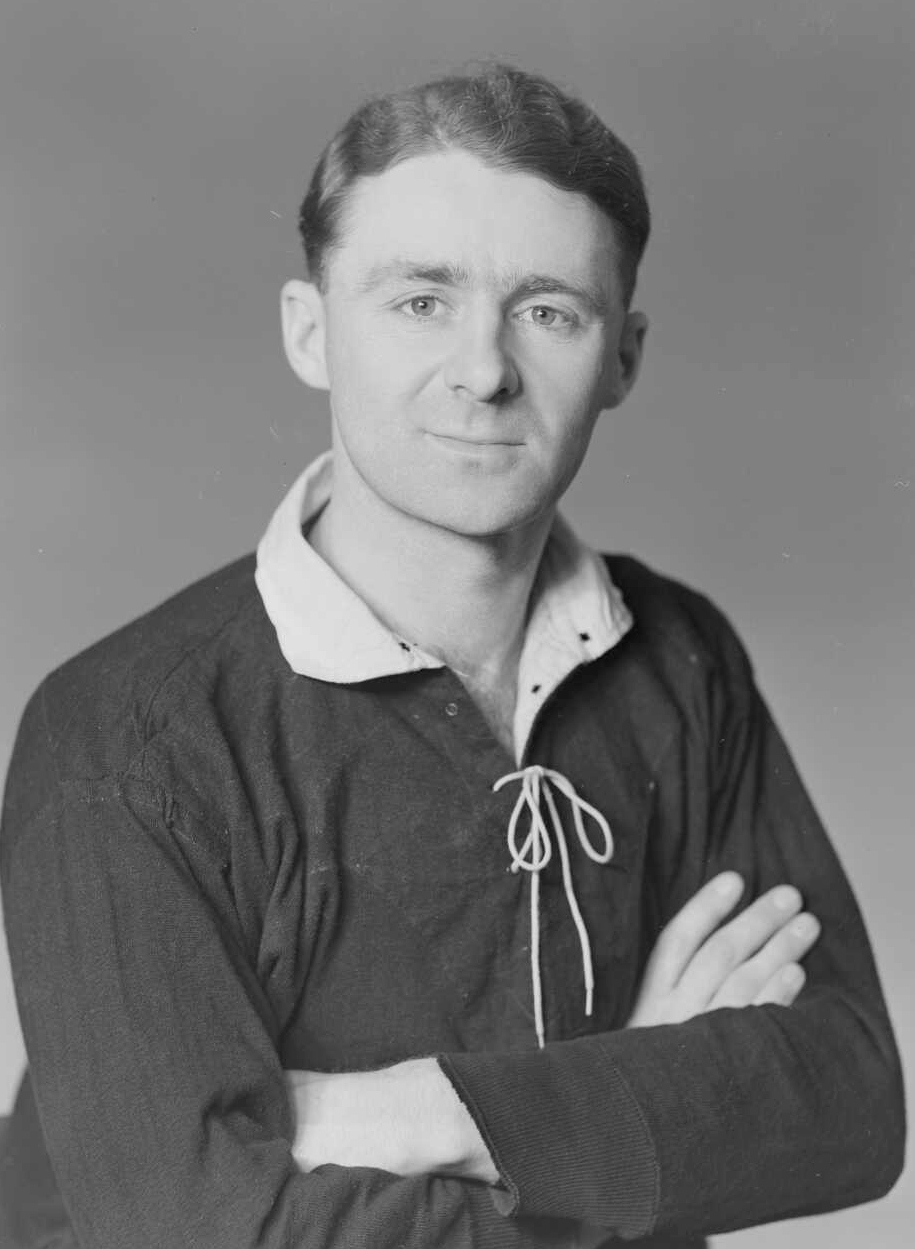
- Botting in 1948
- Born: Ian James Botting; 18 May 1922 Dunedin, New Zealand
- Died: 9 July 1980 (aged 58) Christchurch, New Zealand
- Height: 1.82 m (6 ft 0 in)
- Weight: 78 kg (172 lb)
- School: Christ's College
- University: University of Otago; University of Oxford
- Occupation: Anglican priest

Rugby union career
- Position: Wing
Provincial / State sides
| Years | Team | Apps | (Points) |
- Otago
| 1951–1953 | Leicester Tigers | 38 | (45) |
International career
| Years | Team | Apps | (Points) |
| 1949 | New Zealand | 0 | (0) |
| 1950 | England | 2 | (0) |

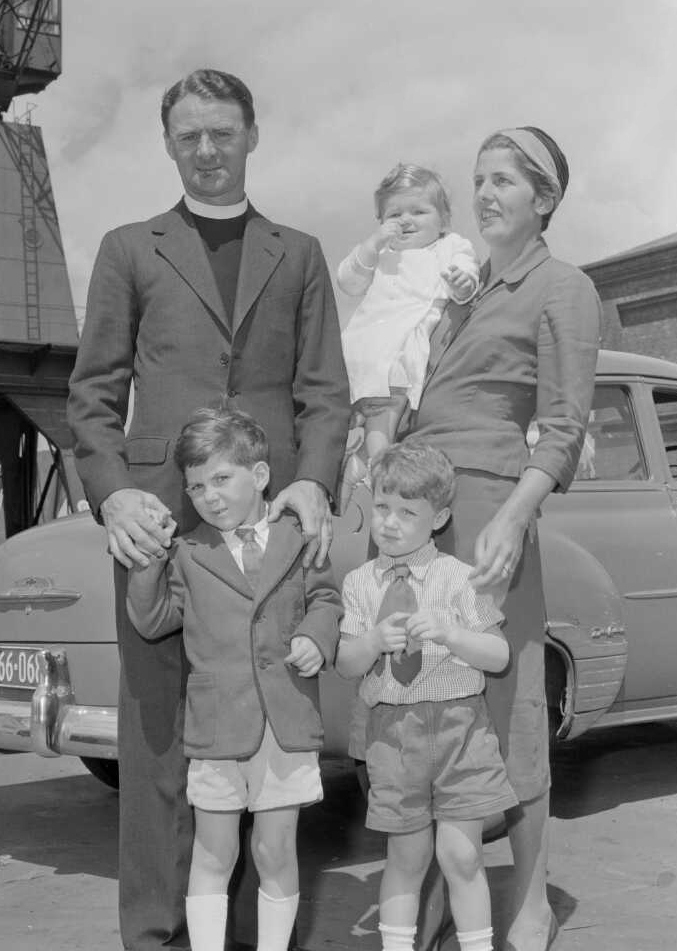
Botting with family in 1959

Ian James Botting (18 May 1922 – 9 July 1980) was a New Zealand rugby union player who represented both his country of birth and England. A wing three-quarter, Botting played for Otago at a provincial level, and was a member of the New Zealand national side, the All Blacks, on their 1949 tour of South Africa. He played nine matches for the All Blacks on that tour, but did not appear in any internationals. Following the tour, Botting became a student at the University of Oxford and in 1950 he made two test appearances for England in that year's Five Nations Championship. He joined Leicester Tigers in 1951 and made his debut 1 December 1951 against Harlequins. He played in 38 matches for Leicester, scoring 15 tries, his final match was on Tuesday 7 April 1953 against Exeter.

An ordained Anglican minister, Botting was killed when he was knocked from his bicycle by a motor vehicle in Christchurch in 1980.
