= Keith Bagley =

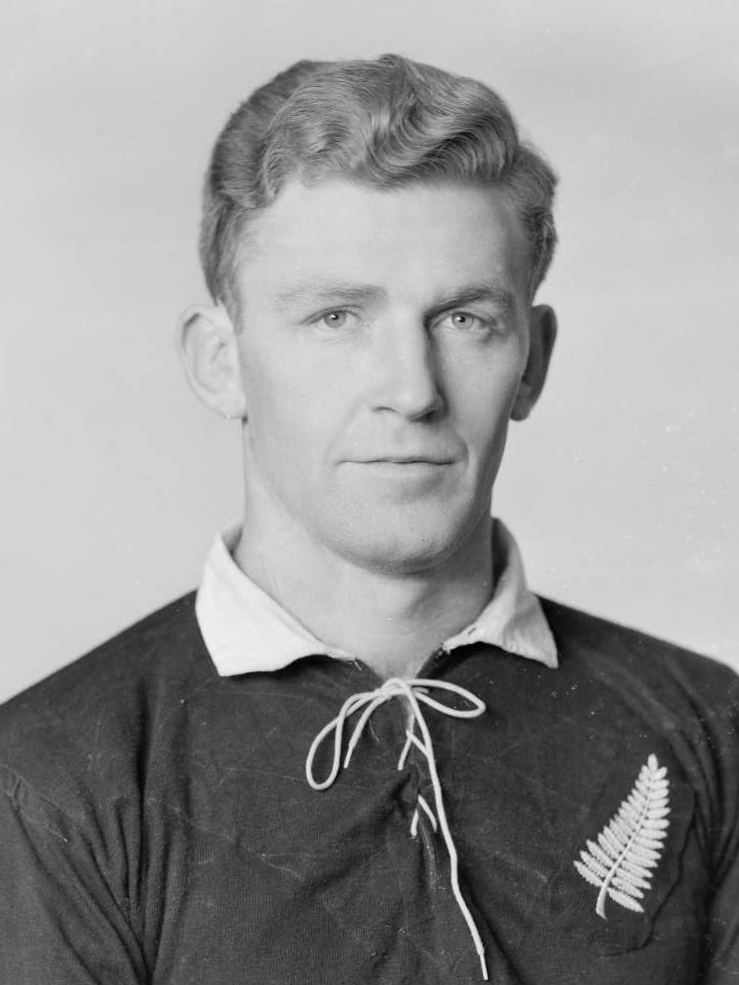
- Bagley in 1953
- Born: Keith Parker Bagley; 10 February 1931 Gisborne, New Zealand
- Died: 5 July 1999 (aged 68) Gisborne, New Zealand
- Height: 1.90 m (6 ft 3 in)
- Weight: 98 kg (216 lb)
- School: Gisborne Boys' High School
- University: Massey Agricultural College

Rugby union career
- Position: Lock
Provincial / State sides
Years	Team	Apps	(Points)
1951	Poverty Bay		
1951	Waikato		
1952–54	Manawatu		
1957	East Coast	1	
International career
Years	Team	Apps	(Points)
1953–54	New Zealand	0	(0)

Keith Parker Bagley (10 February 1931 – 5 July 1999) was a New Zealand rugby union player. A lock, Bagley represented Poverty Bay, Waikato, Manawatu, and East Coast at a provincial level. He was a member of the New Zealand national side, the All Blacks, on their 1953–54 tour of Britain, Ireland, France and North America, playing in 20 of the 36 games on tour, and scoring one try. However, he did not appear in any of the Test matches.

Bagley died in Gisborne on 5 July 1999, and was buried at Taruheru Cemetery.
