= Jim Kearney (rugby union) =

James Charles Kearney
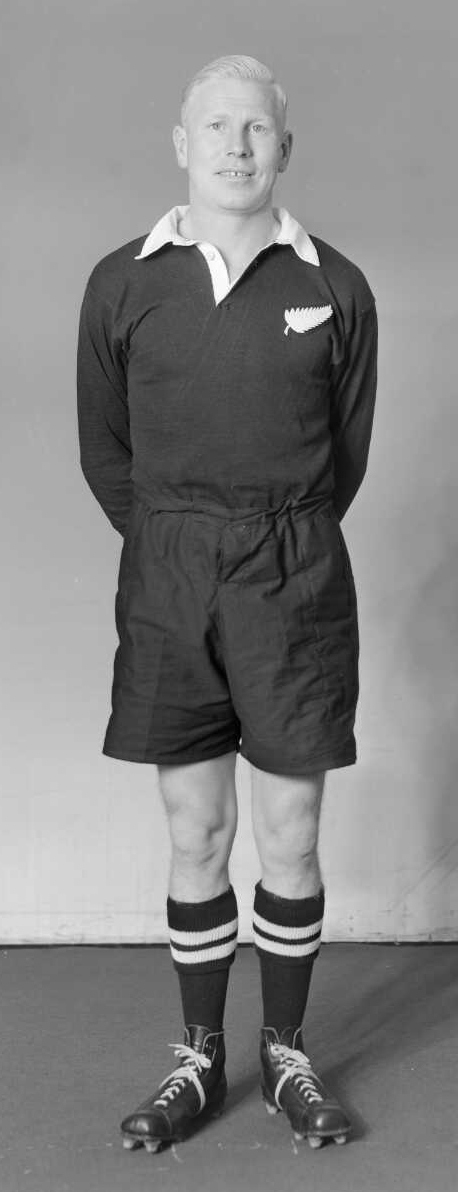
- Kearney in 1949
- Born: James Charles Kearney; 4 April 1920 Naseby, New Zealand
- Died: 1 October 1998 Ranfurly, New Zealand
- Height: 1.73 m (5 ft 8 in)
- Weight: 76 kg (12 st 0 lb)
- School: St. Kevin's College, Oamaru
- Notable relative(s): Bob Stuart, Kevin Stuart (cousins)

Rugby union career
- Position: First five-eighth
Amateur team(s)
Years	Team	Apps	(Points)
- Ranfurly
Provincial / State sides
Years	Team	Apps	(Points)
- Otago
International career
Years	Team	Apps	(Points)
1947-49	All Blacks		(30)

James Charles Kearney (4 April 1920 – 1 October 1998) was a New Zealand international rugby union player. He was a member of the New Zealand national rugby union team (All Blacks) in 1947 and 1949 as a fly half. He played for various New Zealand provinces before retiring in 1949. He died on 1 October 1998.

== Early life ==
Kearney was born in Naseby, New Zealand and educated at St. Kevin's College, Oamaru where he played rugby for the school.

== Senior rugby ==
Kearney played club rugby Ranfurly and represented Otago in 1939, 1941 and 1947–1948. In 1942 he played for the Brigade and represented Canterbury. In 1943 he was playing for the Canterbury Yeomanry Cavalry club and in that year represented Ashburton County. He played rugby for the New Zealand Army in the Second World War whilst a member of the 2nd New Zealand Expeditionary Force in 1945 and 1946. In the New Zealand Army team he played only 11 of 38 matches because of injury. But he did play in an unofficial match against the Scotland national rugby union team at Murrayfield Stadium. He played for the South Island Team in 1947 and 1948 and was a New Zealand trialist in both those years.

== International career ==
Kearney was selected for the 1947 All Blacks and toured Australia, playing in the second test, and South Africa in 1949, playing in the first three tests. In the 22 matches (4 tests) he played as an All Black, Kearney scored 30 points for New Zealand (6 tries and 4 drop goals) and 9 test points (1 try and 2 drop goals). He was also selected for the 1949 New Zealand rugby union tour of South Africa. He started in the 10-8 loss to Rhodesia and played in two of the Test matches against the South Africa national rugby union team. Kearney retired from rugby after the tour. He died in 1998.
