= John Foley (rugby union) =

Irish rugby union player

- Born: 3 April 1997 (age 29) Waterford, County Waterford, Ireland
- Height: 1.91 m (6 ft 3 in)
- Weight: 104 kg (16.4 st; 229 lb)
- School: St. Munchin's College

Rugby union career
- Position(s): Back-Row, Lock
Amateur team(s)
Years	Team	Apps	(Points)
2018–present	Young Munster RFC		
Senior career
Years	Team	Apps	(Points)
2016–2018	Munster	1	(0)
- Correct as of 9 May 2018
International career
Years	Team	Apps	(Points)
2017	Ireland U20	4	(0)
- Correct as of 18 June 2017

John Foley (born 3 April 1997) is an Irish rugby union player. He can play across the back-row or as a lock and represents Young Munster in the All-Ireland League.

== Early life ==
Born in Clonlara, County Clare, Foley first played underage rugby for UL Bohemians before attending St. Munchin's College. He won inter-provincial honours with Munster at Under-18 and Under-20 level, as well as representing Ireland at Under-18 level.

== Munster ==
On 11 November 2016, Foley made his competitive debut for Munster when he came on as a substitute against the Māori All Blacks in a capped friendly in Thomond Park, which Munster won 27–14. He was released from the Munster Academy programme at the end of the 2017–18 season.

== Ireland ==
On 17 March 2017, Foley made his debut for Ireland U20, starting for the side in their 14–10 defeat against England U20 in Donnybrook Stadium. Foley was also selected in the Ireland Under-20s squad for the 2017 World Rugby Under 20 Championship.
