= John Madigan (Gaelic footballer) =

Irish Gaelic footballer

Personal information
- Native name: Seán Ó Madagain (Irish)
- Born: Ireland

Sport
- Sport: Gaelic football
- Position: Right half back
Club
- Years: Club
- ? -?: Ballyroan Abbey
Inter-county
- Years: County
- ?- ?: Laois

John Madigan is a Gaelic footballer from County Laois.

At club level, Madigan usually lines out at centre half back with Ballyroan Abbey and in 2006 he captained the Ballyroan/Abbeyleix combination, Ballyroan Gaels to the Laois Senior Football Championship title.

His performances at club level earned him a call up to the Laois senior football squad from new manager, Liam Kearns.
