= Donal Canniffe =

Irish rugby player (born 1949)

- Full name: Donal Martin Canniffe
- Born: 14 August 1949 (age 77)

Rugby union career
- Position: Scrum-half
International career
Years	Team	Apps	(Points)
1976	Ireland	2	(0)

Donal Martin Canniffe (born 14 August 1949) is an Irish former rugby union international.

Canniffe, the youngest son of Irish hurler Dan Canniffe, was raised in Cork.

A scrum-half, Canniffe played for Cork Constitution, Munster and Lansdowne. He was capped twice for Ireland in the 1976 Five Nations Championship and was the reserve scrum-half to John Robbie on that year's tour of New Zealand, during which he suffered a tour ending ankle injury. In 1978, he was captain of the Munster side that defeated the All Blacks at Thomond Park, then found out after the match that his father had collapsed at half-time and died.

== See also ==
- List of Ireland national rugby union players
