= Maurice Dixon =

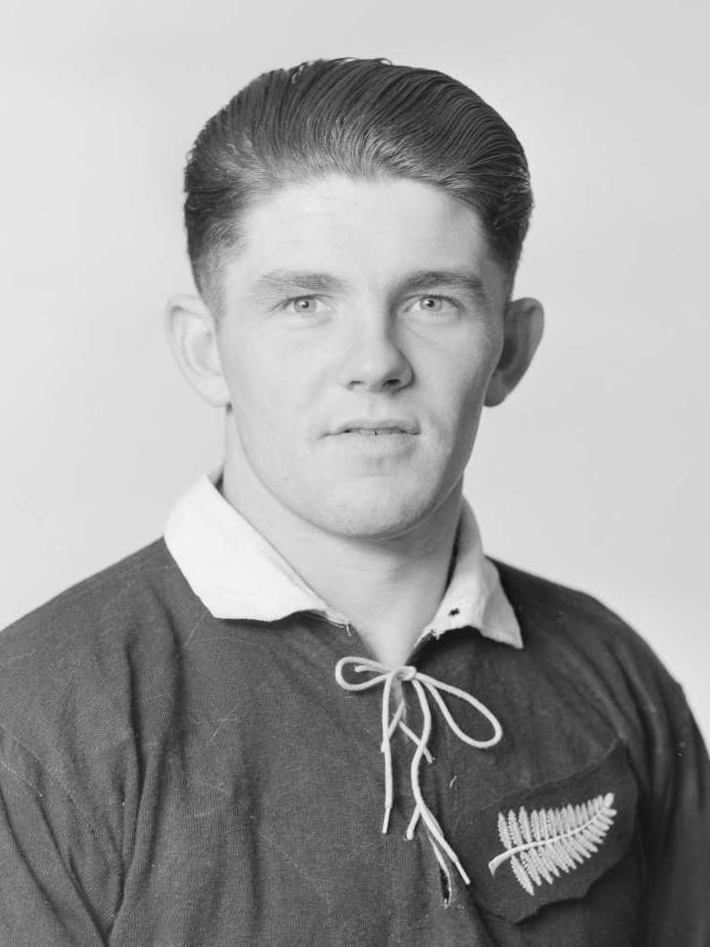
- Dixon in 1953
- Born: Maurice James Dixon; 6 February 1929 Christchurch, New Zealand
- Died: 29 July 2004 (aged 75) Christchurch, New Zealand
- Height: 1.73 m (5 ft 8 in)
- Weight: 73 kg (161 lb)
- School: Christchurch Technical High School
- Occupation: Publican

Rugby union career
- Position: Wing three-quarter
Provincial / State sides
Years	Team	Apps	(Points)
1948, 1951–58	Canterbury	45	
International career
Years	Team	Apps	(Points)
1953–57	New Zealand	10	(6)

Maurice James Dixon (6 February 1929 – 29 July 2004) was a New Zealand rugby union player.

== Playing career ==
A wing three quarter, Dixon represented Canterbury at a provincial level, and was a member of the New Zealand national side, the All Blacks, from 1953 to 1957. He played 28 matches for the All Blacks including ten internationals. He later served as a selector for Canterbury (1963–65, 1968–71) and South Island (1976–80).

== Biography ==
Born in the Christchurch suburb of Sydenham, Dixon was educated at Sydenham Primary School and Christchurch Technical High School. After leaving school, he worked at the Addington Railway Workshops, but became a travelling sales representative for a wine and spirits merchant in 1954. He subsequently was a publican. A stalwart of the Sydenham rugby club, Dixon was the club's delegate to the Canterbury Rugby Union between 1962 and 1967, and served as club president. He married Beryl Andrews in 1950 and they had three children.
