= Peter Jones (rugby union, born 1932) =

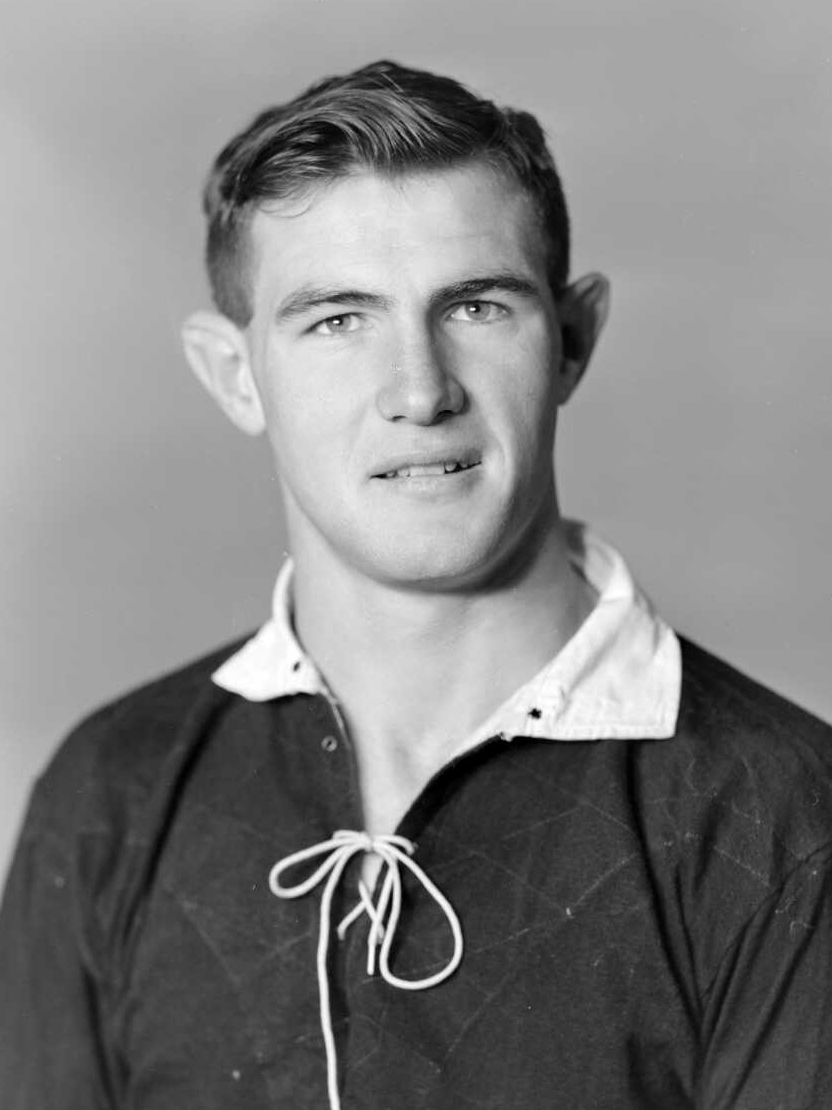
- Jones c. 1951
- Born: Peter Frederick Hilton-Jones; 24 March 1932 Kaitaia, New Zealand
- Died: 7 June 1994 (aged 62) Waipapakauri, New Zealand
- Height: 1.88 m (6 ft 2 in)
- Weight: 108 kg (238 lb)
- School: Kaitaia College
- Occupation: Fisherman

Rugby union career
- Position: No 8 or Flanker
Provincial / State sides
| Years | Team | Apps | (Points) |
| 1950–1961 | North Auckland | 79 | (90) |
International career
| Years | Team | Apps | (Points) |
| 1953–56, 1958–60 | All Blacks | 37 | (60) |

Peter Frederick Hilton Jones (24 March 1932 – 7 June 1994) was a New Zealand International Rugby Union player. He played for the All Blacks in 37 matches (including eleven test matches) between 1953 and 1960. Jones was brought into Ted Griffin's Northland Auckland team in 1950 as an eighteen-year-old and became an immediate sensation. He was part of the North Auckland side under Johnny Smith's captaincy, which beat South Canterbury in Timaru to win the Ranfurly Shield in 1950. By the end of his provincial career, Jones had scored 30 tries in 79 appearances for North Auckland. Of close to Jonah Lomu dimensions, Jones was immensely difficult to stop close to the line, when he went 'super power' and became 'tiger' and simply went straight through the defence. He was worshipped in Northland for his unusual personality and refusal to accept advice to move to the big smoke, Auckland, to advance his career. His immense power was partly due to his demanding job as a fisherman, but he also exercised hard and at 28 and weighing more than 17.5 stone he was still fast.

Jones was listed at 210 pounds (95 kg) and 6 feet 2 inches (1.88 m) when he made his debut in Bob Stuart's 1953–54 All Black side that toured Britain and France. By mid-tour he was weighed at 220 lb (100 kg). He played in the tests against England and Scotland and finished the tour with six tries from 12 appearances. He played all 4 tests against the Springboks in 1956 and the full series against the Wallabies in 1958. He was expected to peak on the South African Tour of 1960 when the All Black with a world class kicker in Don Clarke and awesome fast pack of Whineray(captain) Hemi, Young, Meads, Graham Tremain, Jones had the best chance they would ever have of taking a series in South Africa in the amateur age. Peter Jones form in the build up to the first test was awesome, against Northern Transval, he scored two tries in one of the greatest games every played. Even many Springboks praised him as the greatest forward on earth. After the second try he reacted to sledging of Pretoria crowd, by giving them the bird, a 30 second, two finger V sign that in the words of his biographer, Norman Harris, who shared NZ Herald sports coverage with Terry McLean 'it was obviously not a peace sign'. Like Barry John, taken out 15 minutes into the 1968 Lions v SA first test by Springbok lock, Frik De Preeze or the simultaneous hit on Chris Laidlaw in first test qt Pretoria in 1970, when a hard low tackle by Du Preeze was combined with a simultaneous hard blow, by flanker Abbie Bates (photo in P. Verdon. Tribute. Whitcoulls (2001)) Peter Jones was taken out of the sport in a game against a SA provincial side with a hit to the back by two players, a savage manoeuvre that have previously been attempted in a number of the previous games.

With an impressive physique that averaged about 238 pounds (108 kg) in the second half of his career, Jones was also blessed with the speed of a sprinter. Rugby journalist Terry McLean reported that Jones was capable of running 100 yards (91 m) in 10 seconds. Jones played 37 times for New Zealand and scored 20 tries. He was probably best remembered for his memorable try in the series-ending test against the Springboks in 1956.
