= John Madigan (rugby union) =

Irish rugby union player

- Born: 1 September 1994 (age 32) Charleville, Ireland
- Height: 1.98 m (6 ft 6 in)
- Weight: 119 kg (18.7 st; 262 lb)
- School: CBS Charleville
- University: University College Cork

Rugby union career
- Position: Lock
Amateur team(s)
Years	Team	Apps	(Points)
- Dolphin
Senior career
Years	Team	Apps	(Points)
2015–2017	Munster	3	(0)
2017–2020	Massy	52	(15)
2020–2024	Béziers	90	(10)
2024–	SU Agen	15	(20)
- Correct as of 18 May 2025

John Madigan (born 1 September 1994) is an Irish rugby union player. He plays as a lock for French Rugby Pro D2 side Béziers.

== Munster ==
Madigan made his debut for Munster on 5 September 2015, starting in the opening game of the 2015–16 Pro12 against Treviso. On 19 May 2017, it was announced that Madigan would leave Munster at the end of the 2016–17 season. His father, John Madigan Snr, also played for Munster.

== Career in France ==
Ahead of the 2017–18 season, Madigan joined French Rugby Pro D2 side RC Massy. He joined Béziers ahead of the 2020–21 season.
