= Laurie Haig =

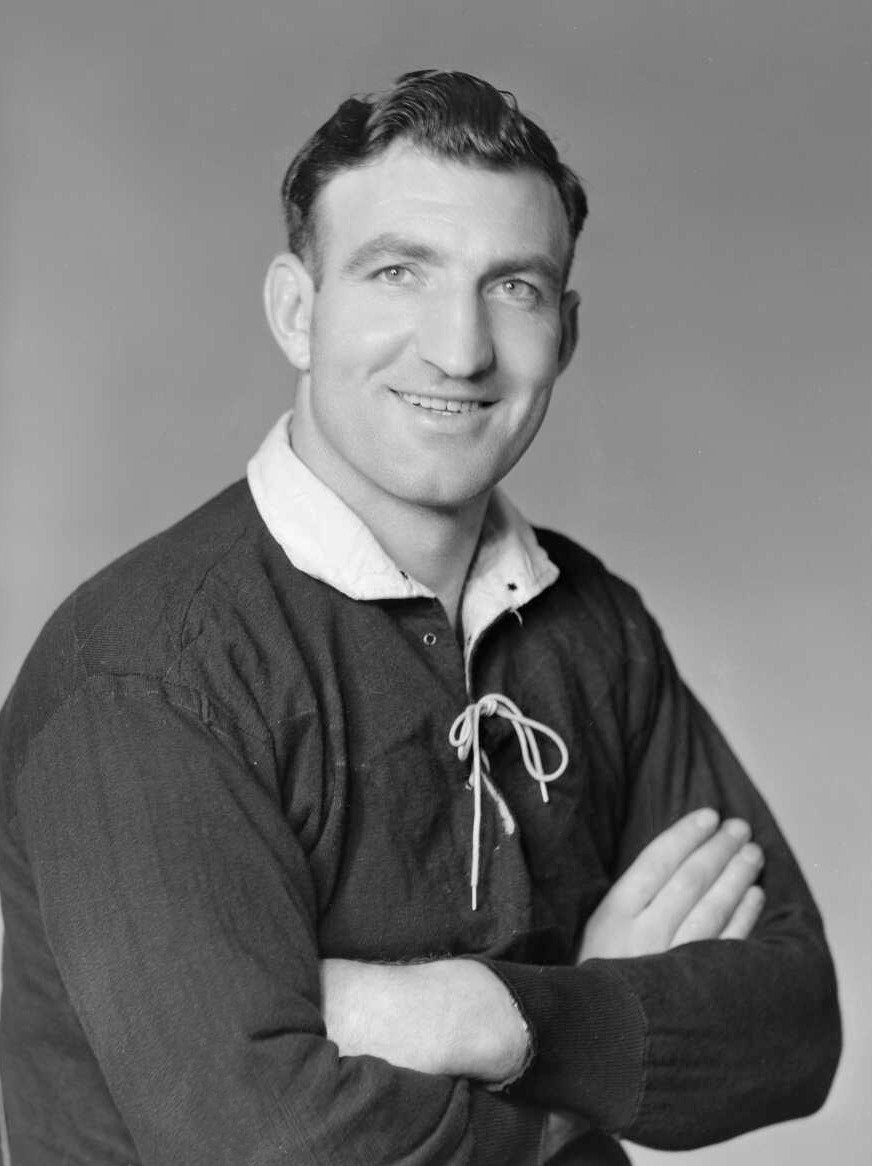
- Haig c. 1951
- Born: Laurence Stokes Haig; 18 October 1922 Prestonpans, East Lothian, Scotland
- Died: 10 July 1992 (aged 69) Dunedin, New Zealand
- Height: 1.78 m (5 ft 10 in)
- Weight: 84 kg (185 lb)
- Notable relative: Jimmy Haig (brother)

Rugby union career
- Position: First five-eighth
Provincial / State sides
Years	Team	Apps	(Points)
1944–53	Otago		
International career
Years	Team	Apps	(Points)
1950–54	New Zealand	9	(5)

Laurence Stokes Haig (18 October 1922 – 10 July 1992) was a New Zealand rugby union player. He was born in Scotland but emigrated to New Zealand with his family when he was two years old. A first five-eighth, Haig represented Otago at a provincial level, and was a member of the New Zealand national side, the All Blacks, between 1950 and 1954. He played 29 matches for the All Blacks including nine internationals, and captained the side on six occasions.

== Rugby career ==
Haig's original position in rugby was at scrum half, or halfback as it is called in New Zealand, but in 1939 he switched to fly half (first five eight) to make way for his younger brother, Jimmy who was also a scrum half also a halfback, into his club XV. For the remainder of his rugby playing career, except for two games at full back he played first five eight. He made his debut for Otago in 1944 and played for a New Zealand XV versus against a Combined Services XV the following year. He did not play for Otago again until 1947 when he played full back in Otago's in the Ranfurly Shield final against Auckland, kicking a conversion and two penalty goals as Otago retained the trophy. He played two trials for the All Blacks in 1948 but was injured for the whole of 1949 before being called to another All Blacks trial in 1950 and being called up to the full New Zealand XV for the three final tests against the British Lions and making his debut for the South Island. In 1851 he played in all three test matches of the All Black's Australian tour but in 1952 Canterbury's John Hotop took his place in the national team. Haig regained his form in 1953 and was restored to the All Blacks XV and was made vice-captain for theirtour in the Northern Hemisphere. This was the first tour where the All Blacks flew to Europe rather than going by ship but even then the flight went from Wellington via Sydney, Darwin, Singapore, Calcutta, Basra (an unscheduled stop due to the aircraft developing mechanical issues), Beirut, Rome, Zürich and eventually London, the trip taking over 5 days. Haig played in 19 of the tour's 36 matches, including three of the five test matches, but there was some criticism as many who felt Guy Bowers, a younger player, should have been selected for some of the bigger matches in Haig's place.

== Family and legacy ==
Haig's brothers Bert and Jimmy also represented Otago, Jimmy also being an All Black playing two matches in 1946 at halfback before switching to rugby league to represent New Zealand in 1947. His brother Bill played cricket for Otago. In 2009 Bert plus Jimmy's son, Barry attended a ceremony where Laurie and Jimmy were finally awarded caps for playing for the All Blacks.
