= John Tanner (rugby union) =

New Zealand rugby union player (1927–2020)

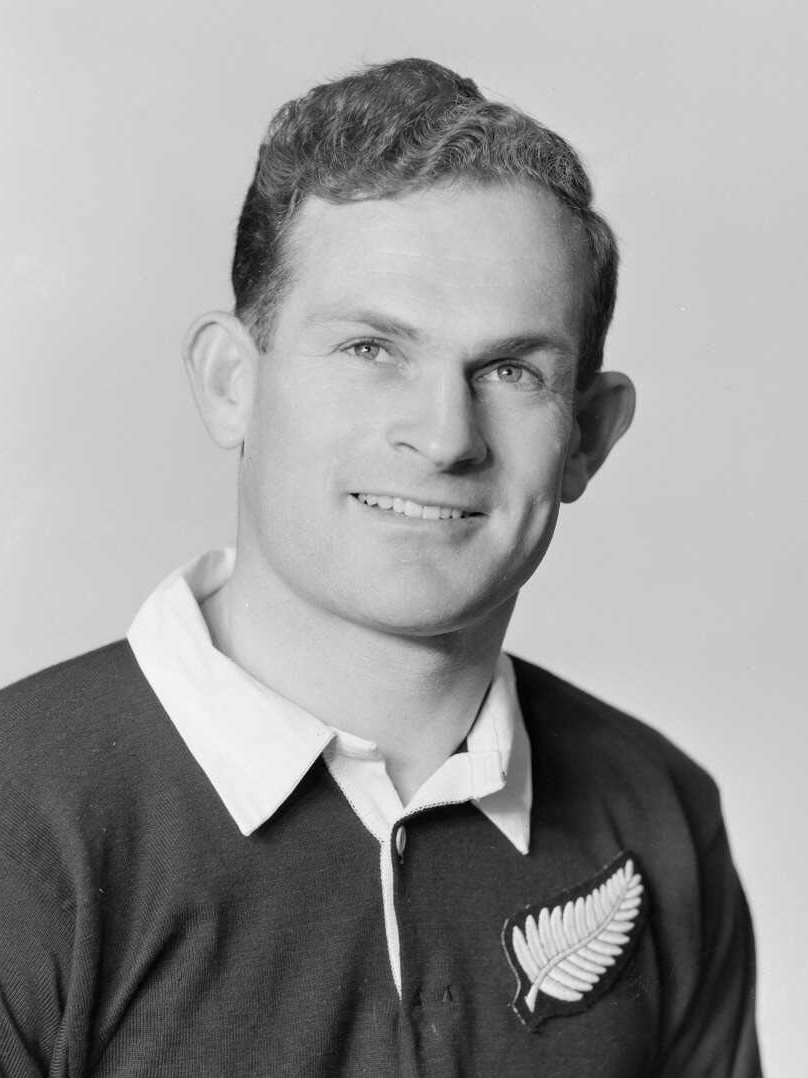
- Tanner in 1953
- Born: John Maurice Tanner; 11 January 1927 Auckland, New Zealand
- Died: 5 October 2020 (aged 93) Auckland, New Zealand
- Height: 1.80 m (5 ft 11 in)
- Weight: 79 kg (174 lb)
- School: Auckland Grammar School
- University: University of Otago
- Occupation: Dental surgeon

Rugby union career
- Position: Second five-eighth and three-quarter
Provincial / State sides
| Years | Team | Apps | (Points) |
- Otago
| - | Auckland | | |
International career
| Years | Team | Apps | (Points) |
| 1950–54 | New Zealand | 5 | (3) |

John Maurice Tanner (11 January 1927 – 5 October 2020) was a New Zealand rugby union player. A second five-eighth and three-quarter, Tanner represented Otago and Auckland at a provincial level, and was a member of the New Zealand national side, the All Blacks, from 1950 to 1954. He played 24 matches for the All Blacks, including five internationals, and captained the team on two occasions.

Tanner died in Auckland on 5 October 2020.
