= Bob Stuart =

Bob Stuart OBE
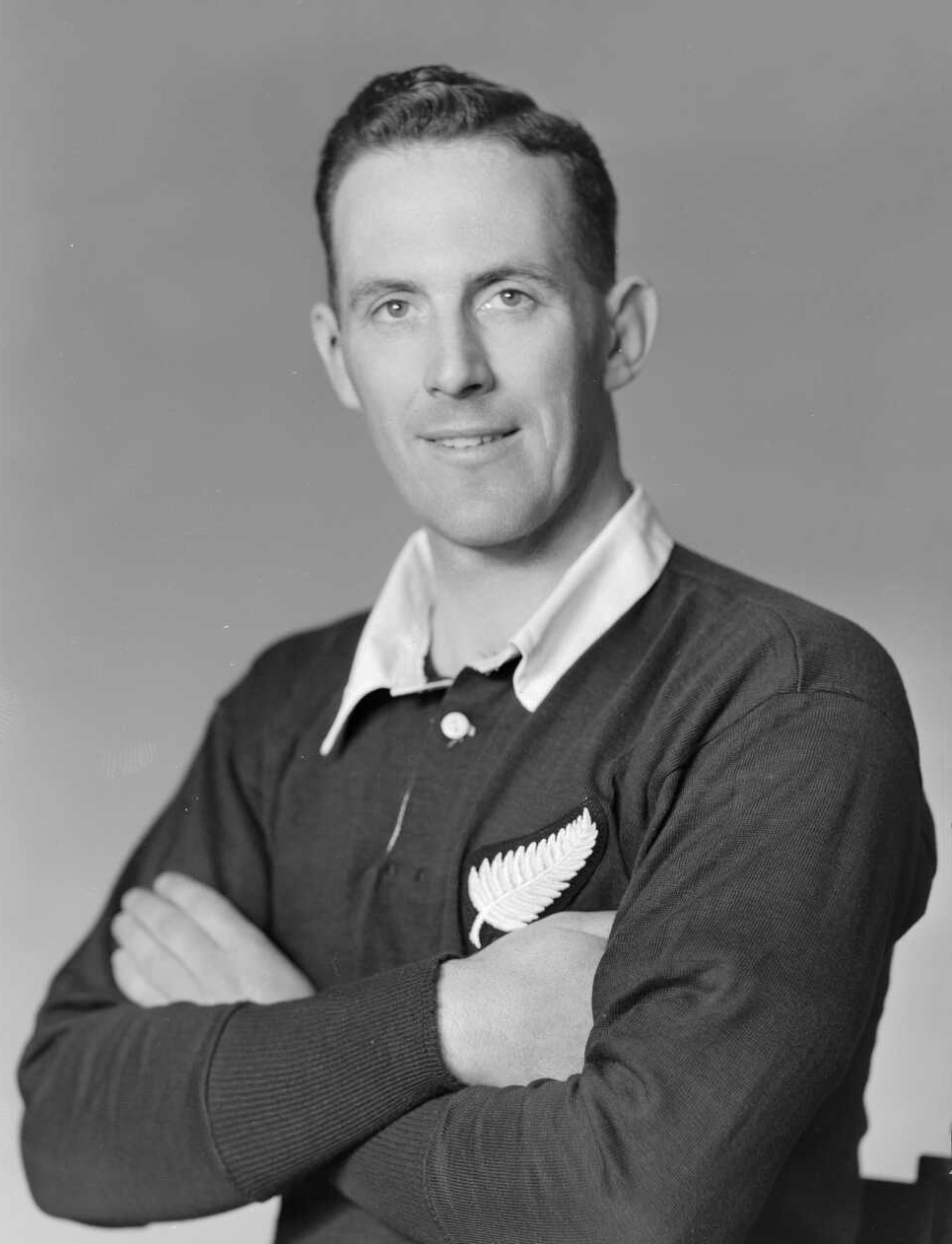
- Stuart in 1951
- Born: Robert Charles Stuart; 28 October 1920 Dunedin, New Zealand
- Died: 10 May 2005 (aged 84) Wellington, New Zealand
- Height: 1.84 m (6 ft 1/2 in)
- Weight: 92 kg (203 lb)
- School: St Kevin's College
- University: Massey Agricultural College
- Notable relative(s): Kevin Stuart (brother); Jim Kearney (cousin); Cameron McIntyre (great-nephew)
- Occupation: Agricultural economist

Rugby union career
- Position: Loose forward
Provincial / State sides
Years	Team	Apps	(Points)
1941	Manawatu	4	
1947–53	Canterbury	71	
International career
Years	Team	Apps	(Points)
- NZ Universities
1949–54	New Zealand	7	(3)

Robert Charles Stuart OBE (28 October 1920 – 11 May 2005) was a New Zealand rugby union player and administrator. He was given a lifetime service award by the International Rugby Board immediately after the 2003 Rugby World Cup.

== Biography ==
Born in Dunedin, Stuart was educated at St Kevin's College, Oamaru and at Massey Agricultural College in Palmerston North, where he honed his rugby skills and became an agricultural economist.

During World War II, Stuart served as a lieutenant in the Fleet Air Arm on patrol on corvettes in the Atlantic.

A loose forward, Stuart briefly represented Manawatu at a provincial level in 1941, and, after the war, Canterbury from 1947 until 1953. He was a member of the New Zealand national side, the All Blacks, from 1949 to 1954, playing in 27 matches, including seven internationals. He captained the All Blacks on their 1953–54 tour of Britain, Ireland, France and North America.

In 1956, Stuart was a coaching advisor for the All Blacks during the South African tour of New Zealand, and between 1958 and 1959 he was one of the two selector–coaches of the Canterbury provincial side. From 1974 to 1989, he was a member of the New Zealand Rugby Union board, and he served as a New Zealand delegate to the International Rugby Board from 1978.

In the 1974 New Year Honours, Stuart was appointed an Officer of the Order of the British Empire, for services to agriculture and sport.

Stuart died in Wellington on 11 May 2005, and was buried at Mākara Cemetery.
