= 2016 Scotland rugby union tour of Japan =

- Coach: Vern Cotter
- Tour captain: Greig Laidlaw
- Top test point scorer: Greig Laidlaw (28)
- Top test try scorer: WP Nel (1)
Summary
P	W	D	L
Total
2	2	0	0
Test match
2	2	0	0
Opponent
P	W	D	L
Japan
2	2	0	0

Tour chronology
- ← Americas & South Africa 2014 Australia, Fiji & Singapore 2017 →

In June 2016, the Scotland rugby union team toured Japan, their first tour of the Eastern Asian country since 1989. Scotland went into the tour on the back of two victories and a fourth-place finish in the 2016 Six Nations Championship while Japan entered the series following an eleventh consecutive Asia Rugby Championship title, and a test match against Canada. With the Brave Blossoms new head coach Jamie Joseph not taking over until August 2016, the Sunwolves head coach Mark Hammett acted as caretaker coach for the two-test series.

== Fixtures ==
Date and time	Venue	Home	Score	Away
18 June 2016, 19:20 JST (UTC+09)	Toyota Stadium, Toyota, Aichi	Japan	13–26	Scotland
25 June 2016, 19:20 JST (UTC+09)	Ajinomoto Stadium, Chōfu, Tokyo	Japan	16–21	Scotland

== Squads ==
Note: Ages, caps and clubs are as per 18 June, the first test match of the tour.

=== Japan ===
On 30 May, caretaker coach Mark Hammett named a 33-man squad for Japan's June tests against Canada and Scotland.

On 1 June, Kyosuke Horie and Shokei Kin were added to the squad for the Canadian test on 11 June.

Coaching team:

- Head coach: (New Zealand) Mark Hammett (Caretaker)
- Backs coach: (Japan) Atsushi Tanabe
- Forwards coach: (New Zealand) Filo Tiatia
- Defence coach: (New Zealand) Nathan Mauger

Player	Position	Date of birth (age)	Caps	Club/province
Shota Horie	Hooker	21 January 1986 (aged 30)	42	(Japan) Sunwolves
Takeshi Kizu	Hooker	15 July 1988 (aged 27)	42	(Japan) Sunwolves
Futoshi Mori	Hooker	25 April 1988 (aged 28)	2	(Japan) Sunwolves
Kensuke Hatakeyama	Prop	2 August 1985 (aged 30)	73	(England) Newcastle Falcons
Keita Inagaki	Prop	2 June 1990 (aged 26)	11	(Japan) Sunwolves
Shinnosuke Kakinaga	Prop	19 December 1991 (aged 24)	6	(Japan) Sunwolves
Masataka Mikami	Prop	4 June 1988 (aged 28)	32	(Japan) Sunwolves
Naohiro Kotaki	Lock	13 June 1992 (aged 24)	5	(Japan) Toshiba Brave Lupus
Hitoshi Ono	Lock	6 May 1978 (aged 38)	96	(Japan) Sunwolves
Kazuhiko Usami	Lock	17 March 1992 (aged 24)	9	(Japan) Sunwolves
Kotaro Yatabe	Lock	29 July 1986 (aged 29)	5	(Japan) Panasonic Wild Knights
Taiyo Ando	Flanker	22 August 1987 (aged 28)	2	(Japan) Sunwolves
Kyosuke Horie	Flanker	11 July 1990 (aged 25)	3	(Japan) Yamaha Júbilo
Yoshiya Hosoda	Flanker	5 August 1987 (aged 28)	1	(Japan) Sunwolves
Shokei Kin	Flanker	3 October 1991 (aged 24)	4	(Japan) NTT Communications Shining Arcs
Hendrik Tui	Flanker	13 December 1987 (aged 28)	36	(Australia) Queensland Reds
Hiroki Yamamoto	Flanker	17 November 1992 (aged 23)	4	(Japan) Toshiba Brave Lupus
Koliniasi Holani	Number 8	25 October 1981 (aged 34)	44	(Japan) Panasonic Wild Knights
Amanaki Mafi	Number 8	11 January 1990 (aged 26)	7	(England) Bath
Kaito Shigeno	Scrum-half	21 November 1990 (aged 25)	1	(Japan) Sunwolves
Fumiaki Tanaka	Scrum-half	3 January 1985 (aged 31)	54	(New Zealand) Highlanders
Keisuke Uchida	Scrum-half	22 February 1992 (aged 24)	16	(Japan) Sunwolves
Kosei Ono	Fly-half	17 April 1987 (aged 29)	33	(Japan) Suntory Sungoliath
Harumichi Tatekawa	Fly-half	2 December 1989 (aged 26)	44	(Japan) Sunwolves
Tim Bennetts	Centre	1 August 1990 (aged 25)	3	(Japan) Canon Eagles
Ryoto Nakamura	Centre	3 June 1991 (aged 25)	8	(Japan) Suntory Sungoliath
Mifiposeti Paea	Centre	6 July 1987 (aged 28)	1	(Japan) Sunwolves
Male Sa'u	Centre	13 October 1987 (aged 28)	26	(New Zealand) Blues
Yu Tamura	Centre	9 January 1989 (aged 27)	36	(Japan) Sunwolves
Karne Hesketh	Wing	1 August 1985 (aged 30)	14	(Japan) Munakata Sanix Blues
Kentaro Kodama	Wing	28 January 1992 (aged 24)	4	(Japan) Panasonic Wild Knights
Kotaro Matsushima	Wing	26 February 1993 (aged 23)	17	(Australia) Melbourne Rebels
Yasutaka Sasakura	Wing	4 August 1988 (aged 27)	1	(Japan) Sunwolves
Rikiya Matsuda	Fullback	3 May 1994 (aged 22)	1	(Japan) Tokai University
Ryuji Noguchi	Fullback	15 July 1995 (aged 20)	4	(Japan) Tokai University

=== Scotland ===
On 9 May 2016, Vern Cotter named a 27-man squad for Scotland's June two-test series against Japan.

On 16 May, Matt Scott was called up to the squad to replace the injured Alex Dunbar.

On 19 May, Sean Lamont was called up to the squad to replace the injured Tim Visser.

On 27 May, uncapped Huw Jones was called up to the squad to replace the injured Finn Russell.

On 19 June, Gordon Reid was called up to the squad to replace the injured Alasdair Dickinson.

Coaching team:

- Head coach: (New Zealand) Vern Cotter
- Defence coach: (Australia) Matt Taylor
- Attack/Backs coach: (New Zealand) Jason O'Halloran
- Forwards coach: (Wales) Jonathan Humphreys

Player	Position	Date of birth (age)	Caps	Club/province
Fraser Brown	Hooker	20 June 1989 (aged 26)	15	(Scotland) Glasgow Warriors
Ross Ford	Hooker	23 April 1984 (aged 32)	99	(Scotland) Edinburgh
Stuart McInally	Hooker	9 August 1990 (aged 25)	7	(Scotland) Edinburgh
Alasdair Dickinson	Prop	11 September 1983 (aged 32)	57	(Scotland) Edinburgh
Moray Low	Prop	28 November 1984 (aged 31)	32	(England) Exeter Chiefs
WP Nel	Prop	30 April 1986 (aged 30)	13	(Scotland) Edinburgh
Gordon Reid	Prop	4 March 1987 (aged 29)	17	(Scotland) Glasgow Warriors
Rory Sutherland	Prop	24 August 1992 (aged 23)	1	(Scotland) Edinburgh
Jonny Gray	Lock	14 March 1994 (aged 22)	23	(Scotland) Glasgow Warriors
Richie Gray	Lock	24 August 1989 (aged 26)	56	(France) Castres
Tim Swinson	Lock	17 February 1987 (aged 29)	22	(Scotland) Glasgow Warriors
John Barclay	Flanker	24 September 1986 (aged 29)	50	(Wales) Scarlets
John Hardie	Flanker	27 July 1988 (aged 27)	10	(Scotland) Edinburgh
Josh Strauss	Flanker	23 October 1986 (aged 29)	8	(Scotland) Glasgow Warriors
David Denton	Number 8	5 February 1990 (aged 26)	34	(England) Bath
Ryan Wilson	Number 8	18 May 1989 (aged 27)	18	(Scotland) Glasgow Warriors
Greig Laidlaw	Scrum-half	12 October 1985 (aged 30)	51	(England) Gloucester
Henry Pyrgos	Scrum-half	9 July 1989 (aged 26)	17	(Scotland) Glasgow Warriors
Finn Russell	Fly-half	23 September 1992 (aged 23)	19	(Scotland) Glasgow Warriors
Ruaridh Jackson	Fly-half	12 September 1988 (aged 27)	28	(England) Wasps
Alex Dunbar	Centre	23 April 1990 (aged 26)	16	(Scotland) Glasgow Warriors
Peter Horne	Centre	5 October 1989 (aged 26)	18	(Scotland) Glasgow Warriors
Huw Jones	Centre	17 December 1993 (aged 22)	0	(South Africa) Stormers
Matt Scott	Centre	30 September 1990 (aged 25)	34	(Scotland) Edinburgh
Duncan Taylor	Centre	5 September 1989 (aged 26)	17	(England) Saracens
Damien Hoyland	Wing	11 January 1994 (aged 22)	1	(Scotland) Edinburgh
Sean Lamont	Wing	15 January 1981 (aged 35)	104	(Scotland) Glasgow Warriors
Sean Maitland	Wing	14 September 1988 (aged 27)	21	(England) London Irish
Tommy Seymour	Wing	1 July 1988 (aged 27)	27	(Scotland) Glasgow Warriors
Tim Visser	Wing	29 May 1987 (aged 29)	26	(England) Harlequins
Stuart Hogg	Fullback	24 June 1992 (aged 23)	43	(Scotland) Glasgow Warriors

== Matches ==
=== First test ===
18 June 2016
19:20 JST (UTC+09)

Japan	13–26	Scotland
Try: Horie 8' c Con: Tamura (1/1) 9'; Pen: Tamura (2/3) 28', 55'	Report	Try: Penalty try 37' c Nel 41' c Con: Laidlaw (2/2) 38', 43'; Pen: Laidlaw (4/4) 4', 15', 19', 62'

Toyota Stadium, Toyota, Aichi
Attendance: 24,113
Referee: Ben O'Keeffe (New Zealand)

FB	15	Kotaro Matsushima		(substituted off) 15'
RW	14	Mifiposeti Paea
OC	13	Tim Bennetts
IC	12	Harumichi Tatekawa
LW	11	Yasutaka Sasakura
FH	10	Yu Tamura
SH	9	Kaito Shigeno		(substituted off) 48'
N8	8	Amanaki Mafi
OF	7	Shokei Kin
BF	6	Hendrik Tui	(yellow card) 34' to 44'	(substituted off) 78'
RL	5	Naohiro Kotaki
LL	4	Hitoshi Ono
TP	3	Kensuke Hatakeyama		(substituted off) 51'
HK	2	Shota Horie (c)
LP	1	Keita Inagaki
Replacements:
HK	16	Takeshi Kizu
PR	17	Masataka Mikami
PR	18	Shinnosuke Kakinaga		(substituted on) 51'
LK	19	Kotaro Yatabe
FL	20	Hiroki Yamamoto		(substituted on) 78'
SH	21	Keisuke Uchida		(substituted on) 48'
FH	22	Kosei Ono
FB	23	Rikiya Matsuda	(yellow card) 37' to 47'	(substituted on) 15'
Coach:
(New Zealand) Mark Hammett

FB	15	Stuart Hogg
RW	14	Tommy Seymour
OC	13	Duncan Taylor	(substituted off) 66'
IC	12	Matt Scott
LW	11	Damien Hoyland	(substituted off) 56'
FH	10	Ruaridh Jackson
SH	9	Greig Laidlaw (c)
N8	8	Ryan Wilson	(substituted off) 64'
OF	7	John Hardie
BF	6	John Barclay
RL	5	Jonny Gray
LL	4	Richie Gray	(substituted off) 66'
TP	3	WP Nel	(substituted off) 64'
HK	2	Stuart McInally	(substituted off) 47'
LP	1	Alasdair Dickinson	(substituted off) 3'
Replacements:
HK	16	Fraser Brown	(substituted on) 47'
PR	17	Rory Sutherland	(substituted on) 3'
PR	18	Moray Low	(substituted on) 64'
LK	19	Tim Swinson	(substituted on) 66'
N8	20	David Denton	(substituted on) 64'
SH	21	Henry Pyrgos
CE	22	Peter Horne	(substituted on) 66'
WG	23	Sean Maitland	(substituted on) 56'
Coach:
(New Zealand) Vern Cotter

Touch judges:
Marius Mitrea (Italy)
Brendan Pickerill (New Zealand)
Television match official:
Ian Smith (Australia)

=== Second test ===
25 June 2016
19:20 JST (UTC+09)

Japan	16–21	Scotland
Try: Shigeno 20' c Con: Tamura (1/1) 21'; Pen: Tamura (3/3) 6', 29', 49'	Report	Pen: Pyrgos (3/4) 2', 15', 25'; Laidlaw (4/4) 52', 60', 70', 77'

Ajinomoto Stadium, Chōfu, Tokyo
Attendance: 34,073
Referee: Marius Mitrea (Italy)

FB	15	Rikiya Matsuda	(substituted off) 77'
RW	14	Male Sa'u
OC	13	Tim Bennetts	(substituted off) 55'
IC	12	Harumichi Tatekawa
LW	11	Yasutaka Sasakura
FH	10	Yu Tamura
SH	9	Kaito Shigeno	(substituted off) 61'
N8	8	Amanaki Mafi
OF	7	Shokei Kin
BF	6	Hendrik Tui	(substituted off) 60'
RL	5	Naohiro Kotaki
LL	4	Hitoshi Ono	(substituted off) 65'
TP	3	Kensuke Hatakeyama	(substituted off) 55'
HK	2	Shota Horie (c)	(substituted off) 60'
LP	1	Keita Inagaki	(substituted off) 71'
Replacements:
HK	16	Takeshi Kizu	(substituted on) 60'
PR	17	Masataka Mikami	(substituted on) 71'
PR	18	Shinnosuke Kakinaga	(substituted on) 55'
LK	19	Kotaro Yatabe	(substituted on) 65'
N8	20	Koliniasi Holani	(substituted on) 60'
SH	21	Keisuke Uchida	(substituted on) 61'
FH	22	Kosei Ono	(substituted on) 55'
CE	23	Mifiposeti Paea	(substituted on) 77'
Coach:
(New Zealand) Mark Hammett

FB	15	Stuart Hogg
RW	14	Tommy Seymour
OC	13	Matt Scott
IC	12	Peter Horne
LW	11	Sean Maitland	(substituted off) 79'
FH	10	Ruaridh Jackson	(substituted off) 57'
SH	9	Henry Pyrgos (c)	(substituted off) 49'
N8	8	Ryan Wilson	(substituted off) 44'
OF	7	John Barclay	(substituted off) 67'
BF	6	Josh Strauss
RL	5	Jonny Gray
LL	4	Richie Gray
TP	3	Moray Low	(substituted off) 40'
HK	2	Stuart McInally	(substituted off) 40'
LP	1	Rory Sutherland	(substituted off) 40'
Replacements:
HK	16	Fraser Brown	(substituted on) 40'
PR	17	Gordon Reid	(substituted on) 40'
PR	18	WP Nel	(substituted on) 40'
LK	19	Tim Swinson	(substituted on) 67'
FL	20	John Hardie	(substituted on) 44'
SH	21	Greig Laidlaw	(substituted on) 49'
CE	22	Huw Jones	(substituted on) 57'
WG	23	Sean Lamont	(substituted on) 79'
Coach:
(New Zealand) Vern Cotter

Touch judges:
Ben O'Keeffe (New Zealand)
Brendan Pickerill (New Zealand)
Television match official:
Ian Smith (Australia)

Notes:

- Huw Jones (Scotland) made his international debut.
- The 31,392 crowd was a record home crowd for a Japanese rugby international.

== Japan warm-up match ==
On 11 June, Japan played away to Canada in the lead up to the Scottish series.

11 June 2016
15:00 PDT (UTC-07)

Canada	22–26	Japan
Try: Paris 6' m Barkwill 20' c Cudmore 45' m Carpenter 79' m Con: McRorie (1/4) 21'	Report	Try: Kizu 34' c Matsushima 69' c Con: Tamura (2/2) 35', 70'; Pen: Tamura (4/4) 11', 40', 51', 76'

BC Place, Vancouver
Attendance: 10,250
Referee: Federico Anselmi (Argentina)

Team details

FB	15	Matt Evans
RW	14	Dan Moor
OC	13	Brock Staller
IC	12	Nick Blevins
LW	11	Taylor Paris		(substituted off) 71'
FH	10	Pat Parfrey		(substituted off) 55'
SH	9	Gordon McRorie
N8	8	Aaron Carpenter	(yellow card) 51' to 61'
OF	7	Lucas Rumball		(substituted off) 55'
BF	6	Kyle Baillie		(substituted off) 66'
RL	5	Evan Olmstead
LL	4	Jamie Cudmore (c)		(substituted off) 55'
TP	3	Jake Ilnicki		(substituted off) 72'
HK	2	Ray Barkwill		(substituted off) 67'
LP	1	Djustice Sears-Duru
Replacements:
HK	16	Eric Howard		(substituted on) 67'
PR	17	Tom Dolezel		(substituted on) 72'
PR	18	Matt Tierney
LK	19	Paul Ciulini		(substituted on) 55'
FL	20	Matt Heaton		(substituted on) 55'
FL	21	Alistair Clark		(substituted on) 66'
SH	22	Jamie Mackenzie		(substituted on) 55'
CE	23	Mozac Samson		(substituted on) 71'
Coach:
(New Zealand) Mark Anscombe

FB	15	Kotaro Matsushima
RW	14	Mifiposeti Paea
OC	13	Tim Bennetts		(substituted off) 63'
IC	12	Harumichi Tatekawa (c)
LW	11	Yasutaka Sasakura		(substituted off) 76'
FH	10	Yu Tamura
SH	9	Fumiaki Tanaka		(substituted off) 40'
N8	8	Kyosuke Horie
OF	7	Taiyo Ando		(substituted off) 40'
BF	6	Yoshiya Hosoda	(red card) 54'
RL	5	Naohiro Kotaki
LL	4	Kazuhiko Usami		(substituted off) 72'
TP	3	Kensuke Hatakeyama		(substituted off) 49'
HK	2	Takeshi Kizu
LP	1	Keita Inagaki
Replacements:
HK	16	Futoshi Mori
PR	17	Masataka Mikami
PR	18	Shinnosuke Kakinaga		(substituted on) 49'
LK	19	Kotaro Yatabe		(substituted on) 72'
FL	20	Shokei Kin		(substituted on) 40'
SH	21	Kaito Shigeno		(substituted on) 40'
FH	22	Kosei Ono		(substituted on) 63'
FB	23	Rikiya Matsuda		(substituted on) 76'
Coach:
(New Zealand) Mark Hammett

Man of the Match:
Djustice Sears-Duru (Canada)

Touch judges:
Kurt Weaver (United States)
Derek Summers (United States)
Television match official:
David Smortchevsky (Canada)

Notes:

- Matt Heaton (Canada) and Yoshiya Hosoda, Rikiya Matsuda, Mifiposeti Paea, Yasutaka Sasakura and Kaito Shigeno (all Japan) made their international debuts.

== Statistics ==
Key

- Con: Conversions
- Pen: Penalties
- DG: Drop goals
- Pts: Points

=== Scotland Statistics ===
Name	Played	Tries	Con	Pen	DG	Pts	Temporarily suspended	Sent off (straight red)
Greig Laidlaw	2	0	2	8	0	28	–	–
Henry Pyrgos	1	0	3	0	0	9	–	–
WP Nel	2	1	0	0	0	5	–	–
John Barclay	2	0	0	0	0	0	–	–
Fraser Brown	2	0	0	0	0	0	–	–
Jonny Gray	2	0	0	0	0	0	–	–
Richie Gray	2	0	0	0	0	0	–	–
John Hardie	2	0	0	0	0	0	–	–
Stuart Hogg	2	0	0	0	0	0	–	–
Peter Horne	2	0	0	0	0	0	–	–
Ruaridh Jackson	2	0	0	0	0	0	–	–
Moray Low	2	0	0	0	0	0	–	–
Sean Maitland	2	0	0	0	0	0	–	–
Stuart McInally	2	0	0	0	0	0	–	–
Matt Scott	2	0	0	0	0	0	–	–
Tommy Seymour	2	0	0	0	0	0	–	–
Rory Sutherland	2	0	0	0	0	0	–	–
Tim Swinson	2	0	0	0	0	0	–	–
Ryan Wilson	2	0	0	0	0	0	–	–
David Denton	1	0	0	0	0	0	–	–
Alasdair Dickinson	1	0	0	0	0	0	–	–
Huw Jones	1	0	0	0	0	0	–	–
Damien Hoyland	1	0	0	0	0	0	–	–
Sean Lamont	1	0	0	0	0	0	–	–
Gordon Reid	1	0	0	0	0	0	–	–
Josh Strauss	1	0	0	0	0	0	–	–
Duncan Taylor	1	0	0	0	0	0	–	–
Alex Dunbar	–	–	–	–	–	0	–	–
Ross Ford	–	–	–	–	–	0	–	–
Finn Russell	–	–	–	–	–	0	–	–
Tim Visser	–	–	–	–	–	0	–	–

=== Tour statistics ===
Name	Team	Tries	Con	Pen	DG	Pts
Greig Laidlaw	Scotland	0	2	8	0	28
Yu Tamura	Japan	0	2	5	0	19
Henry Pyrgos	Scotland	0	0	3	0	9
Shota Horie	Japan	1	0	0	0	5
WP Nel	Scotland	1	0	0	0	5
Kaito Shigeno	Japan	1	0	0	0	5

== See also ==
- 2016 mid-year rugby union internationals
- Mid-year rugby union tests
