= Manawatu Rugby Union =

NZ rugby union club, based in Palmerston North

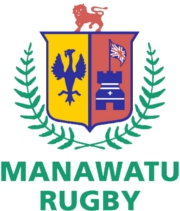
- Sport: Rugby union
- Jurisdiction: Manawatū-Whanganui
- Abbreviation: MRU
- Founded: 1886; 140 years ago
- Affiliation: New Zealand Rugby
- Headquarters: Palmerston North
- President: Bruce Hemara
- Chairman: Tyn Myers
- Director: Barry Roche

Official website
- www.manawaturugby.co.nz
- (New Zealand)

The Manawatu Rugby Football Union (MRU) serves as the governing body of the sport of rugby union in the Manawatū-Whanganui region of New Zealand.

Founded in 1886, Manawatu is one of New Zealand's oldest rugby unions. In 1892, the MRU, amongst other unions, played a pivotal role in establishing the New Zealand Rugby Union (NZRU). During 1997–1998, Manawatu entered into an amalgamation with Hawke's Bay, as the "Central Vikings", wearing orange and blue attire.

The union is based in the city of Palmerston North though its catchment area includes players and clubs from nearby towns in the province, including Ashhurst, Feilding, Rongotea, Linton, Bulls, Pahiatua, Woodville and Dannevirke. It has over 5,000 players, making it the tenth largest union in New Zealand in terms of player numbers. In 2011, the union celebrated its 125th jubilee.

Manawatu have traditionally played in a distinctive green and white tramline jersey, which is thought to have been established in 1909. In 1996, a jersey including red was worn, and colours worn have varied since the union was formed.

The union's home ground is Central Energy Trust Arena.

== History ==
The Manawatu rugby union was formed on 17 April 1886 at Palmerston North, with the founding clubs being: Palmerston, Feilding and Foxton. It was initially named the Manawatu County Union but was renamed in 1888. The sport had been introduced to the area by a few players from Wanganui, who had moved into the region. Following the unions establishment many other clubs were formed as the sport became more popular.

Early years

The first recorded match in the Manawatu took place on 13 July 1878. A Feilding side faced a "Rangitikei Combined Clubs XV" which was played at Feilding.

The first Ranfurly Shield game Manawatu appeared in was in 1914. This was played against Taranaki at Pukekura Park. The match was lost 11–3 with William Carroll scoring a sole try. Their next challenge came ten years later, in 1924, where they would lose 31–5 to Hawke's Bay. Manawatu also provided J.F. Manning to referee a match in 1905 between Auckland and Wellington.

1970s and early 1980s: First division era and Ranfurly shield reign

The period from 1976 to 1983 saw Manawatu as one of the leading New Zealand rugby provinces. In this period Manawatu consistently beat teams such as Otago, Auckland, Wellington and Canterbury. Manawatu held the Ranfurly Shield from 1976 to 1978 and this was followed by victory in the 1980 First Division Championship. Manawatu were also runner-up in 1976 and 1981. A large sign reading "Go! Go! Manawatu!" was lifted above Palmerston North Showgrounds Oval by crane.

Manawatu beat Auckland 12–10 at Eden Park in 1976 to win the Log 'o Wood, as the Ranfurly Shield is sometimes referred to, for the first time. Doug Rollerson's dropped goal secured the famous victory for Manawatu. This led to a homecoming parade through the city streets.

With prop Kent Lambert sent-off, Manawatu were reduced to 14-men in their defence of the Ranfurly Shield against the Counties side in 1977. However, Manawatu rallied to record a victory 15–10. A last minute try prevented the Counties side from taking the Shield back to Pukekohe for the first time.

There was some controversy in 1977 when the Auckland rugby union had a request for a shield challenge that season denied by Manawatu who argued that Auckland had had 'too much influence in shield rugby for too long'.

In the final Ranfurly Shield challenge of the 1978 season Manawatu were leading North Auckland (now named Northland) 10–9 with time up on the clock. However, the referee, Bill Adlam, from Wanganui, played 5–6 minutes of 'injury' time before awarding the visitors a penalty, due to an offside, close to the posts. A penalty kick was successful and the shield was won by North Auckland. The referee then required a police escort off Showgrounds Oval (as it was known) while Manawatu fans showed their disgust and disappointment. Adlam claimed after the match that the game clock at the venue had not allocated for a couple of "lengthy" injury breaks, and so he rightly let the game go on. This was also backed up by a photographer who accurately timed the game.

Manawatu scored a 20–10 win over Australia in 1978.

In 1979 Auckland had won back the Ranfurly shield and denied Manawatu a challenge in 1980.

In 1980, during its championship winning season, Manawatu had eight All Blacks within the team: Mark Donaldson, Mark Shaw, Geoff Old, Frank Oliver, Gary Knight, Doug Rollerson, Lachie Cameron and Craig Wickes.

One of Manawatu's most memorable matches was the 1981 encounter against South Africa. Manawatu led 9–4 at halftime and with minutes to go the score was 19–19. The clash between the national champions and the 'test' strength Springboks was headed for a climax worthy of such an event. In the final analysis, Naas Botha was the difference between the two sides. In the final minutes he scored a long range penalty, a dropped goal and a sideline conversion to lead the 'Boks home to a flattering 31–19 victory. The Manawatu verses Springbok game was the first to witness the Police riot squads patrolling the streets as a pre-emptive measure, as opposed to them just turning up once trouble started. The day was generally incident free.

In 1983 the Canterbury Ranfurly Shield team put Manawatu last on their list of challengers for that season.

In 1985, Manawatu celebrated a centenary for its club competition and in 1986, the union's centenary.

Late 1980s to mid 2000s - second division

In 1988, the union was relegated to the second division for the first time. Manawatu, based in the second division, was reduced to a 'feeder' role, losing players to other unions.

Lee Stensness starred in a 58–24 win over Ireland in 1992.

In 1996 Manawatu and Hawke's Bay merged their teams to form the Central Vikings Rugby Union. It was an attempt to elevate both unions back to the first division. Players such as Mark Allen, Christian Cullen, Mark Ranby, Stephen Bachop and Roger Randle featured in the team. The 1997 season saw them finish second overall with 6 wins and 2 losses. This saw the team into the semi-finals. In the semi-final, the Vikings would go on to beat Bay of Plenty and came up against Northland in the final. Northland won the final 63–10. Northland were thus promoted to the first division. However, had the Vikings won, they would not have been eligible to be promoted.

1998 saw a repeat of form for the Vikings who went unbeaten in the season. They subsequently won the final against Bay of Plenty and were promoted to first division. However, due to financial issues, the merger split back to Manawatu and Hawke's Bay as separate unions. Manawatu returned in 1999 to the second division.

Manawatu began the new millennium firmly fixed in the second-tier competition.

In 2005, Manawatu were heavily defeated 6–109 by the touring British and Irish Lions at Palmerston North.

2006 onwards - return to the first division

In 2005, Manawatu were invited along with four other unions, reduced to three after an amalgamation of Nelson Bays and Marlborough into Tasman, to play in the first division of a restructured National Provincial Championship, initially called (for sponsorship purposes) the Air New Zealand Cup. It was the first time since 1988 Manawatu had fielded a team in the top grade and unlike the 1980s it was now a professional rugby competition.

In 2009, Central Energy Trust Arena was the venue for a Highlanders home game against the Bulls from South Africa.

Fly-half Aaron Cruden was selected for the All Blacks in 2010. He was the first All Black chosen whilst playing for the union since Christian Cullen in 1996.

Manawatu hosted two matches during the 2011 Rugby World Cup.

In 2011, a resurgent Manawatu Turbos side defeated the Wellington Lions 31–25 in Wellington. It was Manawatu's first competition win over Wellington in the capital, after 124 years of trying. Also in 2011, Manawatu scored 54 points against Waikato team at Arena Manawatu. The Turbos led 35–17 at halftime, eventually winning 54–20. This kept the Turbos unbeaten at home for the season.

In 2012, Manawatu scored its first victory away to North Harbor. The win at home against Hawke's Bay made Manawatu one of the few Championship teams to beat a Premiership team.

In 2012, Aaron Smith was selected in the All Blacks after fine performances with Manawatu and the Highlanders. Smith joining Aaron Cruden meant for the first time since 1986, two All Blacks came from Manawatu.

In 2021 Manawatu appointed Andrea Jackson as Chief Executive Officer. Manawatu were the first top-flight union to appoint a woman in that role.

== Club rugby ==
The Manawatu rugby union includes the following clubs:

Club name	Team Colours	Home base	Notes
Ashhurst-Pohangina	Green and Gold	Ashhurst	
Bulls	Black	Bulls	
Bunnythorpe	Maroon, Gold and Black	Bunnythorpe	
Bush Sports	Red and Blue	Pahiatua	Junior level rugby only is played in Manawatu; Senior level has returned to Wairarapa-Bush Rugby Union.
College Old Boys (COB)	White, Maroon, Gold & Black	Palmerston North	
Dannevirke	Black and Gold	Dannevirke	Dannevirke Sports Club was formerly affiliated with Hawke's Bay, however in 2007, it switched its affiliation to Manawatu.
Feilding (Feilding Yellows)	Yellow & Black	Feilding	
Feilding Old Boys-Oroua RFC (FOB-O)	Black, White, Red & Blue	Feilding and Kimbolton	Feilding Old Boys-Oroua is an amalgamation of the Feilding Old Boys and Oroua Rugby Clubs
Freyberg (Freys)	Royal Blue & Gold	Milson, Palmerston North	
Halcombe	Black and Red	Halcombe	
High School Old Boys-Marist (OBM)	Black, White & Green hoops	Palmerston North	High School Old Boys-Marist was an amalgamation of the High School Old Boys (HSOB) and Marist Rugby Clubs
Kia Toa	Light Blue & Dark Blue	Awapuni/Highbury, Palmerston North	
Linton Army	Red & Black	Linton Military Camp	
Varsity	Sky Blue	Massey University, Palmerston North	
Te Kawau	Emerald Green & Black	Rongotea	

=== Hankins Shield Senior A Club competition winners ===
- 1987 Varsity (coached by Murray Kendrick)
- 1988 Varsity (Murray Kendrick)
- 1989 HSOB (Ian Colquhoun)
- 1990 College OB (Bill Clarke)
- 1991 College OB (Bill Clarke)
- 1992 Marist (Frank Oliver)
- 1993 Kia Toa (Warren Hayne)
- 1994 Feilding OB (Roger Walker)
- 1995 Marist (John Fisher)
- 1996 Oroua (Wayne Harding)
- 1997 Te Kawau (Geoff Webb)
- 1998 Marist (Mark Gleeson)
- 1999 Te Kawau (Geoff Webb)
- 2000 Te Kawau (Peter Kemp) 20-17 Marist
- 2001 HSOB (Lewis Williams) 21-19 COB
- 2002 Te Kawau (Stu Trembath) 16-11 Marist
- 2003 Te Kawau (Stu Trembath) 23-16 Marist
- 2004 Varsity (Steve Morris) 26-8 HSOB
- 2005 College OB (Graeme Tanner) 27-16 Feilding Old Boys
- 2006 College OB (Dean Andrew) 13-0 Varsity
- 2007 College OB (John Cruden) 33-18 Feilding
- 2008 Kia Toa (Tasi Tahuna) 11-6 Te Kawa
- 2009 Kia Toa (Anthony Rehutai) 29-23 Varsity
- 2010 Varsity (Geoff Thompson) 11-10 Feilding Old Boys-Oroua
- 2011 Varsity (Geoff Thompson) 29-27 Te Kawa
- 2012 College OB (Aaron Good) 34-20 Varsity
- 2013 Kia Toa 37-15 Varsity
- 2014 College Old Boys 21-10 Kia Toa
- 2015 College Old Boys 32-21 Kia Toa
- 2016 Varsity 18-17 Kia Toa
- 2017 Old Boys Marist 28-27 Kia Toa
- 2018 Feilding Old Boys-Oroua (Glen Gregory) 24-22 Feilding
- 2019 Feilding (Kelvin Tantrum & Nathan Williams) 16-14 Varsity
- 2020 Feilding (Nathan Williams) 27-24 Varsity
- 2021 Feilding 22-18 Varsity
- 2022 College Old Boys (Kingi Matenga) 24-5 Old Boys Marist
- 2023 Varsity (Scott Lewis & Blair van Stipriaan) 34-33 College Old Boys
- 2024 Kia Toa (Michael Tagicakibau) 40-30 College Old Boys
- 2025 Varsity (Scott Lewis) 29-27 Kia Toa
- 2026 Kia Toa (Bethel Fau’olo) 59-27 Massey University

== Manawatu representative players ==
=== Centurions - 100 matches for Manawatu ===
Name	Years	Games
Gary Knight	1975–1986	145
Ken Granger	1971–1984	128
Geoff Old	1975–1985	117
Murray Rosenbrook	1979–1986	111
Mark Donaldson	1974–1985	110
Rob Foreman	2006–2015	110
Bruce Hemara	1978–1990	108
Kevin Eveleigh	1969–1978	107
Perry Harris	1970–1979	106
Nick Crosswell	2006–2019	104
Don McCaskie	1956–1967	101

=== Manawatu All Blacks ===
In New Zealand, to be selected to the All Blacks is the pinnacle of rugby achievement. In its history, Manawatu have produced many players who have been selected for the national team.

Name	All Black Number	Years	Total matches (tests)	Club	Nickname	About
Bull Allen	933	1993–97	27 (8)	Massey University	"Bull"	A 'cult hero' and loosehead prop, he is more associated with his home province of Taranaki, from where he made his All Black debut. However, in 1997, he moved to Manawatu, where he captained the Manawatu/Hawkes Bay Central Vikings. It was from this position that he played his one and only test match as a starting player (against England at Twickenham – his last test).
Keith Bagley	548	1953–54	20 (0)	Kia Toa		Retired at aged 23 to his family farm.
Robert (Bob) Burgess	690	1971–73	30 (7)	Massey University		Debuted for the All Blacks against the 1971 Lions. He was a stand out player in this series before being injured in the 3rd test which ended his season. Toured Britain in 1972/73 before retiring in 1973. An anti-apartheid activist, Burgess declined consideration for the 1970 tour to South Africa and campaigned against the 1981 tour by the Springboks.
John Callesen	727	1974–76	18 (4)	High School Old Boys ♦		Second rower whose career was ended by back problems. Went back to the farm after excelling for both Manawatu and the All Blacks.
Lachlan Cameron	796	1979–81	17 (5)	Massey University	Lachie	An exciting midfielder from the Varsity club. In 1981 he played in the dramatic 3rd Test versus the Springboks at Eden Park.
Alphonsus Carroll	217	1920	8 (0)	Jackeytown ♣	"Phonse"	A dairy farmer, he played his first game of rugby at aged 22 in 1917. Toured Australia in 1920. Politically 'left of centre' he was a 'conscientious objector' during World War One. Switched codes to Rugby league in 1925 and represented the Kiwis.
Sam Cockroft	21	1893	12 (0)	Palmerston ♣		Played only one season in Manawatu.
Aaron Cruden	1105	2010–17	50 (50)	College Old Boys		First Five-Eighth, made his All Black debut on 10 June 2010 against Ireland in New Plymouth. Cancer survivor and son of former Manawatu forward Stu Cruden.
Christian Cullen	952	1996–2002	60 (58)	Kia Toa	"Paekakariki Express"	One of world rugby's most talented and entertaining fullbacks of any era. Was a Wellingtonian for most of his All Black career. Shot to stardom at the 1996 Hong Kong Sevens.
Chresten Davis	958	1996	2 (0)	Massey University.	"Chester"	
Mark Donaldson	781	1977–81	35 (13)	High School Old Boys♦	"Bullet"	An inspiration to Manawatu rugby. Later coached an exciting and youthful Manawatu side in the early-90s. In 1981, in his last touch of the ball in All Black rugby, Donaldson took a quick-thinking tap on a free kick late in the series-deciding test against South Africa. This play was instrumental in setting up Alan Hewson's famous last-minute penalty goal.[1]
Kevin Eveleigh	740	1974–77	30 (4)	Feilding	"Hayburner"	Voted Rugby News' 'All Black player of the tour', to South Africa, 1976.
Brian Finlay	596	1959	1 (1)	Marist ♦		Debuted at aged 31. His only test against the 1959 Lions, the famous 1st test where Don Clarke's six penalty goals gave New Zealand an 18–17 win. Finlay was badly injured early but returned to the field after treatment. Due to injury was not considered for the remainder of the series.
Jack Finlay	455	1946	1 (1)	Feilding Old Boys ♦		World War Two shortened his potential All Black career.
Mark Finlay	856	1984	2 (0)	High School Old Boys ♦		ex PNBHS 1st XV star who toured Fiji.
William Freebairn	554	1953–54	14 (0)	Feilding	"Stewie"	Feilding Agricultural High School.
Ken Granger	755	1976	6 (0)	Freyberg Old Boys	"Gringo"	Manawatu stalwart who retired after a record 128 games for the province. An outstanding 1976 season earned him a winger's position on the end of year tour to Argentina. He was given the nickname 'Gringo' on this tour.
Perry Harris	751	1976	4 (1)	Te Kawau		Called into the injury hit All Black tour party in South Africa, two days after Manawatu's historic Ranfurly Shield win at Eden Park, in 1976. Played the 3rd test of that tour.
Bruce Hemara	859	1985	3 (0)	Freyberg Old Boys		Manawatu Player of the Year 1983, NZ Māori representative. With All Black hooking incumbent, Andy Dalton, unavailable for the All Blacks' tour to Argentina in 1985, Hemara was his natural replacement. In 1986, Dalton was away with the New Zealand Cavaliers in South Africa which allowed Hemara to win selection for the All Blacks in the first test against France. Injury prevented Hemara from making his much deserved test debut and Sean Fitzpatrick took his place. Later, Hemara became assistant coach of the Turbos (2006–10).
Jackson Hemopo	1173	2018–	1 (1)	Kia Toa		Member of the PNBHS 1st XV. Called in to the All Blacks squad as injury cover and made his debut against France in June 2018.
Ron Horsley	610	1960–64	3 (0)	Kia Toa	"Honest Ron"	Made his All Black debut playing for Wellington. The imposing lock forward captained Manawatu in 1962 before coaching Kia Toa.
Gary Knight	782	1977–86	66 (36)	High School Old Boys ♦	"Axle"	The lyric "Let them feel the power of country might" was surely written with him in mind. Famously hit by a flour bomb dropped by a protest aircraft vs South Africa at Eden Park in 1981. Won the New Zealand Rugby Player of the Year trophy in 1981.
Kent Lambert	718	1972–77	40 (11)	Massey University		Formidable prop forward. Went to Penrith Panthers in the NSWRL, 1978. Was one of the first All Blacks to publicly complain about the financial burden of amateur rugby. Was a truck driver during his playing days. Injury cut short his league career.
Ngani Laumape	1160	2017–	8 (6)	Kia Toa		Member of the PNBHS 1st XV. Started playing rugby league for the New Zealand Warriors. Switched back to rugby union in 2016.
Arthur Law	319	1925	4 (0)	High School Old Boys ♦		A farmer, he was a star for the PNBHS 1st XV for several seasons.
John Loveday	787	1978	7 (0)	High School Old Boys ♦		A chiropractor by trade, he ironically suffered from a 'bad back' which limited his appearances on his one and only All Black tour: the victorious Grand Slam of 1978. He was a pivotal member of the Ranfurly Shield side in the 1970s but in 1979 he retired from rugby to concentrate on his medical career.
Rod McKenzie	403	1934–38	35 (9)	Kia Toa	"Squire"	
Alex McMinn	114	1904	1 (1)	College St Old Boys ♣	Paddy	His Irish father was sent out to New Zealand by a London newspaper to cover the 'Māori wars' in Taranaki in 1963 and later established the Manawatu Evening Standard. Paddy's younger brother 'Archie' was also an All Black.
Archibald McMinn	102	1903–05	10 (2)	Institute ♣	Archie	An imposing line-out specialist with the pace of a wing three-quarter. A fishmonger who died in 1919 aged 38.
John Mowlem	37	1893	4 (0)	Palmerston ♣		
Mick O'Callaghan	676	1968	3 (3)	Massey University		A winger and crowd favourite, played for Manawatu until the 1979 season.
Geoff Old	817	1980–83	17 (3)	High School Old Boys ♦		A police officer, he was on active duty during the 1981 Springbok tour together with playing in the series deciding test at Eden Park, won 25–22 by the All Blacks.
Frank Oliver	750	1976–81	43 (17)	Marist ♦	"Filth"	A welcome recruit from Southland in 1979, one year after being a member of the All Blacks historic Grand Slam winning tour of the UK and Ireland. An integral part of the 1980 NPC winning side. Selected on the centenary tour of Wales in late 1980.
Doug Rollerson	758	1976–81	24 (8)	Massey University		In 1980 he was player of the season in Manawatu's championship winning team and in the same year he starred on the All Blacks centenary tour to Wales. His dropped goal, which creaked over the bar against the Springboks in the dramatic 3rd Test in 1981, helped the All Blacks win this memorable series. Shocked NZ rugby when he announced he was leaving for the North Sydney Bears in the NSWRL for the 1982 season. His subsequent professional rugby league career was considered unsuccessful, persistent injuries didn't help. He died on 3 May 2017, aged 63, after a long battle with cancer.
Kevin Schuler	904	1989–95	13 (4)	Massey University	"Herb"	
Mark Shaw	810	1980–86	69 (30)	Kia Toa	"Cowboy"	A meat worker at the Longburn Freezing Works.
Graham Shannon	31	1893	6 (0)	Marton ♥		
Aaron Smith	1112	2012–	74 (74)	Feilding	"Nugget"	Became the All Black's first choice halfback in 2013.
Sam Strahan	657	1967–73	45 (17)	Oroua ♦		Imposing second rower, formed a formidable combination with John Calleson.
Craig Wickes	821	1980	1 (0)	Palmerston North Boys' High School		At aged 18 years, 196 days this schoolboy winger was the 2nd youngest All Black ever, behind 17-year-old Lui Paewai in 1923. A series of knee injuries, sustained in 1981, destroyed his chance of playing for the All Blacks again and limited his provincial and club rugby future as well.

♦ = indicates a club amalgamated with another

♥ = indicates a club no longer in the Manawatu Rugby Union

♣ = a club no longer extant

=== All Blacks formerly from Manawatu ===
Name	All Black Number	Years	Total matches (tests)	Club when at Manawatu	About
John Buxton	573	1955	2 (2)	Massey University	
Graham Delamore	493	1949	9 (1)		represented Manawatu 1943–44.
Keith Gudsell	500	1949	6 (0)	Massey University	
Jason Eaton	1063	2005–09	17 (17)	Feilding	Manawatu (2002–03); Moved to Taranaki before making All Black debut.
Jason Hewett	914	1991	1 (1)	Massey University	Manawatu (1988–90). He was recruited into the Auckland NPC side midway through 1990. He made his All Black debut at the 1991 World Cup.
John Hotop	540	1952	3 (3)	Massey University	
Brian Molloy	588	1957	5 (0)	Massey University	
Dick Myers	779	1977	5 (1)	Massey University	
Bob Oliphant	45	1893	3 (0)		
Syd Orchard	61	1896	8 (0)		
Mark Ranby	1001	2001	1 (1)	Massey University	Moved to Waikato before becoming an All Black.
Keith Reid	365	1929	5 (2)		
Lee Stensness	932	1993–97	14 (8)	Massey University	Played his last game for Manawatu in 1992, before moving to Auckland. The following year he made his All Black debut, in the deciding test against the Lions at Eden Park, which the All Blacks won 30–13. Injury and loss of form meant he played just eight tests.
Bob Stuart	510	1949–54	27 (7)		Played 4 matches for Manawatu in 1941.
Kel Tremain	604	1959–68	38 (27)	Massey University	Played 6 games for Manawatu in 1958
Wilson Whineray	585	1957–65	77 (32)	Massey University	Played for Manawatu in 1955 before leaving for Canterbury.
Murray Watts	793	1979–80	13 (5)	Teachers College - Freyberg	A Manawatu junior All Black who moved back to Taranaki before becoming an All Black.
Dion Waller	1011	2001	3 (1)	Marist	Played the 1997 and 1998 seasons with Manawatu and the Central Vikings before becoming an All Black with Wellington.

=== Manawatu players in Super Rugby ===
Manawatu is in the Hurricanes catchment area, along with Wanganui, Hawke's Bay, Poverty Bay, Horowhenua Kapiti, Wairarapa-Bush and Wellington. However players from Manawatu may be selected and signed by any of the Super Rugby franchises.

Manawatu players who have played for Super Rugby teams are:

Player	Team(s) represented	Notes
Michael Alaalatoa	Crusaders	
Fraser Armstrong	Hurricanes	
Otere Black	Hurricanes, Blues	
Jamie Booth	Hurricanes	
Nick Crosswell	Chiefs, Highlanders	Foundation Turbo (2006-2014); Captain (2009–13)
Aaron Cruden	Chiefs	All Black
Jason Emery	Highlanders	
Maʻafu Fia	Highlanders	
Chris Eves	Hurricanes	
Michael Fitzgerald	Chiefs	
Ngani Laumape	Hurricanes	All Black
Johnny Leota	Highlanders	
Nehe Milner-Skudder	Hurricanes	All Black
Liam Mitchell	Hurricanes	
Hamish Northcott	Blues	
Hadleigh Parkes	Blues, Hurricanes	Turbo 2010, also played for Southern Kings in South Africa and 29 matches for Wales
Aaron Smith	Highlanders	All Black
Andre Taylor	Hurricanes	
Doug Tietjens	Highlanders	
Asaeli Tikoirotuma	Chiefs	
Hayden Triggs	Highlanders	NZ Maoris

=== Other distinguished players ===
- Kurt Baker – moved to Taranaki; played Super Rugby for Highlanders.
- Josh Bradnock – Foundation Turbo – Captain, 60+ Games, Hurricanes player who would have played many Super games if career was not lost to multiple tendon injuries.
- John Brady - Played 15 matches for Auckland 1960–65. Trialled for the Wallabies in 1966, but was not selected due to nationality issues.
- Hugh Blair – 1970s winger, Ranfurly Shield hero and crowd favourite, from the Varsity Club of Massey University. Instantly recognisable with his long blond hair, headband and beard. Went on to lecture at Auckland University.
- Francisco Bosch (rugby union) – (2006–08) Foundation Turbo. Represented Argentina for tests vs Chile, Japan, Samoa and South Africa in 2004–05. Also a former Sevens player for Argentina.
- Jim Carroll – The son of Manawatu All Black Alphonsus Carroll, he was an outstanding first-five eighth during Manawatu's Ranfurly Shield reign from 1976 to 1978. Scored the winning try from a charge-down in the 15–10 win over Counties in 1977. This shield defence was perhaps Manawatu's most memorable.
- Denis Clare – hooker during the Ranfurly Shield and National Championship winning era.
- Alan Innes – from the early Hamer years.
- Andrew McMaster – Represented the NZ Combined Services. An exciting winger who transferred to Manawatu's Ohakea Air Force Base in 1984. Prior to this he starred for Canterbury during their memorable Ranfurly Shield era (1982–85).
- Terry Sole – Loose forward during the early, and most successful, Hamer years.
- Alex Tatana – Midfielder – Hamer years, early to mid-1980s.
- Ian Wood – Midfielder who came close to All Black selection in 1985–86. Considered unlucky not to have been selected for cancelled 1985 tour of South Africa and subsequent replacement tour to Argentina.

== Coaches ==
- Jack Gleeson: (1965-69) - Coach of the New Zealand national under-21 rugby union team from 1975 to 1976 and the All Blacks from 1977 to 1978.
- Owen Gleeson (1970-74)
- Graham Hamer: (1975-86) - Coached the Ranfurly Shield and National Championship winning teams of the 1970s and 1980s.
- Kevin Eveleigh (1987): All Black Flanker 1974–77.
- Gary Walker (1988).
- Garth Thelin, assisted by Donnie McCaskie (1989). Under Thelin the team only lost one 2nd division championship match (against Southland who were promoted) but he was replaced after this one season.
- Mark Donaldson: (1990-92) - Former All Black half-back.
- Ian Snook: (1993-94)
- Frank Oliver: (1995–97) - Later coached the Central Vikings, Hurricanes and Blues.
- Ken Maharey and Andrew McMaster (Assistant): (2001-03)
- Peter Kemp: (2004)
- Charlie McAlister: (2005)
- Dave Rennie (2006–11): Foundation Manawatu Turbos coach. Left at the end of 2011 season to become 2012 coach of Chiefs. The Chiefs subsequently won back-to-back Super Rugby titles in 2012 and 2013. Coached Australia.
- Jason O'Halloran (2011–2015): Assistant and successor of Dave Rennie. Coach of the ITM Cup Championship winning team of 2014 leading to promotion to the ITM Cup Premiership in 2015.
- Jeremy Cotter (2016–2018): Assistant to Jason O'Halloran before being promoted to the Head Coach role. Brother of Scotland coach, Vern Cotter.
- Peter Russell (2019 - 2022): Formerly coach of Marist St Pats (Wellington), Wairarapa Bush, Hawkes Bay, Newcastle Falcons and Japanese club NEC Green Rockets.
- Mike Rogers (2023 - 2024): Formerly assistant coach of Bay of Plenty, the Chiefs Manawa and Waikato Farah Palmer Cup teams and the New England Free Jacks.
- Wesley Clarke (2025-): Formerly coached the Manawatū Cyclones (2009-2013), Manawatū Women’s Sevens team and Hurricanes Poua (2022). Also assistant coach of the Turbos (2011-13), Black Ferns (2015-2022), New Zealand Under 20 (2023) and defence coach at the Kobelco Kobe Steelers in Japan Rugby League One

== Support ==
Fans of Manawatu rugby are known throughout the rugby community in New Zealand for their habit of wearing plastic garden buckets cut to shape over their heads during matches. As such, fans of the provincial side have picked up the self-named nickname of "Bucketheads".

=== Theme Songs ===
Manawatu had two theme songs during their 'glory' years, which were played on radio '2ZA' in the days leading up to the big games on Saturday. They were:

- A Ranfurly Shield theme song 1976–78 (sung to the melody of the American civil war song When Johnny Comes Marching Home): "We're Manawatu, we've got the shield huh rah, huh rah!..."
- A later song (early 1980s) was used prior to NPC and Ranfurly Shield challenges: "We'll pass the ball and run it, green and white! And let them feel the power of country might!..."
- A much earlier song, On The Ball, was sung at Manawatu games during its foundation years and beyond. According to Manawatu rugby historian, Clive Akers, it was composed in Palmerston North by team captain Ted Secker and was 'made famous by the 1888 Native team that toured Britain'. Akers said further 'it would rate as Manawatu's greatest contribution to the rugby world'. Its chorus went: "On the Ball! On the Ball! On the Ball! Thro' scrummage, three-quarters and all, sticking together we keep on the leather, and shout as we go, On the Ball!"

== Women's rugby: Manawatu Cyclones ==
Manawatu Cyclones
- Union: Manawatu Rugby Union
- Location: Manawatū-Whanganui
- Ground: Central Energy Trust Arena (Capacity: 18,000)
- Coach: John Kendal Stu Ross
- Captain: Rachael Rakatau
- League: Women's Provincial Championship
- 2012: 5th
Team kit

Official website
- www.manawaturugby.co.nz

Manawatu Cyclones is the women's representative team. The Cyclones wear the same green and white tramline jersey design as the men's team.

=== Women's Provincial Championship ===
In 2005, the team was promoted from the Second Division. In 2006, however, Manawatu did not win a game in the competition, which saw the team play against the likes of Auckland, Wellington and Otago. Manawatu drew with Hawke's Bay.

In 2012, the Women's Provincial Championship format was a full round robin of six teams playing six rounds (each team with one bye round). The Cyclones began with a bye. Wins for the Cyclones were over Waikato, Wellington and Hawke's Bay. Unfortunately large losses to Otago and eventual finalists Auckland and Canterbury and missing crucial bonus points, meant the Cyclones did not make the post-season.

Notable Cyclones:

- Carys Dallinger
- Sarah Hirini
- Marilyn Live
- Rebecca Mahoney
- Kaipo Olsen-Baker
- Farah Palmer
- Rachael Rakatau
- Janna Vaughan
- Selica Winiata

== New Zealand Rugby Museum ==
Palmerston North is the home of the New Zealand Rugby Museum and also the Sport & Rugby Institute at the Turitea Campus, Massey University.
