= Mowlem (surname) =

Mowlem, also Mowlam, is a surname. Notable people with the surname include:

== Mowlem ==
- Arthur Rainsford Mowlem (1902–1986), New Zealand-born British plastic surgeon
- John Mowlem (1788–1868), British stonemason and builder
- John Mowlem (rugby union) (1870–1951), New Zealand rugby union player
- Johnny Mowlem (born 1969), British racing driver

== Mowlam ==
- Mo Mowlam (1949–2005), English politician
- Stephen Mowlam (born 1976), Australian hockey player
