= Jeremy Cotter =

- Born: 1967 or 1968 (age 57–58) New Zealand
- University: Massey University
- Notable relative: Vern Cotter (brother)

Rugby union career
- Position: Lock/Loose forward
Amateur team(s)
Years	Team	Apps	(Points)
- Te Puke
–	Western Bay of Plenty		
Provincial / State sides
Years	Team	Apps	(Points)
1986	Manawatu Under-18		
Coaching career
- Years: Team
- Te Puke
- Bay of Plenty Development
- 2013 —18: Manawatu

Jeremy Cotter (born 1967/1968) is a New Zealand rugby union coach. He is the former head coach of the Manawatu provincial side who compete in the Mitre 10 Cup. He is the brother of Vern Cotter, the current coach at Montpellier.

Cotter originated from the town of Te Puke in the Bay Of Plenty.

== Playing career ==
As a player Cotter played in the lock and loose forward positions. He played for the Te Puke club. He never made it to a provincial level, but did represent the Western Bay of Plenty sub-union.

He spent 1986 attending Massey University in Palmerston North, where he played for Manawatu U-18s.

== Coaching career ==
After not reaching any serious achievements as a player for Te Puke, Cotter became the team's coach and in 2011 lead them to their first Baywide (senior rugby competition) title.

He coached the Bay of Plenty Development side.

In 2013, Cotter becsme the Manawatu Turbos' forwards coach.

In 2015 head coach of the Turbos Jason O'Halloran announced he would be leaving New Zealand for Scotland to become an assistant for the national team, joining Cotter's brother, Vern in the coaching staff.

The Manawatu Rugby Union then announced that Cotter would become head coach of the team for the 2016 season.

== Personal ==
Outside of rugby, Cotter has a wife and three children. He also has a sheep and beef farm in western Bay of Plenty, near Te Puke, and owns a contracting business.
