= David Te Moana =

NZ rugby union player (born 1982)

- Born: 16 February 1982 (age 44) Whakatāne, New Zealand
- Height: 1.91 m (6 ft 3 in)
- Weight: 126 kg (19 st 12 lb)
- School: Ōpōtiki College

Rugby union career
- Position: Prop
Amateur team(s)
Years	Team	Apps	(Points)
- Te Kawau
Senior career
Years	Team	Apps	(Points)
2009–2010	SU Agen	13	(0)
Provincial / State sides
Years	Team	Apps	(Points)
2006–2009	Manawatu	37	(5)
2010	Wellington	2	(0)
2011–2012	Manawatu	7	(10)
Super Rugby
Years	Team	Apps	(Points)
2006	Western Force	6	(0)
2007	Queensland Reds	5	(0)
2011	Highlanders	6	(0)

David Te Moana (born 16 February 1982) is a New Zealand rugby union player who plays at prop. He notably played for Manawatu in the National Provincial Championship.

== Playing career ==
A late starter, Te Moana didn't play an organised rugby match until he was 18, and had moved to Australia to work in construction before he started taking the sport seriously. By 2005, he had found his way into the Queensland Reds academy, and for the 2006 Super 14 season was included in the Western Force squad for their inaugural season.

After making 6 substitute appearances in his season for the Force, Te Moana found himself back with the Reds for the 2007 Super 14 season, making 5 starts. However, this would be his last appearance in the competition for a further 4 years.

Te Moana returned to New Zealand to compete in the 2006 Air New Zealand Cup, and after his options in Australia were at an end, continued on until 2009 as one of the starting props for the Manawatu Turbos. For the 2009–10 season, he signed in France with 2nd division SU Agen. He made 13 appearances for the squad, helping them earn promotion to the Top 14 but was released at the conclusion of the season due to import restrictions.

On his return to New Zealand, Te Moana signed to play for Wellington for the 2010 ITM Cup. He made only 2 appearances for the side, and transferred back to Manawatu at the conclusion of the campaign.

Despite his lack of playing time for Wellington, he impressed coach Jamie Joseph enough that, when Joseph was hired of the coach of the Highlanders for the 2011 Super Rugby season, Te Moana was offered a contract.

Te Moana made his Highlanders debut as the starting tighthead prop in the team's 14–9 win over the Hurricanes in the opening fixture of the season on 18 February, and went on to make 6 appearances over the course of the season. He was not retained by the club for 2012.

Te Moana returned to Manawatu for the 2011 ITM Cup, and continued to represent the province through 2012.

Since retiring from rugby, Te Moana is self-employed and lives in the town of Feilding.
