= Te Kawau =

NZ rugby union club, based in Rongotea

Te Kawau RFC is a rugby union club in the Manawatu province. It is based in Rongotea which is roughly a 15-minute drive from Palmerston North. The Te Kawau rugby uniform consists of green and black hooped socks, black shorts and a green and black hooped jersey.

Te Kawau is a Māori term meaning "Great cormorant". This is reflected in the club's logo which the supporters are two cormorants.

== History ==
The current club was formed as a result of the locals believing that the area would be best suited to be run as one club, the new club attracting players from Hui Mai, Awahuri and Newbury as well as Rongotea.

The club has entered a team in the Manawatu Rugby Union senior 1 competition every year since 1953.

The club's senior 1 success has fluctuated but reached a pinnacle in 1962 when with Viv Long as coach they won the senior 1 competition. From there its success was limited until 1997 when the senior 1 team coached by Geoff Webb and David Staite uplifted the Hankin Shield and won 57 undefeated senior 1 competition games in succession.

== Facilities ==
Apart from rugby Te Kawau also offers: netball, tennis, lawn bowls and badminton.

== Notable players ==
- Simon Easton - 40 games for Manawatu (2000-2005)
- Michael Fitzgerald - 55 games for the Manawatu (2009-2015). 58 games for the Chiefs (2012-2015)
- Perry Harris - Over 100 games for Manawatu. One game for the All Blacks (1976).
- Liam Mitchell (rugby union) - 14 games for Manawatu (2017-2021) and 23 games for the Hurricanes (2019-2021).
- David Te Moana - Over 40 games for Manawatu (2006-2012). Western Force, Queensland Reds and Highlanders (rugby union) in Super Rugby (2006-2011)
- Doug Tietjens - 45 games for Manawatu and 6 games for the Highlanders (2012).
- Asaeli Tikoirotuma - 65 games for Manawatu (2010-2014), 45 games for the Chiefs (2012-2014) and over 20 games for the Fiji national rugby union team
