= Archie McMinn =

- Born: Archibald Forbes McMinn; 14 August 1880 Marton, New Zealand
- Died: 23 April 1919 (aged 38) Porirua, New Zealand
- Height: 1.90 m (6 ft 3 in)
- Weight: 92 kg (203 lb)
- Notable relative(s): Paddy McMinn (brother); Alexander McMinn (father)

Rugby union career
- Position: Loose forward
Provincial / State sides
Years	Team	Apps	(Points)
1903	Wairarapa	2	
1904–05, 08–09	Manawatu		
International career
Years	Team	Apps	(Points)
1903–05	New Zealand	2	(6)

Archibald Forbes McMinn (14 August 1880 – 23 April 1919) was a New Zealand rugby union player. A loose forward, McMinn represented Wairarapa and Manawatu at a provincial level, and was a member of the New Zealand national side, the All Blacks, from 1903 to 1905. He played 10 matches for the All Blacks including two internationals. His father was Irish journalist Alexander McMinn, who founded the Manawatu Evening Standard newspaper in 1880.
