= Craig Wickes =

New Zealand rugby union player

- Born: 26 February 1962 (age 64) Whakatāne, New Zealand
- Height: 1.78 m (5 ft 10 in)
- Weight: 83 kg (183 lb)
- School: Palmerston North Boys' High School

Rugby union career
- Position(s): Winger, centre
Amateur team(s)
Years	Team	Apps	(Points)
- Kia Toa
Provincial / State sides
Years	Team	Apps	(Points)
1980–1986	Manawatu		
International career
Years	Team	Apps	(Points)
1980	New Zealand	1	(0)

Craig David Wickes (born 26 February 1962) is a former New Zealand rugby player. He is notable as being the second-youngest All Black ever and the only player selected while still at high school.

== Career ==
Wickes was born in Whakatāne and his family moved to Palmerston North when he was around 10. He attended Palmerston North Boys' High School. He was also a sprinter, with best times of 10.9 seconds for the 100m sprint and 23.0 seconds for 200m.

He was selected as a winger for the Manawatu rugby team in 1979, aged 17, and also played for New Zealand Colts. In 1980 he was selected as a reserve for the All Black team to play a non-test match against Fiji at Auckland on 13 September 1980 (making him 18 years 200 days). The selection policy for this match excluded all players who had played against Australia and France earlier in the season. He replaced injured winger Ken Taylor with 14 minutes remaining in the game, but made little impact. In 1981 he sustained a series of knee injuries which prevented him from going further. He returned to the Manawatu squad for four games in 1986, but a recurrence of the knee injuries ended his career.
