= Brian Finlay =

NZ international rugby union player (1927–1982)

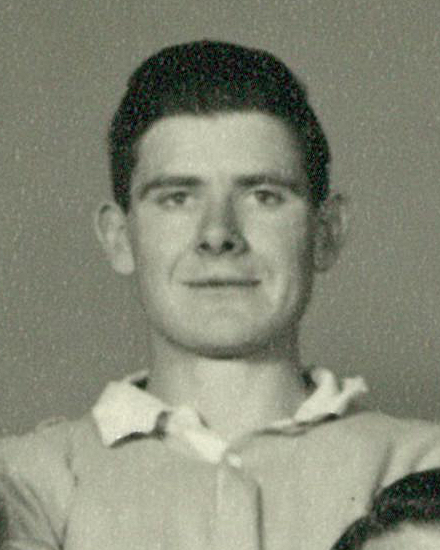
- Finlay in 1950
- Born: Brian Edward Louis Finlay; 7 November 1927 Cromwell, New Zealand
- Died: 9 March 1982 (aged 54) Auckland, New Zealand
- Height: 1.78 m (5 ft 10 in)
- Weight: 88 kg (194 lb)
- School: St Patrick's College, Wellington
- University: Massey Agricultural College
- Notable relative: Jack Finlay (cousin)
- Occupation: Joiner

Rugby union career
- Positions: Mid-field back; flanker
Provincial / State sides
Years	Team	Apps	(Points)
1950–1960	Manawatu		
International career
Years	Team	Apps	(Points)
1959	New Zealand	1	(0)

Brian Edward Louis Finlay (7 November 1927 – 9 March 1982) was a New Zealand rugby union player. After playing most of his provincial career for Manawatu as a mid-field back, he switched to flanker during the 1958 season, and played his only test for the New Zealand national team, the All Blacks, the following year. He retired from playing representative rugby in 1960, having made over 100 first-class appearances.

== Early life and family ==
Born in Cromwell on 7 November 1927, Finlay was the son of Gertrude Margaret Finlay (née Flannery) and John Finlay. Both of his parents were schoolteachers. He was a cousin of rugby player and decorated soldier Jack Finlay.

Brian Finlay was educated at St Patrick's College, Wellington, where he played as a fullback and halfback.

After leaving school, Finlay played for the Marist club in Wellington. He then moved to Palmerston North, where he earned a Diploma of Agriculture at Massey Agricultural College in 1950. That year, he was a member of the Massey senior 'A' team—alongside players including John Hotop and Hiwi Tauroa (captain)—that won the Manawatu senior 'A' club competition and Jubilee Cup. In 1951, Finlay joined the Palmerston North Marist club.

== Representative rugby career ==
=== Mid-field back, 1950–1958 ===
Finlay made his provincial debut for Manawatu in 1950. During the season, he made ten appearances for Manawatu, seven at centre and three in the five-eighths, scoring a total of five tries. He also played for a combined Manawatu–Horowhenua side at centre against the touring British Isles team. In its review of Manawatu's season, the annual Rugby Almanack of New Zealand opined:

"At centre Finlay had a good season, always appealing as a grand attacking player, speedy and resourceful, when given a chance with room in which to move."

In the 1951 season, Finlay played 11 matches for Manawatu at second five-eighth, scoring four tries. The Rugby Almanack of New Zealand said that Finlay had "a very good season", and, while noting the paucity of class players in that position was one of New Zealand's greatest weaknesses, held that he was close to being of international standard.

Finlay played at second five-eighth in all 10 of Manawatu's matches in 1952, scoring two tries and one drop goal for his side during the season. The Rugby Almanack of New Zealand said that he "combined well" with his Marist club mate, W. M. White, in the five-eighths, "without quite making the best of their opportunities". Finlay also played at second five-eighth for the North Island in the annual inter-island match, and was an All Black reserve for games against Australia and New Zealand Māori.

In the 1953 provincial season, Finlay played at second five-eighth in six of Manawatu's 13 games, and the Rugby Almanack of New Zealand commented that the position "was never really competently filled". He was nominated for an All Blacks trial, but was not selected.

In the 1954 season, Finlay was said by the Rugby Almanack of New Zealand to have been "a useful inside back, who however was not always in good form". During the season, he appeared in all but one of Manawatu's 10 games, playing at centre and fullback once each and his remaining games at second five-eighth, but did not score any points.

After not appearing for Manawatu in 1955, with the speedy and penetrating Colin Garnett being preferred at second five-eighth, Finlay returned to the side for the 1956 season, playing at centre in all eight of Manawatu's games, scoring four tries. He also made four appearances for the combined Manawatu–Horowhenua team, playing at centre in three matches and second-five eighth in the game against the touring Springboks, without scoring.

In 1957, Finlay made 10 appearances for Manawatu, all but one of them at first five-eighth and the other at second five-eighth, without scoring.

Finlay played at centre in Manawatu's first two games of the 1958 season, before switching to play as a flanker. Ironically, his last game in the backline, against Wellington, was also his most successful points-wise for his province until then, being the first time that he scored two tries in a match for Manawatu. For most of Manawatu's games for the rest of the season, Finlay's place at centre or second five-eighth was taken by Murray Ball. However, Finlay continued at centre for the whole season for his Marist club team.

=== Flanker, 1958–1960 ===
Finlay's first game at flanker for Manawatu was in the Ranfurly Shield challenge against Taranaki on 6 August 1958, after having been a mid-field back for the whole of his playing career. The experiment was seen to have immediately paid off when Finlay scored his team's opening try in the match, although Taranaki went on to win the game narrowly, 9–8, and Finlay's performance in the rest of the match was described as "inconspicuous". Manawatu persisted with Finlay as a flanker for the remaining seven games of the season and he scored one more try, against Horowhenua. The Rugby Almanack of New Zealand called the switch "highly successful".

Such was the success of Finlay's move into the forward pack that in 1959 he had regional and North Island trials as a flanker, scoring a try in the regional trial on 28 May, and was selected in that position for the North Island in the inter-island match at Athletic Park, Wellington, on 13 June. In that match, in which the North Island defeated the South Island 30–14, it was reported that in loose play, Finlay "stood out with his backing up and sure handling". It was said that "he was extremely fast to the loose ball, and his speed, more than that of any other North Island forward, enabled the North Island to succeed so well with its play from the tackled ball". The Press newspaper remarked:

"[Finlay] demonstrated quite clearly in the inter-island match recently that he has all the attributes of a high class flanker. It is not beyond the realms of possibility that he may yet win a New Zealand cap as a forward, thereby matching the deeds of his cousin."

That prediction came to pass, and Finlay was duly selected for the All Blacks for the first test against the touring British Lions at Carisbrook on 18 July 1959, narrowly won by New Zealand, 18–17. Finlay's selection, at the expense of Colin Meads, was seen as "the only real surprise" and the "most unexpected feature" of the team, as he had been largely absent from top-class rugby in New Zealand between 1953 and 1957, had played only a few representative matches as a forward, and, at age 31, was comparatively old for an All Black debutant.

A preview of the first test noted that Finlay was an "excellent exponent" of broken and loose play, and that he could be "relied upon to do as well in this play as the British Isles loose forwards". However, he suffered a knee injury tackling Lions halfback Dickie Jeeps in the tenth minute of the match. In the era when replacements were not allowed, Finlay returned to the field after treatment, but he was noticeably limping and his contributions for the remainder of the match were limited.

Finlay's injury in the first test against the Lions meant that he was not considered for selection for the remainder of the international series, but after recovering he appeared at flanker and scored a try for the combined Manawatu–Horowhenua team in their 6–26 loss against the Lions at Palmerston North on 11 August. During the 1959 season, Finlay played nine matches and scored three tries for Manawatu, and the Manawatu flankers, Finlay and Neville Mears, were described as "just about the speediest and most effective in the country". At the end of the season, Finlay scored a try for Wilson Whineray's New Zealand XV in their 24–15 defeat of Peter Burke's Taranaki XV at Rugby Park in New Plymouth.

Finlay remained on the fringe of international selection in 1960, and was vice-captain of one of the All Blacks trial teams for that year's tour of Australia and South Africa, scoring a try. The Rugby Almanack of New Zealand noted that Finlay was still a "clever anticipator and useful link with his backs", but his performance in the final All Black trial match was described as "sporadic", and he was not selected for the tour.

In 1960, Finlay made nine appearances for Manawatu, scoring three tries, before retiring from representative rugby at the end of the season. During the season he played his 100th first-class game, becoming one of 96 New Zealand players to have reached that milestone as of the end of 1960.

== Rugby coaching ==
After retiring as a player, Finlay remained involved in rugby as a coach, both with Palmerston North Marist and the Ashhurst club. From 1973 to 1975, he was an assistant coach of the Manawatu Colts team.

== Later life and legacy ==
Finlay lived in Ashhurst and had a joinery business. He died at Auckland on 9 March 1982, and was buried at Kelvin Grove Cemetery in Palmerston North. His wife, Patrice Finlay, died in 2025. The couple had eight children.

The Brian Finlay Memorial Trophy is awarded annually by the Palmerston North Marist rugby club to the most improved back in the club's senior team.
