= Lachie Cameron =

- Born: Lachlan Murray Cameron; 12 April 1959 (age 67) Hamilton, New Zealand
- Height: 1.83 m (6 ft 0 in)
- Weight: 85 kg (187 lb)
- School: Hamilton Boys' High School
- University: Massey University

Rugby union career
- Position: Second five-eighth, centre
Provincial / State sides
Years	Team	Apps	(Points)
1978–82	Manawatu		
-	Counties		
International career
Years	Team	Apps	(Points)
1979–81	New Zealand	5	(0)

Lachlan Murray Cameron (born 12 April 1959) is a former New Zealand rugby union player. A second five-eighth and centre, Cameron represented Manawatu and Counties at a provincial level, and was a member of the New Zealand national side, the All Blacks, from 1979 to 1981. He played 17 matches for the All Blacks including five internationals.
