= Mark Donaldson (rugby union) =

- Born: Mark William Donaldson; 6 November 1955 (age 71) Palmerston North, New Zealand
- Height: 1.75 m (5 ft 9 in)
- Weight: 76 kg (12 st 0 lb)
- School: New Plymouth Boys' High School
- Notable relative: Frank Oliver (brother-in-law)
- Occupation: Hotel proprietor

Rugby union career
- Position: Half-back
Amateur team(s)
Years	Team	Apps	(Points)
1974	High School Old Boys		
1975–83	Hawke's Bay		
1984–85	Te Kawau		
Provincial / State sides
Years	Team	Apps	(Points)
1974, 1976–85	Manawatu		
1975	Hawke's Bay		
International career
Years	Team	Apps	(Points)
1974	New Zealand Colts		
1977–81	New Zealand	13	(4)
Coaching career
- Years: Team
- 1990–92: Manawatu

Mark William Donaldson (born 6 November 1955) is a former New Zealand half-back rugby union player. Donaldson played 35 matches, including 13 test matches, for the All Blacks from 1977 to 1981.

== Biography ==
After playing in the New Plymouth Boys' High School 1st XV for two years, Donaldson made his provincial debut for Manawatu in 1974 before joining Hawke's Bay in 1975. He returned to Manawatu in 1976.

Donaldson, nicknamed "Bullet", first played at the senior national level with the New Zealand Barbarians, in 1977 in Australia. He was then selected for the All Blacks team during their tour of France in 1977, playing five matches (including two test matches).

He continued his success with the All Blacks in 1978 with wins against the teams from Australia, England, and Scotland, but missed the matches against Wales due to injury.

In March 1979, Donaldson played in South Africa with a World Invitation XV and then in the All Blacks' series against France, Australia and Scotland. He subsequently lost his regular place in the All Black team to Dave Loveridge who was regarded as a more consistent performer.

He rejoined the All Blacks for the 1980 season against Australia, but was side-lined with a broken jaw after two matches. Recovering, he played during the All Black tours of Fiji and Wales. He was an All Black half-back reserve for the 1981 series against Scotland and the South African Springboks. Significantly, his only field time was during the historic 25–22 victory over the Springboks in Auckland when, late in the game, he replaced Loveridge, who was injured. Donaldson was instrumental in setting up the penalty play which resulted in the All Blacks winning the game.

As captain, he continued to play for Manawatu in 1982, taking a mid-season break in 1983. He switched to the Te Kawau Club in 1984, but missed most of the year due to injury, returning to competition in 1985, until a new injury caused him to permanently retire from playing.

Between 1990 and 1992, Donaldson coached the Manawatu side.

== Statistics ==
- Number of tests with the All Blacks: 13
- Other games with the All Blacks: 22
- Total number of games with the All Blacks: 35
- First game: 26 October 1977
- Last game: 12 September 1981
- Games with the All Blacks by year: 1977 – 5, 1978 – 12, 1979 – 11, 1980 – 6, and 1981 – 1
