= Geoff Old =

New Zealand rugby union footballer and coach (born 1956)

- Born: Geoffrey Haldane Old; 22 January 1956 (age 70) Eltham, New Zealand
- Height: 1.90 m (6 ft 3 in)
- Weight: 95 kg (209 lb)
- School: New Plymouth Boys' High School

Rugby union career
- Position: Number eight
Provincial / State sides
Years	Team	Apps	(Points)
1974	Taranaki	8	
1975–84	Manawatu		
International career
Years	Team	Apps	(Points)
1980–83	New Zealand	3	(0)
Coaching career
- Years: Team
- 1997–99: Netherlands

Geoffrey Haldane Old (born 22 January 1956) is a former New Zealand rugby union player. Predominantly a number eight, Old represented Taranaki briefly and then Manawatu at a provincial level, and was a member of the New Zealand national side, the All Blacks, from 1980 to 1983. He played 17 matches for the All Blacks including three internationals. He later coached the Dutch national side between 1997 and 1999.
