= Ken Taylor (rugby union) =

New Zealand rugby union player

- Born: Kenneth John Taylor; 30 November 1957 (age 68) Napier, New Zealand
- Height: 1.75 m (5 ft 9 in)
- Weight: 83 kg (183 lb)
- School: Central Hawke's Bay College
- Notable relative: Terrance Taylor

Rugby union career
- Position: Winger
Amateur team(s)
Years	Team	Apps	(Points)
1975-1993	Waipawa United		
Provincial / State sides
Years	Team	Apps	(Points)
1977–1985	Hawke's Bay	65	(100)
International career
Years	Team	Apps	(Points)
1980	New Zealand	1	(8)

Kenneth John Taylor (born 30 November 1957) is a former New Zealand rugby union player. He was successful at provincial level for Hawke's Bay and in the New Zealand Colts team, but only played a single non-test match for the All Blacks.

== Career ==
Taylor was born in Napier and brought up in central Hawke's Bay where he attended Central Hawke's Bay College. He was first selected at provincial level in 1977 and scored a try against the British Lions in his first season. The following year he was selected for the New Zealand Colts (U21) who made a domestic tour. Taylor scored three tries in five matches. He was a Junior All Black (U23) in 1979 and 1980, scoring a total of 10 tries in 10 matches. He worked for his family sawmill business, Waipawa Timber Supplies for 30 years, which was sold in 2013 but he continues to work there.

=== Waipawa United ===
Taylor started his rugby career at the small club in his home town of Waipawa. He played for almost 20 years as a player and a coach, He played alongside many great players of the club and many great Hawkes bay representatives. In 2001 Taylor attended the 75th jubilee for Waipawa United.

=== All Black ===
On 13 September 1980, a New Zealand XV played Fiji. The game was not a test match but the squad were all accredited All Black caps. Selection was restricted to players who had not appeared in the season's earlier tests against Australia and France. Taylor score two tries on the wing before being injured with 14 minutes remaining and replaced by Craig Wickes. This was his only appearance for his country due to injuries.

Taylor continued playing for Hawke's Bay until 1985, when an injury ended his career mid-season. He played a total of 65 games for the Bay, scoring 25 tries.
