= Ōtorohanga College =

State secondary school in New Zealand

Location
- Bledisloe Avenue, Ōtorohanga; 38.1788°S 175.2051°E

Information
- Type: State coeducational, secondary (Year 9–15) with Monday–Friday boarding facilities
- Motto: Honour before honours (Ko te mana mō mua i te whakamana)
- Established: 1895
- Ministry of Education Institution no.: 157
- Headmistress: Lyndsay Kurth
- Enrolment: 370
- Socio-economic decile: 4K
- Website: otocoll.school.nz

Ōtorohanga College is a coeducational state secondary school in Ōtorohanga, New Zealand. It was established as Otorohanga District High School in 1895. The school includes a Monday-to-Friday boarding hostel, Falloon House, opened in 1975, for students from outlying areas who return home each weekend.

== History ==
=== Acknowledgment of Land Wars ===
In 2015, select Ōtorohanga College students were among the hundreds who met at parliament to push for a day to remember the Land Wars (New Zealand's Civil War of the mid 1840s to early 1870s.) Among the Ōtorohanga College students was year 13 Leah Bell, who stated to Stuff, "We decided that it was our responsibility now to take action and be proactive about our history. We petitioned absolutely everywhere and we've ended up with almost 13,000 signatures. ...I guess we're also proud of New Zealand and of who we are – that we will pull together and support each other in this way."

=== COVID-19 pandemic ===
On 9 November 2020, Ōtorohanga College closed down its hostel after health authorities confirmed that a positive COVID-19 case had visited the facility while travelling from Wellington to Ōtorohanga and Kawhia.

== Enrolment ==
As of July 2026, Ōtorohanga College has a roll of 370 students, of which 172 (46.5%) identify as Māori.

As of 2026, the school has an Equity Index of 515, placing it amongst schools whose students have many socioeconomic barriers to achievement (roughly equivalent to deciles 2 and 3 under the former socio-economic decile system).

== Notable alumni ==
- Phil Amos, politician
- Kevin Eveleigh, rugby union player
- Koro Wētere, politician
- Toby Arnold, rugby player
- Jackson Willison, rugby union player
