= Kevin Eveleigh =

- Born: Kevin Alfred Eveleigh; 8 November 1947 (age 79) Palmerston North, New Zealand
- Height: 1.83 m (6 ft 0 in)
- Weight: 89 kg (196 lb)
- School: Otorohanga College
- Occupation: Farmer

Rugby union career
- Position: Flanker
Provincial / State sides
Years	Team	Apps	(Points)
1969–78	Manawatu	107	
1981–82	Bay of Plenty		
International career
Years	Team	Apps	(Points)
1974–77	New Zealand	4	(0)
1979–80	Rhodesia	25	
Coaching career
- Years: Team
- 1987: Manawatu

Kevin Alfred Eveleigh (born 8 November 1947) is a former New Zealand rugby union player. A flanker, Eveleigh represented Manawatu and Bay of Plenty at a provincial level, and was a member of the New Zealand national side, the All Blacks, from 1974 to 1977. He played 30 matches for the All Blacks including four internationals. He later captained Rhodesia between 1979 and 1980, and was the coach of Manawatu in 1987. In 1988, he was one of the first two "celebrity entries"—alongside Brian Ford—at the annual Coast to Coast adventure race.
