= Paddy McMinn =

New Zealand rugby union player (1874–1947)

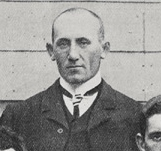
- Born: Francis Alexander McMinn; 10 November 1874 Turakina, New Zealand
- Died: 8 August 1947 (aged 72) Auckland, New Zealand
- Notable relative: Archie McMinn (brother)
- Occupation: Bricklayer

Rugby union career
- Position: Hooker
Provincial / State sides
Years	Team	Apps	(Points)
1895–99, 1903–08	Manawatu		
-	Hawke's Bay		
-	Wellington		
International career
Years	Team	Apps	(Points)
1904	New Zealand	1	(0)

Francis Alexander McMinn (10 November 1874 – 8 August 1947), usually known as Alex or Paddy McMinn was a New Zealand rugby union player. Playing most of his rugby at hooker, McMinn represented Manawatu, Hawke's Bay and Wellington at a provincial level. He was a member of the New Zealand national side, the All Blacks, in 1904, appearing in a single test match against the touring British Isles team. He was the son of Irish journalist Alexander McMinn, who established the Manawatu Evening Standard newspaper in 1880.
