= Alphonsus Carroll =

NZ dual-code rugby player (1895–1974)

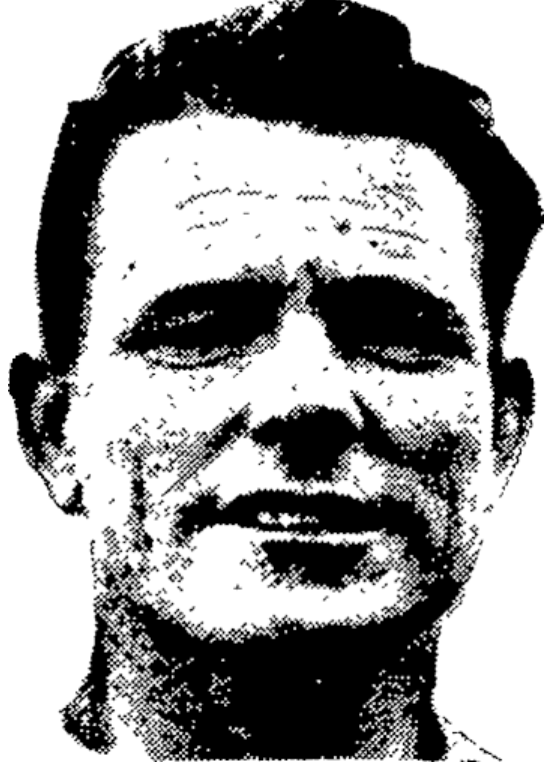
- Carroll in 1926

Personal information
- Full name: Alphonsus John Carroll
- Born: 20 April 1895; Mataura, New Zealand
- Died: 1 December 1974 (aged 79); Palmerston North, New Zealand

Playing information
- Height: 173 cm (5 ft 8 in)
- Weight: 89 kg (14 st 0 lb)

Rugby union
- Position: Hooker, Prop
Club
Years	Team	Pld	T	G	FG	P
1919	Rangiotu
1920	Pirates
1921–22	Jackeytown
1923–24	Old Boys
	Total	0	0	0	0	0
Representative
Years	Team	Pld	T	G	FG	P
1919–1924	Manawatu	37	9	1	0	29
1919–21	North Island	3	0	0	0	0
1920–21	New Zealand	8	3	2	0	13
1921	New Zealand Possibles	1	1	0	0	3
1921–24	Manawatu-Horowhenua	4	1	0	0	3
1921	New Zealand XV	1	0	0	0	0
1922	Manawatu-Wellington	1	0	0	0	0
1924	Central N. Island	1	0	0	0	0

Rugby league
- Position: Hooker, Prop
Club
Years	Team	Pld	T	G	FG	P
1925–26	Newtown (WRL)	7	6	0	0	18
Representative
Years	Team	Pld	T	G	FG	P
1924	Manawatu	1	0	0	0	3
1925–26	Wellington A	3	0	0	0	0
1925	Wellington	1	0	0	0	0
1925	North Island	1	0	0	0	0
1925–27	New Zealand	26 (2)	5 (0)	0	0	15 (0)
1925	New Zealand XIII	1	0	0	0	0

Alphonsus "Fonse" John Carroll (20 April 1895 in Mataura – 1 December 1974 in Palmerston North) was a New Zealand dual-code international rugby union and rugby league footballer who played in the 1920s, who represented New Zealand in both codes. He played at both Prop and Hooker.

== Early years ==
Carroll was born in Mataura, on 20 April 1895, before moving to the Manawatu with his family. He was the youngest of five brothers who represented Manawatu in rugby union. Carroll was a conscientious objector during World War I. In his early years Carroll was a race horse trainer, however one of his best horses broke down following the New Zealand Grand National in 1916.

== Rugby union career ==
Carroll began playing rugby union aged 22 in 1917 for the Jackeytown club and first represented Manawatu in 1919. Carroll was also selected for the North Island in 1919.

Carroll played in 8 games for the All Blacks, being a part of the 1920 tour of Australia, but never played in a Test match. Carroll scored 3 tries and 2 conversions for the All Blacks, totaling 13 points. He played for the combined Manawatu-Horowhenua team against the touring South African side in 1921. Carroll continued to play for Manawatu until 1924.

== Rugby league career ==
On September 13, just 2 weeks after playing in Manawatu's first ever Ranfurly Shield Challenge against Hawke's Bay Carroll switched codes and played for Manawatu against Wellington at Foxton. Carroll scored a try in the match which was drawn 14-14. Interviewed after the game he said "there was no loafing in the lineout, but one had to be going all the time" and "intimated the code had come to stay in Manawatu so far as he was concerned".

In 1925, Carroll 'moved' to Wellington, representing the province. Carroll was in fact driving to Wellington from Palmerston North each weekend to play for Newtown. During the season he was selected to play for the North Island team against the South Island. The North won 27–9 in front of 4,000 at Carlaw Park. From this match he was selected to play for New Zealand on their tour of Australia where he played 9 matches and scored 2 tries. His one and only match for the full Wellington side (he played in 3 trial matches across his 2 seasons), was against Auckland B at Newtown Park. Wellington were thrashed 68 to 9.

Carroll played in two Tests for the New Zealand Kiwis, touring Australia in 1926 and being part of the 1926–27 tour of Great Britain where he played against England at Central Park, Wigan on 2 October 1926. The tour was marred by strike action by the forwards and Carroll was one of the seven players sent home. As a result, he was banned for life by the New Zealand Rugby League – a ban which was lifted in 1962.

== Later years ==
Carroll attempted to return to rugby union but his application was refused by the New Zealand Rugby Union in 1930. He participated in some "low level" coaching and was eventually reinstated in 1967, at the time of the NZRFU's 75th jubilee.

Carroll owned a dairy farm in and was an active member of the Labour Party. His farm was the venue for the local Snake Valley cricket team for 40 years.

Two of Carroll's sons, Joe and Jim, represented Manawatu between 1965–68 and 1972–83 respectively.
