= Graham Hamer =

- Born: Graham Edward Hamer; 9 November 1936 (age 90) Auckland, New Zealand
- School: Mount Albert Grammar School

Rugby union career
- Position: Number 8
Amateur team(s)
Years	Team	Apps	(Points)
1947–64	Eden RFC		
Coaching career
- Years: Team
- 1971–1974: Kia Toa
- 1975–86: Manawatu

Graham Edward Hamer (born 9 November 1936) is a former New Zealand rugby union coach.

Hamer started his senior coaching career with the Kia Toa club in 1971.

He then notably coached the Manawatu provincial side to their only Ranfurly Shield reign (between 1976 and 1978) as well as winning the only first division in the union's history (1980).

A trophy dedicated to Hamer, the Graham Hamer Trophy, is competed for at the Central Region sevens annually.

Teams coached by Graham Hamer won the National Sevens 3 years in a row 1977 1978 1979 and represented New Zealand at the Hong Kong sevens each time.
