= John Buxton (rugby union) =

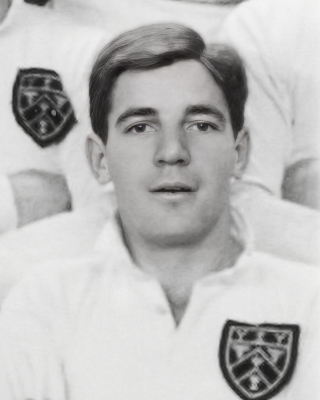
- Buxton in 1956
- Born: John Burns Buxton; 31 October 1933 Auckland, New Zealand
- Died: 3 October 2007 (aged 73) Auckland, New Zealand
- Height: 1.85 m (6 ft 1 in)
- Weight: 87 kg (192 lb)
- School: Takapuna Grammar School
- University: Canterbury Agricultural College

Rugby union career
- Position: Flanker
Provincial / State sides
Years	Team	Apps	(Points)
1954	Manawatu		
1955–56	Canterbury		
1957	Otago	9	
1958	Auckland	11	
International career
Years	Team	Apps	(Points)
1955–56	New Zealand	2	(0)

John Burns Buxton (31 October 1933 – 3 October 2007) was a New Zealand rugby union player. A flanker, Buxton represented Manawatu, Canterbury, Otago and Auckland at a provincial level, and was a member of the New Zealand national side, the All Blacks, in 1955 and 1956. He played two games for the All Blacks, both of them test matches. He died on 3 October 2007, at age 73.
