= Kia Toa RFC =

New Zealand rugby union club, based in Palmerston North

Kia Toa
Club information
- Full name: Kia Toa Rugby Football Club
- Colours: Dark Blue, Light blue
- Founded: 1902
- Website: www.sporty.co.nz/kiatoarfcsnr

Current details
- Ground: Bill Brown Park. Havelock Ave
- Competition: Hankins Shield

Kia Toa RFC is a constituent club in the Manawatu province for rugby in New Zealand. It is at the Palmerston North Bowling Club on Linton Street and is one of the oldest clubs in the Manawatu.

Kia Toa is a Māori term, which can be translated as "Be Brave".

Due to the colours of the jersey, a dark blue and light blue combination, Kia Toa are known sometimes as "The Double Blues."

== History ==
The club was founded in 1902 and is the oldest Town based club in the Manawatu. Eight of its senior players have worn the All Blacks jersey, six women players have worn the Black Ferns jersey. Additionally, there have been members who have worn the New Zealand colours in Sevens, Maori All Blacks, New Zealand U-20s, and New Zealand Divisional XV, and hundreds who have worn the green and white representative colours.

The club is currently based out of the Manawatu Bowling Club at 24 Linton Street, Palmerston North.

== Hankins Shield ==
- 2026 Winners
- 2025 Runner Up
- 2024 Winners
- 2017 Runner Up
- 2016 Runner Up
- 2015 Runner Up
- 2014 Runner Up
- 2013 Winners
- 2010 Winners
- 2009 Winners

== Notable people ==
- Sione Asi, Manawatu Turbos
- Kurt Baker, Manawatu Turbos, Taranaki, All Blacks Sevens
- Christian Cullen, All Black no. 952
- Scott Curry, Manawatu Turbo, All Black Sevens Captain
- Jason Emery, Maori All Blacks, Sunwolves, Highlanders, Manawatu Turbos, New Zealand Under 20s, New Zealand Secondary Schools.
- Ma'afu Fia, Ospreys, Highlanders, Manawatu Turbo
- Jackson Hemopo, Maori All Black, Highlanders, Manawatu Turbos
- Brayden Iose, Hurricanes, Manawatu Turbos, New Zealand Secondary Schools Captain
- Ngani Laumape, All Black no. 1160, Hurricanes, Manawatu Turbos, New Zealand Warriors 2013-2015
- Lifeimi Mafi, Manawatu Turbos, Munster Rugby
- Valentino Mapapalangi, Tonga, Leicester Tigers, Manawatu Turbos
- Farah Palmer, New Zealand Black Ferns captain, IRB Hall Of Fame, First Woman on the Board of New Zealand Rugby, International Women's Personality of the Year
- Lote Raikabula, New Zealand Sevens, Manawatu Turbos
- Stuart Ross, Manawatu Rugby Legend
- Jade Te Rure, Manawatu Turbos, New Zealand under 20s
- Dan Ward-Smith, London Wasps
- Selica Winiata, New Zealand Black Ferns, New Zealand Womans Sevens, New Zealand Rugby women's player of the year 2016

Overseas players

- Tudor Constantin, former Romanian international
