= Jason O'Halloran =

New Zealand rugby union coach

- Born: Jason David O'Halloran; 28 February 1972 (age 54) Lower Hutt, New Zealand
- Height: 1.84 m (6 ft 1/2 in)
- Weight: 89 kg (196 lb)
- School: Hutt Valley High School

Rugby union career
- Position: Centre
Senior career
Years	Team	Apps	(Points)
2002–04	Kubota Spears		
Provincial / State sides
Years	Team	Apps	(Points)
1993–01	Wellington	95	(175)
Super Rugby
Years	Team	Apps	(Points)
1996–01	Hurricanes	54	(85)
International career
Years	Team	Apps	(Points)
2000	New Zealand	1	(0)
Coaching career
- Years: Team
- 2005–06: Kubota Spears
- 2011–15: Manawatu
- 2015–17: Scotland (Asst.)
- 2017–20: Glasgow Warriors (Asst.)
- 2020–23: Suntory Sungoliath (Asst.)
- 2023–: Blues (Asst.)

Jason David O'Halloran (born 28 February 1972 in Lower Hutt, New Zealand) is an All Black cap and rugby union coach. He is currently an Assistant Coach to Vern Cotter at the Blues.

He was previously an assistant coach at Suntory Sungoliath and was the assistant coach at Glasgow Warriors. Before that he was an assistant coach to the Scotland national team.

He was the head coach of Manawatu's provincial rugby union side in New Zealand. He has previously been the head coach of rugby union Top League side, the Kubota Spears. O'Halloran had played 95 games and scored 35 tries for Wellington between 1993 and 2001 and 54 games with 17 tries for the Hurricanes at Super 12 level from the inaugural 1996 season. He was also often the Wellington and Hurricanes captain. He had international experience as well after he received his first and only All Black cap when he went on for the final few minutes of the international against Italy late in the 2000 season.

O'Halloran is the grandson of Con O'Halloran, who played for Wellington in the 1930s and was a product of the Petone club, who Jason also played for.

== Playing career ==
=== Early career: 1987–91 ===
O'Halloran first represented New Zealand, while he was a pupil at Hutt Valley High School, when selected for the New Zealand Under 17 team in 1988 and 1989. He then vice-captained the Under 19 team in 1991, before making his first appearance for Wellington in 1993. Previous representative honours included North Island Under 16.

=== Domestic career: 1993–01 ===
Despite being an insulin-dependent diabetic, O'Halloran performed with distinction in 95 games for Wellington between 1993 and 2001 and in 54 games for the Hurricanes between 1996–2001. A perceptive playmaker and astute tactician, O’Halloran was often the unsung hero in a backline glittering with big-name stars, with his 35 tries for Wellington and 17 for the Hurricanes all scored from the midfield testament to his ability. This included a hat trick against the Blues in 1998.

O’Halloran was also a try scorer for Wellington in their 2000 NPC final win over Canterbury. That was the highlight of his career and earned him at 28 overdue All Black recognition.

=== International career: 1998–00 ===
Additionally he was an All Black trialist in 1998 and later that year played for New Zealand A against England and then as captain against Tonga and Samoa.

O'Halloran received his All Black cap when he went on for the final few minutes of the international against Italy in late 2000. New Zealand won 56–19.

For until then there seemed every chance that the only other All Black appearance O'Halloran had made, on the way to Europe against the Asian Barbarians, would not entitle him to official recognition as a New Zealand representative. Because of replacement breaches by both sides this game was ruled null and void as a first class fixture. And subsequently when the All Black touring party reached Europe for internationals against France and Italy O'Halloran had to drop out for the first week or so because of a family bereavement. But fortunately he returned in time to be included for the 22-man squad against Italy.

=== Japanese career: 2002–04 ===
At the end of the 2001 season O’Halloran took up a three-year playing contract in Japan with the Kubota Spears between 2002 and 2004.

== Coaching career ==
In October 2007 he was appointed High Performance Academy Manager by the Manawatu Rugby Union, having spent the previous two seasons coaching at Japanese club, Kubota. In 2009 he was selected as a co-coach for the Hurricanes Secondary Schools team that retained the National Secondary Schools title.

In October 2011 he was appointed as Head Coach of the Manawatu Turbos ITM Cup team, succeeding Dave Rennie who moved to the Chiefs.

=== Scotland ===
In May 2015, it was announced by Vern Cotter that O'Halloran was to be a backline for the Scottish team for the 2015 RWC.

=== Glasgow Warriors ===
In October 2016 it was announced that O'Halloran would be an assistant coach for Glasgow Warriors. O'Halloran would take on this role in May 2017.

He left Glasgow Warriors in 2020, having taken them to a Pro14 final in 2019 with Dave Rennie. On leaving the club, O'Halloran said "Scotstoun is a very special place and I am proud to have worked with so many excellent players, who care so much for the club."

=== Suntory Goliath ===
It was announced that O'Halloran would join Suntory Goliath as Assistant Coach on 10 June 2020. O'Halloran stated: "Suntory have a reputation for playing a fast paced, attacking brand of rugby and this fits nicely with my own personal philosophy toward the game."

=== Blues ===
In July 2023 it was announced that O'Halloran was signed on for two years as Assistant Coach to Vern Cotter, the new Head Coach of the Blues.

In February 2024 O'Halloran took medical leave from the Blues role to work through personal medical issues related to his diabetes. The club website stated Jason had no set return date and in his absence Tony Brown would step in on a short-term coaching consultant role.
