= 1989 Scotland rugby union tour of Japan =

Summary
P	W	D	L
Total
5	4	0	1
Test match
1	0	0	1
Opponent
P	W	D	L
Japan
1	0	0	1

The 1989 Scotland rugby union tour of Japan was a series of matches played in May 1989 in Japan by Scotland national rugby union team.

== Results ==
Scores and results list Scotland's points tally first.

Opponent	For	Against	Date	Venue	Status
Kanto	91	8	14 May 1989	Tokyo	Tour match
Kyushu	45	0	17 May 1989	Fukuoka	Tour match
Japan U.23	51	25	21 May 1989	Osaka	Tour match
Kansai	39	12	24 May 1989	Nagoya	Tour match
Japan	24	28	28 May 1989	Chichibu, Tokyo	Tour match
