= Shinnosuke Kakinaga =

Japan international rugby union player

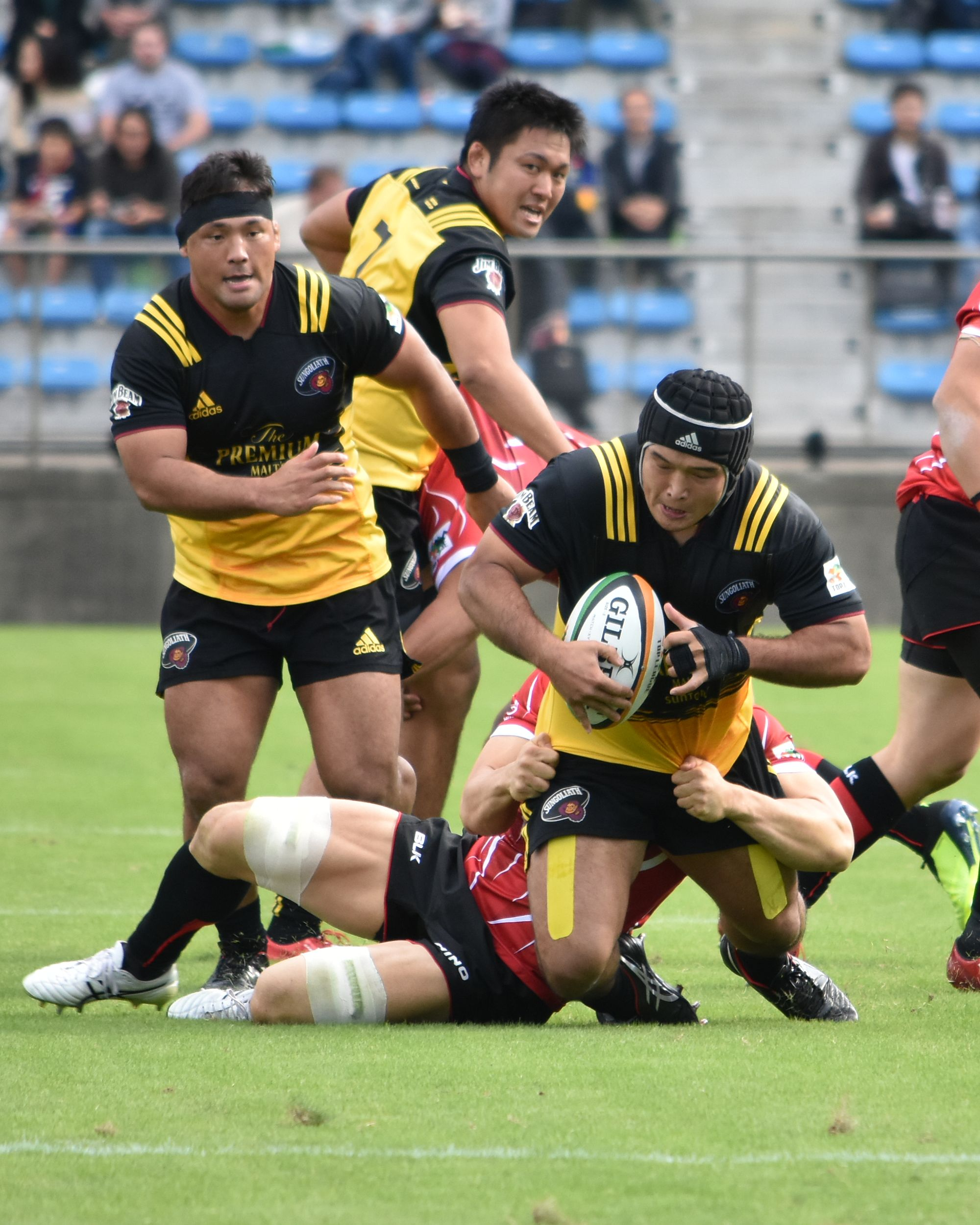
- Kakinaga representing Tokyo Sungoliath during the Top League
- Born: 19 December 1991 (age 34) Fukuoka, Japan
- Height: 1.80 m (5 ft 11 in)
- Weight: 118 kg (260 lb; 18 st 8 lb)
- School: Higashi Fukuoka High School
- University: Waseda University

Rugby union career
- Position: Prop
Senior career
Years	Team	Apps	(Points)
2014–2026	Suntory Sungoliath	126	(45)
2016	Sunwolves	15	(0)
- Correct as of 28 August 2023
International career
Years	Team	Apps	(Points)
2014–2023	Japan	12	(0)
2023	Japan XV	2	(0)
- Correct as of 28 August 2023

Shinnosuke Kakinaga (垣永 真之介, Kakinaga Shinnosuke; born 19 December 1991) is a Japanese professional rugby union player who plays as a prop for Japan Rugby League One club Tokyo Sungoliath and the Japan national team.

== Club career ==
In his home country he plays for Suntory Sungoliath whom he joined in 2014. He was also named in the first ever Sunwolves squad which will compete in Super Rugby from the 2016 season.

== International career ==
Kakinaga is a Japanese international who debuted against Georgia in 2014, however he did not make the squad for the 2015 Rugby World Cup.
