= Jack Finlay (rugby union) =

NZ international rugby union player

Jack Finlay MC
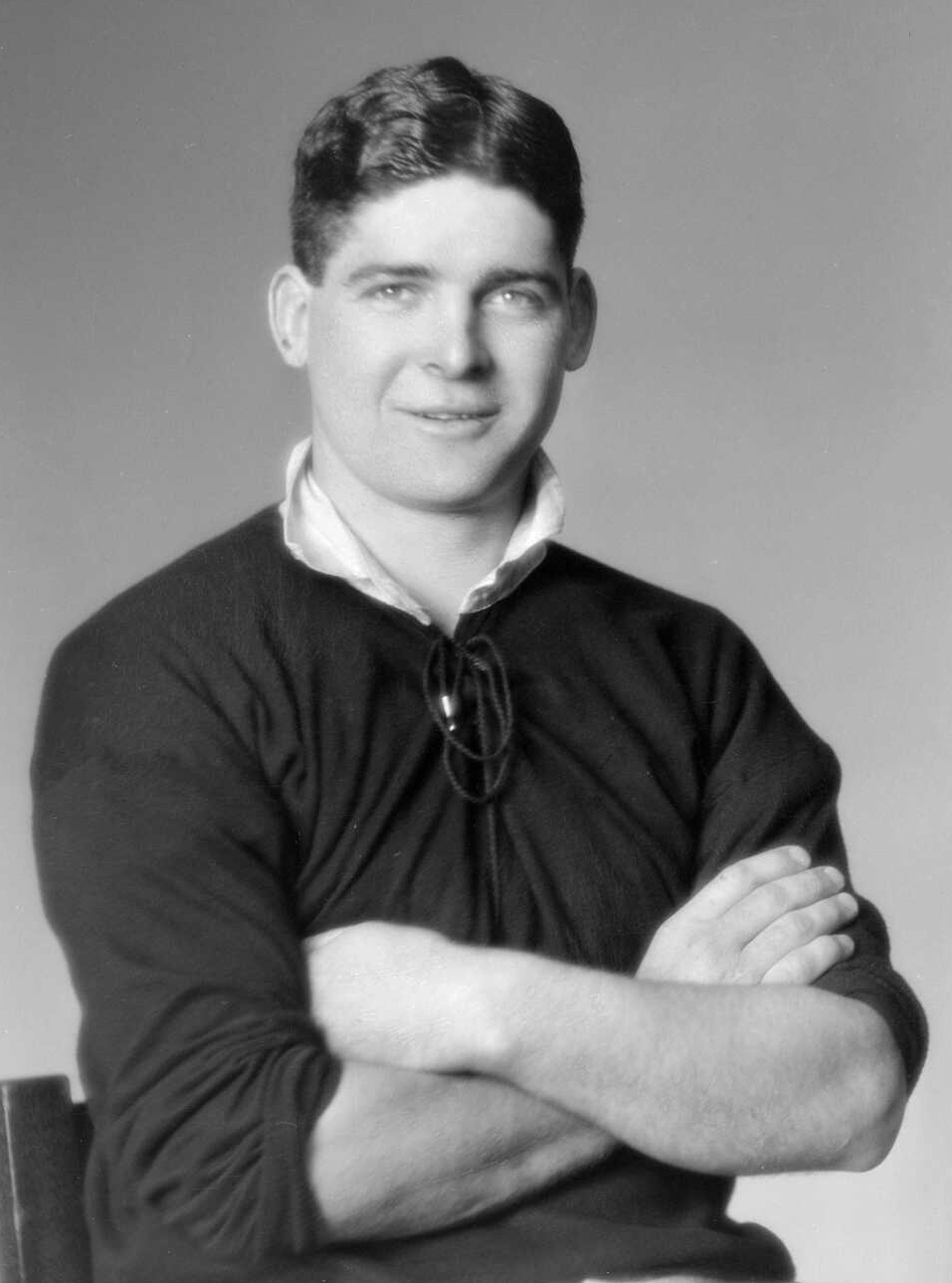
- Born: 31 January 1916 Normanby, New Zealand
- Died: 30 June 2001 (aged 85) Feilding, New Zealand
- Height: 1.78 m (5 ft 10 in)
- Weight: 86 kg (190 lb)
- School: Feilding Agricultural High School
- Notable relative: Brian Finlay (cousin)
- Occupation: Grain buyer

Rugby union career
- Position: Number 8
Provincial / State sides
Years	Team	Apps	(Points)
1934–39	Manawatu	59	
International career
Years	Team	Apps	(Points)
1946	New Zealand	1	(3)
Coaching career
- Years: Team
- 1964: New Zealand Colts

Jack Finlay MC (31 January 1916 – 30 June 2001) was a New Zealand rugby union player. A versatile player, Finlay turned out in the forwards for his club but usually as a first or second five eighth at provincial level for Manawatu. He played just one match for the New Zealand national side, the All Blacks, as a Number 8 in the first test against the touring Australian team at Carisbrook in 1946, in which he scored a try.

During World War II, Finlay was commissioned as a second lieutenant in the New Zealand Army infantry in August 1940, and rose to the rank of major. He captained army rugby teams in Italy and North Africa. Finlay was awarded the Military Cross in relation to operations in Italy in the first three months of 1945. After the end of the war, Finlay toured Britain and Europe with the 2nd New Zealand Expeditionary Force rugby team, known as the "Kiwis" in 1945–46 as its vice-captain, appearing in 23 of the 38 games played, including against England, Scotland and Wales.

Finlay later became a selector, with Manawatu in 1949, the North Island side from 1949 to 1963, and the All Blacks between 1961 and 1963. He coached the 1964 New Zealand Colts team on their 1964 tour of Australia. He died in Feilding on 30 June 2001, and was buried at Feilding Cemetery.
