= Alexander McMinn =

New Zealand teacher, journalist, newspaper proprietor (1842–1919)

Alexander McMinn (28 August 1842 – 21 October 1919) was a New Zealand teacher, journalist and newspaper proprietor. He was born in Dunlady, County Down, Ireland on 28 August 1842.
