= Perry Harris =

New Zealand rugby union player (1946–2021)

- Born: Perry Colin Harris; 11 January 1946 Feilding, New Zealand
- Died: 8 August 2021 (aged 75) Papamoa, New Zealand
- Height: 1.85 m (6 ft 1 in)
- Weight: 101 kg (223 lb)
- School: Feilding Agricultural High School
- Notable relative: Nathan Harris (first cousin twice removed)

Rugby union career
- Position: Prop
Provincial / State sides
Years	Team	Apps	(Points)
1970–78	Manawatu	106	
International career
Years	Team	Apps	(Points)
1976	New Zealand	1	(0)

Perry Colin Harris (11 January 1946 – 8 August 2021) was a New Zealand rugby union player. A prop, Harris represented Manawatu at a provincial level, and was called into the New Zealand national side, the All Blacks, as a replacement on their 1976 tour of South Africa. He played four matches for the All Blacks including one international.

Harris died in Papamoa on 8 August 2021, aged 75.
