= John Mowlem (rugby union) =

- Born: 9 August 1870 Wainuiomata, New Zealand
- Died: 12 October 1951 (aged 81) Tauranga, New Zealand

Rugby union career
- Position: Forward
Provincial / State sides
Years	Team	Apps	(Points)
1890–93	Manawatu	13	
1894	Wairarapa	4	
International career
Years	Team	Apps	(Points)
1893	New Zealand	0	(0)

John Mowlem (9 August 1870 – 12 October 1951) was a New Zealand rugby union player. A forward, Mowlem thirteen times represented Manawatu at a provincial level, and after transfer to Greytown he played four matches for Wairarapa. He was a member of the New Zealand national side, the All Blacks, on the 1893 tour to Australia. He played four matches for the All Blacks, but did not play in an international.
