= Vern Cotter =

NZ rugby union player & coach

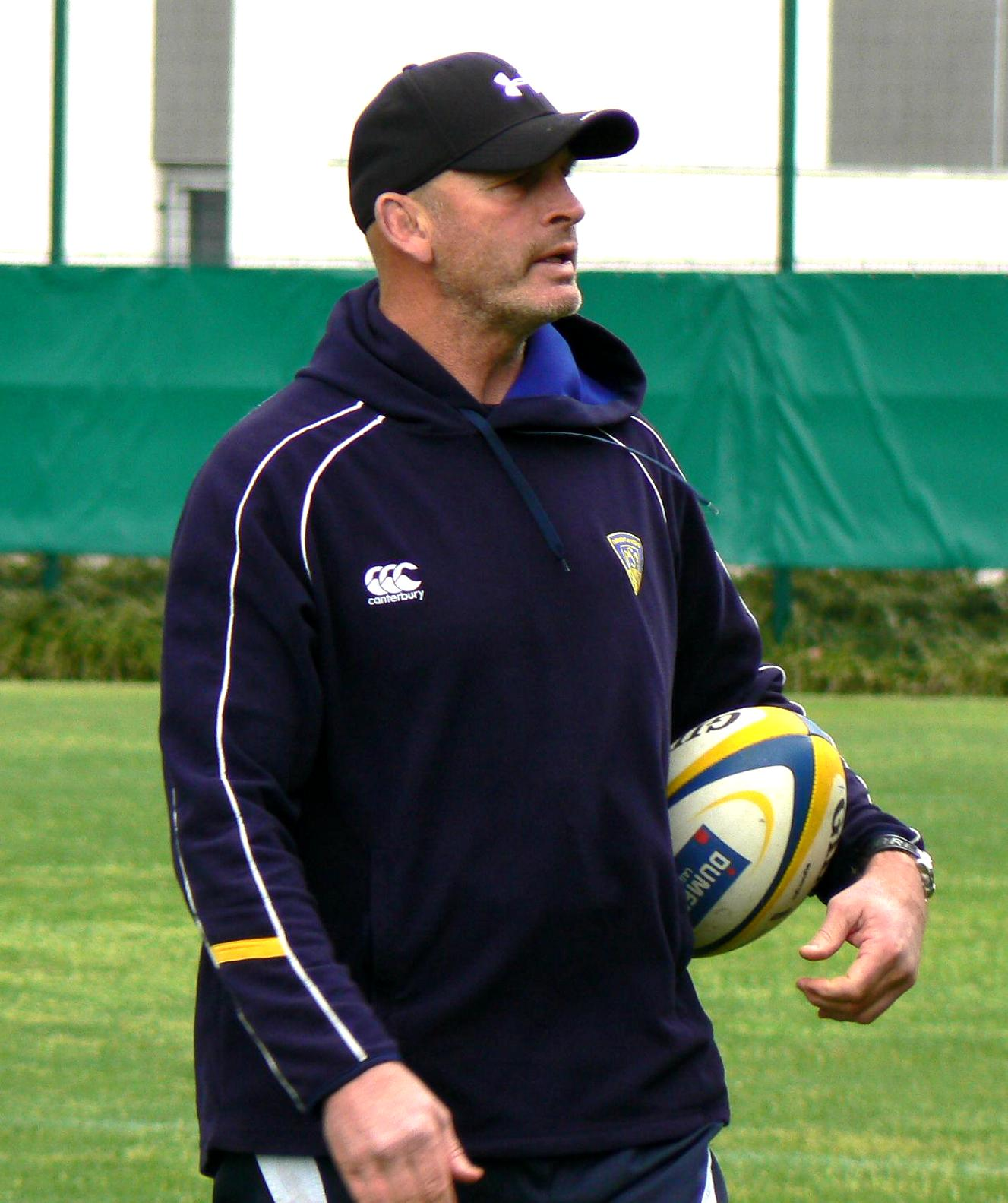
- Cotter in 2010
- Born: Vernon Anthony Cotter; 27 January 1962 (age 64) Auckland, New Zealand
- Height: 1.91 m (6 ft 3 in)
- Weight: 115 kg (254 lb)
- Notable relative: Jeremy Cotter (brother)
- Occupation: Rugby Coach

Rugby union career
- Position: No. 8
Provincial / State sides
Years	Team	Apps	(Points)
1986, 1989–1990	Counties	15	(8)
1987, 1992	Bay of Plenty	12	(18)
1990–1994	Rumilly		
1994–1996	FC Lourdes		
1996–1997	Saint-Junien		
1997–1998	FC Lourdes		
1998–1999	U.S. Castelnau-Madiran		
Coaching career
- Years: Team
- 2000–2004: Bay of Plenty
- 2005–2006: Crusaders (Forwards coach)
- 2006–2014: Clermont Auvergne
- 2014–2017: Scotland
- 2017: Barbarians
- 2017–2019: Montpellier
- 2020–2023: Fiji
- 2024–2026: Blues
- 2027–: Queensland Reds
- Correct as of 27 January 2026

Vernon Anthony Cotter (born 27 January 1962) is a New Zealand rugby union coach and former player. He currently coaches the Queensland Reds in the Super Rugby.

He started his coaching career at Bay of Plenty including winning the Ranfurly Shield for the first time in the union's history. He was part of the coaching staff for the successful Crusaders side between 2005 and 2006 winning 2 titles, before coaching in France with Clermont Auvergne between 2006 and 2014. He coached them to 6 finals and 2 titles, including their first ever bouclier du Brennus. He then coached the Scotland national team from 2014, including a quarter final at the 2015 Rugby World Cup, and left his role in May 2017 as his contract was not extended by the Scottish Rugby Union. In January 2020 Cotter was appointed coach of Fiji, but resigned in January 2023.

== Playing career ==
Cotter played representative rugby in New Zealand, for Counties in 1986, 1989 and 1990, and Bay of Plenty in 1987 and 1992. He also played for a number of clubs in France during the 1990s.

== Coaching career ==
=== Bay of Plenty ===
Cotter returned to New Zealand and became the head coach of Bay of Plenty, beginning with the 2000 National Provincial Championship. During his first year in charge, he led the side to the second division championship.

=== Crusaders ===
During the 2004 Super 12 season, Cotter was made forwards coach of the Crusaders, when the side finished runners-up to the ACT Brumbies. He continued in his post as forwards coach through the 2005 season when the Crusaders won the competition, and the side retained their title in the 2006 season.

=== Clermont ===
==== Top 14 ====
In 2006, Cotter was made Head Coach of ASM Clermont Auvergne for the 2006–07 Top 14 season when Clermont finished runners-up behind Stade Français. The following year, Cotter coached the side to 20 out of 26 victories in the regular season, finishing first in the table before the knock-out stages. However, Clermont finished second overall, losing to Toulouse in the Grand Final. For the third successive year under Cotter, Clermont lost the final in the 2008–09 Top 14 season, but did win their first title in 2009–10 after beating Perpignan in the final. In the 2010–11, 2011–12 and 2012–13 seasons Clermont were knocked out in the semi-finals. However, in Cotters final season in charge of Clermont, Clermont were knocked out in the quarter-finals, losing at home 22–16 to defending champions Castres. This loss was also Clermont's first loss at home in 77 matches, which dates back to the 16–13 loss to Biarritz in Round 13 of the 2009–10 Top 14 season.

==== Heineken Cup ====
During his first year as head coach of Clermont, Cotter was able to lead the side into the Heineken Cup, after winning all their matches in the 2006–07 European Challenge Cup. Clermont were unable to advance out of the group stages between 2007 and 2009. During the 2009–10 Heineken Cup, Clermont entered the knock-out stages of the Heineken Cup for the first time, but lost to Leinster in the quarter-finals. In the 2012–13 season, Cotter led the side to the Heineken Cup Final at the Aviva Stadium, but lost 16–15 to Toulon. During the 2013–14 Heineken Cup, Clermont finished in seed 2 after the pool stage, winning five from six matches (lost against Racing Métro, won against Harlequins home and away, Scarlets home and away, and Racing Métro at home). Cotter led Clermont to their third consecutive quarter-final, beating Leicester Tigers 22–16. However, their third consecutive semi-final ended with a record losing margin of 46–6 to Saracens at Twickenham.

=== Scotland ===
Cotter departed Clermont in May 2014, to take on the role of head coach of Scotland. He was named the coach in May 2013, but as Clermont and the SRU failed to agree to release Cotter a year earlier, Cotter remained with Clermont until the end of his contract or until Clermont was knocked out of theirs respective tournaments.

Cotter's first challenge as Scotland's head coach, was a 4-match tour across three continents over four consecutive weeks. In Cotters first match in charge, he led the team to a 24–6 win over the United States in Houston. A week later, a 19–17 win over Canada in Toronto. Cotter first major match in charge was a Friday night fixture against Argentina in Córdoba. Heading into this match, Scotland had won three connective matches against the Pumas on Argentine soil. This streak was extended following a 21–19 win over Argentina. A week later, Cotter faced his toughest challenge, an away match to the Springboks outside the International Window. This meant, Cotter could only select players that played for either Glasgow Warriors or Edinburgh. The weakened team lost 55–6 in Port Elizabeth, the biggest losing margin to South Africa on South African soil.

In Cotter's first home match at Murrayfield Stadium, Scotland won 41–31, scoring five tries against Argentina. It was the most tries they had scored against a Tier 1 nation since they scored five tries against Ireland in 2007. It was believed much of the team were based around the success of Scottish club side Glasgow Warriors, with 10 of the starting XV from the Glasgow side, with a further four players on the bench. The following fixture was a narrow 16–24 loss to New Zealand. For much of that match, Scotland had been in touching distance of a first ever victory over the All Blacks, but a late try during the 73rd minute secured the win for the No. 1 ranked side. Scotland's final fixture was against Tonga at Rugby Park in Kilmarnock. The match was the first ever match to be played on a fully artificial pitch by a Tier 1 nation approved by World Rugby. For Scotland, they won convincingly 37–12, gaining revenge following their first ever loss to Tonga in 2012.

During the 2015 Six Nations Championship, Scotland finished last place with no wins in their campaign. Most of their losses were narrow defeats, including a home loss to Italy for the first time since 2007. Though, during Scotland's Rugby World Cup warm-ups, Scotland gained revenge with a record win 48–7. Before Scotland's warm-up matches began, Cotter extended his contract with the SRU until 2017. During the 2015 Rugby World Cup, Scotland progressed from the pool stage with wins against Japan, 45–10, the United States, 39–16, and Samoa, 36–33, losing only to South Africa, 34–16. In the knockout stage they faced a highly fancied Australia team. With six minutes to go Scotland scored a try to lead against all expectations by 34–32. However, with a minute to go Australia kicked a highly controversial and disputed penalty to win the game 35–34 and end Scotland's participation in the tournament.

During the 2016 Six Nations Championship, Cotter led Scotland to their first victory over France since 2006, when they defeated the French 29–18. Scotland went on to finish 4th in the Championship, with a second win against Italy 36–20, but narrow losses to England 15–9, Wales 27–23 and Ireland 35–25 meant Scotland only finished with two wins. In June 2016, Cotter led Scotland to a 26–13 and 21–16 win over Japan to win their test series with the Brave Blossoms 2–0, winning their first test series since 2010.

In August 2016 it was announced that the Scottish Rugby Union would not be renewing Cotter's contract. The SRU Chief Executive, Mark Dodson said that "Vern Cotter has made a considerable impact on the development of the Scotland national side during his tenure. His rugby philosophy of setting high standards with a big emphasis on skill development has had a positive effect throughout Scottish rugby" and that he would continue as head coach until June 2017 after which Gregor Townsend would take over the position ahead of the June internationals. A fan petition was created by fans to #KeepVern which gained over 3000 signatures

During the 2016 Autumn Internationals, Cotter led Scotland to two victories, beating Argentina 19–16 with a last minute penalty from Greig Laidlaw, before going on to beat Georgia 43–16; this was the first time that Scotland had hosted Georgia in a test match. Scotland narrowly lost to Australia, losing 23–22, though Scotland had been leading 22–16 with 5 minutes to go in the game.

In Cotter's final campaign as Scottish Coach, Scotland had their most successful Six Nations despite finishing 4th in the table. They won all three of their home games, beating Ireland 27–22, Wales 29–13 - in what was Scotland's first win over Wales since 2007 - and Italy 29–0 - which was the first time that Scotland had not conceded any points in a test match since beating Canada 41–0 in 2008. It was also the first ever time they kept Italy pointless and in a Six Nations game. Leading into the fourth round, Scotland were still within a chance of winning the Championship, however with a loss to France in round 2 (22–16) and then England in the fourth round (61–21) Scotland could not secure the Championship. However had France and Ireland not had their respective wins in the final round, Scotland would have finished in their highest ever positioning in the Six Nations of second.

In May 2017, Cotter left his position at Scotland with a 53% win rate (19 wins from 36 games), then the most successful coach of the professional era and the most successful since Ian McGeechan between 1988 and 1993.

=== Return to France ===
On 28 September 2016, it was announced that Cotter will become head coach of Montpellier, replacing Jake White.

=== Fiji ===
In January 2020 Cotter was appointed as coach of the Fijian national rugby team.

=== Blues ===
Since 2024 Cotter has been the head coach of the Auckland-based Blues in the Super Rugby. Cotter signed a two-year deal (2024–2025) ahead of their 2024 Super Rugby Pacific season, and replaced Leon MacDonald. After successfully winning the Blues' first Super Rugby title since 2003, Cotter was rewarded with a new one-year contract extension. In 2025, Cotter's Blues just scraped into the finals, ultimately losing in the Semi-finals to the Crusaders.

=== Reds ===
In January 2026, Cotter was announced to be the new coach of the Queensland Reds on a two-year deal, starting in 2027. This ruled Cotter out of potential New Zealand coaching job, for which he was a shortlisted candidate. Cotter replaced Les Kiss whom took up national coaching duties with the Australia national team at the conclusion of the 2026 season.

== International record ==
=== Record by country ===
Record by country (head coach of Scotland, 2014–2017)
Opponent	P	W	D	L	W%	PF	PA
Argentina	3	3	0	0	100	81	66
Australia	2	0	0	2	0	56	58
Canada	1	1	0	0	100	19	17
England	3	0	0	3	0	43	101
France	4	1	0	3	25	69	74
Georgia	1	1	0	0	100	43	16
Ireland	4	1	0	3	25	84	125
Italy	5	4	0	1	80	148	61
Japan	3	3	0	0	100	92	39
New Zealand	1	0	0	1	0	16	24
South Africa	2	0	0	2	0	22	89
Samoa	1	1	0	0	100	36	33
Tonga	1	1	0	0	100	37	12
Wales	3	1	0	2	33.33	75	66
United States	2	2	0	0	100	63	22
Total	36	19	0	17	52.78	884	803

Record by country (head coach of Fiji, 2020–2023)
Opponent	P	W	D	L	W%	PF	PA
Australia A	1	0	0	1	0	18	32
Georgia	2	1	1	0	50	53	39
Ireland	1	0	0	1	0	17	35
New Zealand	2	0	0	2	0	36	117
Samoa	1	0	0	1	0	20	23
Scotland	1	0	0	1	0	12	28
Spain	1	1	0	0	100	43	13
Tonga	1	1	0	0	100	36	0
Wales	1	0	0	1	0	23	38
Total	11	3	1	7	27.27	258	325

=== Honours ===
- Douglas Horn Trophy
  - Winners: 2014
- Centenary Quaich
  - Winners: 2017

== Club honours ==
=== Clermont ===
- Top 14
  - Winners: 2009–10
  - Runners-up: 2006–07, 2007–08, 2008–09
- Heineken Cup
  - Runners-up: 2012–13
- European Challenge Cup
  - Winners: 2006–07

=== Crusaders ===
- Super Rugby
  - Winners: 2005, 2006
  - Runners-up: 2004

=== Blues ===
- Super Rugby
  - Winners: 2024

Sporting positions
Preceded by Scott Johnson (Interim)	Scotland national rugby union team coach 2014–2017	Succeeded by Gregor Townsend
Preceded by John McKee	Fiji national rugby union team coach 2020–2023	Succeeded by Simon Raiwalui
