= Marlborough wine region =

New Zealand's largest wine region

Marlborough
- Wine region
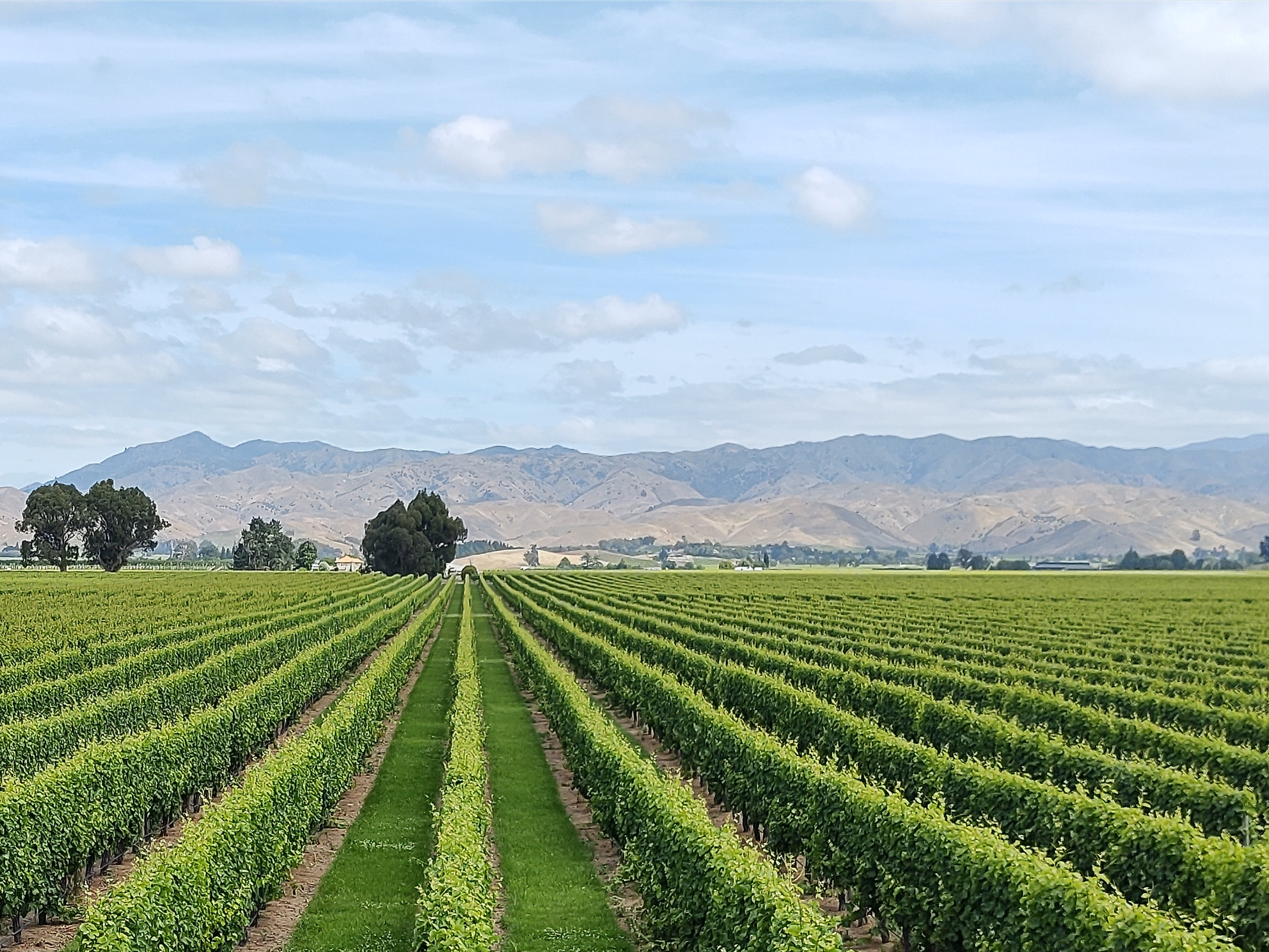
- Wairau Valley vineyards in Marlborough, New Zealand
- Type: Geographical Indication
- Year established: 1970s; GI registered in 2018
- Country: New Zealand
- Sub-regions: Awatere Valley; Southern Valleys; Wairau Valley
- Size of planted vineyards: 27,808 hectares (68,720 acres)
- Grapes produced: 343,036 tonnes
- Varietals produced: Sauvignon Blanc; Chardonnay; Pinot Noir; Pinot Gris
- No. of wineries: 158
- Comments: GI established 2018, commercial vineyards first established in 1973; data from 2020

New Zealand vineyard area by region, 2020. Marlborough accounts for about two thirds of the total vineyard area in New Zealand.
1. Marlborough (69.6%)
2. Hawke's Bay (12.6%)
3. Central Otago (4.80%)
4. North Canterbury (3.40%)
5. Gisborne (3.00%)
6. Nelson (2.80%)
7. Wairarapa (2.60%)
8. Other (1.10%)
Data from New Zealand Winegrowers annual report.

The Marlborough wine region is by far New Zealand's largest, accounting in 2020 for three quarters of the country's wine production, 70% of its vineyard area and 85% of its wine exports. It covers the entire Marlborough District and the Kaikōura District of the Canterbury Region in the north-east of the South Island, but in practice the vineyards are concentrated around the Blenheim and Seddon townships. Marlborough was registered as a Geographical Indication in 2018, and its Sauvignon Blanc is recognised as world class; wine writers such as Oz Clarke and George Taber have described it as the best in the world.

== History ==
Early settlers in Marlborough planted vines as early as the 1870s. A small block of Brown Muscat was planted in 1873 by David Herd, but in 1931 his son pulled up the last of the vines, and no others were recorded in the region for the next forty years. Commercial wine-making began in earnest only in 1973 when the first large-scale vineyards were planted by Montana Wines, at the time New Zealand's largest producer (now Brancott Estate, owned by Vinarchy). Meanwhile, in 1975 Daniel Le Brun, a Champagne maker, emigrated to New Zealand to begin producing méthode traditionelle in Marlborough.

Wineries in the Marlborough region were producing outstanding Sauvignon Blanc by the early 1980s, and in 1985 the Sauvignon Blanc from Cloudy Bay Vineyards finally garnered international attention and critical acclaim for New Zealand wine. Wine writer George Taber recounted in 2006 that Cloudy Bay is "what many people consider to be the world's best Sauvignon Blanc" and Oz Clarke wrote that New Zealand Sauvignon Blanc is "arguably the best in the world." The suitability of the region and later success of Daniel Le Brun's sparkling wines were also sufficient to attract significant investment from Champagne producers.

New Zealand vineyard area by grape variety over time (1990–2025), in hectares. The more than five-fold growth of Sauvignon Blanc plantings in the first two decades of the 21st century is evident, along with a similar rapid growth of Pinot Gris. Riesling, Merlot and Chardonnay are more or less unchanged or have declined slightly. A doubling of Pinot Noir has also occurred, and a tripling of the much smaller area of Syrah is countered by a corresponding decline in Cabernet Sauvignon.
Statistics from New Zealand Winegrowers 1998–2025 annual reports.

New Zealand's plantings of Sauvignon Blanc experienced enormous growth in the 21st century, driven almost exclusively by investment in the Marlborough region. Vineyard area of the grape expanded from 4,516 hectares (11,160 acres) in 2003 to 23,102 hectares (57,090 acres) in 2018, a five-fold increase in just 15 years.

== Climate and geography ==
Blenheim

Climate chart (precipitation, max. and min. temperature)
J	F	M	A	M	J	J	A	S	O	N	D
49 24 12	49 24 12	47 22 10	53 19 7	61 16 5	71 13 2	74 13 2	62 14 3	65 16 5	67 18 7	55 20 8	58 22 11
- █ Average max. and min. temperatures in °C
- █ Precipitation totals in mm
- Source: NIWA Climate Statistics, 1981–2010.
Imperial conversion
J	F	M	A	M	J	J	A	S	O	N	D
1.9 75 53	1.9 75 53	1.8 71 50	2.1 66 44	2.4 61 40	2.8 56 36	2.9 55 35	2.4 57 37	2.6 60 40	2.7 64 44	2.2 68 47	2.3 72 51
- █ Average max. and min. temperatures in °F
- █ Precipitation totals in inches

The soils in the Wairau Valley and the wine-growing districts surrounding Blenheim are primarily free-draining alluvial gravels. The valley is situated between the Richmond Ranges to the north and the Wither Hills to the south, which protect it from extreme weather conditions. These two factors make the valley ideal for viticulture. The climate is usually sunny and warm in summer and autumn, resulting in a long growing season, and the cool night-time sea breezes provide the temperature variation required for good characterful wines. It can also be very dry, and younger vines often require some degree of irrigation. Extensive planting has been undertaken on the river terraces and flood plains on the valley floor, although some wineries are using organic practices to also dry-farm vines on north-facing hill slopes.

== Sub-regions ==
Map of the Marlborough wine region

Although the Marlborough GI extends to the entire Marlborough and Kaikoura district boundaries, vineyards are broadly concentrated into three sub-regions.

=== Wairau Valley ===
The Wairau Valley is the flood plain and valley floor of the Wairau River, around the town of Blenheim, with deep alluvial gravel soils and river terraces.

=== Southern Valleys ===
The Southern Valleys are the north–south tributary valleys on the southern slope of the Wairau Valley. These valleys climb south into the Wither Hills, and form ideal, north-facing slopes with largely glacial loess soils.

=== Awatere Valley ===
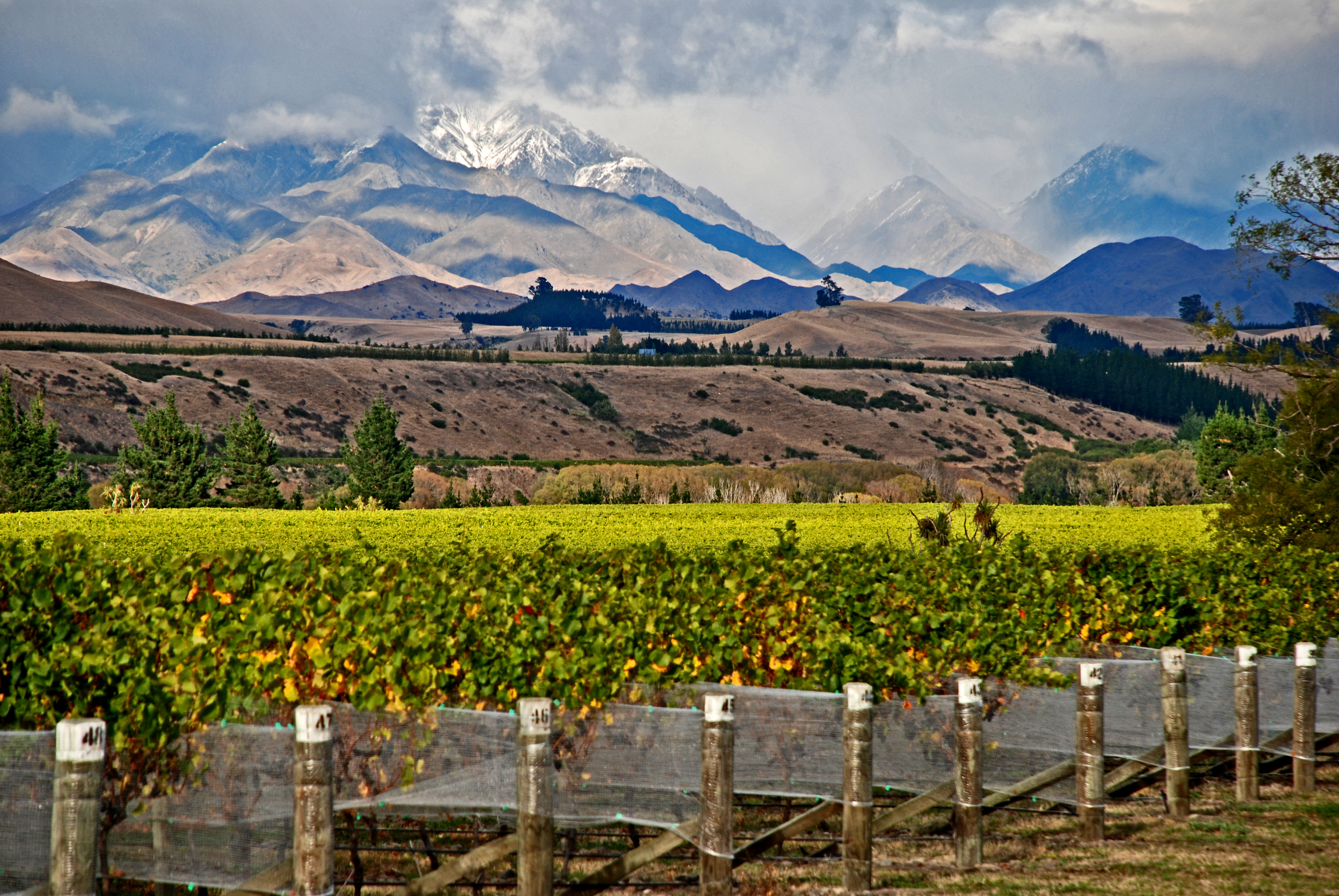
Vineyards in the Awatere Valley, looking south towards the Kaikōura Ranges

Awatere Valley is further to the south-east and south of the Wither Hills. The most recent sub-region to be substantially developed, it accounts for about a third of the total Marlborough growing area. Vineyards are concentrated in the alluvial valley floor of the Awatere River, centred around the town of Seddon. Vineyards are also planted further up the narrowing river valley floor to the southwest, and further south following State Highway 1 through to the township of Ward. This sub-region is protected from winds by both the Wither Hills and the mountains of the Inland Kaikōura Range to the south, with a generally cooler climate.

== Winemaking and regulations ==
Quality marks appearing on Marlborough wine labels: Appellation Marlborough Wine (left), and Méthode Marlborough (right).

Marlborough was established in 2018 as a New Zealand geographical indication (GI) under new legislation. In the same year, several Marlborough wineries formed an incorporated society Appellation Marlborough Wine to administer a global label trademark and a certification process to further protect the integrity and quality standards of Marlborough wines. To qualify, wines must be made entirely from sustainably grown grapes from Marlborough, comply with cropping rates set annually, and be bottled in New Zealand. Starting with the 2022 vintage, qualifying wines must also be approved by an independent tasting panel.

Marlborough also hosts significant production of méthode traditionelle sparkling wine made from Chardonnay and Pinot Noir, sufficient to attract investment from large Champagne producers Mumm, Deutz, Moët & Chandon (which now owns Cloudy Bay) and Veuve Clicquot. In 2013 several Marlborough producers established Méthode Marlborough, a collaborative organisation to set quality standards and promote the brand both domestically and internationally. Méthode Marlborough wines must be produced entirely in Marlborough using the traditional method of production from only Marlborough-grown Pinot Noir, Chardonnay and Pinot Meunier, and aged on lees for a minimum of 18 months.
