= New Zealand wine =

Wine making in New Zealand

New Zealand
- Wine region
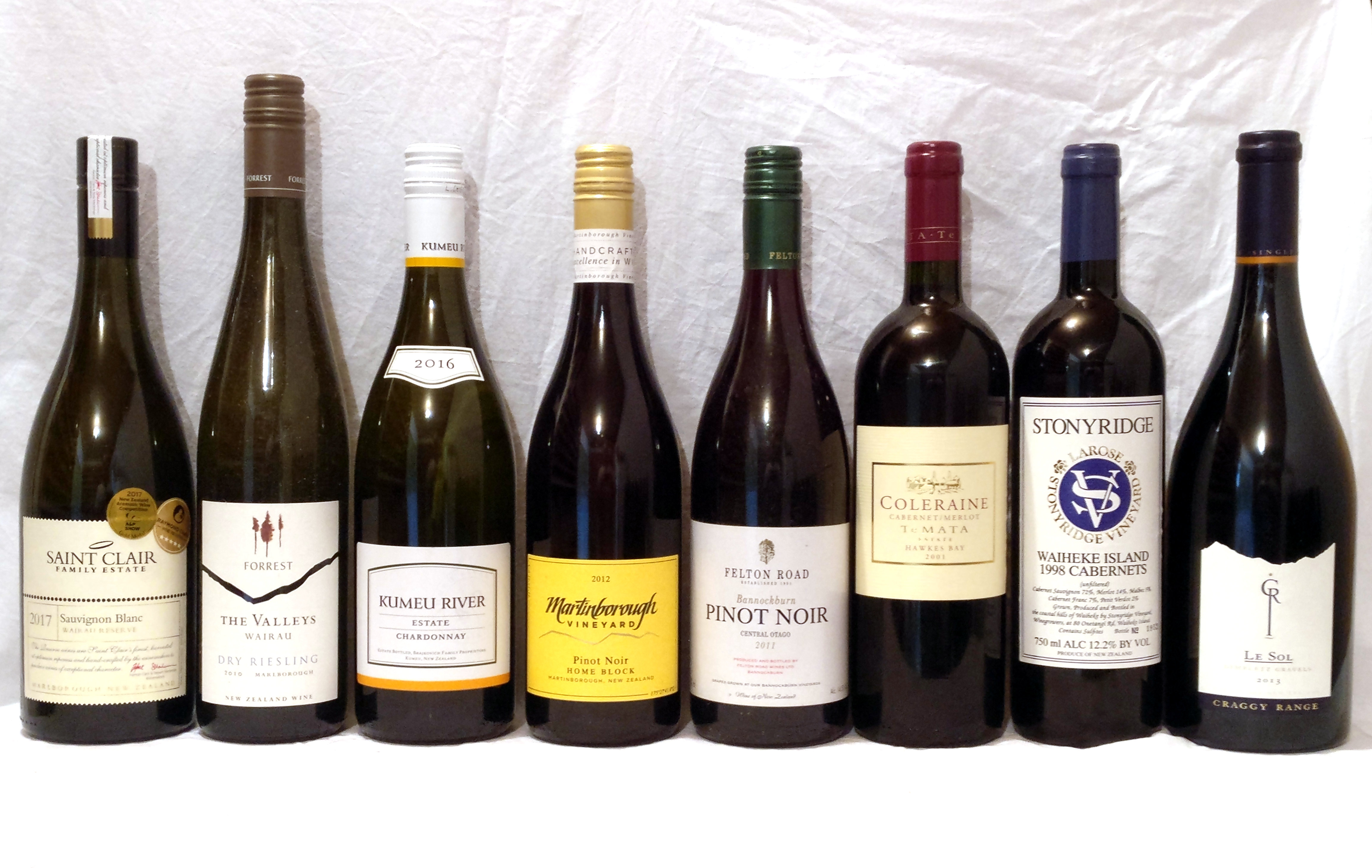
- A selection of New Zealand wines
- Type: Geographical indication
- Year established: 2017
- Country: New Zealand
- Sub-regions: Marlborough; Hawke's Bay; Central Otago; Waipara; Gisborne; (more)
- Growing season: October–April
- Climate region: Ia–III, mainly II; Maritime climate
- Heat units: 805–1606 °C
- Precipitation (annual average): 300–1500 mm (12–59 in)
- Size of planted vineyards: 39,935 hectares (98,680 acres)
- No. of vineyards: 2023
- Grapes produced: 457,000 tonnes
- Varietals produced: Sauvignon Blanc; Pinot Noir; Chardonnay; Pinot Gris; Merlot; Riesling; Syrah
- Wine produced: 3.29 million hectolitres (87 million US gallons)
- Comments: Data from 2020

New Zealand wine is produced in several of its distinct winegrowing regions. (Note: If New Zealand as a whole is taken to be a wine region then the various 'regions' may be regarded as sub-regions.) As an island country in the South Pacific Ocean, New Zealand has a largely maritime climate, although its elongated geography produces considerable regional variation from north to south. Like many other New World wines, New Zealand wine is usually produced and labelled as single varietal wines, or if blended, winemakers list the varietal components on the label. New Zealand is best known for its Marlborough Sauvignon Blanc, and more recently for premium cool-climate Pinot Noir from Marlborough, Martinborough, Central Otago and the limestone-rich Waitaki Valley.

While New Zealand wine traces its history to the early 19th century, the modern wine industry in New Zealand began in the mid-20th century and expanded rapidly in the early 21st century, growing by 17% a year from 2000 to 2020. In 2020, New Zealand produced 329 million litres (87,000,000 US gal) from 39,935 hectares (98,680 acres) of vineyard area, of which 25,160 ha (about two-thirds) is dedicated to Sauvignon Blanc. Nearly 90% of total production is exported, chiefly to the United States, Britain and Australia, reaching a record NZ$1.92 billion in export revenue in 2020.

== History ==
Winemaking and viticulture date back to New Zealand's colonial era. New Zealand's first vineyard was planted in 1819 by missionary Samuel Marsden in Kerikeri. James Busby, New Zealand's governing British Resident in the 1830s, planted vineyards on his land near Waitangi, having earlier established what is now the Hunter Valley wine region during his time in Australia. He was producing wine for locally stationed British soldiers in 1836. In 1851, French Marist missionaries established a vineyard in Hawke's Bay for making Communion wine. Now part of the Mission Estate Winery, it is the oldest commercial vineyard in New Zealand. Portrait artist William Beetham planted Pinot Noir and Hermitage (Syrah) grapes at his Lansdowne, Masterton vineyard in 1881. In 1895, the New Zealand government's Department of Agriculture invited the expert consultant viticulturist and oenologist Romeo Bragato to investigate winemaking possibilities. After tasting Beetham's Hermitage, he concluded that New Zealand and the Wairarapa in particular were "pre-eminently suited to viticulture." His French wife, Marie Zelie Hermance Frere Beetham, supported Beetham in his endeavours. Their partnership and innovation to pursue winemaking helped form the basis of modern New Zealand's viticulture practices. In 1896, Joseph Soler, a Tarragonan winemaker settling in Whanganui, published a Māori language pamphlet entitled Kupu tohutohu mo te mahi whakato tapahanga waina karepe ("Instructions for propagating grapevine cuttings") for educating local Māori on viticulture.

Dalmatian immigrants arriving in New Zealand in the late 19th and early 20th centuries brought with them viticultural knowledge and planted vineyards in West and North Auckland. Typically, their vineyards produced table wine and fortified wine to suit the palates of their communities. For the first half of the 20th century, winemaking in New Zealand was a marginal economic activity. Land use during this period was primarily animal agriculture, and the exports of dairy, meat, and wool dominated the economy. Most New Zealanders were of British descent, and favoured beer and spirits; the temperance movement further reduced the national appreciation for wine. The Great Depression of the 1930s also hampered the growth of the fledgling industry.

By the 1970s, some of these inhibiting factors underwent important changes. In 1973, Britain entered the European Economic Community which required ending the favourable trade terms for New Zealand's meat and dairy exports. This led ultimately to a dramatic restructuring of the agricultural economy, and diversification away from traditional "primary" products—dairy, meat and wool—to products with potentially higher economic returns. Vines, which produce best in low moisture and low soil fertility environments, were seen as suitable for areas that had previously been marginal pasture.

The end of the 1960s saw the end of the New Zealand policy known as the "six o'clock swill", where pubs and bars were open for only an hour after the working day ended, and closed all day Sunday. The same legislative reform saw the introduction of BYO ("bring your own") licences for restaurants, which had a marked effect on New Zealanders' appreciation and consumption of wine.

Finally, the advent of jet airliners in the late 1960s and early 1970s ushered in the OE ("overseas experience"), where young, typically well-educated New Zealanders spent time living and working overseas, often in Europe. The ensuing exposure to wine while abroad subsequently stimulated demand within New Zealand.

=== Emergence of modern industry ===
In 1973, Montana Wines, now Brancott Estate owned by Pernod Ricard, planted Marlborough's first vineyards and produced its first Sauvignon Blanc in 1979, labelled by year of production (vintage) and grape variety, in the style of wine producers in Australia. That year, superior quality wines of Müller-Thurgau, Riesling and Pinotage were also produced. Good Cabernet Sauvignon wine from Auckland and Hawke's Bay bolstered the industry with ever-increasing investment, vineyard plantings, rising land prices and greater local interest and pride. The result of this boom was over-planting, particularly in hybrids and less well regarded but high yield varietals such as Müller-Thurgau. Hoping to address this issue, a 1984 government initiative paid growers to pull up vines, but many growers used the grants to swap these varieties with more fashionable ones, particularly Chardonnay and Sauvignon Blanc, often keeping the old rootstock. This, combined with the introduction throughout the 1980s of much improved canopy management techniques to reduce leaf vigour and improve grape quality, set the New Zealand wine industry on course for recovery and greatly improved quality.

=== Sauvignon Blanc breakthrough ===
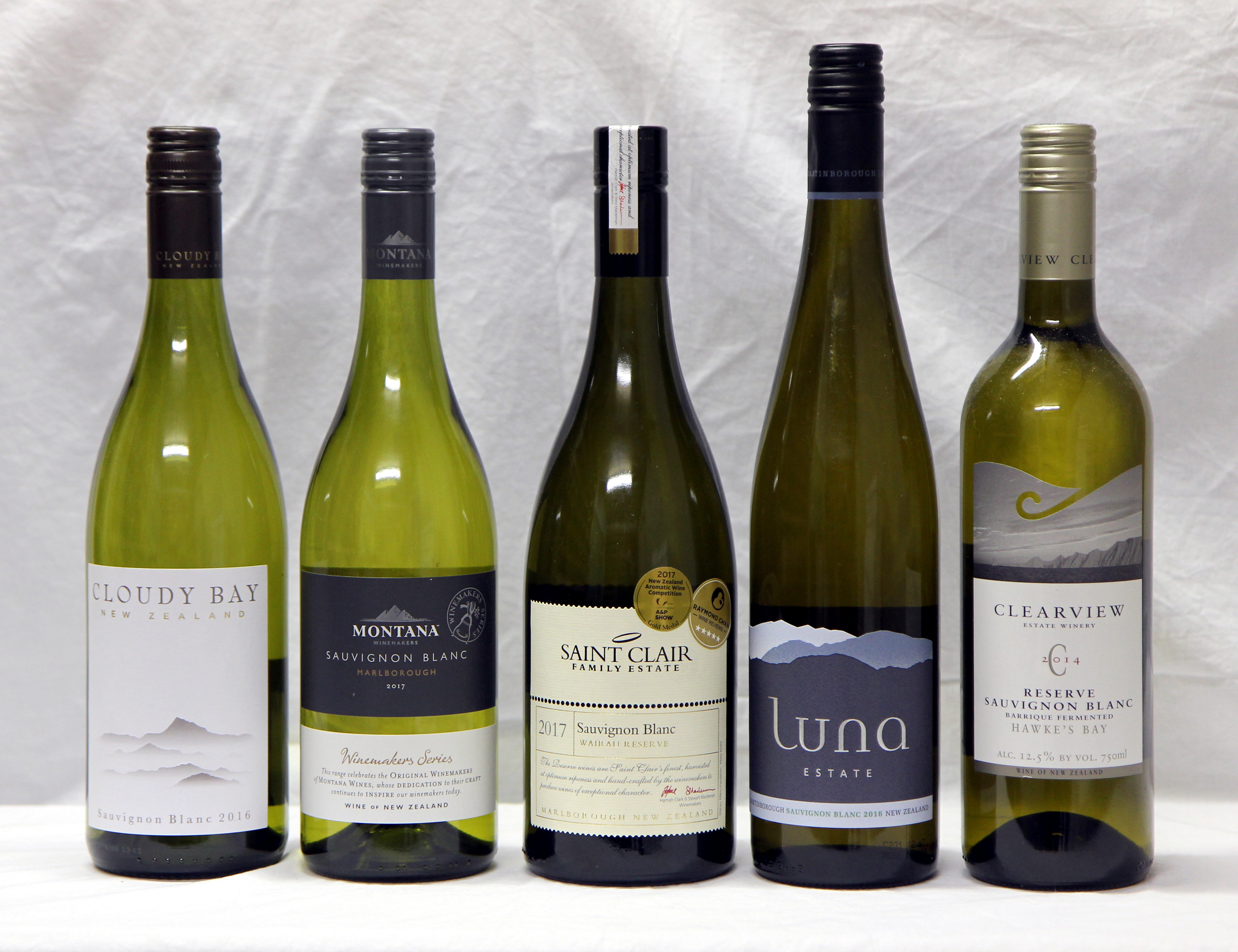
Left to right: Cloudy Bay (Marlborough); Montana (Marlborough) was bought by Pernod Ricard and is now Brancott Estate; Saint Clair (Marlborough); Luna Estate (Martinborough); Clearview (Hawke's Bay).

By the 1980s, wineries in New Zealand, especially in the Marlborough region, were producing outstanding Sauvignon Blanc. It was in 1985 that the Sauvignon Blanc from Cloudy Bay Vineyards finally garnered international attention and critical acclaim for New Zealand wine. Wine writer George Taber recounts Cloudy Bay is "what many people consider to be the world's best Sauvignon Blanc". New Zealand's reputation is now well established; Oz Clarke wrote New Zealand Sauvignon Blanc was "arguably the best in the world", and Mark Oldman wrote "New Zealand Sauvignon Blanc is like a child who inherits the best of both parents—exotic aromas found in ... the New World and the pungency and limy acidity of an Old World Sauvignon Blanc like Sancerre."

== Climate and soil ==
Wine regions are located mostly in free draining alluvial valleys—Hawke's Bay, Martinborough, Nelson, the Wairau and Awatere valleys of Marlborough, and Canterbury—with the notable exceptions of Waiheke Island, Kawarau Gorge in Central Otago. The alluvial deposits are typically the local sandstone called greywacke, which makes up much of the mountainous spine of New Zealand.

Sometimes the alluvial nature of the soil is important, as in Hawke's Bay where the deposits known as the Gimblett Gravels represent such quality characteristics that they are often mentioned on the wine label. The Gimblett Gravels is a former riverbed with very stony soils. The effect of the stones is to lower fertility, lower the water table, and act as a heat store that tempers the cool sea breezes that Hawke's Bay experiences. This creates a significantly warmer mesoclimate.

Waipara, in Canterbury, represents another soil type. The Omihi Hills, part of the Torlesse group of limestone deposits, are located here. Viticulturists have planted Pinot Noir here because of the French experience of the affinity between the grape type and the chalky soil on the Côte-d'Or. Even the greywacke alluvial soils in the Waipara valley floor have a higher calcium carbonate concentration than the Côte-d'Or, indicated by the milky water that flows in the Waipara River.

The Kawarau valley has a thin and patchy topsoil over a bedrock that is schist. Early growers blasted holes into the bare rock of north-facing slopes with miners' caps to provide planting holes for the vines. These conditions necessitate irrigation and make the vines work hard for nutrients. Irrigation, low cropping techniques, and the thermal effect of the rock produces great intensity for the grapes and subsequent wine.

The wine regions in New Zealand stretch from latitudes 36°S in the north (Northland) (comparable in latitude to Jerez, Spain), to 45°S (Central Otago) in the south (comparable in latitude to Bordeaux, France). New Zealand's climate is maritime, meaning that the sea moderates the weather, producing cooler summers and milder winters than would be expected at similar latitudes in Europe and North America. Maritime climates tend to demonstrate higher variability with cold snaps possible at any time of the year and warm periods even in the depth of winter. The climate is typically wetter, but wine regions have developed in rain shadows and in the east, on the opposite coast from the prevailing moisture-laden wind. The wine regions of New Zealand tend to experience cool nights even in the hottest of summers. The effect of consistently cool nights is to produce fruit, which is nearly always high in acidity.

== Industry structure and production methods ==
New Zealand's winemakers employ a variety of production techniques. The traditional concept of a vineyard, where grapes are grown on the land surrounding a central simply owned or family-owned estate with its own discrete viticultural and winemaking equipment and storage, is only one model. While the European cooperative model (where district or AOC village winemaking takes place in a centralised production facility) is uncommon, contract growing of fruit for winemakers has been a feature of the New Zealand industry since the start of the winemaking boom in the 1970s. Indeed, many well-known producers began as contract growers.

Many fledgling producers started out using contract fruit while waiting for their own vines to mature enough to produce production-quality fruit. Some producers use contract fruit to supplement the range of varieties they market, even using fruit from other geographical regions. For example, it is common to see an Auckland producer market a "Marlborough Sauvignon Blanc" or a Marlborough producer market a "Gisborne Chardonnay". Contract growing is an example of the use of indigenous agro-industrial methods that predate the New Zealand wine industry.

Another example of the adaptation of NZ methods toward the new industry was the universal use of stainless steel in winemaking adapted from the norms and standards of the New Zealand dairy industry. There was an existing small-scale industrial infrastructure ready for winemakers to employ economically. While current winemaking technology is almost universally sterile and hygienic worldwide, the natural antibiotic properties of alcohol production were more heavily relied upon in the 1970s when the New Zealand wine industry started.

This pervasive use of stainless steel had a distinctive effect on both New Zealand wine styles and the domestic palate. The early wines, which made a stir internationally, were lauded for the intensity and purity of the fruit in the wine. Indeed, the strength of flavour in the wine accommodated very dry styles, despite intense acidity. While stainless steel did not produce the intensity of fruit, it allowed for its exploitation. Even today, New Zealand white wines tend toward the drier end of the spectrum.

== Varieties, styles and directions ==
=== White wines ===
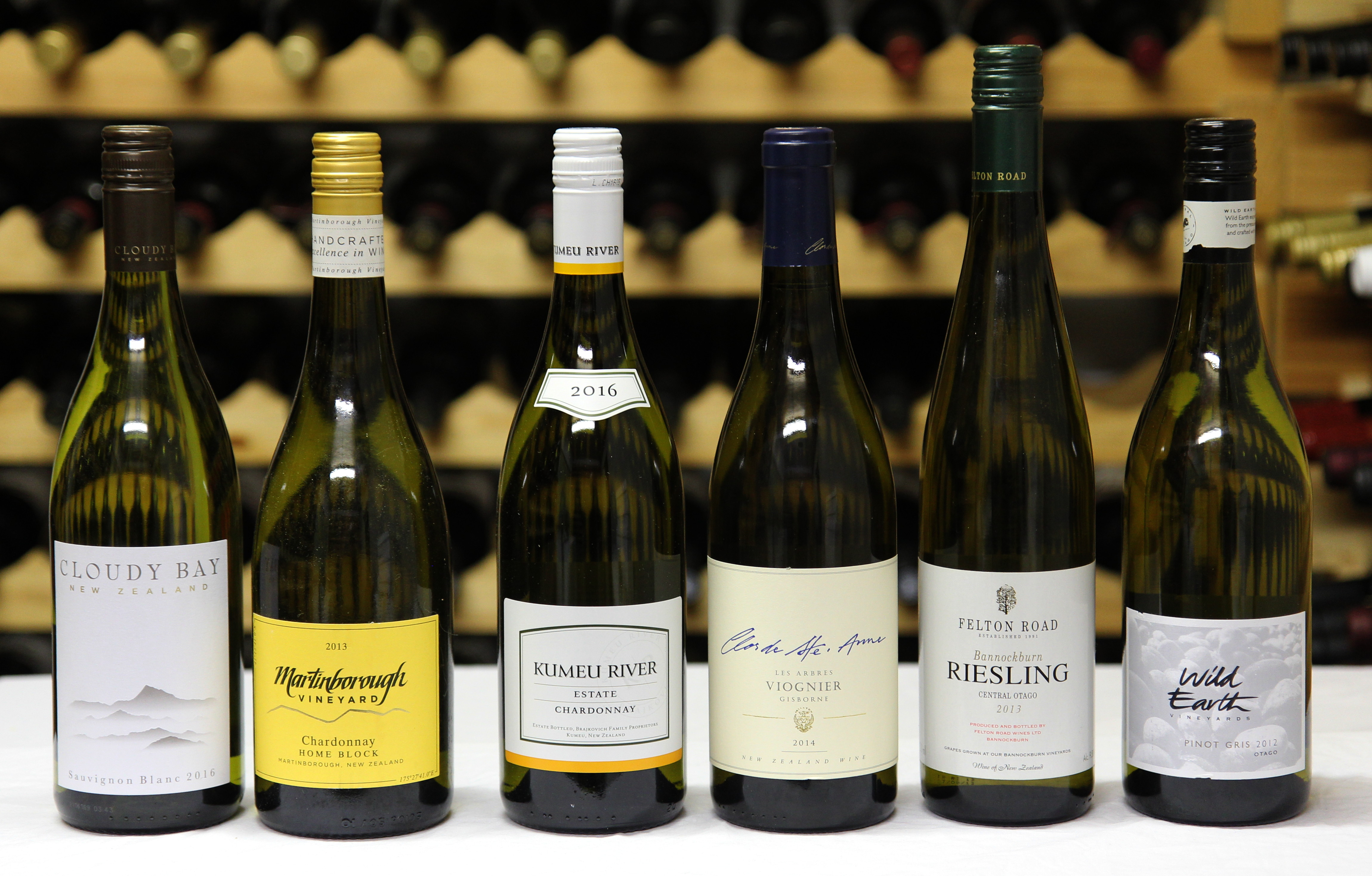
Left to right: Cloudy Bay brought New Zealand's Marlborough Sauvignon Blanc to international attention in the 1980s; Chardonnays from Martinborough (Wairarapa) and Kumeu (Auckland) regions; a single vineyard Viognier from Gisborne; Riesling and Pinot Gris from Central Otago.

==== Sauvignon Blanc ====
New Zealand has long been best known for its Sauvignon Blanc, which dominates its wine industry. In 2017, its vines took up 22,085 hectares (54,570 acres) of vineyard area, a full 60% of New Zealand's total grape planting, and Sauvignon Blanc wine made up 86% of the nation's exports. Many critics regard New Zealand's Sauvignon Blanc as among the best in the world. Historically, Sauvignon Blanc has been used in many French regions in both AOC and Vin de pays wine, and famously Sancerre and Pouilly Fumé. Following Robert Mondavi's lead in renaming Californian Sauvignon Blanc Fumé Blanc (partially in reference to Pouilly Fumé, but also to denote the smokiness of the wine produced from flinty soil and oak barrel ageing), there was a trend for oaked Sauvignon Blanc in New Zealand during the late 1980s. Strong oaky overtones dropped out of fashion through the 1990s but have since made a comeback, with several makers now offering oak-aged Sauvignon Blanc—Greywacke, Dog Point, te Pa (Sauvignon Blanc 'Oke'), Sacred Hill (Sauvage), Jackson Estate (Grey Ghost), Hans Herzog (Sur Lie) and Saint Clair (Barrique).

New Zealand pioneered the use of screwtop closures in fine wines because of the frequency of quality issues affecting wines being shipped long distances with cork closures.

==== Chardonnay ====
Chardonnay is produced as far south as Central Otago, but plantings increase moving further north. There is little discernible difference in styles of Chardonnay between the New Zealand wine regions; individual winemakers' recipes, use of oak, and the particular qualities of a vintage have tended to blur any distinction of terroir. Almost every region is represented among the most highly rated New Zealand Chardonnays, which include wines from Kumeu River Estate (Kumeu), Millton Estate (Gisborne), Church Road, Clearview, and Te Mata Estate (Hawke's Bay), Ata Rangi (Martinborough), Fromm (Marlborough), Neudorf (Nelson), and Felton Road (Central Otago). Although Chardonnay may be less fashionable and has declined in vineyard area (losing ground largely to Pinot Gris), winemakers in 2016 reported an upswing and strong sales. It also commands higher prices than any other New Zealand white wine variety.

==== Pinot Gris ====
Pinot Gris emerged in the early 2000s from almost nowhere to the country's fourth most planted variety in 2017, having overtaken Riesling in 2007. It is planted mostly in Marlborough, Hawke's Bay and Gisborne, with the remainder in the South Island. Some of the initial plantings of Pinot Gris were identified later as Flora; some Auckland winemakers allude to this in their Flora wine names, such as "The Rogue" from Ascension and "The Impostor" from Omaha Bay Vineyards.

==== Other white wines ====
Other white wine varietals grown in New Zealand include (in descending order of vineyard area) Riesling, Gewürztraminer and Viognier, and less commonly Chenin Blanc, Albariño, Arneis and Sémillon. Riesling is produced predominantly in Martinborough and the South Island, as is Gewürztraminer, although it is also planted extensively in Gisborne. Chenin Blanc was once more important, but the viticultural peculiarities of the variety, particularly its unpredictable cropping in New Zealand, have led to its disfavour. Nevertheless, good examples exist from Esk Valley, Margrain and Millton Estate.

=== Red wines ===
New Zealand's Pinot Noir has become well known internationally. Plantings of Pinot Noir grew in the early 21st century to become New Zealand's second-most planted variety after Sauvignon Blanc. In the warmer northerly regions, particularly Hawke's Bay and Waiheke Island, Syrah and Merlot-dominant Bordeaux style blends have gained recognition.

==== Pinot Noir ====
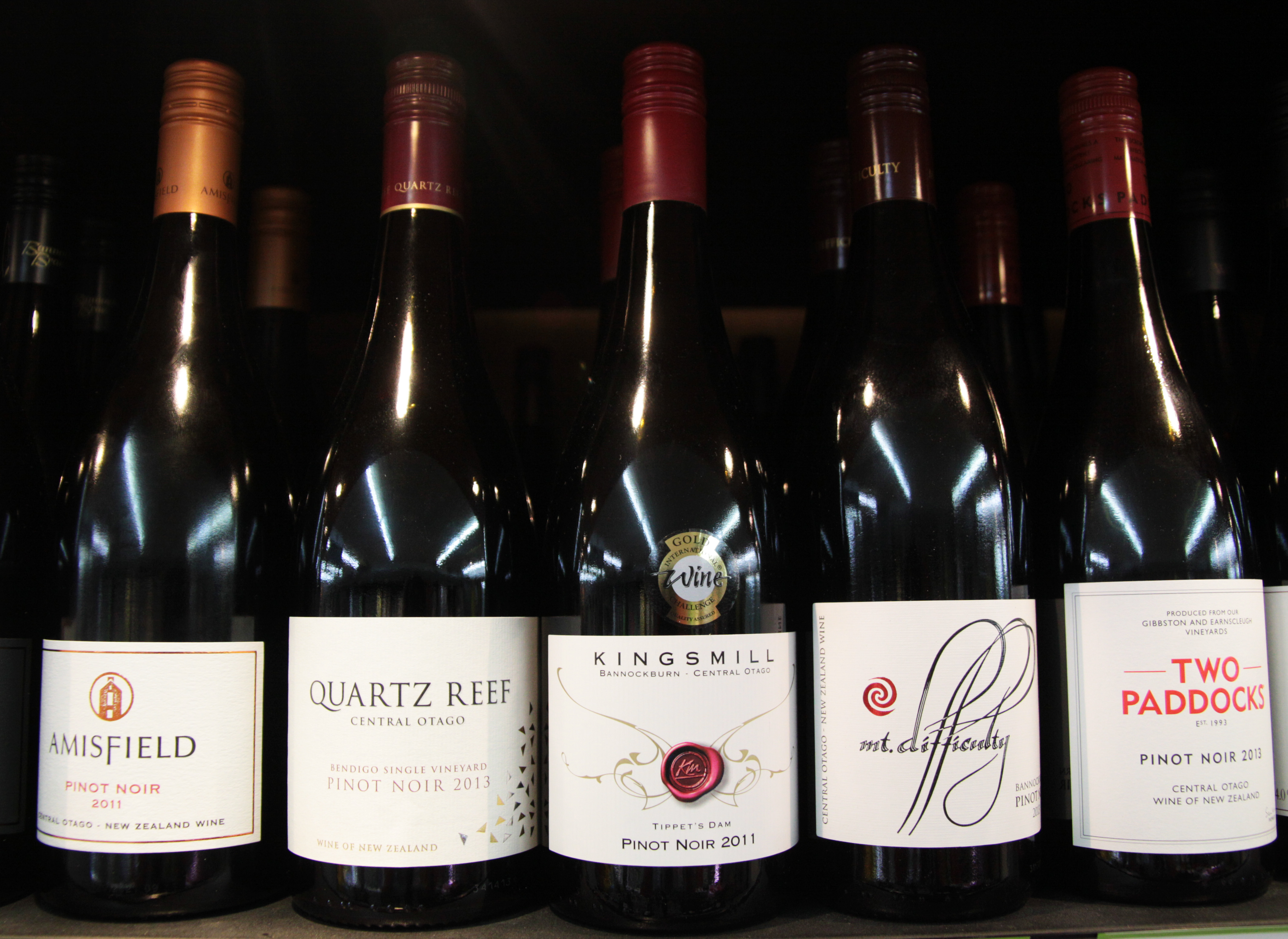
Several Pinot Noir wines from Central Otago

The late 1970s were early in the modern wine industry, and the comparatively low annual sunshine hours to be found in New Zealand discouraged the planting of red varieties. Despite this, some held great hopes for Pinot Noir. Initial results were mixed because of limited access to good clones, yet the Saint Helena 1984 Pinot Noir was notable enough that the Canterbury region was thought to become the New Zealand home for Pinot Noir. While the early excitement passed, the Canterbury region has witnessed the development of Pinot Noir as the dominant red variety, particularly in the now dominant Waipara sub-region. Producers include Waipara Hills, Pegasus Bay, Waipara Springs, Muddy Water, Greystone, Omihi Hills and Black Estate.

The next region to excel with Pinot Noir was Martinborough, 75 kilometres (47 mi) east of Wellington in the Wairarapa region. Several vineyards, including Palliser Estate, Martinborough Vineyards, Murdoch James Estate (now Luna Estate) and Ata Rangi consistently produced interesting and increasingly complex wine from Pinot Noir at the end of the 1980s and into the 1990s.

At around this time, the first plantings of Pinot Noir in Central Otago occurred in the Kawarau Gorge. Central Otago had a long (for New Zealand) history as a producer of quality stone fruit, particularly cherries. Significantly further south than all other wine regions in New Zealand, it benefited from being surrounded by mountain ranges which increased both its daily and seasonal temperature variations, making the climate unusual in the typically maritime conditions in New Zealand, and ideal for growing Pinot Noir. Indeed, recent years have seen Pinot Noir from Central Otago win numerous international awards and accolades, and excite the interest of British wine commentators including Jancis Robinson and Oz Clarke. Not only did the wines have the distinctive acidity and abundant fruit of New Zealand wines, but they demonstrated a great deal of complexity, with aromas and flavours not common in New Zealand wine and normally associated with Burgundy wine. Notable producers include Akarua, Felton Road, Prophets rock, Moko Hills, Chard Farm and Mount Difficulty.

At around the same period, small-scale plantings were also established in the Waitaki Valley, on the boundary of North Otago and Canterbury. With vines first planted in 2001, the region is a relative newcomer to viticulture, but its limestone-rich soils and very cool climate quickly attracted a small group of dedicated producers. Early vineyards such as Clos Ostler, planted with Pinot Noir in 2002 by regional pioneers Jim Jerram and Jeff Sinnott, helped demonstrate the area’s potential for premium winegrowing. Clos Ostler later gained recognition for its limestone-grown Pinot Noir, with critics noting the wines for their mineral structure, savoury complexity, and ageing potential, and has become regarded among New Zealand’s leading Pinot Noir producers. The valley has since gained recognition for producing distinctive wines, and the establishment of an official geographical indication confirmed the region’s growing reputation and unique identity.

In a blind tasting of New Zealand Pinot Noir in 2006, Michael Cooper reported that of the top ten wines, five came from Central Otago, four from Marlborough and one from Waipara. This compares with all top ten wines coming from Marlborough in an equivalent blind tasting in the previous year. Cooper suggested that this has to do with more Central Otago production becoming available in commercial quantities, than the relative qualities of the regions' Pinot Noir.

As is the case for other New Zealand wine, New Zealand Pinot Noir is fruit-driven, forward and early maturing in the bottle. It tends to be quite full bodied (for the variety), very approachable and oak maturation tends to be restrained. High quality examples of New Zealand Pinot Noir are distinguished by savoury, earthy flavours with a greater complexity. In an article in Decanter (September 2014), Bob Campbell suggests regional styles are starting to emerge within New Zealand Pinot Noir. Marlborough, with by far the largest plantings of Pinot, produces wines that are quite aromatic, red fruit in particular red cherry, with a firm tannic structure that provides cellaring potential.

==== Bordeaux-style blends and Syrah ====
New Zealand red wines are also made from the classic Bordeaux varieties, mainly Merlot, with Cabernet Sauvignon, Cabernet Franc, Malbec, and Petit Verdot. Syrah wines from Hawke's Bay, particularly the Gimblett Gravels and Bridge Pa Triangle sub-regions, as well as farther north from Waiheke Island, have also gained a good reputation internationally.

Early success in the Hawke's Bay Region in the 1960s by McWilliams and in the 1980s by Te Mata Estate, led to a phase in the 1980s and 1990s of mainly Cabernet Sauvignon planting and wine production by large producers such as Corbans, McWilliams, and Mission Estate. As viticultural techniques were improved and tailored to New Zealand's maritime climate, other Bordeaux-style grapes were planted, and a switch of emphasis made to the more suitable, earlier-ripening Merlot. Today, Merlot is the second most planted red variety after Pinot Noir, accounting for 1,087 hectares (2,690 acres), outweighing Cabernet Sauvignon plantings by five to one.

Typically, these Bordeaux blends come from the hotter and drier regions of New Zealand, largely in the Hawke's Bay Region. Wines that typify the best of Hawke's Bay include Elephant Hill's Airavata, Te Mata Estate's Coleraine, Craggy Range's Sophia, Newton Forrest Estate's Cornerstone, Esk Valley's The Terraces and Villa Maria's Reserve Merlot and Cabernet. Waiheke Island, whilst a very small viticultural region, also produces acclaimed red wines like the Larose from Stonyridge, the Dreadnought and Ironclad from Man O' War, wines from Destiny Bay, and Goldie Estate. In Marlborough, Hans Herzog Estate is famous for making the Spirit of Marlborough, and examples of Bordeaux blends can be found as far south as Waipara, where the Maestro from Pegasus Bay also demonstrates the shift from Cabernet Sauvignon to Merlot predominant blends.

The amount of Cabernet Sauvignon in production has dropped to a third of what it was in the early 2000s and has been overtaken by a tripling of Syrah planting in that time. In the same time period, Sauvignon Blanc has grown more than five-fold and Pinot Noir has doubled. Whilst today's fashion has turned from Bordeaux blends to Pinot Noir, it also indicates the marginality of Cabernet Sauvignon in New Zealand conditions.

==== Other red wines ====
There are some producers dedicated to establishing other red grape varieties. New Zealand has small plantings of Tempranillo, Pinotage, Montepulciano and Sangiovese in Hawke's Bay and the warmer Auckland regions.

=== Rosé ===
Most New Zealand wine producers that produce Pinot Noir or Merlot also produce a rosé style wine, although it is sometimes found made from other red varieties. New Zealand rosé is made to drink immediately rather than age, resulting in the crisp, fresh, fruit-forward flavours popular with the New Zealand public. Well rated examples are from Forrest, Isabel, Ti Point, Whitehaven and Rapaura Springs.

=== Sparkling wine ===
Méthode Marlborough, a collaboration of sparkling wine producers

Méthode traditionelle sparkling wine is produced in New Zealand. In 1956, Selaks in Kumeu made the first commercial sparkling wine called Champelle. In 1975, Daniel Le Brun, a Champagne maker, emigrated to New Zealand to begin producing méthode traditionelle in Marlborough. The suitability of the Marlborough terroir and success of the wines produced over the next 20 years were sufficient to attract investment from large Champagne producers, most notably Deutz and Moët & Chandon. Today, the Le Brun family continues to produce well-awarded méthode sparkling wine, operating as No. 1 Family Estate, after Lion acquired the Daniel Le Brun name. In 2013, several Marlborough producers established Méthode Marlborough, a collaborative organisation to standardise and promote the brand both domestically and internationally.

Although the majority of méthode traditionelle sparkling wines in New Zealand are made in Marlborough, there are also examples from throughout the rest of New Zealand. Quartz Reef is based in Central Otago, Church Road in Hawke's Bay, and Lindauer (originally established in Gisborne now also owned by Lion); there are makers as far north as the Auckland regions as well.

Exports of New Zealand sparkling wines are chiefly to the United Kingdom, where the best-known examples there are the Pelorus from Cloudy Bay, now owned by LVMH, and the Special Reserve from Lindauer. More recently, exports of méthode have been declining, halving in volume between 2005 and 2011, and now making up less than one percent of total New Zealand exports. This is due partly to a rise in popularity and production of sparkling Sauvignon Blanc, a new style of sparkling New Zealand wine, as well as the 21st century advent and success of English sparkling wine on UK shelves.

== Wine regions of New Zealand ==
Map showing the major New Zealand wine regions (Geographical Indications)

New law came into force in New Zealand in 2017 that established a Geographical Indication (GI) classification for New Zealand wine, equivalent to the European Protected Geographical Indication (PGI) classification and the American Viticultural Areas in the United States. In 2017, a total of 18 applications were lodged with the GI register at the Intellectual Property Office of New Zealand, and registrations were complete by early 2019.

=== Northland ===
Northland is the most northerly wine region in New Zealand, and thus closest to the equator. A Geographical Indication since October 2017, it is also the smallest GI, producing 269 tonnes in 2020 from an area of 71 hectares (180 acres) under vines. Although Chardonnay is the most planted variety, Northland is most well known for ripe Syrah red wines, and white wines from Pinot Gris, which together comprise the top three planted varieties. Some Northland wineries are also making wine from warmer climate grapes such as Montepulciano, Chambourcin and Pinotage. The combination of high summer temperatures and high rainfall can be challenging for viticulture; although irrigation is not needed, the humidity can encourage some pests and diseases. The fertile soils and Northland climate also results in high vine productivity, requiring good vineyard management to limit yields in order to ensure better quality wines. Consequently, Northland tends to produce ripe wines, with low acidity.

=== Auckland ===
The Auckland Geographical Indication is a small region covering the greater Auckland Region, with a total vineyard area in 2022 of 285 hectares (700 acres). The region mostly consists of small boutique wineries, and produces some of New Zealand's finest Chardonnay white wines, as well as red Bordeaux-style wines and Syrah. Auckland has three sub-regions established as geographical indications: Waiheke Island, Kumeu, and Matakana.

=== Gisborne ===
Although the Gisborne GI established in October 2017 covers most of the East Cape Gisborne District, most of the 1,191 hectares (2,940 acres) of vineyard area in 2020 is concentrated in a relatively small area around Gisborne city. The fertile Gisborne region originally grew prodigious grape yields throughout the mid-20th Century, which was mostly used to make fortified and cask wines. In the 1980s, a shift away from cask wine for better quality, bottled still wine meant that huge areas of bulk varieties, most notably Müller-Thurgau, were uprooted and replaced with Chardonnay and Gewürztraminer, for which the region is well known today. It is also the world's most easterly vine-producing region.

=== Hawke's Bay ===
Hawke's Bay is New Zealand's oldest and second-largest wine region, and includes the Gimblett Gravels, Bridge Pa Triangle and Te Mata Special Character Zone sub-regions. It is best known for its Merlot and Syrah red wines, and white wines mainly from Chardonnay, Sauvignon Blanc and Viognier.

=== Wairarapa ===
The Wairarapa winegrowing region, a Geographical Indication since October 2017, is one of New Zealand's smallest. It contains two GI sub-regions, Gladstone and Martinborough, as well as Masterton and Opaki. Martinborough was the original area planted on the basis of careful scientific study in the 1970s, which identified its soils and climate as perfectly suited to the cultivation of Pinot Noir. As a consequence, many of the vineyards established there are older than their counterparts in the rest of the Wairarapa. In general, the area lies in the rain shadow of the Tararua Range, which gives it a warm climate with relatively low rainfall. Subtle differences are seen in the wines from the South Wairarapa (which includes Martinborough), which has more maritime influences, to those grown farther north in Gladstone and Masterton.

By 2020, the Wairarapa had 126 vineyards with a total area of 1,067 hectares (2,640 acres), or about three per cent of the New Zealand total. Nearly half of this area is Pinot Noir, the remainder mostly Sauvignon Blanc, with smaller areas of Pinot Gris, Chardonnay, Riesling and Syrah.

==== Martinborough ====
Martinborough is a small wine village located 75 kilometres (47 mi) east of Wellington by road, in the South Wairarapa. The combination of topography, geology, climate and human effort has led to the region becoming one of New Zealand's premier wine regions, despite its small size, particularly for Pinot Noir. The growing season from flowering to harvest is amongst the longest in New Zealand. Naturally breezy conditions control vine vigour, creating lower yields of grapes with greater intensity. A genuine cool climate, with a long, dry autumn, provides ideal ripening conditions for Pinot Noir and other varietals, such as Sauvignon Blanc, Pinot Gris and Syrah. Most of the wineries are on the Martinborough terrace, a raised alluvial terrace of the nearby Ruamāhanga River.

Martinborough wineries are often relatively small and typically family-owned, with a stated focus on producing quality rather than quantity. Among the many long-established wineries, several, including Martinborough Vineyard, Schubert Wines, Te Kairanga, Ata Rangi, Palliser Estate, Luna Estate, Dry River, Escarpment, Te Hera, and Craggy Range have become internationally recognised for their Pinot Noir.

=== Nelson ===
Nelson has the sunniest climate in New Zealand, with an annual average sunshine total of over 2400 hours, approximately equivalent to Tuscany. The long autumns permit the production of fine late-harvest wines. There are two sub-regions in Nelson: Waimea and Moutere Valley. Notable wineries from the region include Neudorf Vineyards, awarded Raymond Chan's 2012 Winery of the Year and Seifried Estate Winery, who have won Champion Open White Wine, Champion Sauvignon Blanc and Best Wine - Nelson at the New Zealand Wine Awards in 2019.

=== Marlborough ===
New Zealand vineyard area by region, 2020. Marlborough accounts for about two thirds of the total vineyard area in New Zealand.
1. Marlborough (69.6%)
2. Hawke's Bay (12.6%)
3. Central Otago (4.80%)
4. North Canterbury (3.40%)
5. Gisborne (3.00%)
6. Nelson (2.80%)
7. Wairarapa (2.60%)
8. Other (1.10%)
Data from New Zealand Winegrowers annual report.

Marlborough is by far the largest wine region in New Zealand, accounting for three-quarters of the country's total wine production and 70% of its planted vineyard area. Internationally it is also the most recognised, its wines accounting for 85% of New Zealand's 2019 wine exports. Marlborough is well known internationally for its Sauvignon Blanc, and its Pinot Noir is also attracting attention.

=== Canterbury ===
The Canterbury Geographical Indication covers wine made anywhere within the Canterbury Region of New Zealand, a very large area of some 44,500 square kilometres (17,200 sq mi). The North Canterbury GI is a subregion established in 2020 and is simply the top half of the larger Canterbury GI, north of the Rakaia River. In practice most Canterbury vineyards are concentrated in the Waipara Valley GI, a small subregion of North Canterbury with a warm microclimate and limestone soils about 60 kilometres (37 mi) north of the city of Christchurch.

=== Waitaki Valley ===
The Waitaki Valley wine region lies in North Otago on the southern side of the Waitaki River, near the provincial boundary with Canterbury. Its vineyards extend from the limestone escarpments around Duntroon towards Omarama, along a corridor of approximately 75 kilometres (47 mi). The geographical indication Waitaki Valley North Otago / Waitaki Valley was registered on 3 December 2018.

The region combines north-facing limestone slopes and river gravels containing greywacke and schist with a cool, maritime-influenced climate. Warm summers and long, dry autumns can allow prolonged ripening, although frost presents a recurring risk. Its principal varieties are Pinot Noir, Pinot Gris, Chardonnay and Riesling. Waitaki Pinot Noir has been described as more restrained and delicate than that of neighbouring Central Otago.

Modern commercial planting began in 2001. Early ventures included Clos Ostler, where Jim Jerram and Jeff Sinnott planted Pinot Noir in 2002 after investigating sites from 1998. Low yields, high production costs and the global financial crisis subsequently slowed the region's development. New Zealand Winegrowers recorded 49 hectares (120 acres) planted, of which 45 hectares (110 acres) was producing, in 2025.

=== Central Otago ===
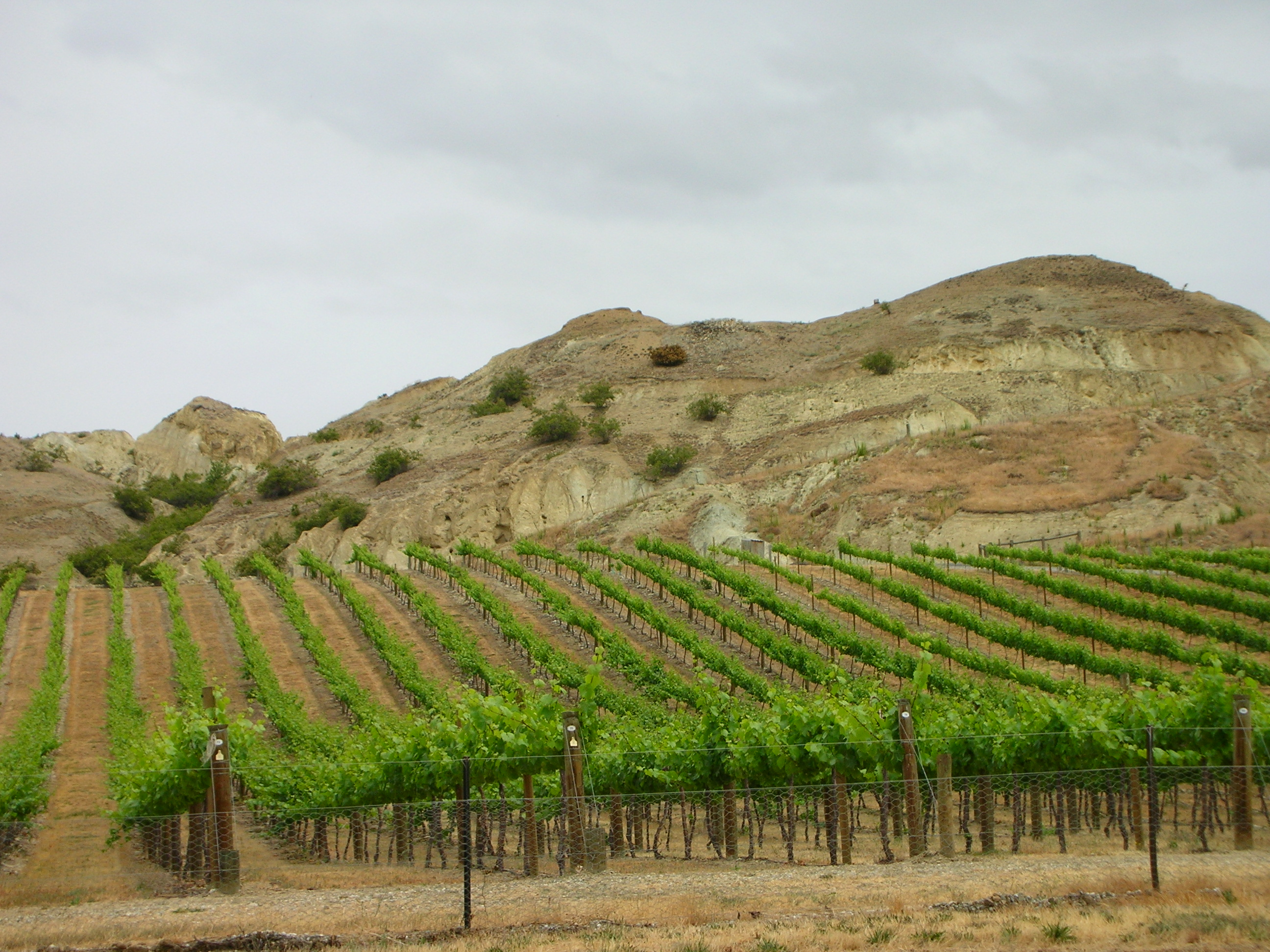
Vineyard in Bannockburn, Central Otago

Central Otago is home to the world's most southerly wine region. The vineyards are the highest in New Zealand – at 200 to 400 metres (660 to 1,310 ft) above sea level – on the steep slopes of lakesides and the edges of deep river gorges, often in glacial soils. Central Otago is a sheltered inland area with a continental microclimate characterised by hot dry summers, short cool autumns, and crisp cold winters. It is divided into several subregions around Bannockburn, Bendigo, Gibbston and Queenstown, Wānaka, the Kawarau Gorge, the Alexandra Basin, and the Cromwell Basin.

==== Bannockburn ====
Bannockburn is a small Geographical Indication and sub-region of the Central Otago GI, located within the larger Cromwell Basin and defined by the Kawarau River and Lake Dunstan to the north and the high mountains of the Southern Alps, specifically the Cairnmuir and Carrick Ranges, to the east, south and west.

== Trends in production and export ==
The initial focus for the industry's export efforts was the United Kingdom. The late 1970s and early 1980s were not only pioneering times for production but also for marketing. As with many New Zealand products, wine was only really taken seriously at home when it was noticed and praised overseas, and in particular by British wine commentators and critics. For much of the history of New Zealand's wine exports, the United Kingdom market, with its lack of indigenous production, great demand, and sophisticated wine palate, has been either the principal or only market. More recently, this UK dominance has eroded. In 2000, the UK market represented half of New Zealand's total exports of NZ$168 million. By 2017, the export value had risen to NZ$1.66 billion. UK exports had dropped to second place at 23% of total exports behind the United States at 31%, with Australia accounting for 22% in third place. Other countries include Canada (six per cent), the Netherlands (three per cent), and China (two per cent). Wine exports to China, whilst still only a small proportion of export revenue, are remarkable for having grown more than tenfold in the decade since 2008. Some wineries and industry pundits view the Chinese market as having a large untapped potential.

Today, New Zealand's wine industry is highly successful in the international market. New Zealand Winegrowers reported in 2020 that export sales had risen to a record NZ$1.92 billion, with a goal to achieve NZ$2 billion and become a top five export industry. To meet the increasing demand for its wines, the entire country's vineyard plantings grew from 7,410 hectares (18,300 acres) in 1997 to 37,129 hectares (91,750 acres) in 2017. This more than five-fold increase in vineyard area over just two decades has led to a similar increase in sales and export revenue. In 2008, The Economist reported that for the first time, wine overtook wool to become New Zealand's 12th most valuable export at NZ$760 million, up from only NZ$94 million just a decade earlier in 1997. The industry sold one billion glasses of wine in nearly 100 countries, and over 10% of the wine sold in Britain for more than £5 was from New Zealand.

As in many places in the world, an emerging trend in New Zealand wine is an increased recognition for high quality wines coming from small boutique wineries. In 2020, these smaller producers, with a vineyard area of no more than 20 hectares (49 acres), represented over three-quarters of New Zealand's wineries. They are located fairly evenly throughout all wine regions, with the larger producers predominantly in Marlborough, Hawke's Bay, Gisborne, and Waipara.

New Zealand Winegrowers has also placed a growing emphasis on sustainability and organic certification, including monitoring and measuring water, energy, soil and pest management, waste reuse, land and biodiversity restoration, and social factors such as tourism impacts and staff training. Its first annual sustainability report in 2016 states that 98% of NZ's vineyard area is certified under its Sustainable Winegrowing New Zealand scheme.

== Praise and criticism ==
Cloudy Bay Vineyards set a new standard for New World Sauvignon Blanc and was arguably responsible for the huge increase in interest in it, particularly in the United Kingdom. Louis Vuitton Moët Hennessy, a French luxury brand conglomerate, now owns a controlling interest in Cloudy Bay. Following on from the early success of Sauvignon Blanc, New Zealand has been building a strong reputation with other styles—Pinot Noir, Chardonnay, Cabernet/Merlot blends, Pinot Gris and Syrah to name a few.

UK wine writer Paul Howard praised New Zealand Pinot Noir in 2006, writing that "comparisons with Burgundy are inevitable" and that New Zealand Pinot Noir is:

"rapidly developing its own distinctive style, often with deeper colour, purer fruit and higher alcohol. While regional differences are apparent, the best wines do have Burgundy's elusive complexity, texture and 'pinosity' and are capable of ageing. It is a testament to the skill and craft of New Zealand producers that poor examples are infrequently encountered."

In that same year, Pinot Noir overtook Chardonnay as New Zealand's second most-planted variety, after Sauvignon Blanc. In the decade since, its international reputation has "gone from strength to strength" and has performed very well in reviews and competitions; wine from Marlborough has won the Champion Pinot Noir Trophy three times at the International Wine and Spirit Competition – in 2006, 2007, and by Giesen Wines most recently in 2016. A New Zealand wine also won the 2014 Decanter International Trophy for Best in Show Pinot Noir, up against Burgundy Gevrey-Chambertin Premier Cru and other top wines from around the world. However, many of the top producers in France do not submit their wines to international competitions.

Waitaki Valley has also received international recognition for Pinot Noir. At the 2025 International Wine Challenge, Clos Ostler's Caroline's Pinot Noir 2021 won the New Zealand Red Trophy, New Zealand Pinot Noir Trophy and North Otago Pinot Noir Trophy. At the 2026 Decanter World Wine Awards, its EOS Pinot Noir 2022 received 97 points and the region's first Platinum medal.

In 2023, the Hawkes Bay region was officially declared a Great Wine Capital of the World, alongside Bordeaux, Napa Valley and Verona.

== Statistics ==
New Zealand annual wine production (1990–2025), in millions of litres of wine. Production increased dramatically in the first two decades of the 21st century.
Statistics from New Zealand Winegrowers 1993–2025 annual reports.

New Zealand wine production
Year	Productive wine area (hectares)	Total Production (millions of litres)
1981	2,600	44.0
1982	4,700	47.0
1983	5,000	57.7
1984	5,500	41.7
1985	5,900	59.6
1986	4,300	42.4
1987	-	37.7
1988	-	39.2
1989	4,270	45.3
1990	4,880	54.4
1991	5,440	49.9
1992	5,800	41.6
1993	5,980	32.5
1994	6,110	41.1
1995	6,110	56.4
1996	6,610	57.3
1997	7,410	45.8
1998	7,580	60.6
1999	9,000	60.2
2000	10,197	60.2
2001	11,648	53.3
2002	13,787	89.0
2003	15,800	55.0
2004	18,112	119.2
2005	21,002	102.2
2006	22,616	133.2
2007	25,355	147.6
2008	29,310	205.2
2009	31,964	205.2
2010	33,428	190.0
2011	34,500	235.0
2012	35,337	194.0
2013	35,182	248.4
2014	35,510	320.4
2015	35,463	234.7
2016	36,226	313.9
2017	36,943	285.1
2018	38,073	301.7
2019	38,680	297.4
2020	39,935	329.0
2021	40,949	266.4
2022	41,304	383.0
2023	41,991	360.7
2024	41,628	284.4
2025	42,520	374.0

New Zealand vineyard area by grape variety over time (1990–2025), in hectares. The more than five-fold growth of Sauvignon Blanc plantings in the first two decades of the 21st century is evident, along with a similar rapid growth of Pinot Gris. Riesling, Merlot and Chardonnay are more or less unchanged or have declined slightly. A doubling of Pinot Noir has also occurred, and a tripling of the much smaller area of Syrah is countered by a corresponding decline in Cabernet Sauvignon.
Statistics from New Zealand Winegrowers 1998–2025 annual reports.

=== By region ===
New Zealand wine production by region, 2025
Region	Vineyard area (ha)	Tonnes crushed
Northland	68	223
Auckland	258	890
Gisborne	1,265	12,679
Hawke's Bay	4,605	35,417
Wairarapa	1,122	7,597
Marlborough	30,469	410,291
Nelson	1,059	12,166
North Canterbury	1,497	15,019
Waitaki Valley	45	283
Central Otago	2,106	8,717

== See also ==
- New Zealand Winegrowers
- New World wine
- Alcohol in New Zealand
