= Waiheke Island wine region =

Wine region in New Zealand

Waiheke Island
- Wine region
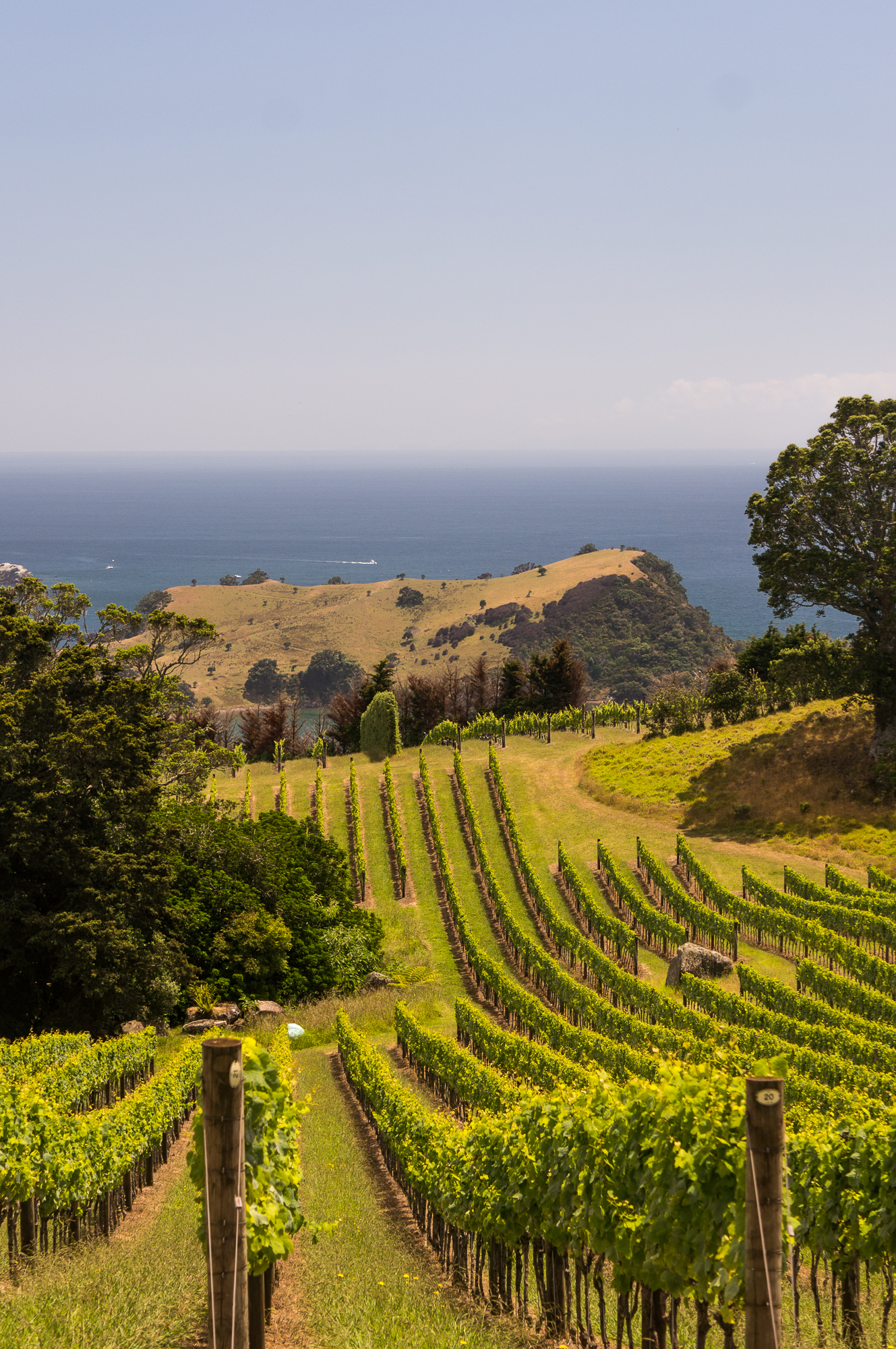
- A Man O' War vineyard on Waiheke Island, looking east over the Hauraki Gulf
- Type: Geographical Indication
- Year established: 2018
- Country: New Zealand
- Part of: Auckland
- Size of planted vineyards: Auckland GI: 315 hectares (780 acres)
- Grapes produced: Syrah; Merlot; Cabernet Sauvignon; Chardonnay
- Comments: Data source: New Zealand Winegrowers, 2020

The Waiheke Island wine region is a geographical indication and wine-growing region of New Zealand.

== Background ==
Waiheke Island is an island east of Auckland city in the Hauraki Gulf and is a geographical indication within the larger Auckland GI. It has a dry and warm mesoclimate, and is planted primarily in French red grape varieties: Syrah, Merlot, and Cabernet Sauvignon, as well as the white grape varieties Chardonnay and Pinot Gris. The Bordeaux style red wines that are produced are considered to be significantly ripe and full bodied, and some of the best in New Zealand. The Larose from Stonyridge Estate has an international reputation and is often compared with some of the best Bordeaux wine in the world, and comparing favourably with the likes of Château Latour and Château Mouton-Rothschild. Other notable wine producers are Destiny Bay Vineyards (Magna Praemia), Obsidian Vineyard, Peacock Sky, Man O'War (Dreadnought Syrah), Cable Bay, Mudbrick and Te Motu.

Since Waiheke Island itself has a very small area of 92 square kilometres (36 sq mi), the wines tend to carry a premium price because of the inherently small scale of the wineries, the cost of land and the increased cost of access to the island by boat.
