= Cloudy Bay Vineyards =

New Zealand winery

Cloudy Bay
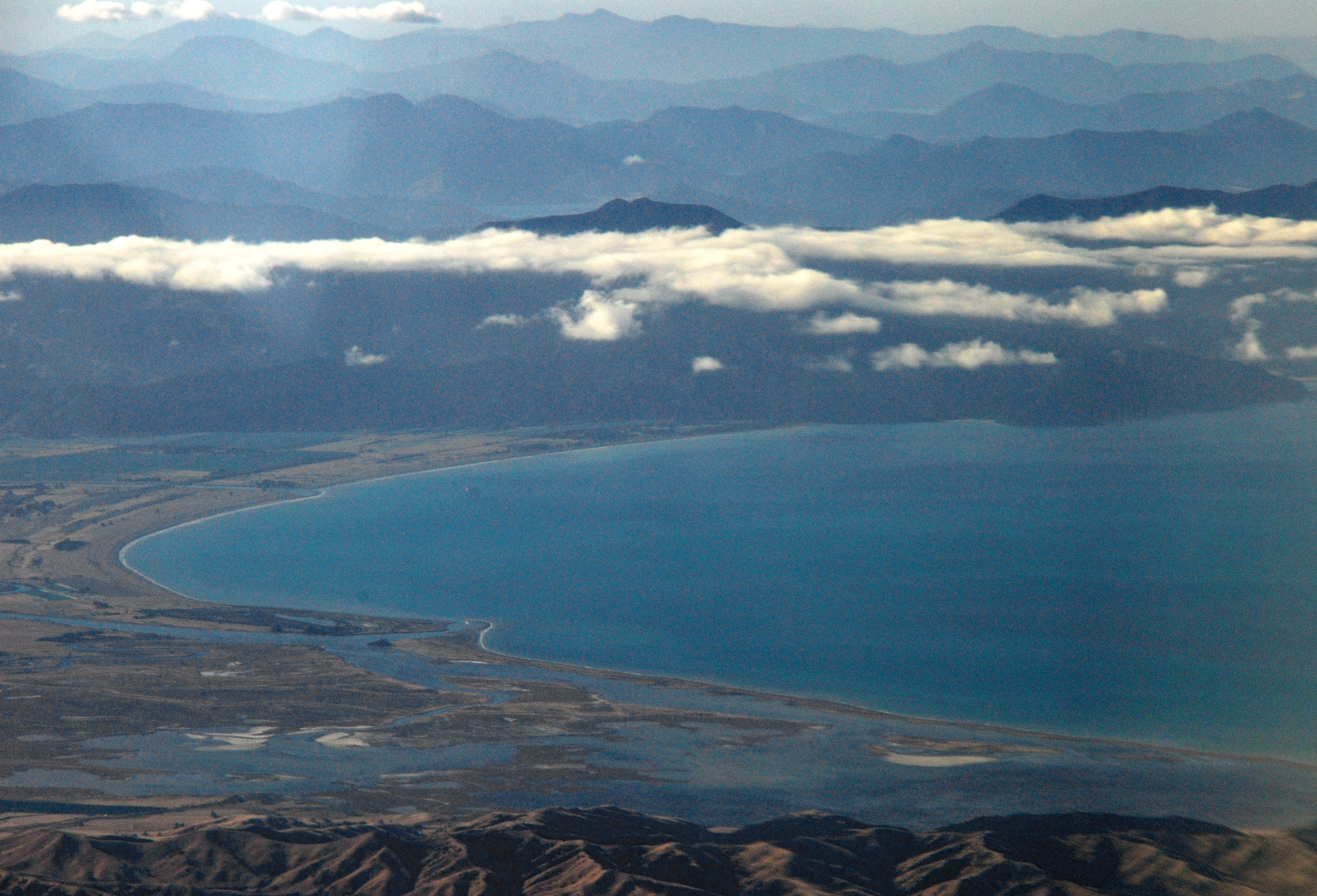
- Location: New Zealand
- Coordinates: 41.49170°S 173.8795°E
- Wine region: Marlborough
- Founded: 1985; 41 years ago
- Key people: David Hohnen
- Parent company: LVMH
- Known for: Sauvignon Blanc; Te Koko; Te Wahi; Pelorus
- Varietals: Pinot Noir, Chardonnay, Sauvignon Blanc
- Tasting: Open to the public
- Website: Official website

Cloudy Bay Vineyards is a winery based in the Marlborough wine region of New Zealand, with vineyards in both Marlborough and Central Otago. Established in 1985 as one of the earliest wineries founded in Marlborough, Cloudy Bay attracted international acclaim for its first Sauvignon Blanc wines in the 1980s and was instrumental in establishing New Zealand's international reputation for white wine. It was acquired by Champagne house Veuve Clicquot in 2003 and is now a LVMH brand.

== History ==
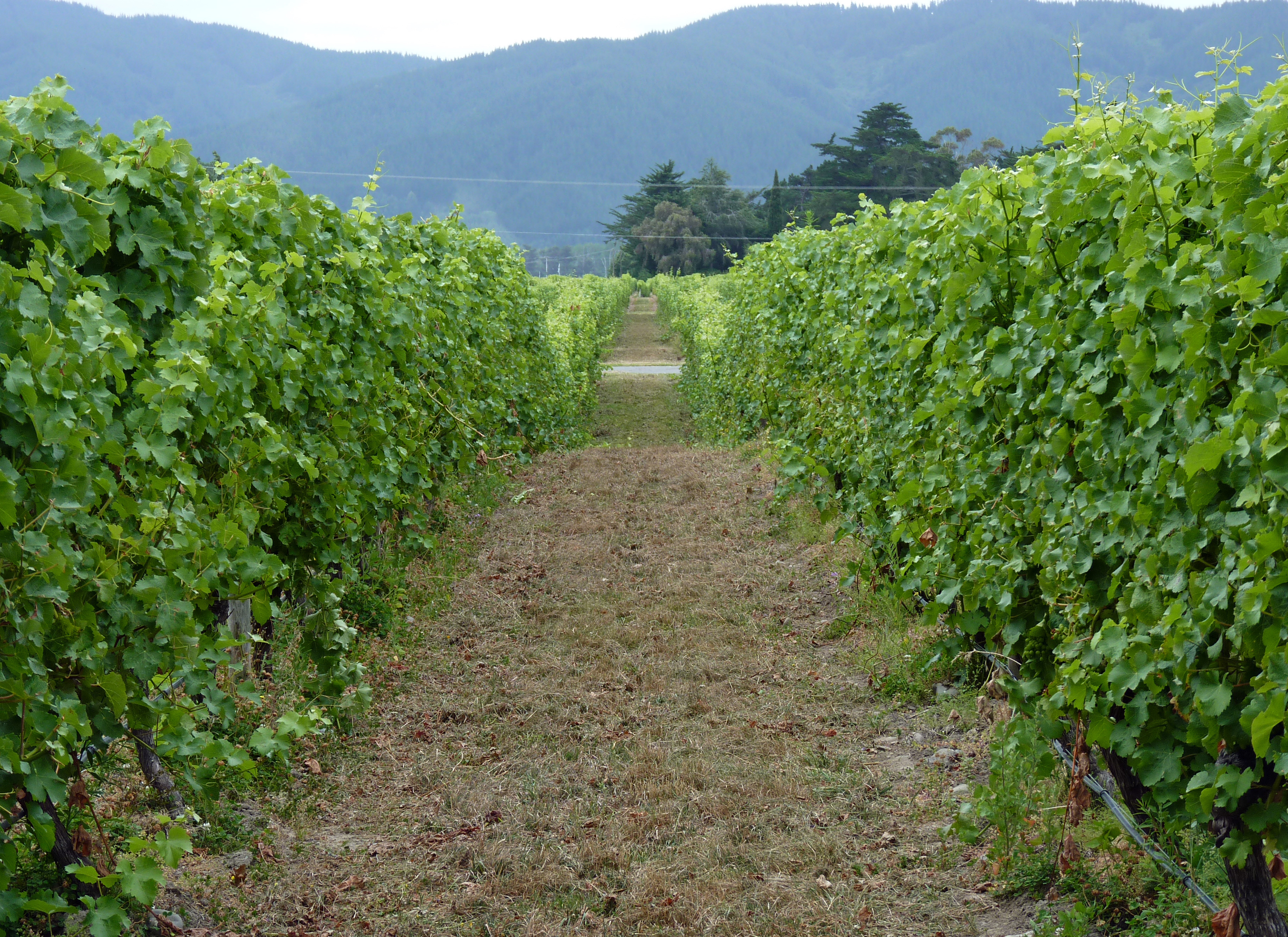
Cloudy Bay Vineyard

Cloudy Bay winery was established in 1985 by David Hohnen, the founder of Margaret River winery Cape Mentelle Vineyards. The winery was named after Cloudy Bay, the stretch of coast named by James Cook during his voyage to New Zealand in 1770.

The winery brought New Zealand Sauvignon Blanc to world-wide attention in the 1980s when its first vintages were reviewed by British wine writer Oz Clarke, who wrote that New Zealand Sauvignon Blanc is “arguably the best in the world”. Wine writer George Taber recounts that Cloudy Bay is “what many people consider to be the world's best Sauvignon Blanc.” In 2003, Hohnen sold his remaining shares of Cloudy Bay Vineyards to Veuve Clicquot, bringing the winery under the full ownership of multinational luxury goods firm LVMH Moët Hennessy Louis Vuitton. In 2014 it acquired its own Central Otago vineyards, its first expansion outside of Marlborough, by purchasing the Northburn Station vineyards and cellar door.

== Location ==
The Cloudy Bay winery buildings are located in Marlborough’s Wairau Valley, approximately 8 kilometres north-west of Blenheim. Cellar doors are located at the winery in Marlborough and at Northburn Station in Central Otago.

== Wines produced ==
The winery is primarily noted for its Sauvignon Blanc wines, the first New Zealand wines to be exported in the 1980s, and still represent the majority of its production. The “Te Koko” Sauvignon Blanc is a wild-ferment, barrel-aged version that contrasts with the fruit-driven unoaked style of the original. The winery also produces Chardonnay, the “Pelorus” sparkling méthode traditionnelle and its “Te Wahi” Pinot Noir from Central Otago.

== See also ==
- Cloudy Bay
