= Deutz (wine) =

Champagne producer in France

Coordinates: 49.0568539°N 4.0012705°E

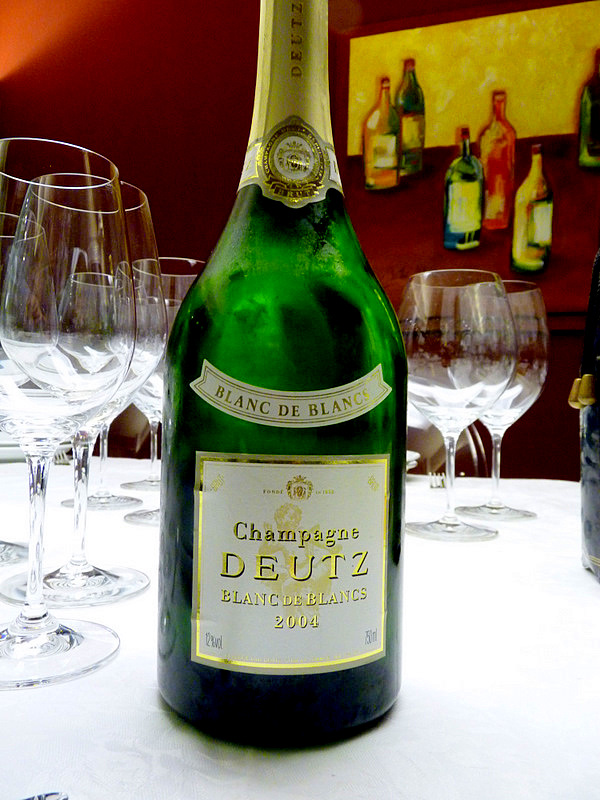
A Blanc de blancs vintage Champagne from Deutz.

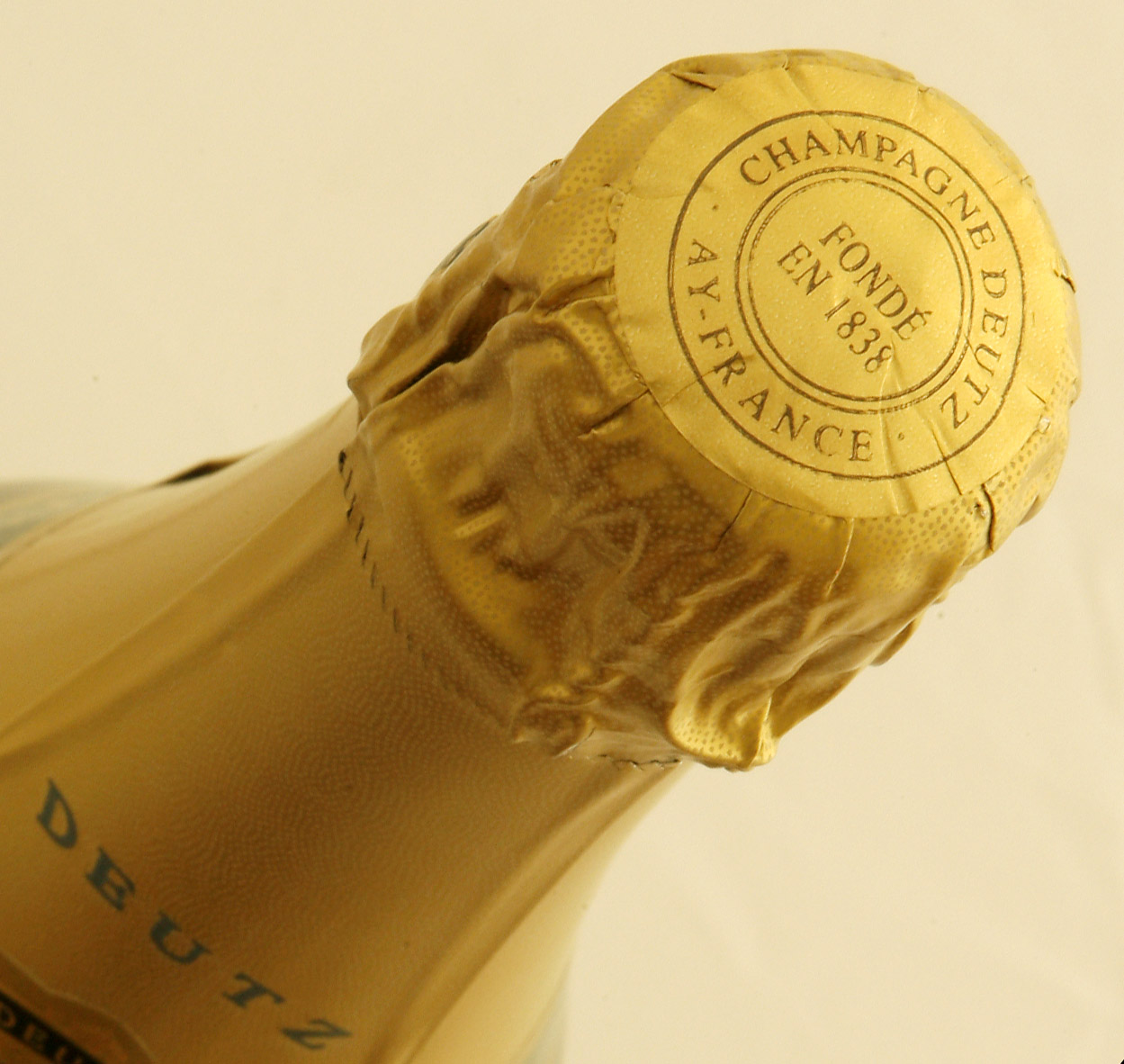
Champagne Deutz seal noting its year of founding

Deutz, formerly known as Deutz & Geldermann, is a Champagne producer based in the Aÿ region of Champagne. The house was founded in 1838 by William Deutz and Pierre-Hubert Geldermann and has since been run by successive generations of the Deutz and Geldermann families.

== History ==
Throughout its early history Deutz was one of the most popular Champagne Brands in the UK, exporting almost 600,000 bottles at its peak. Today the main markets are domestic.

In 1983, the house was acquired by the Rouzaud family, who also own Louis Roederer which helped restore the house to better financial footing. Deutz owns holding in the Bordeaux wine estate of Chateau Vernous and the Rhone estate of Delas Freres. In 1988, Deutz formed a partnership with New Zealand producer Montana Wines to make sparkling wines in the Marlborough wine region of New Zealand. Since 1993, the estate has been part of the Louis Roederer portfolio of wineries, which also include the Bordeaux wine estate of Château de Pez. In the early 1990s, Deutz partnered with Beringer Wine Estates and a San Luis Obispo landowner to form the Californian sparkling wine producer Maison Deutz. By 1997, the estate wasn't producing the financial results that Deutz and Beringer were expecting and their interest in the company was sold to the Californian winemaker who rebranded the wine as Laetitia.

== Deutz Portfolio ==
- Deutz Brut Classic NV
- Deutz Rosé NV
- Deutz Vintage
- Deutz Rosé Vintage
- Deutz Blanc de Blancs Vintage
- Cuvée William Deutz
- Amour de Deutz Blanc de Blanc
- Amour de Deutz Rosé
- Hommage à William Deutz

== See also ==
- Champagne Riots of 1911
- List of champagne producers
