= Central Otago wine region =

Wine region in New Zealand

Central Otago
- Wine region
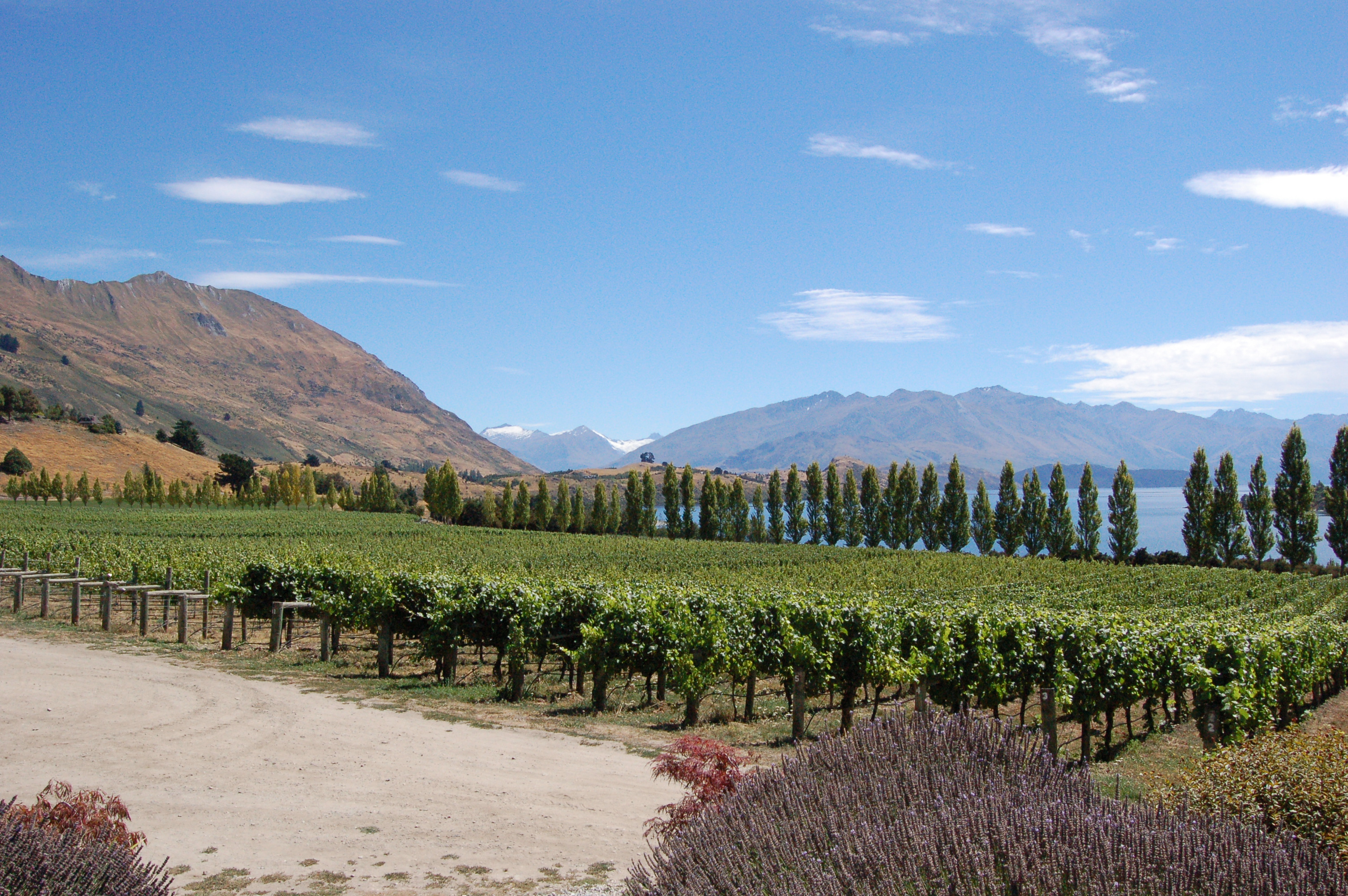
- Rippon vineyard by Lake Wānaka, Central Otago
- Type: Geographical Indication
- Year established: 2018
- Country: New Zealand
- Sub-regions: Bannockburn, Bendigo, Wānaka, Gibbston Valley, Cromwell, Alexandra
- Size of planted vineyards: 1,956 hectares (4,830 acres)
- Grapes produced: Pinot Noir, Chardonnay, Riesling, Pinot Gris
- No. of wineries: 133
- Comments: Data source: New Zealand Winegrowers, 2020

The Central Otago wine region is a geographical indication in New Zealand's South Island, and the world's southernmost commercial wine growing region. While Central Otago is best known for Pinot Noir, many white wine varieties are also popular.

== History of the wine region ==
Significant European occupation in this region started with the Otago gold rush in the 1860s. French immigrant gold miner Jean Desire Feraud soon started planting vines and embarking upon small-scale commercial wine production, even winning medals in Australian wine competitions. Late in the nineteenth century, the New Zealand government hired Romeo Bragato to survey the country. While this early experimentation showed the wine-growing potential of the region, the wine industry did not survive for long on a commercial basis.

From the 1950s through to the late 1970s, there were many small-scale trial plantings of vines by private individuals and under the auspices of the New Zealand Department of Agriculture. By 1980 enough experience and confidence had been gained for commercial plantings to start.

Vineyard planting and production remained modest until the middle of the 1990s when the industry began to expand rapidly. In 1996 there were just 11 wineries in the Central Otago region, according to New Zealand Winegrowers, accounting for 4.6% of the national total. By 2020 this had risen to 133 wineries and 18.5%. Over the same period, the area planted with vines rose from 92 to 1,930 hectares, a more-than twentyfold increase. Reflecting this rapid expansion, the long lead-time for planting to come into production, and the focus in Central Otago on quality wines rather than bulk wines, actual wine production accounted for only 0.5% (376 tonnes) of the New Zealand total in 1996, increasing to 3.0% (11,868 tonnes) in 2019.

Central Otago annual harvest (1994–2025), in thousand tonnes of grapes crushed.
Sources: Otago Daily Times, New Zealand Winegrowers annual reports. View source data.

== Climate and soil ==
Alexandra

Climate chart (precipitation, max. and min. temperature)
J	F	M	A	M	J	J	A	S	O	N	D
50 25 11	24 25 10	29 22 7	22 18 4	27 14 2	32 9 −2	24 8 −2	18 13 −1	21 16 2	29 19 4	31 21 7	45 23 9
- █ Average max. and min. temperatures in °C
- █ Precipitation totals in mm
- Source: NIWA.
Imperial conversion
J	F	M	A	M	J	J	A	S	O	N	D
2 77 51	0.9 77 50	1.1 72 45	0.9 64 39	1.1 56 35	1.2 48 29	1 47 28	0.7 55 31	0.8 62 36	1.1 66 40	1.2 70 44	1.8 74 49
- █ Average max. and min. temperatures in °F
- █ Precipitation totals in inches

At around 300 metres (980 ft) elevation, Central Otago's vineyards are protected from New Zealand's characteristic maritime climate by high mountains up to 3,700 metres (12,100 ft) high. They thus have the only true continental climate zone in the country, with large daily and seasonal temperature extremes. Rainfall averages around 375–600 millimetres (14.8–23.6 in): summer is hot and relatively dry, and often accompanied by the Nor'wester foehn wind; autumn is short, cool and sunny; and winter is cold, with substantial falls of snow. Heavy frosts are common throughout winter and, indeed, frost can occur at any time between March and November. One of Central Otago's warmest wine growing areas can be found just north of the Lowburn Inlet area.

The climatic contrast between Central Otago and the more humid, warmer wine regions of the North Island can be illustrated by the difference in the timing of the grape harvest. In the more northerly vineyards, picking generally takes place in late February or early March, while in Central Otago the harvest begins in mid to late April — a difference of some six to seven weeks.

The structure of the soil also differs considerably from other wine growing regions of the country, with heavy deposits of rough-edged mica and other metamorphic schists in silt loams. This soil drains easily, and given that most vineyards are positioned on hillside slopes, artificial irrigation is generally essential.

In 2025, Central Otago Winegrowers Association wrote to the Prime Minister expressing concern over the potential impact to the industry from the proposed open-pit goldmine in the Bendigo region, highlighting the threats of contamination, reputational harm and long-term damage.

== Central Otago's wines ==
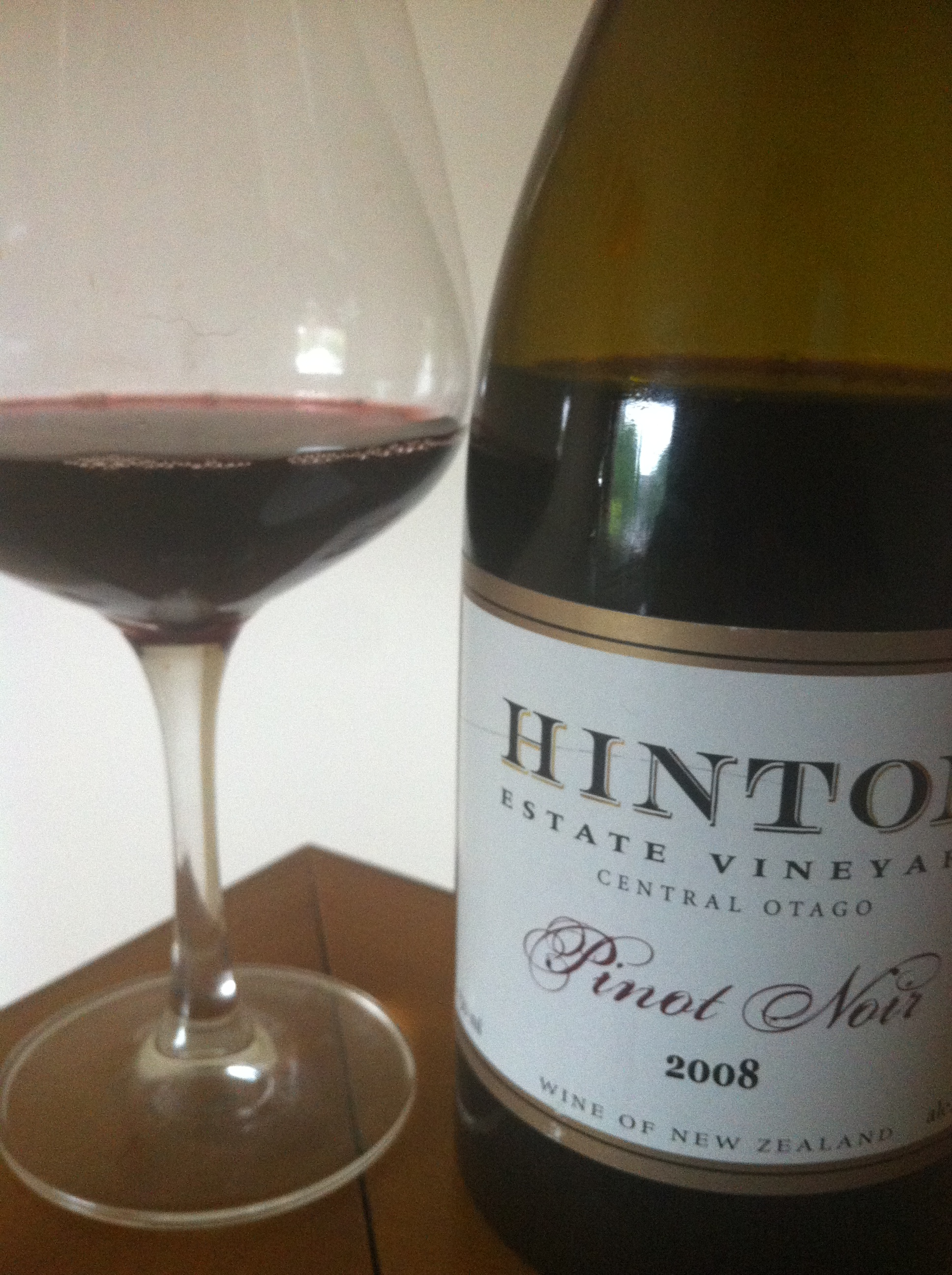
Pinot noir from Central Otago

Pinot noir is the leading grape variety in Central Otago, estimated to account for over 80% of plantings. The other 20% of production comes from Chardonnay, Sauvignon blanc, Riesling, Pinot gris, and Gewürztraminer. Sparkling wine is made in the traditional style from Pinot noir and Chardonnay grapes.

== Sub-regions ==
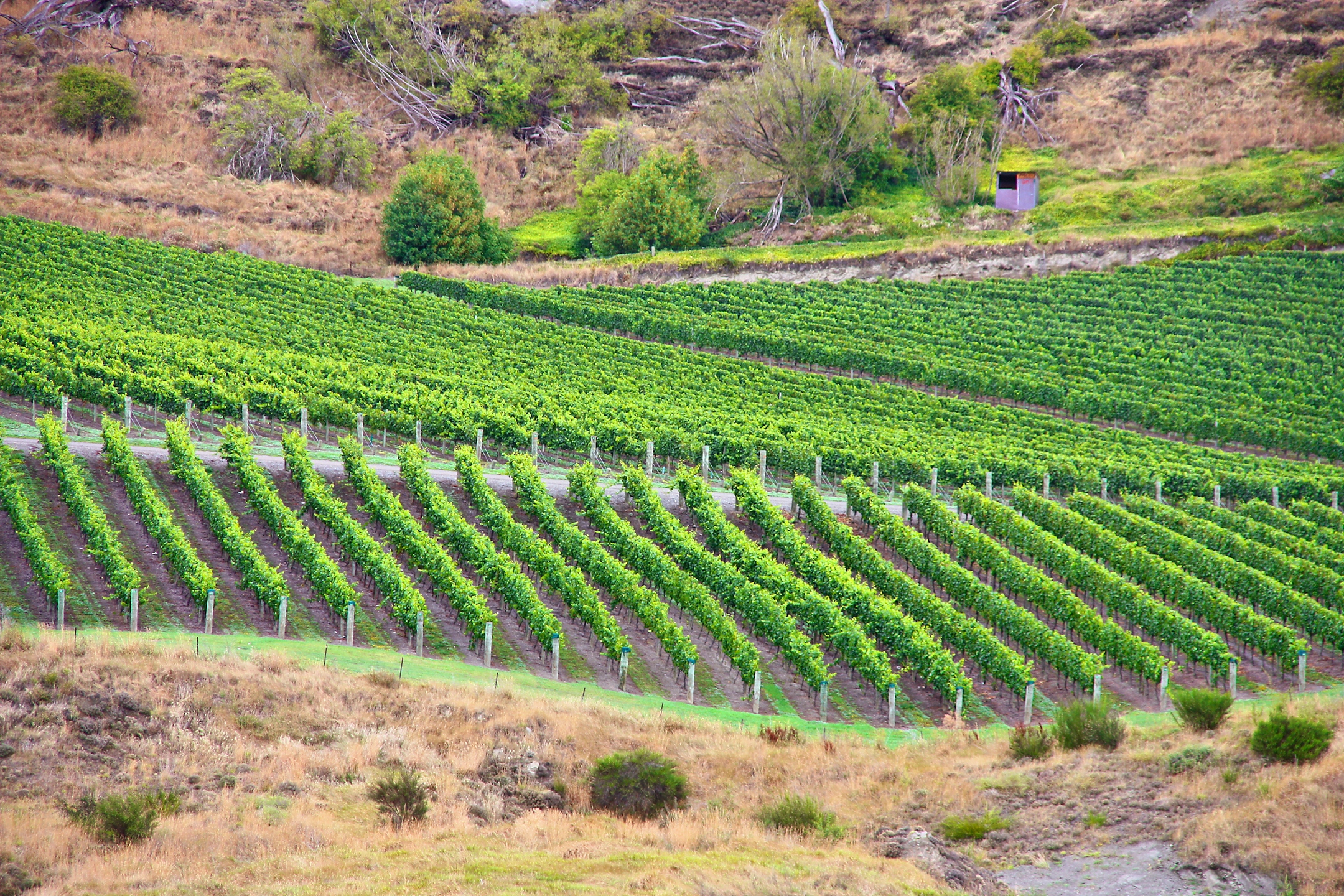
A vineyard in Gibbston valley

The Central Otago wine region is broken into multiple sub-regions, each with its own climate and characteristics.

- Bannockburn is a small Geographical Indication on the southern banks of the Kawarau River near Cromwell and is a very warm area that was known by gold miners as "the Heart of the Desert". Grapes ripen early on sandy, silty loam soils. The elevation ranges from 220 to 370 metres (720 to 1,210 ft).
- Bendigo lies east of the Clutha River / Mata-Au and Lake Dunstan, with grapes planted at both medium elevation (220 metres (720 ft)) and high elevation terraces (330 to 350 metres (1,080 to 1,150 ft)). This warm area has semi arid soils at variable depths, with free draining soils at the lower levels and shallower soils at higher elevations.
- Tarras, on the eastern banks of the Clutha River / Mata-Au, includes the vineyards at Maori Point.
- Gibbston is a tight valley enclosed by mountainous terrain. About 250 hectares of vines are planted on sloping land on the southern bank of the Kawarau River. Gibbston is the coolest and highest of the sub-regions with vineyards between 320 and 420 metres (1,050 and 1,380 ft) altitude. It is sometimes referred to as the Queenstown subregion.
- Wānaka, the smallest of the sub-regions, has vineyards planted between the banks of Lake Wānaka and the town of Luggate to the east. Ranging between 290 to 320 metres (950 to 1,050 ft) above sea level, the vineyards have a similar but slightly warmer climate than those at Gibbston.
- The Alexandra Basin is surrounded by the Clutha River / Mata-Au and Manuherikia River and regularly records New Zealand's hottest summer temperatures. Schist outcrops dominate the arid landscape. A wide diurnal shift moderates the high temperatures.
- The Cromwell Basin contains the highest concentration of vines, in an area bounded by the Kawarau River, Lake Dunstan and the Pisa mountain range. It is a warm district characterised by semi arid, high terraces and moraines and gently sloping fans.

== Bibliography ==
- Cooper, Michael (1993). The Wines and Vineyards of New Zealand (4th ed.). Auckland: Hodder & Stoughton. ISBN 0-340-57570-0. OL 1507856M. Wikidata Q114772405.
