= Pegasus Bay Vineyards =

Winery in North Canterbury, New Zealand

Pegasus Bay
- Location: Waipara, New Zealand
- Coordinates: 43.092947°S 172.768400°E
- Wine region: North Canterbury
- Founded: 1986; 39 years ago
- Varietals: Riesling, Chardonnay, Pinot Noir, Pinot Gris, Sémillon, Gewürztraminer
- Tasting: Open to the public
- Website: Official website

Pegasus Bay is a family owned and operated vineyard and winery based in Waipara, New Zealand.

Pegasus Bay winery is the second largest winery in Canterbury and considered within the New Zealand wine industry as a standard setter for the industry in the region and rated 'Canterburys top winery' by Michael Cooper in the Wine Atlas of New Zealand 2003. The winery was set up by Ivan Donaldson in 1986 and run by his family. Mr Donaldson is also the wine columnist for The Press newspaper in Christchurch.

== Wine styles ==
Pegusus Bay produce:

- Sauvignon blanc/Semillon
- Pinot noir
- Merlot Cabernet
- Riesling
- Chardonnay

== See also ==
- New Zealand wine
- Pegasus Bay

== Sources ==
- Fine wines of New Zealand
- Pegasus Bay Vineyards
- Winestate Magazine
