= Auckland wine region =

Wine region in New Zealand

Auckland
- Wine region
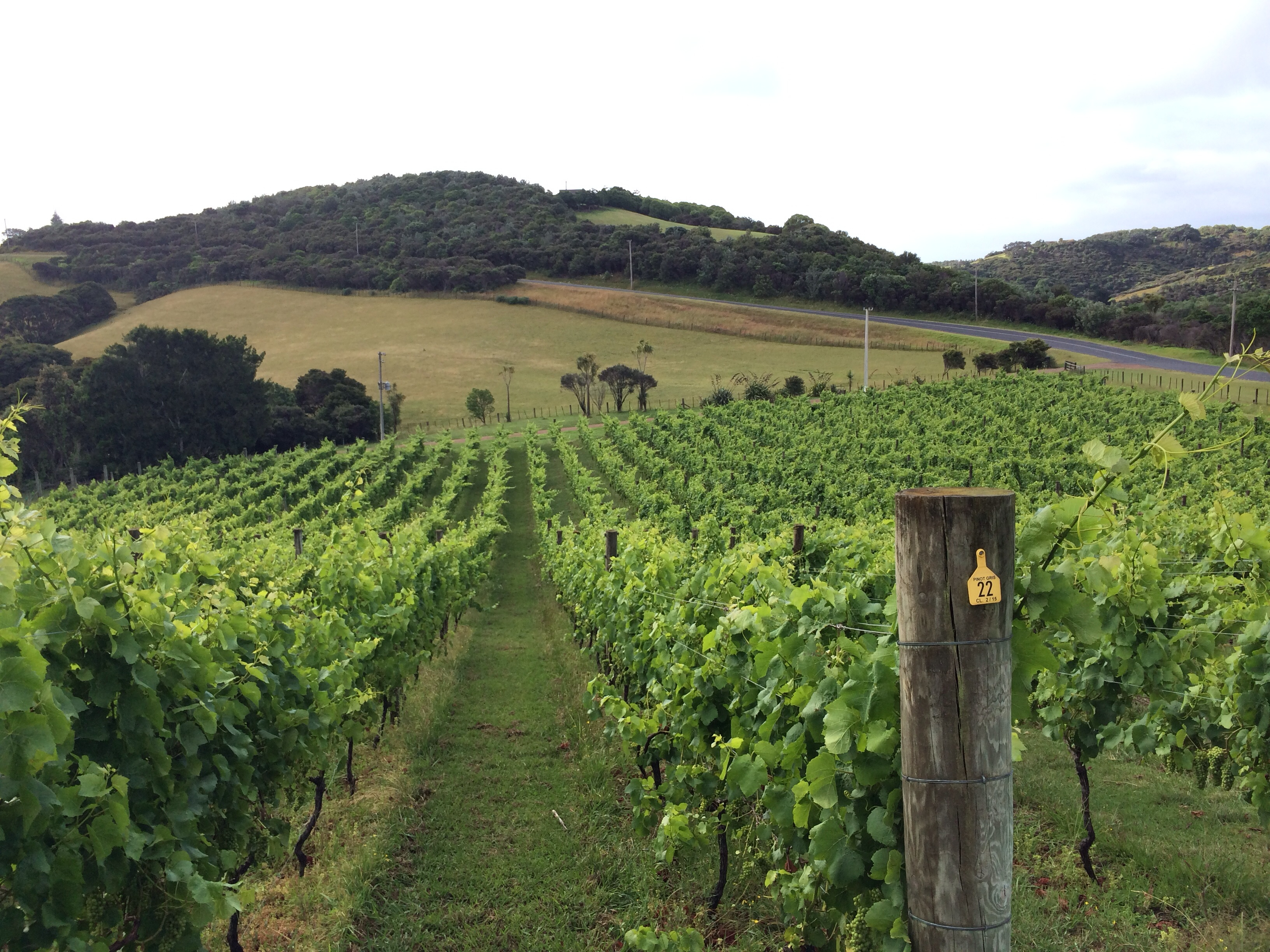
- Vineyards on Waiheke Island, New Zealand
- Type: Geographical Indication
- Year established: Late 19th century; GI established 2018
- Country: New Zealand
- Sub-regions: Matakana; Kumeū; Waiheke Island
- Climate region: II
- Size of planted vineyards: 269 ha (660 acres)
- No. of vineyards: 85
- Grapes produced: 613 t (1,351,000 lb)
- Varietals produced: Bourdeaux red varieties; Chardonnay; Syrah; Pinot Gris
- No. of wineries: 95
- Comments: Data source: New Zealand Winegrowers, 2024

The Auckland wine region is a New Zealand wine-growing area and geographical indication centred around New Zealand's largest city, Auckland. The GI covers the area delineated by the greater Auckland Region, and has a total vineyard area in 2024 of 269 hectares (660 acres).

== History ==
Dalmatian immigrants arriving in New Zealand in the late 19th and early 20th centuries brought with them viticultural knowledge and planted vineyards in West and North Auckland. Typically, their vineyards produced table wine and fortified wine to suit the palates of their communities.

== Climate and geography ==
Soils are usually either heavy clay, or volcanic-derived soils. On average, it is the warmest of New Zealand's vine-growing areas.

== Regions ==
There are three sub-regions within Auckland established as geographical indications: Waiheke Island, Kumeū, and Matakana. In recent years, the hotter temperatures are allowing Auckland winemakers (for example Omaha Bay, Cooper's Creek, Heron's Flight, Matavino, and Obsidian) to experiment with Italian and Spanish grape varieties, such as Albariño, Montepulciano, Sangiovese, Dolcetto, Temperanillo, and even Nebbiolo.

=== Waiheke Island ===
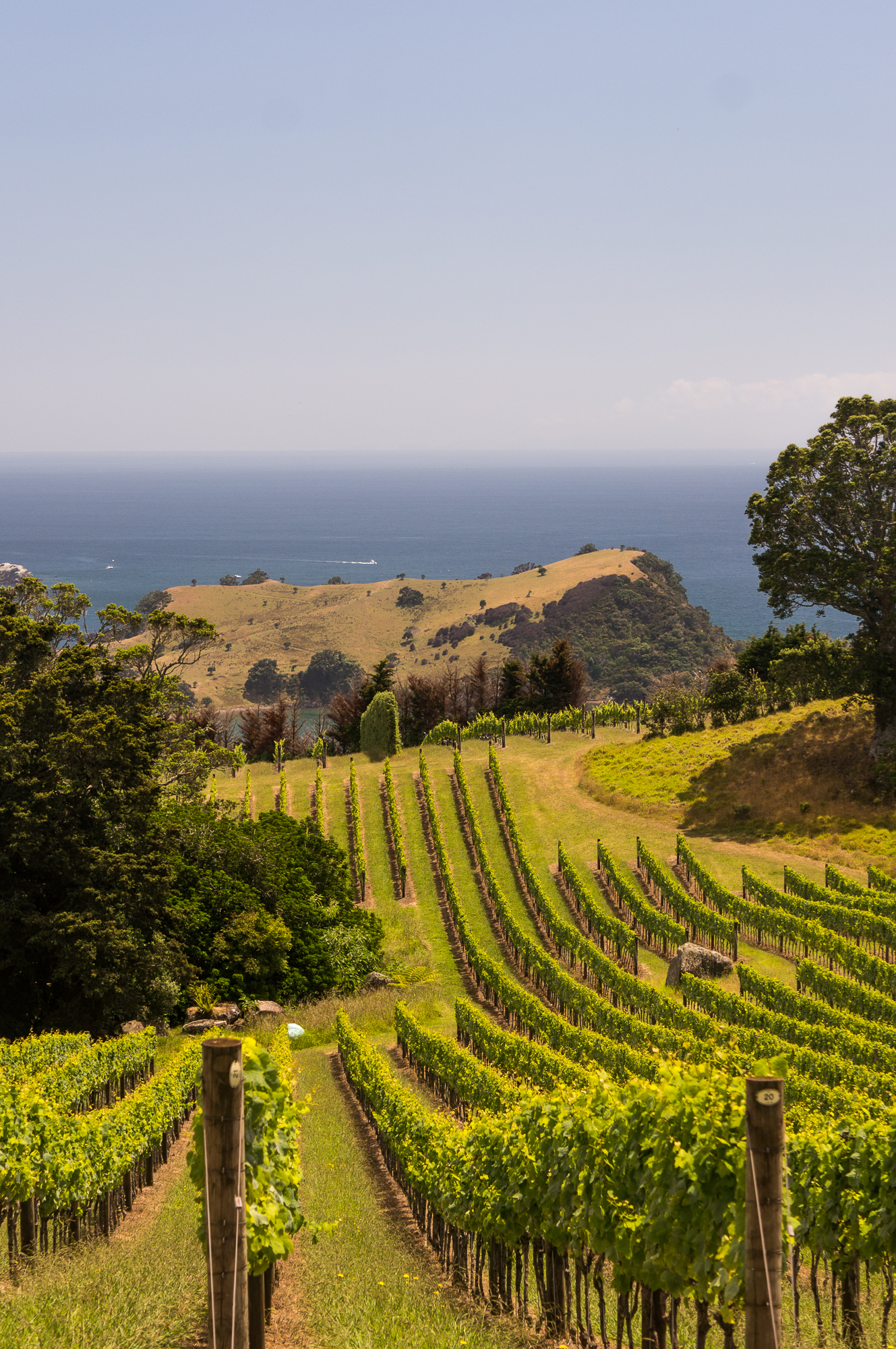
A Man O' War vineyard on Waiheke Island, looking out over the Hauraki Gulf.

Waiheke Island, just off the east coast of Auckland in the Hauraki Gulf, has a dry and warm mesoclimate and is planted primarily in French red grape varieties: Syrah, Merlot, Cabernet Sauvignon, and Chardonnay. The Bordeaux style red wines that are produced are considered to be significantly ripe and full bodied, and some of the best in New Zealand. The island's very small area of 92 square kilometres (36 sq mi) constrains wineries to a small boutique scale.

=== Kumeū ===
The Geographical Indication of Kumeū is a small sub-region west of Auckland City, surrounding the towns of Huapai and Kumeū, as far west as Waimauku, and east to the southern edge of the town of Riverhead. The area is most notable for its excellent Chardonnay, with well reviewed examples especially from Kumeū River and Soljans Estate Winery. Chardonnay makes up 85% of the vineyard area in Kumeū, with Pinot Gris and Pinot Noir making up most of the remainder. Some of New Zealand's oldest wineries are in Kumeū, established in the late 1800s by Croatian settlers working the Kauri gum fields. Some of these, such as Montana Wines (now Brancott Estate), Babich, Nobilo, and Cooper's Creek are now among New Zealand's largest wineries, having extended their operations throughout the rest of New Zealand.

=== Matakana ===
Matakana is a small Geographical Indication and sub-region of the Auckland GI, situated about 60 kilometres (37 mi) north of Auckland City around the towns of Warkworth and Matakana. It extends from Mahurangi Harbour in the south, and as far north as Leigh, although most of the vineyards are clustered in the hills and valleys between Warkworth and Matakana. The area has a warm mesoclimate protected from prevailing winds by hills to the north and west, and a maritime influence from Ōmaha Bay and Kawau Bay. Matakana wineries are mostly small, family-run or "lifestyle" vineyards, with very small plots and non-commercial production volumes, usually dry-farmed on north-facing hill slopes.

Winemaking began in Matakana in the 1960s, but the oldest, current vineyards are Heron's Flight (established 1988), Providence Wines, and Ransom Wines, established in the early 1990s. Around the turn of the century, Heron's Flight replanted its mainly Bordeaux varieties with the Italian varieties Sangiovese and Dolcetto, and many of the newer wineries, have also planted Tannat and Petit Verdot alongside the usual French varieties, as well as the Italian and Spanish varieties Barbera, Nebbiolo, Albariño, Roussanne, and Montepulciano. As of the 2017 vintage, there were more than 65 hectares (160 acres) planted in vines, and 21 commercial grape growing/winery operations within the Matakana GI.

== Viticulture and winemaking ==
Grape varieties planted in Auckland in 2024 by vineyard area, total 269 hectares (660 acres).
1. Chardonnay (23.9%)
2. Syrah (18.0%)
3. Pinot Gris (11.8%)
4. Merlot (11.3%)
5. Cabernet Sauvignon (6.50%)
6. Cabernet Franc (6.30%)
7. Malbec (4.10%)
8. Other (18.1%)
Data from New Zealand Winegrowers 2024 vineyard report.

Overall, the region's most planted variety is Chardonnay, which accounts for nearly a quarter of the vineyard area. Auckland wineries produce some of New Zealand's finest Chardonnay white wines. British wine writer Jancis Robinson and others frequently rank Kumeu River Chardonnay with the finest white Burgundy wines such as Montrachet. The next-most planted varieties are Syrah and Pinot Gris. Taken together, the red varieties Merlot, Cabernet Franc, Cabernet Sauvignon, and Malbec make up a slightly larger proportion than Chardonnay of 28.2 percent in 2024, which produce Auckland's well regarded Bordeaux-style wines.
