= Seifried Family Winegrowers =

New Zealand winery and vineyard

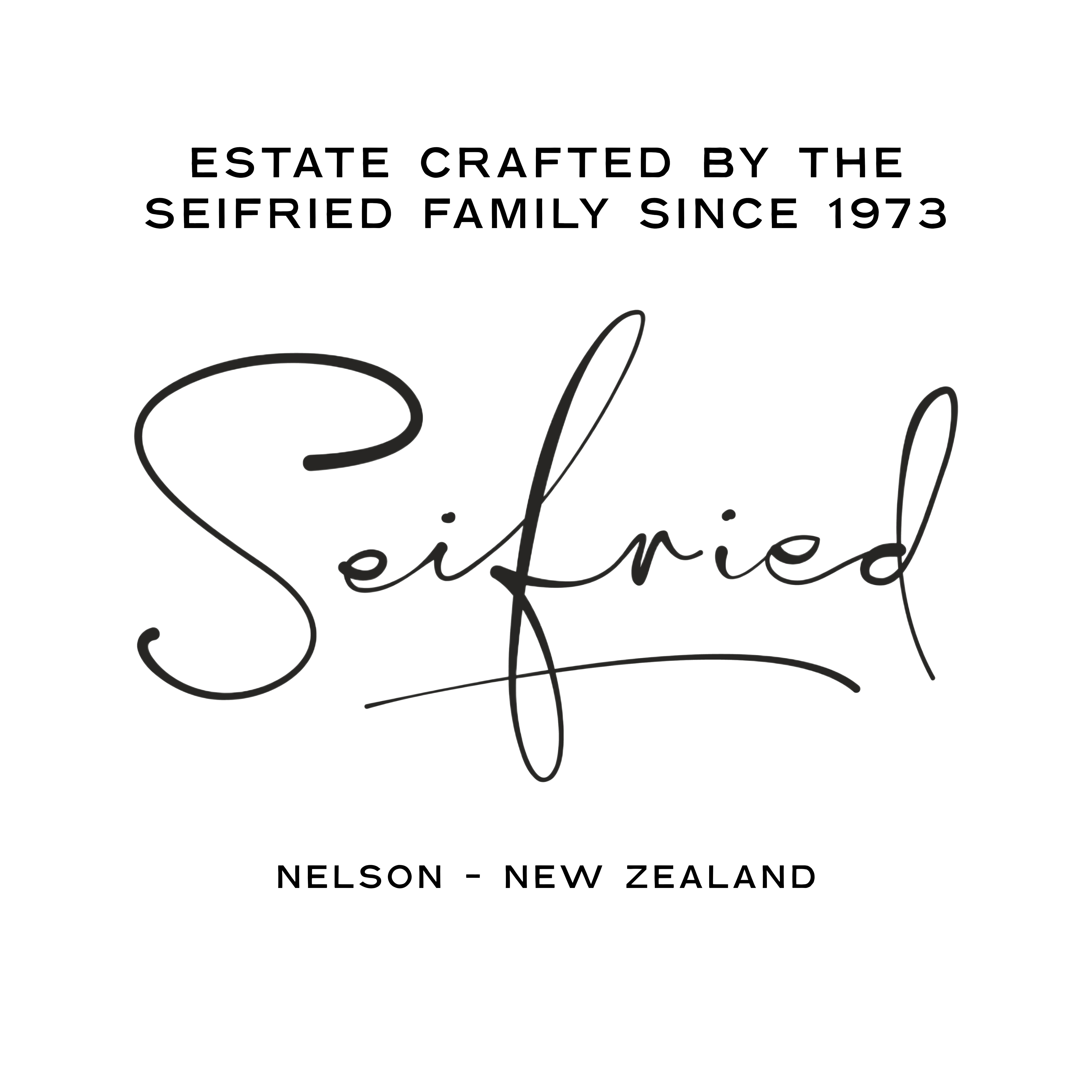
- Location: Nelson, New Zealand, New Zealand
- Wine region: Nelson, New Zealand
- Founded: 1973; 53 years ago
- Varietals: Sauvignon Blanc, Pinot Noir, Chardonnay, Pinot Gris, Gewürztraminer, Riesling, Würzer, Syrah, Cabernet Franc
- Tasting: Open to the public
- Website: www.seifried.co.nz

Seifried Family Winegrowers is a family owned winery and vineyard based in Nelson, New Zealand. The winery was founded by Hermann Seifried and his wife Agnes in 1973 as a part time business, and is now recognised as the South Island's oldest commercial vineyard.

Using grapes harvested from estate grown, ‘Sustainably Accredited’ (Sustainable Winegrowing New Zealand – SWNZ) vineyards scattered throughout the Nelson region, this is now a second-generation wine producer, with siblings Heidi, Chris and Anna now working alongside their parents in various management positions within the family business.

Seifried Family Winegrowers farms over 330 hectares of vines across 10 vineyard locations around the Nelson region, and exports wine around the world. Seifried Family Winegrowers has gained a reputation for lesser known varieties including Grüner Veltliner, Zweigelt, and Würzer – a rare German grape variety for which Seifried are the only NZ producer.

In September 2014, Hermann and Agnes Seifried were acknowledged for their contributions to New Zealand wine and inducted as Fellows of New Zealand Winegrowers. They are the first husband and wife team to be inducted and the first for a woman.

== Wines ==
Seifried Family Winegrowers produces wines under a range of brands including:

- Seifried – premium estate label
- Aotea – single estate grown
- Old Coach Road
- Rabbit Island.

Seifried Family Winegrowers produces wine styles that include Sauvignon Blanc, Chardonnay, Pinot Gris,Pinot Noir, Syrah, Cabernet Franc, Riesling, Gewürztraminer, & Merlot. They also produce lesser known varieties including Grüner Veltliner, Zweigelt and Würzer.

== Wineries ==
Seifried Cellar Door is located at the winery in Appleby.

== In popular culture ==
- Seifried Family Winegrowers was one of the wineries feature in the 2019 documentary A Seat at the Table by David Nash and Simon Mark-Brown.
- They have also featured on the well-known New Zealand television series, Country Calendar – first in 1983, then again 2012.
