= Romeo Bragato =

New Zealand winemaker

Alessandro Romeo Bragato (1859–1913) played a significant role in the development of the wine industry in Australia and New Zealand.

== Early life and career ==
Romeo Bragato was born fourth in a family of ten children to Giuseppe and Paolina Bragato on 26 February 1859 in the harbor town of Lussinpiccolo now Mali Lošinj on the Adriatic island of Lussin (now Lošinj). At that time it was part of the Austrian Empire but is now part of Croatia. His mother Paolina (née Depangher) was Austrian from Vienna. Bragato's early education was at Pirano (Piran) south of Trieste on Istria and at a technical school there. According to his family, Bragato then trained as an architect in Vienna and from 1879 to 1883 attended the Regia Scuola di Viticoltura ed Enelogia in Conegliano in the heart of the Veneto wine region. Bragato graduated in 1883 and returned to Lussinpiccolo where for a year he was an oenologist at the Provincial Association of Agriculture and later from 1 January 1885 until 1888 viticulturist and cellar master for the Jerolimic brothers.

== Time in Australia ==
Bragato arrived in Melbourne in Victoria, Australia on the Hohenzollen on 31 August 1888. On 19 September before the Royal Commission on Vegetable Products he outlined a scheme of education and development for the Victorian wine industry. He visited the Rutherglen district and met with the vine growers there. He worked the 1889 vintage voluntarily with Hans Irvine at Great Western where he made 10,000 gallons of wine. In November, 1889, he was appointed the Colonial Government's Viticultural Expert and began to tour vineyards, publishing reports in the Board of Viticulture's Journal. For ten years the affable and popular Bragato was Victoria's wine expert providing support for the emerging industry along with protective tariffs, planting bonuses and other incentives. But with fellow junior experts Giovanni Federli and François de Castella dismissed in retrenchments following economic downturn in 1892 only Bragato remained to advise the legion of newcomer vignerons brought in on a wave of enthusiasm for the industry and with the promise of bonuses for new plantings.

Bragato's advocacy was conducted in situ and accompanied by field demonstrations of planting and pruning. He typically recommended growers plant Shiraz (Syrah) mixed with Cabernet Sauvignon, perhaps also Malbec or Mataro (Mouvedre). The mainly British derived population of the Australian colonies were not yet wine drinkers in the European manner, so Bragato anticipated the produce of these vines would be mainly for export. Fortunately, the rich, soft dry red wine produced by the warmer Australian areas and known as Australian Burgundy suited the English market. Its competitors were not the fine red wines of Burgundy but equivalent hot and warmer climate styles from South of France, Algeria and other New World locations. Domestic consumers would later enjoy the fruits of Bragato's advice. Bragato was also sensitive to differences of climate and terroir and brought his Italian derived tastes into play. At southerly and similarly cool Geelong recommending Shiraz, Cabernet, Dolcetto and Pinot Noir in the reds with White Hermitage (Marsanne], Riesling and Pineau Blanc (Chardonnay) in the whites. Bragato championed new regions, assisting vignerons in the Avoca and Moonambel district now known as the Pyrenees (Victoria). Other vineyards that Bragato encouraged, such as Dawson's Glenlinton at Whittlesea continued producing fine wines for a generation or more afterwards, the taste and memory of which helped to seed revival of the wine industry in Victoria in the post 1945-era.

Bragato was an early advocate of a viticultural and wine making college for Victoria. The idea languished in the economically depressed years of the early 1890s. But was pushed to a conclusion at Rutherglen after 1894 when the rival Bendigo vineyards were discovered to be infested with phylloxera. They were subsequently destroyed under the Victorian government's draconian eradicationist policies enacted with agreement from the other wine growing colonies of South Australia and New South Wales. Working with the Victorian Public Works Department, Bragato designed a model winery and cellars attached to the Rutherglen Viticultural College, which opened in 1897 on 1,000 acres of land to the south of Rutherglen.

Bragato was bitterly disappointed when passed over as principal of the college. He then considered his situation intolerable when placed subordinate to a new choice of expert imported to tackle phylloxera, the 26-year old Montpellier-trained Frenchman Raymond Dubois. By 1897 Bragato was openly claiming that "Phylloxera will never be eradicated from Victoria and that our experience will very likely be like that of France, Spain, Italy and other vine growing countries in Europe." By this stage he had joined forces with international opinion and was an advocating the importation of phylloxera-resistant American vines and planting on the rootstocks. Considerable resistance remained from established vignerons to American vines and official policy still favoured the eradication of affected vineyards. When Phylloxera was discovered in Rutherglen vineyards in 1899 the Minister for Agriculture, J. W. Taverner, forced Bragato's resignation. It was widely accepted that Bragato was made the scapegoat for phylloxera. Eradicationist policy was effectively abandoned after the Rutherglen outbreak. It was seen subsequently as a factor in the destruction of Victoria's nineteenth century wine industry, which had been the most extensive of the Australian colonies.

== Time in New Zealand ==
In New Zealand the 1894 Flax and Other Industries Committee recommended the establishment of a Department of Agriculture. The committee received considerable lobbying from the developing wine industry. As a consequence of this lobbying, Premier Richard Seddon requested the loan of the services of Romeo Bragato from the Victorian Government in 1895. Bragato arrived in Bluff, and was escorted by government officials to assess prospects for viticulture and wine making in New Zealand. His resulting report ‘Prospects of Viticulture in New Zealand’ submitted to the Premier on 10th Sept, was very positive and became important in promoting the development of the young wine industry. His report recommended:

- regions suitable for viticulture
- formation of district associations
- importation of phylloxera resistant vines for grafting

In 1897, Mr. W.J. Palmer, Government Pomologist, planted grapes at the Waerenga (Te Kauwhata) Experimental Station, including: Cabernet Sauvignon, Pinot noir, Pinot Meunier, Chardonnay, Syrah, Riesling, Pinot blanc and Malbec In 1898, Bragato returned to New Zealand and identifies phylloxera in the Auckland vineyards of Mr Dridgman and Mr Harding of Mt Eden Road, Auckland. He recommended importation of phylloxera resistant cuttings from Europe to counter phylloxera In 1901, Bragato returned to report on the presence of phylloxera, persuading the Government to import phylloxera resistant vines and rootstocks from California and France. He also visits Waerenga Experimental Station In 1902, Bragato accepts the post offered the previous year as Government Viticulturist for the New Zealand Department of Agriculture. In this role Bragato:

- imports disease resistant stocks distributing them for grafting
- begins experimental winemaking at the expanded Waerenga Station
- takes control of government vineyards in Hawkes Bay and Tauranga
- organises field days for growers and prospective growers at Waerenga

In 1906, Bragato published ‘Viticulture in New Zealand’ In 1908, five wines from the Te Kauwhata Experimental Station won gold medals at the Franco-British wine exhibition. Despite this success official support for the Division of Viticulture began to wither due to the growth of the Temperance Movement The Viticultural Division of the Department of Agriculture was disbanded in 1909 and Romeo Bragato, frustrated and disillusioned, leaves New Zealand.

== Later life, death and legacy ==
In 1912, Bragato and his family, wife Laura and daughter Miriam, left New Zealand for Canada. Bragato died in Vancouver, British Columbia, Canada on 13 December 1913, from natural causes.

In 2002, Bragato was posthumously inducted into the New Zealand Business Hall of Fame.

The Bragato Research Institute in New Zealand is named after him.

== See also ==
- Australian Wine
- Bragato Research Institute
- New Zealand wine
- Phylloxera
- List of wine personalities
