= George M. Taber =

American journalist and entrepreneur

George McCaffrey Taber (born May 25, 1942) is a journalist and entrepreneur.

Taber was a reporter and editor with Time magazine in the United States and Europe for 21 years, working in Brussels; Bonn; Houston; Washington, DC; and New York. Stationed in Paris between 1973 and 1976, he reported extensively on French wine and cooking, including a Time cover story on chef Michel Guérard and his nouvelle cuisine.

It was during that period that he reported on the Judgment of Paris where California wines were ranked alongside France's best, an event that revolutionized the world of wine. His four-paragraph story about the tasting has been called "the most significant news story ever written about wine". In 2005, Taber wrote a book on the event, with the goal of "setting the record straight".

In 2012, Taber organized a blind tasting on behalf of the American Association of Wine Economists similar to the 1976 Judgment of Paris event between wines produced in France and several produced in New Jersey. This event at the association's conference in Princeton has been called the Judgment of Princeton.

Taber began his own business newspaper in 1988 and interviewed and wrote about the presidents of both the United States and France.

== Bibliography ==
- Taber, George M. "Modern Living: Judgement of Paris". Time, June 7, 1976.
- Taber, George M. Judgment of Paris: California vs. France and the Historic 1976 Paris Tasting that Revolutionized Wine. New York: Scribner, 2005. ISBN 978-0-7432-4751-1
- Taber, George M. To Cork or Not To Cork: Tradition, Romance, Science, and the Battle for the Wine Bottle. New York: Scribner, 2007. ISBN 978-0-7432-9934-3

== See also ==
- List of wine personalities
