= New Zealand Winegrowers =

National industry body that represents New Zealand's viticulture and winemaking sectors

New Zealand Winegrowers is the national industry body that represents New Zealand's viticulture and winemaking sectors. It conducts research, promotion, marketing and advocacy in the interests of New Zealand grape growers and winemakers, both domestically and in international export markets. Winemakers and grape growers are automatically entitled to membership of New Zealand Winegrowers through payment of the levies on grape or wine sales required by law in the Commodity Levies Act 1991 and the Wine Act 2003. This combined with New Zealand's small size means that it is the only country in the world with a single national wine industry body.

== History ==
In the early 2000s, significant overlaps in mandate and operations were identified in two former national organisations: the Wine Institute of New Zealand, established in 1975, and the New Zealand Grape Growers Council. These organisations were merged in 2002 to become a single organisation, New Zealand Winegrowers, which was finally incorporated in 2016. New Zealand Winegrowers in its 2017 annual report set a target of $2 billion NZD of export revenue by 2020. It believes this can be achieved due to New Zealand's reputation internationally for high quality wines with a higher per-unit price, and the continuing rapid growth of vineyard planting area in New Zealand, from 7,410 hectares (18,300 acres) in 1997 to 37,129 hectares (91,750 acres) in 2017.

== Bragato Research Institute ==
The Bragato Research Institute (BRI) (Māori: Rangahau Karepe Wāina o Aotearoa) is a scientific research and development centre focused on vineyards, wineries and the wine industry supply chain. The BRI is a wholly owned subsidiary of New Zealand Winegrowers and it was launched in 2017 with funding from the Ministry of Business, Innovation and Employment and Marlborough District Council. The BRI is also sponsored by several commercial and research companies. The Research Winery for the BRI opened in February 2020 in Blenheim at the Marlborough Research Centre, and a Grapevine Improvement Laboratory is located at Lincoln University in Canterbury. In 2020, the New Zealand Wine Centre (Māori: Te Pokapū Wāina o Aotearoa) also opened in Blenheim.

The BRI is named after Romeo Bragato, who played a significant role in the establishment of the wine industry in New Zealand.

== See also ==
- New Zealand wine
- Romeo Bragato
