= May Cottrell =

New Zealand writer and spiritualist (1887–1971)

- Born: Violet May Grainger; 17 May 1887; Napier, New Zealand
- Died: 28 May 1971 (aged 84); Napier, New Zealand
- Occupations: Writer and spiritualist
- Spouse: Horace Spence Cottrell (m. 1951; died 1960)
- Children: 2

Violet May Cottrell (née Grainger; 17 May 1887 – 28 May 1971) was a New Zealand writer and spiritualist. She published many articles, poems, radio plays and stories in New Zealand and internationally during her lifetime, as well as one children's novel.

== Early life and family ==
Cottrell was born in Napier, Hawke's Bay, New Zealand on 17 May 1887, one of eight children. Her father was a civil engineer who worked for the Napier Harbour Board. When Cottrell was a small child the family moved to southern Hawke's Bay. The family cleared bush for farming purposes and her father became postmaster of the district. Cottrell left school when she was 13.

She married salesman Horace Spence Cottrell in Napier on 23 February 1951, and they had two children together.

== Career ==
After her marriage, Cottrell began writing poems and articles, at first for her own enjoyment; she eventually published more than 1,000 articles in 13 different countries. She covered diverse subjects such as family life, health and fitness, religion, economics, and war. She supported sex education in schools, which was not a common position at the time. Her husband encouraged her to write and assisted her with marketing her articles for publication. Together with her husband, Cottrell studied the gannet colony at Cape Kidnappers, and toured New Zealand in 1923 presenting lectures on the subject.

In the 1920s and 1930s Cottrell suffered from mental health issues, and believed that she was communicating psychically with the ghost of Arthur Conan Doyle and others. She published articles about her experiences in a spiritualist magazine called The Harbinger of Light. In 1930 local newspaper The Daily Telegraph published an interview with her, describing her as a "spiritualist of already wide repute".

She was a prolific poet and published poems like "Mothers' (So-called) Holidays" and "Sport & Hobby 'Widows'" in women's magazines. In 1930 she published a poem about Pania in British magazine The Blue Peter. It was widely published both locally and internationally, and was reported to be the inspiration behind the Pania of the Reef statute on Marine Parade in Napier. In 1932 she published a song-poem about the 1931 Napier earthquake; The Daily Telegraph praised its "simple and impressive lines" and the "noble and dignified" accompanying music composed by the headmaster of Napier Boys' High School.

The Cottrells moved to Wellington later in the 1930s, where Cottrell worked for the Rehabilitation Board. In 1939 she joined the New Zealand Women Writers' Society, and became an active member, hosting events at her home and participating in the society's competitions. Her son was killed in service in 1942. In the same year, Cottrell's novel for children, The Lost Cave of Pukerangi: a New Zealand story, was published by Frederick Warne & Co. in the United Kingdom.

Cottrell and her husband returned to Napier in 1947, where she continued to write and publish articles, plays, stories and poems about New Zealand life. Her husband died in 1960, and she died in Napier on 28 May 1971, survived by their daughter.
