= Napier Operatic Society =

Amateur theatre society in New Zealand

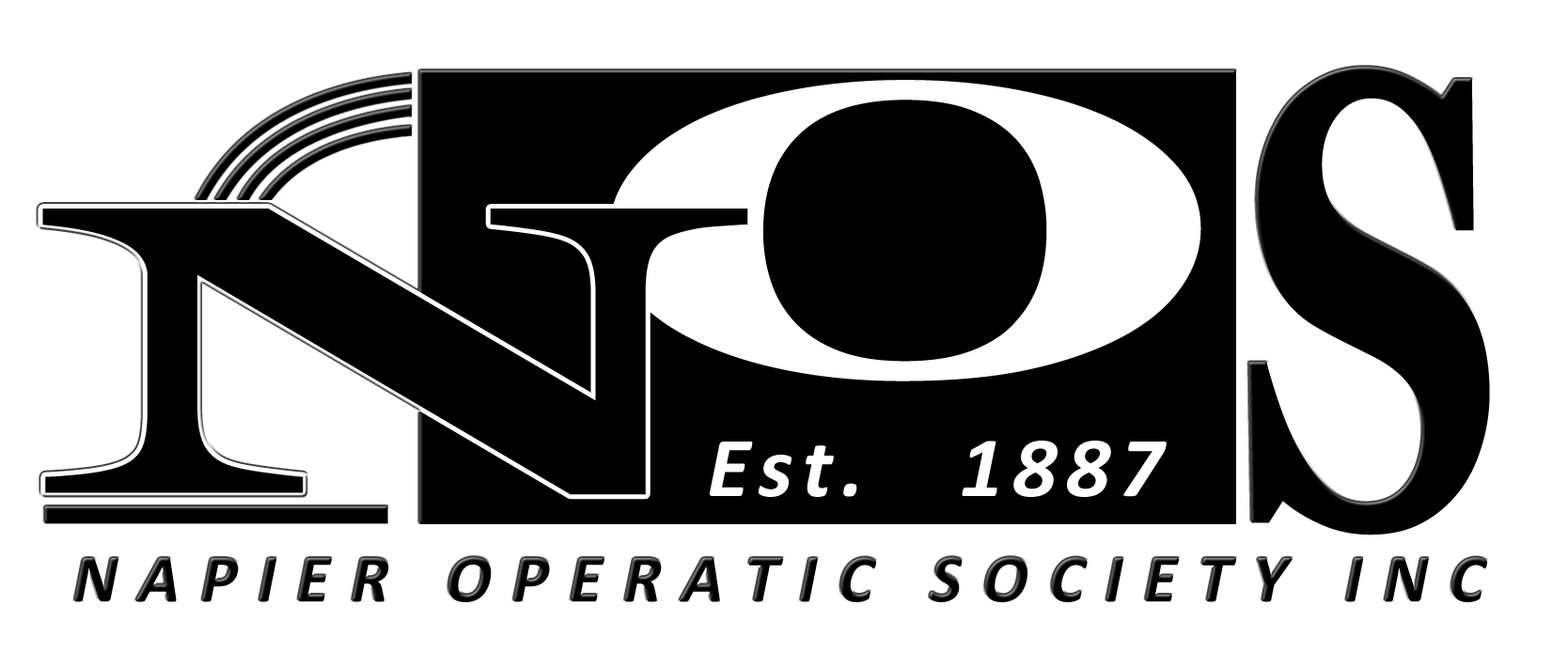

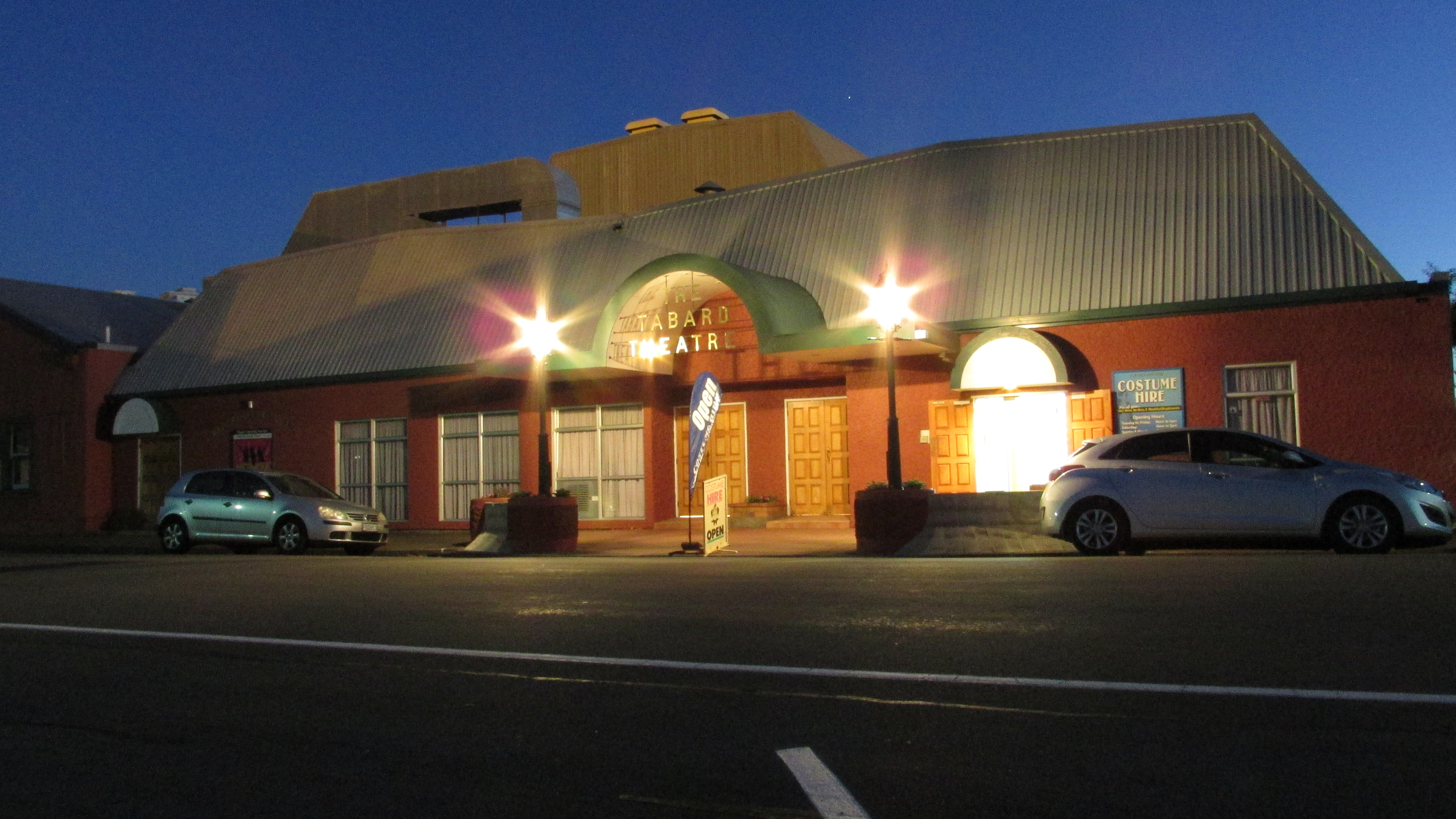
- The Tabard Theatre at night.
- Formation: 1887
- Legal status: Incorporated Society
- Location: Napier, New Zealand
- Region served: Hawkes Bay
- Members: 200~
- Patron: Alan Jones
- President: Donna Briggs
- Website: http://www.napieroperatic.org.nz/

Napier Operatic Society (often abbreviated as NOS) is an amateur theatre society based in Napier, New Zealand, established in 1887 based at The Tabard Theatre.

The Napier Operatic Society produces multiple productions a year, and has done a major stage-show every year since 1887, with the exception of several years throughout the 20th century during overseas conflict and the aftermath of natural disaster.

== History ==
The earliest known theatre company in Napier was the Napier Theatre Co., which in 1883, along with the Napier Musical Society and the Napier Amateur Drama Club combined to create the Theatre Royal. The Theatre Royal made its debut with the musical Trial by Jury, and out of this the Napier Operatic Society was born.

Most of the early productions were Gilbert and Sullivan plays, with the first production at the new Napier Municipal Theatre being A Greek Slave in 1912. The 1800 capacity of the Napier Municipal Theatre was noted to have been "frequently taxed to the uttermost", especially by people who drive in from the country areas. Due to the onset of World War I, The Blue Moon was the last production by Napier Operatic Society until 1921.

Beauty and the Beast, 2007. Photo by Clive Ralph

The 1931 Napier earthquake caused significant damage to the Napier Municipal Theatre, contributing to Napier Operatic's hiatus until 1937. A Special General Meeting was held on 14 October 1937 where it was unanimously decided to revive the society. The first production in over 7 years, Rio Rita, was performed at the newly built Napier Municipal Theatre. Since then, with the exception of during World War II until 1953, there has been at least one production put on by Napier Operatic Society every year. Napier Operatic Society has staged many hit musicals in recent years, including Les Misérables, 42nd Street, Chicago, Cats, Beauty and the Beast, Miss Saigon, The Phantom of the Opera, Mamma Mia!, and Evita. Napier Operatic Society have since begun staging larger productions that typically would be seen at the Napier Municipal Theatre at the Tabard Theatre, such as Evita, Jesus Christ Superstar, and Blood Brothers.

=== Productions: 1887–present ===
1887–1953
1887	The Sorcerer	1888	No production.	1889	The Mikado; Iolanthe	1890	Rip Van Winkle
1891	The Mikado; Iolanthe; Madame Favart	1892	No production.	1893	Rip Van Winkle; Les Cloches de Cornville	1894–1907	No productions.
1908	The Gondoliers	1909	The Mikado	1910	The Geisha	1911	The Runaway Girl
1912	A Greek Slave	1913	Toreador	1914	Miss Hook of Holland	1915	The Blue Moon
1916–1920	No productions.	1921	The Geisha	1922	No production.	1923	A Country Girl
1924	Florodora	1925–1927	No productions.	1928	The Arcadians	1929	The Sunshine Girl
1930	Our Miss Gibbs	1931–1937	No productions.	1938	Rio Rita	1939	The Belle of New York
1940	Boots and All	1941–1953	No productions.				

1954–1999
1954	Chu Chin Chow	1955	The Desert Song				
1956	The New Moon	1957	Oklahoma!	1958	Love from Judy	1959	The Vegabond King
1960	White Horse Inn	1961	Kismet	1962	The Music Man	1963	Where's Charley; The Merry Widow
1964	The Maid of the Mountains	1965	Annie Get Your Gun	1966	Amahal and the Night Visitors	1967	Little Mary Sunshine
1968	The Sound of Music	1969	Camelot	1970	Pink Champagne	1971	South Pacific
1972	Oliver!	1973	Fiddler on the Roof	1974	My Fair Lady	1975	Man of La Mancha
1976	Pirates of Penzance; Music Hall	1977	Oops Titipu; Joseph and the Amazing Technicolour Dreamcoat	1978	Oh, What a Lovely War!	1979	The Great Waltz; Grease
1980	Jesus Christ Superstar	1981	HMS Pinafore; Hans Christian Andersen	1982	Cabaret; Oklahoma!	1983	Annie
1984	Man of La Mancha	1985	The Gingerbread Man; Chicago	1986	Mack and Mabel	1987	The Sorcerer; Nostalgia
1988	Oliver! An Evening with Gershwin	1989	Grease	1990	The Fantastiks; Evita	1991	Tom Jones; Me and My Girl
1992	Jerome Kern, directed by Shirley Jarrett. Joseph and the Amazing Technicolour Dreamcoat, directed by Phil Turley.	1993	Nunsense, directed by Gillian Davies, QSM. West Side Story, directed by Rob Hickey. A Place on Earth, directed by Dick Johnstone.	1994	Canterbury Tales, directed by Dick Johnstone. Cabaret, directed by Gillian Davies, QSM.	1995	Les Misérables, directed by Gillian Davies, QSM; A Slice of Saturday Night, directed by Rob Hickey. Chess, directed by Jane Pierard.
1996	Stepping Out, directed by Tessa-May Brown. Love off the Shelf, directed by John Collier & John Matthews.	1997	42nd Street, directed by Gillian Davies, QSM.	1998	The Pirates of Penzance, directed by Tessa-May Brown. Dirty Weekends, directed by John Collier & John Matthews.	1999	The Mikado, directed by Tessa-May Brown. Jesus Christ Superstar, directed by David Sidwell. Showstoppers, directed by Gillian Davies, QSM.

2000–present
2000	HMS Pinafore, directed by Tessa-May Brown. West End to Broadway, directed by Stephen Robertson.	2001	Sweeny Todd, directed by Gillian Davies, QSM. Return to the Forbidden Planet, directed by John Collier & John Matthews. Moby Dick, directed by Andrea Taafe.	2002	Blood Brothers, directed by Geoff Turkington. Les Misérables, directed by David Sidwell. Some Enchanted Evening, directed by Tessa-May Brown.	2003	Buddy, directed by David Sidwell. Annie, directed by Sylvia Richardson. Little Shop of Horrors, directed by Sonya Aifai.
2004	A Funny Thing Happened on the Way to the Forum, directed by Valda Peacock. The Odd Couple, directed by Sylvia Richardson.	2005	My Fair Lady; Gypsy, directed by Sylvia Richardson. The Full Monty, directed by Chris Davidson.	2006	The Threepenny Opera, directed by William Waitoa. The Boy Friend, directed by Tessa-May Brown. Back to the 80's, directed by Sonya Aifai.	2007	Beauty and the Beast, directed by Gillian Davies, QSM. Cats, directed by Gillian Davies, QSM.
2008	The Producers, directed by Margot Minett & Joanne Stevens. Thoroughly Modern Millie, directed by Tessa-May Brown. Urinetown, directed by Chris Davidson.	2009	Dinner with the Duke; If You're Irish; An ANZAC Tribute; Miss Saigon, directed by Gillian Davies, QSM.	2010	The Wedding Singer, directed by Sonya Aifai. Bad Girls, directed by Wendy Revell.	2011	42nd Street, directed by Rob Hickey. Dusty, directed by Wendy Revell.
2012	Spamalot; Chicago, directed by Wendy Revell. That's Showbiz, directed by Oliver Christopherson.	2013	Hairspray, directed by Wendy Revell. The Phantom of the Opera, directed by Gillian Davies, QSM.	2014	Young Frankenstein, directed by Sylvia Richardson. Dreamgirls, directed by Sonya Aifai. Mamma Mia!, directed by Wendy Revell.	2015	Evita, directed by James McCaffrey. The Addams Family, directed by Rob Hickey. Forbidden Broadway, directed by Dave Richardson.
2016	Jesus Christ Superstar, directed by Anthony Collier & Reiss Jenkinson. Barnum, directed by Mark Oldershaw. Nunsense, directed by Anthony Collier & James McCaffrey.	2017	Mary Poppins, directed by Wendy Revell. Blood Brothers, directed by Anthony Collier. A Great Face for Radio, directed by Wendy Revell.	2018	Oliver!, directed by James McCaffrey. Chess, directed by Sarah Rogers.	2019	Les Misérables, directed by Lisa-Jane Easter. Avenue Q, directed by Rob Hickey.
2020	Grease, directed by William Waitoa.	2021	Sister Act, directed by Wendy Revell.	2022	The Boy Friend, directed by Kerry Unsworth. Into the Woods, directed by Wendy Revell.		

=== Society presidents: 1890–present ===
1890 J. D. Ormand	1893 J. W. Carlile	1910 W. Simm	1924–1929 Dr. R. I. Sutton	1930–1938 J. W. Cargill
1939–1954 J. Harris	1955 K. Douglas	1956 A. E. Herniman	1957–1958 J. S. Henney	1959–1961 E. A. G. Collier
1962–1966 P. Cox	1967 R. A. Clement	1968–1970 W. Tolhurst	1971 H. N. Unsworth	1972–1973 J. Collier
1974 H. Unsworth	1975–1983 W. O. Beckett	1984–1987 Mr. F.T. Twyford	1988–1991 Mr. P. F. Shepherd	1992–1995 Mr. J. A. Briggs
1996–1999 Mr. N.L. Page	2000-2005 Mrs. L.F. Reid	2006–2009 Mrs. L.D. Reid	2010–2012 Mrs. S.R. Pardoe	2012–2016 Mr. M. Collier
2017–2018 Mrs. T. Brown	2019–20 Mrs. A. Oldershaw	2020– Mrs. S.J. Ericksen		

=== Honorary life members ===
Mr. C.W. White*	Mr. P. Sorrell*	Mrs. M. Sorrell*	Mr. E.C. Collier*
Mrs. H. Collier*	Mr. R.B. Wright*	Mrs. W. Quarry*	Mr. R. Houston*
Mr. J. Collier*	Mr. C. Pritchard*	Mrs. D. Unsworth	Mr. A. Jones
Mr. D. Hurley	Mr. F. Twyford	Mr. B. Browne	Mrs. L. Browne
Mrs. R. van de Ven*	Mr. L. Robertson	Mr. C. Allen	Mr. B. Nathan*
Mr. I. Reid	Mr. P. Shepherd	Mr. G. Ace*	Mr. J. Briggs
Miss G. Davies QSM	Mrs. L. Reefman	Mr. P. Eade	Mr. J. Matthews*
Mr. J. Morgan*	Mrs. L. Reid	Mrs. L. Jones	Mrs. A. L. Davies
Mrs. T. M. Brown	Mrs. S. D. Aifai	Mr. N. L. Page*	Mrs. S. J. Page
Mrs. C. R. Kenah			

"*" denotes deceased

== Theatre School ==
The Napier Operatic Society Theatre School (often abbreviated as NOS Theatre School) was one of the first youth theatre programmes to have been established by an existing amateur musical theatre society in New Zealand. Under the direction of Sonya Aifai since 2000, the theatre school has trained aspiring actors by casting them in yearly productions.

The Napier Operatic Society Theatre School has been nationally recognised, including in 2017 when it was awarded the Excellence in Acting award at the Junior Theatre Celebration in Auckland. Subsequently, in both 2018 and 2019, theatre school alumnus Jackson Stone was awarded Outstanding Male Performer two years in a row for his roles as Donkey in Shrek Jr., and as Don Lockwood in Singin' in the Rain Jr.. Stone, alongside of other notable theatre school members Marcus Allan, Maia Driver, and Renee Seymour, represented NOS and New Zealand at the Junior Theatre Festival in Atlanta in 2020.

=== Theatre School productions: 2000–present ===
2000	Establishment of Theatre School.	2001	Little Red Rockin' Hood, directed by Sonya Aifai.	2002	The Halfmen of O, directed by Jenny Wake.	2003	Peter Pan – The Crock Rock Musical, directed by Sonya Aifai.
2004	The Snow Queen, directed by Jenny Wake.	2005	Joseph and the Amazing Technicolour Dreamcoat, directed by Sonya Aifai.	2006	The Wonderful Wizard of Oz, directed by Jenny Wake.	2007	Aladdin Jr., directed by Sonya Aifai.
2008	Mulan Jr., directed by Sonya Aifai.	2009	Puss'n'Kiwiboots, directed by Linstead Allen.	2010	A Midsummer Night's Dream, directed by Jenny Wake.	2011	High School Musical Jr., directed by Sonya Aifai. Cinders in the 60's, directed by Sonya Aifai.
2012	No production.	2013	Bugsy Malone, directed by Samantha Grant-Smith & Edina McFarland.	2014	Joseph and the Amazing Technicolour Dreamcoat, directed by Sonya Aifai.	2015	The Wizard of Oz, directed by Anthony Collier.
2016	Annie Jr., directed by Rachael McKinnon.	2017	Beauty and the Beast Jr., directed by James Wright.	2018	Shrek Jr., directed by Sonya Aifai.	2019	Singin' in the Rain Jr., directed by Rachael McKinnon.
2020	Seussical Jr., directed by Jed Blundell.	2021	The Lion King Jr., directed by Sonya Aifai.	2022	Elf Jr., directed by Marcus Allan.	2023	TBA.
