= Pania =

Figure in Māori mythology

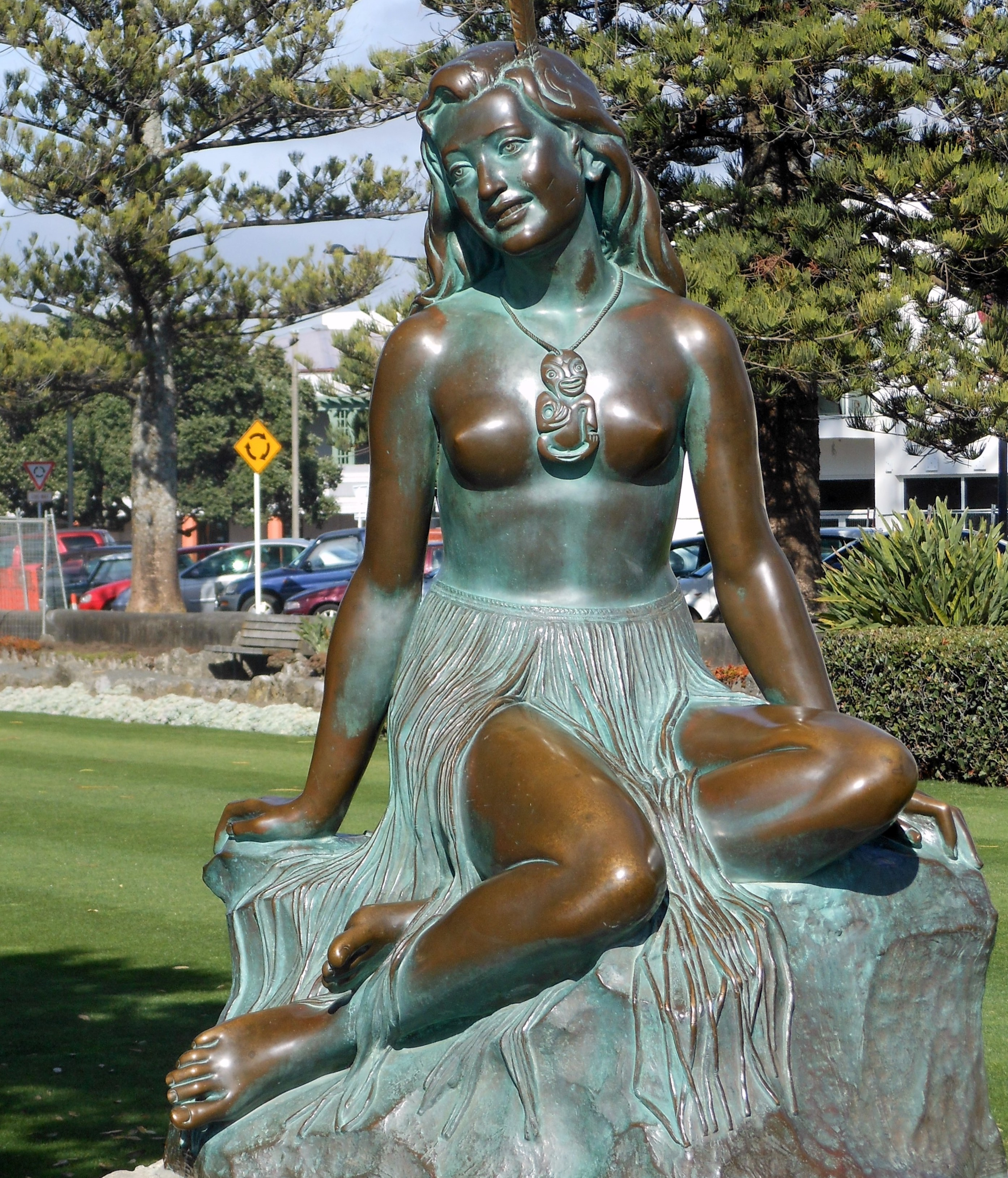
Pania of the Reef statue in Napier

Pania, often styled "Pania of the Reef", is a figure of Māori mythology, and a symbol of the New Zealand city of Napier. There is a statue of Pania on Napier's Marine Parade.

== The legend of Pania of the Reef ==
Pania was a beautiful maiden who lived in the sea on the east coast of the North Island of New Zealand. By daylight she swam about with creatures of her reef world but after sunset would go to a stream that ran into the bay where the city of Napier now exists. She would travel up the stream to an area where she could rest among the flax bushes. Karitoki, the very handsome son of a Māori chief, quenched his thirst every evening at the stream where Pania rested because it had the sweetest water. He was unaware she was observing him for many weeks until one night she whispered a faint spell. It carried on the wind to Karitoki who turned around to see Pania emerge from her hiding place.

Karitoki had never seen someone so beautiful and instantly fell in love. Pania fell in love also, and they pledged their lives to each other and were secretly married. Pania and Karitoki went to his whare (house), but because it was dark no-one saw them enter. At sunrise, Pania prepared to leave but Karitoki tried to stop her. She explained that as a creature of the ocean, when the sirens of the sea called her each morning, she could not survive if she did not go to them. She promised to return every evening and their marriage continued on that basis.

Karitoki boasted to his friends about his beautiful wife, but no one believed him because they had never seen her. Frustrated by this, Karitoki consulted a kaumātua (wise elder) in the village who believed Karitoki as he knew ocean maidens did exist. The kaumātua told Karitoki that being a sea creature, Pania would not be allowed to return to the sea if she swallowed cooked food.

That night, as Pania slept, Karitoki took a morsel of cooked food and put it in Pania's mouth. As he did so, Ruru the morepork owl called a loud warning and Pania was startled from her sleep. Horrified that Karitoki had put her life in jeopardy, Pania fled and ran to the sea. Her people came to the surface and drew her down into the depths as Karitoki swam frantically about the ocean looking for her. He never saw her again.

When people now look deep into the water over the reef, some say they can see Pania with arms outstretched, appealing to her former lover. It is unknown whether she is imploring him to explain his treachery, or expressing her continuing love.

The sea off Napier is now protected by Moremore, the son of Pania and Karitoki. He is the kaitiaki (guardian) of the area, a taniwha (spirit) who often disguises himself as a shark, a stingray or an octopus.
