= Taniwha =

Māori mythological beings

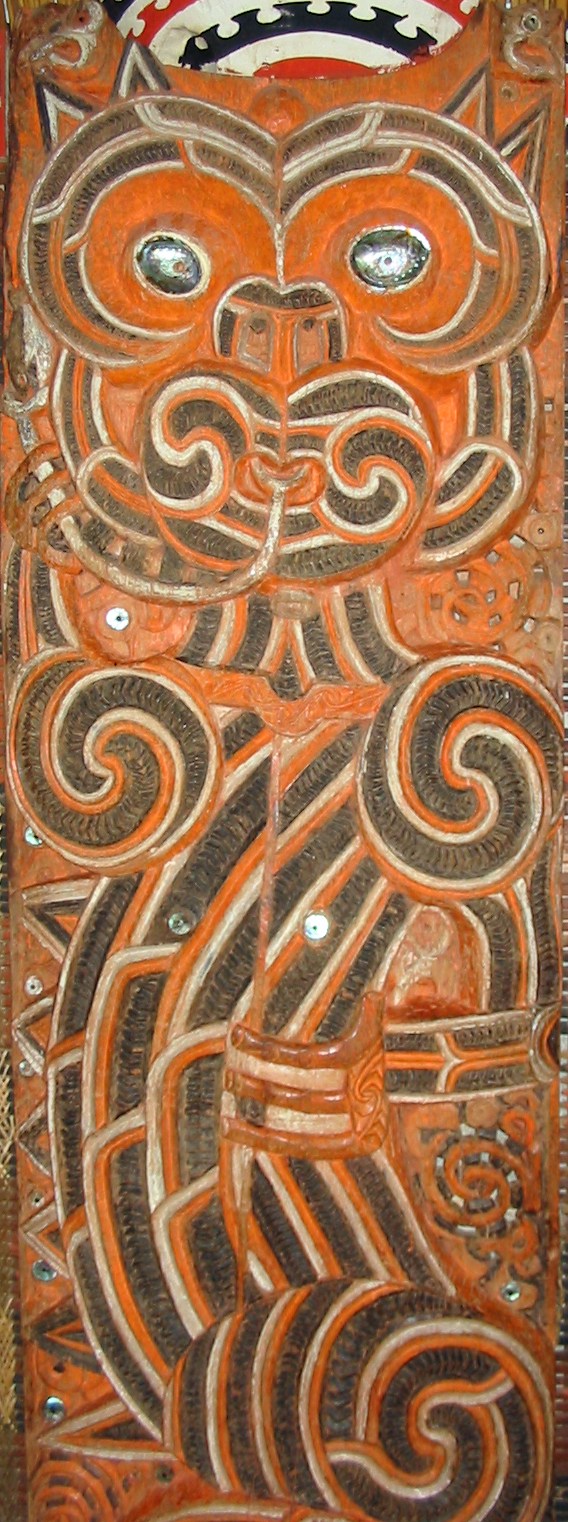
Ureia, guardian taniwha of the Hauraki people. Carving from the meeting house Hotunui, 1878

In Māori mythology, taniwha (Māori pronunciation: [ˈtaniɸa]) are large supernatural beings that live in deep pools in rivers, dark caves, or in the sea, especially in places with dangerous currents or deceptive breakers (giant waves). They may be considered highly respected kaitiaki (protective guardians) of people and places, or in some traditions as dangerous, predatory beings, which for example would kidnap women to have as wives.

== Etymology and Pacific analogues ==
Linguists have reconstructed the word taniwha to Proto-Oceanic *tanifa, with the meaning "shark species". In Tongan and Niuean, tenifa refers to a large dangerous shark, as does the Samoan tanifa; the Tokelauan tanifa is a sea-monster that eats people. In most other Polynesian languages, the cognate words refer to sharks or simply fish.

Some anthropologists have stated that the taniwha has "analogues that appear within other Polynesian cosmologies". Moʻo or Moho, reptilian deities which can be seen in Hawaiian lore, strongly share characteristics with Taniwha as being both protector and harmful to men, shape-shifting, and so on.

== Characteristics ==
At sea, a taniwha often appears as a whale or a large shark such as southern right whale or whale shark; compare the Māori name for the great white shark: mangō-taniwha. In inland waters, they may still be of whale-like dimensions, but look more like a gecko or a tuatara, having a row of spines along the back. Other taniwha appear as a floating log, which behaves in a disconcerting way. Some can tunnel through the earth, uprooting trees in the process. Legends credit certain taniwha with creating harbours by carving out a channel to the ocean. Wellington's harbour, Te Whanganui-a-Tara, was reputedly carved out by two taniwha. The petrified remains of one of them turned into a hill overlooking the city. Lake Waikaremoana in Te Urewera Ranges area of Wairoa District was also reputedly carved out by taniwha. Other taniwha allegedly caused landslides beside lakes or rivers.

Taniwha can either be male or female. The taniwha Āraiteuru is said to have arrived in New Zealand with the early voyaging canoes and her eleven sons are credited with creating the various branches of the Hokianga Harbour.

== As guardians ==
Most taniwha have associations with tribal groups; each group may have a taniwha of its own. The taniwha Ureia, depicted on this page, was associated as a guardian with the Māori people of the Hauraki district. Many well-known taniwha arrived from Hawaiki, often as guardians of a particular ancestral canoe. Once arrived in Aotearoa, they took on a protective role over the descendants of the crew of the canoe they had accompanied. The origins of many other taniwha are unknown.

When accorded appropriate respect, taniwha usually acted well towards their people. Taniwha acted as guardians by warning of the approach of enemies, communicating the information via a priest who was a medium; sometimes the taniwha saved people from drowning. Because they lived in dangerous or dark and gloomy places, the people were careful to placate the taniwha with appropriate offerings if they needed to be in the vicinity or to pass by its lair. These offerings were often of a green twig, accompanied by a fitting incantation. In harvest time, the first kūmara (sweet potato) or the first taro was often presented to the taniwha.

Arising from the role of taniwha as tribal guardians, the word can also refer in a complimentary way to chiefs. The famous saying of the Tainui people of the Waikato district plays on this double meaning: Waikato taniwha rau (Waikato of a hundred chiefs).

Witi Ihimaera, author of The Whale Rider, says that he has a female kaitiaki (guardian) taniwha named Hine Te Ariki who lives in the Waipaoa River.

== As notorious monsters ==
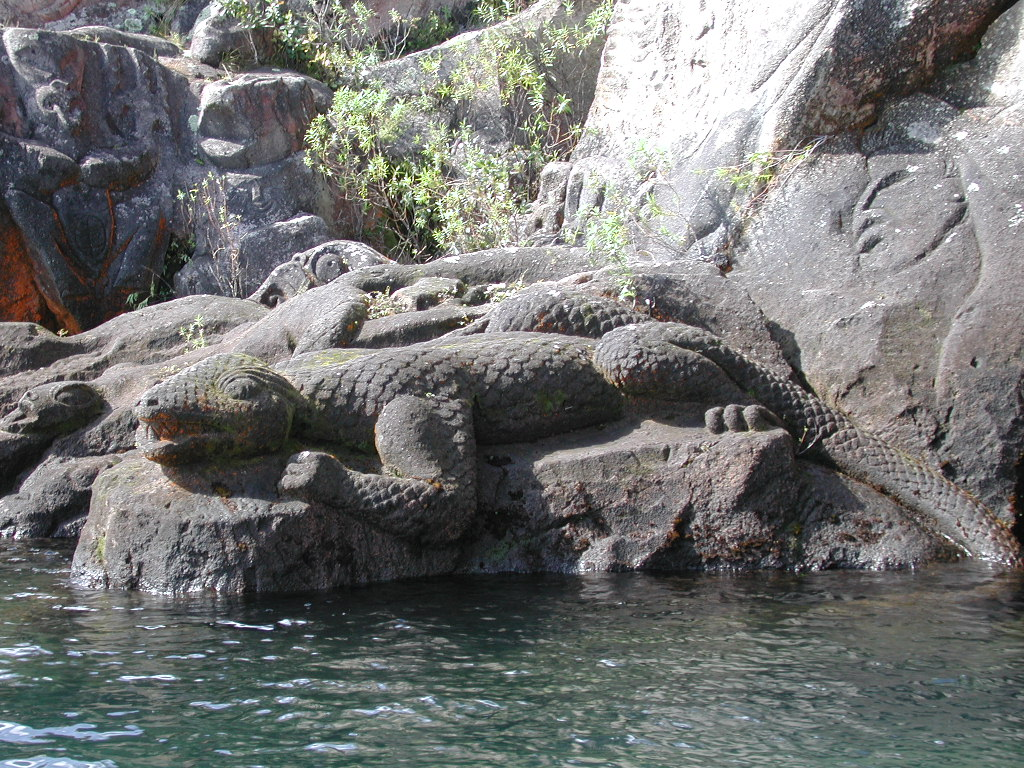
A rock carving of taniwha near Lake Taupō

In their role as guardians, taniwha were vigilant to ensure that the people respected the restrictions imposed by tapu. They made certain that any violations of tapu were punished. Taniwha were especially dangerous to people from other tribes. There are many legends of battles with taniwha, both on land and at sea. Often these conflicts took place soon after the settlement of New Zealand, generally after a taniwha had attacked and eaten a person from a tribe that it had no connection with. Always, the humans manage to outwit and defeat the taniwha. Many of these taniwha are described as beings of lizard-like form, and some of the stories say the huge beasts were cut up and eaten by the slayers. When Hotu-puku, a taniwha of the Rotorua district, was killed, his stomach was cut open to reveal a number of bodies of men, women, and children, whole and still undigested, as well as various body parts. The taniwha had swallowed all that his victims had been carrying, and his stomach also contained weapons of various kinds, darts, greenstone ornaments, shark's teeth, flax clothing, and an assortment of fur and feather cloaks of the highest quality.

Many taniwha were killers but in this particular instance the taniwha Kaiwhare was eventually tamed by Tāmure. Tāmure lived at Hauraki and was understood to have a magical mere/pounamu with powers to defeat taniwha. The Manukau people then called for Tāmure to help kill the taniwha. Tāmure and Kaiwhare wrestled and Tāmure clubbed the taniwha over the head. Although he was unable to kill it, his actions tamed the taniwha. Kaiwhare still lives in the waters but now lives on kōura (crayfish) and wheke (octopus).

Ngārara Huarau is a taniwha known from the myths of several groups of Māori in the northern South Island. In most versions of the story, the monster eats several villagers and captures a young woman whom he keeps in a cave by the sea. Ngārara Huarau is eventually enticed to come to the local village for a feast, where he is ambushed and killed by the villagers. In each version of the story, upon his death the monster's tail detaches itself and is thrown far away into a body of water. In the version of Wainui Bay, and the Tākaka Māori, the tail lands in the pool at the base of Wainui Falls.

== Relationships with people ==
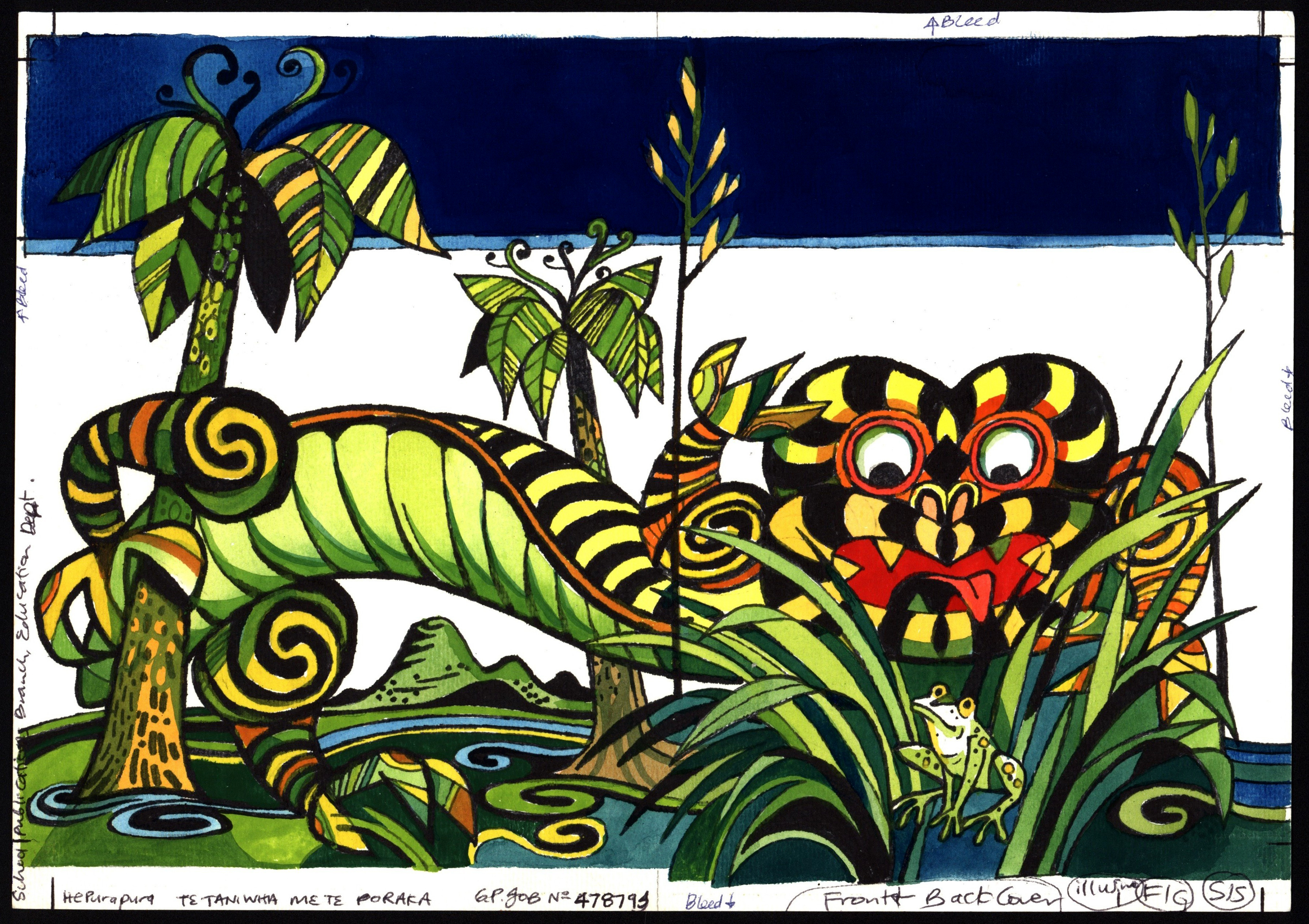
A drawing by Murray Grimsdale

Sometimes, a person who had dealings with taniwha during their lifetime might turn into a taniwha after they died. This happened to Te Tahi-o-te-rangi, who had been a medium for the taniwha, and had been rescued at one time by one of the creatures. Tūheita, an early ancestor who drowned, became a taniwha despite the fact that he had no prior dealings with the mythical beasts. Sometimes relationships are formed between humans and taniwha. Hine-kōrako was a female taniwha who married a human man, and Pania was a woman from the sea who married a human and gave birth to a taniwha.

In the legend "The Taniwha of Kaipara" three sisters went out to pick berries. One of the sisters was particularly beautiful. The taniwha caused havoc on their walk back and the sisters fled. The taniwha caught the sisters one by one, trying to capture the beautiful one. On succeeding, he then took her back to his cave. Many years passed and the woman bore the taniwha six sons, with three like their father and three fully human. She educated all her sons and in particular taught her human sons the art of war, helping them to fashion and use weapons. The human sons then killed their three taniwha brothers, and eventually their father. They all went back to their homes.

== Modern usage ==
"In more recent years, taniwha have featured prominently in New Zealand news broadcasts—due to taniwha spirits being referenced in both court cases and in various legal negotiations." Beliefs in the existence of taniwha have a potential for controversy but there has been a change in the way they are viewed; rather than being derided for holding up development and infrastructure projects they are becoming recognised as indicators of natural hazards.

In 2002, Ngāti Naho, a Māori iwi (tribe) from the Meremere district, successfully ensured that part of the country's major highway, State Highway 1, be rerouted in order to protect the abode of their legendary protector. This taniwha was said to have the appearance of large white eel, and Ngāti Naho argued that it must not be removed but rather move on of its own accord; to remove the taniwha would be to invite trouble. Television New Zealand reported in November 2002 that Transit New Zealand had negotiated a deal with Ngāti Naho under which "concessions have been put in place to ensure that the taniwha are respected". Some like the journalist Brian Rudman have criticised such deals in respect of 'secretive taniwha which rise up from swamps and river beds every now and again, demanding a tithe from Transit New Zealand'.

In 2001 "another notable instance of taniwha featuring heavily within the public eye was that of a proposed Northland prison site at Ngawha which was eventually granted approval through the courts."

Māori academic Ranginui Walker said that in the modern age a taniwha was the manifestation of a coping mechanism for some Māori. It did not mean there actually was a creature lurking in the water, it was just their way of indicating they were troubled by some incident or event.

In 2021, the 28th Minister of Foreign Affairs of New Zealand Nanaia Mahuta characterised China–New Zealand relations as the relationship between a taniwha and a dragon.

== See also ==
- Te Wheke-a-Muturangi
- Pania
