= Thomas Allan Napier Corson =

New Zealand businessman and politician

- Born: 25 February 1902; Napier, Hawke's Bay, New Zealand
- Died: 30 April 1972 (aged 70)
- Occupations: Businessman, local politician
- Known for: Business and civic service in Napier, New Zealand

Thomas Allan Napier Corson (25 February 1902 – 30 April 1972) was a New Zealand businessman and local politician. He was born in Napier, Hawke's Bay, New Zealand on 25 February 1902.
