= Napier, New Zealand =

Napier Ahuriri (Māori)
- City
- Napier CBD T & G building and Masonic Hotel Pania of the Reef Taradale clock tower Art Deco festivities Sound Shell

- Flag Coat of arms
- Motto: Faith and Courage
- Location of Napier
- Coordinates: 39°29′25″S 176°55′04″E
- Country: New Zealand
- Region: Hawke's Bay
- Established: 1851

Government
  - Territorial authority: Napier City Council
  - Mayor: Richard McGrath
  - Deputy mayor: Graeme Taylor

Area
  - Territorial: 105.05 km^{2} (40.56 sq mi)
  - Urban: 105.05 km^{2} (40.56 sq mi)

Population (June 2025)
  - Territorial: 66,400
  - Density: 632/km^{2} (1,640/sq mi)
  - Urban: 66,400
  - Urban density: 632/km^{2} (1,640/sq mi)
  - Demonym: Napierite
- Time zone: UTC+12 (NZST)
  - Summer (DST): UTC+13 (NZDT)
- Area code: 06
- Website: www.napier.govt.nz

Napier (/ˈneɪpi.ər/ NAY-pee-ər; Māori: Ahuriri) is a city in the Hawke's Bay region on the eastern coast of the North Island of New Zealand. It is a beachside city with a seaport, known for its sunny climate, esplanade lined with Norfolk pines, and extensive Art Deco architecture. For these attributes, Napier is sometimes romantically referred to as the "Nice of the Pacific".

Napier is in the territory of Ngāti Kahungunu, one of the country's largest Māori iwi, and as a city has been shaped by nearly two centuries of migration. Its population is about 66,400 as of June 2025. About 18 km (11 mi) south of Napier is the city of Hastings. These two neighbouring cities are often called "The Bay Cities" or "The Twin Cities" of New Zealand, with the two cities and the surrounding towns of Havelock North and Clive having a combined population of 133,240. The City of Napier has a land area of 106 km^{2} (41 sq mi) and a population density of 540.0 per square kilometre.

Napier is the nexus of the largest wool centre in the Southern Hemisphere, and Napier Port is the primary export seaport for northeastern New Zealand – which is the largest producer of apples, pears, and stone fruit in the country. The fruit grown around Hastings and Napier is exported through the port, along with large amounts of sheep wool, frozen meat, wood pulp, and timber. Smaller amounts of these products are shipped by road and railway to the large metropolitan areas of New Zealand, such as Auckland, Wellington and Hamilton. The Hawke's Bay wine region is the second largest in New Zealand, after Marlborough.

Tourists are drawn by Napier's unique concentration of 1930s Art Deco, and to a lesser extent Spanish Mission, architecture, built after much of the city was razed in the 1931 Hawke's Bay earthquake. It also has one of the most photographed tourist attractions in the country, a statue of the figure in local Ngāti Kahungunu mythology, Pania, on Marine Parade (Pania of the Reef). Thousands of people flock to Napier every February for the Art Deco Festival, a celebration of its Art Deco heritage and history. Other notable tourist events attracting many outsiders to the region annually include F.A.W.C! Food and Wine Classic events, and the Mission Estate Concert at Mission Estate Winery in the suburb of Taradale.

== History ==
=== Māori history ===
Napier has well-documented Māori history. When the Ngāti Kahungunu party of Taraia reached the district many centuries ago, the Whatumamoa, Rangitāne, Ngāti Awa and elements of the Ngāti Tara iwi lived in the nearby areas of Petane, Te Whanganui-a-Orotu and Waiohiki. Ngāti Kahungunu later became the dominant force from Poverty Bay to Wellington. Chief Te Ahuriri cut a channel from the lagoon to the sea at Ahuriri because the Westshore entrance had become blocked, threatening cultivations surrounding the lagoon and the fishing villages on the islands in the lagoon. The rivers were continually feeding freshwater into the area. Ngāti Kahungunu were one of the first Māori tribes that European settlers had contact with.

=== European settlers history ===
Captain James Cook and his crew were the first Europeans to see the future site of Napier when they sailed down the east coast in October 1769. He commented: "On each side of this bluff head is a low, narrow sand or stone beach, between these beaches and the mainland is a pretty large lake of salt water I suppose." He said the harbour entrance was at the Westshore end of the shingle beach.

After 1830, the site was visited and later settled by European traders, whalers and missionaries. By the 1850s, farmers and hotel-keepers arrived.

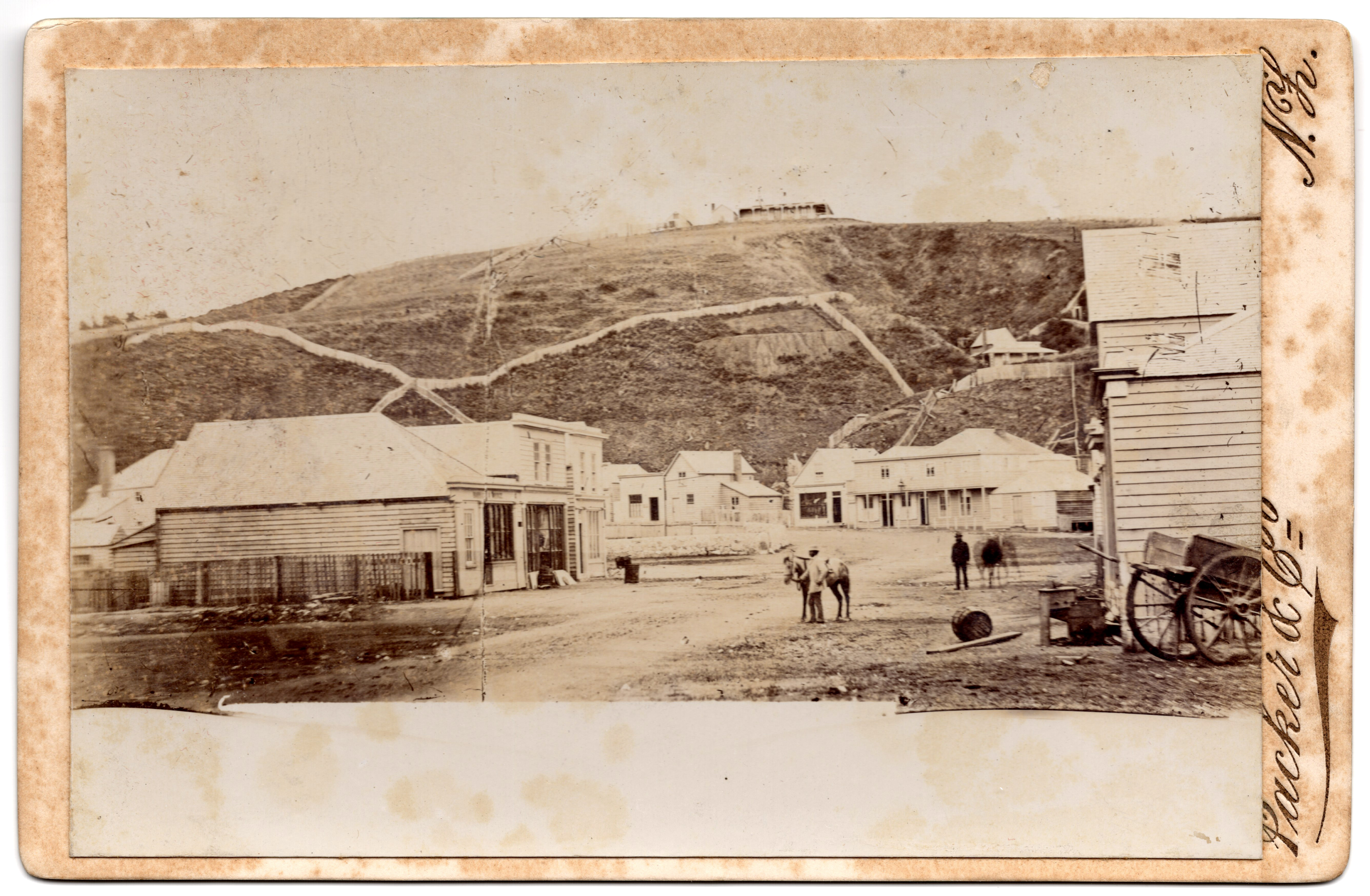
Hastings Street, 1862

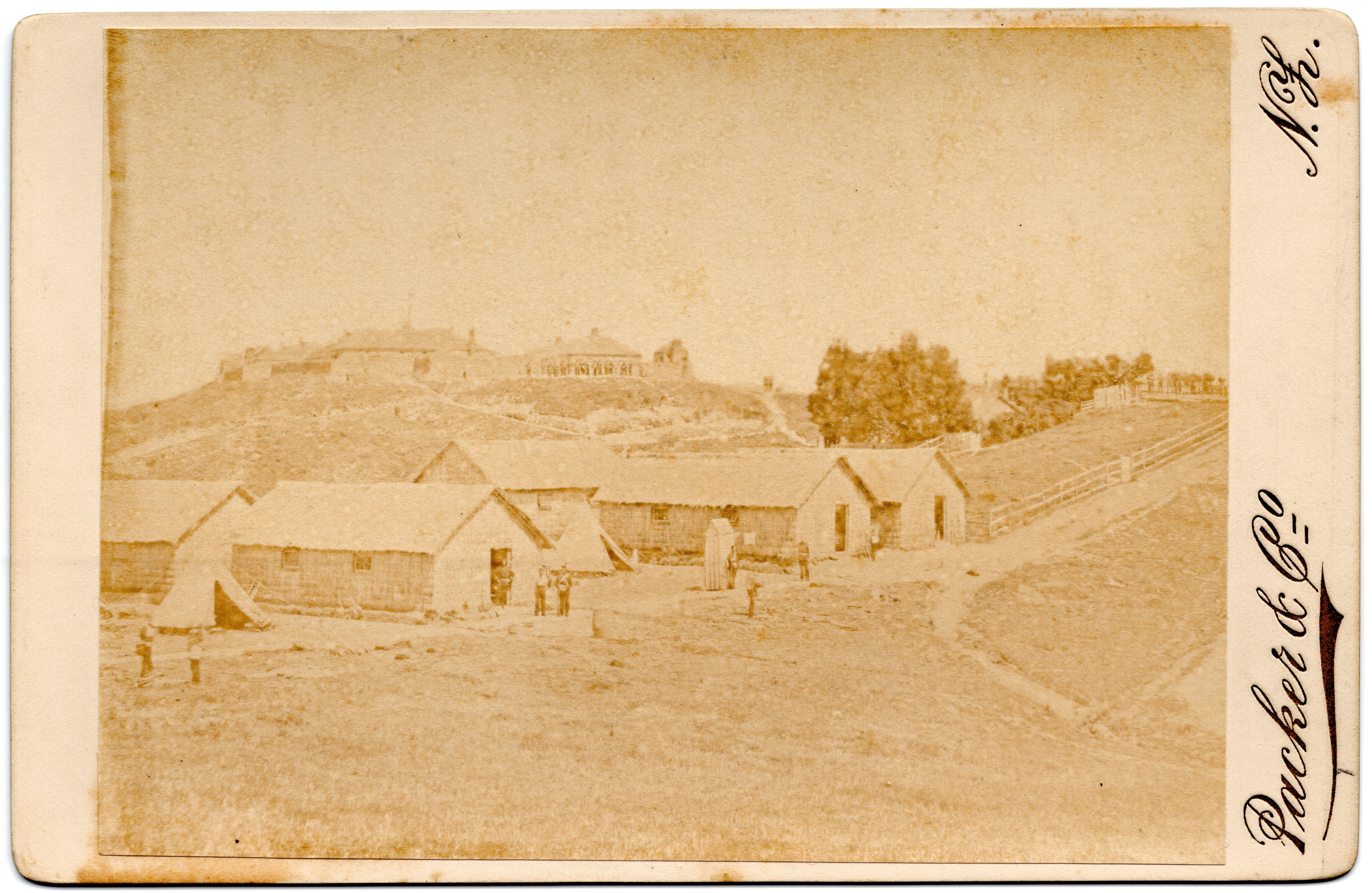
Napier Barracks, c. 1864

The Crown purchased the Ahuriri block (including the site of Napier) in 1851. In 1854 Alfred Domett, a future Prime Minister of New Zealand, was appointed as the Commissioner of Crown Lands and the resident magistrate at the village of Ahuriri. It was decided to place a planned town here, its streets and avenues were laid out, and the new town named for Sir Charles Napier, a military leader during the Battle of Miani in Sindh. Domett named many streets in Napier to commemorate the colonial era of the British Indian Empire.

Development was generally confined to the hills and to the port area of Ahuriri. In the early years, Napier covered almost exclusively an oblong group of hills (the Scinde Island) which was nearly entirely surrounded by the ocean, but from which ran out two shingle spits, one to the north and one to the south. There was a swamp between the now Hastings Street and Wellesley Road, and the sea extended to Clive Square.

Napier was designated as a borough in 1874, but the development of the surrounding marshlands and reclamation proceeded slowly. Napier was the administrative centre for the Hawke's Bay Province from 1858 until the abolition of New Zealand's provincial governments in 1876.

=== 20th century ===
On 3 February 1931, most of Napier and nearby Hastings was levelled by an earthquake. The collapse of buildings and the ensuing fires killed 256 people. Some 4000 hectares of today's Napier were undersea before the earthquake raised it above sea level. The earthquake uplifted an area of 1500 km^{2} with a maximum of 2.7 m of uplift. In Hastings, about 1 m of ground subsidence occurred.

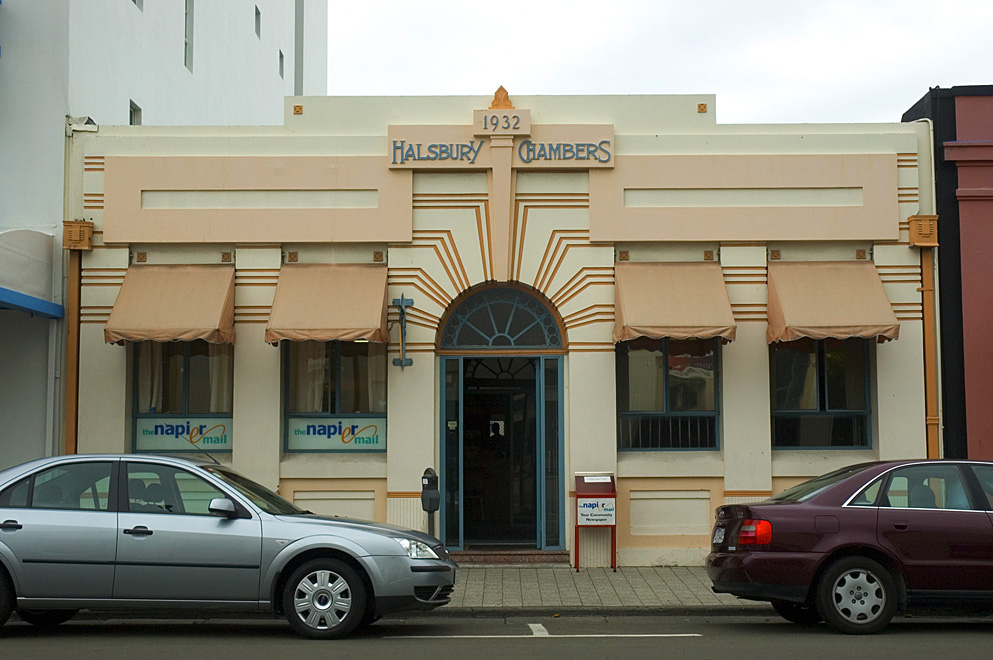
Halsbury Chambers (architect Louis Hay, 1932)

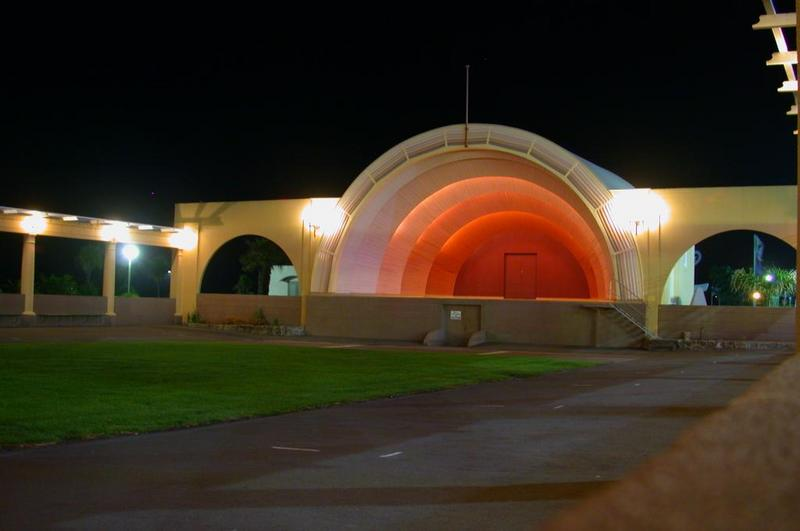
Sound Shell (built 1935) at night

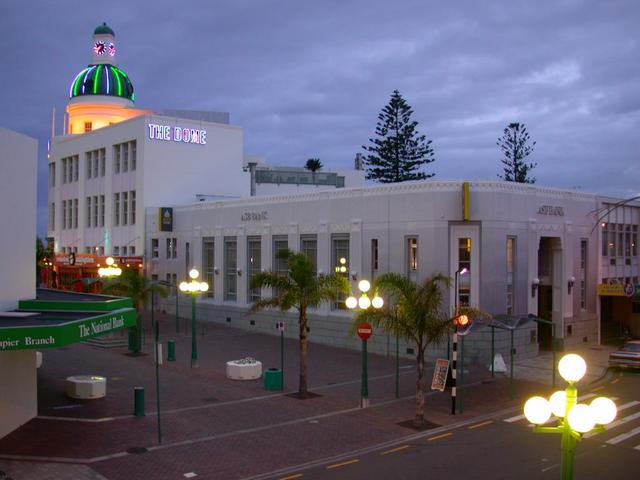
Lit-up dome of the T & G building (built 1936) at dusk

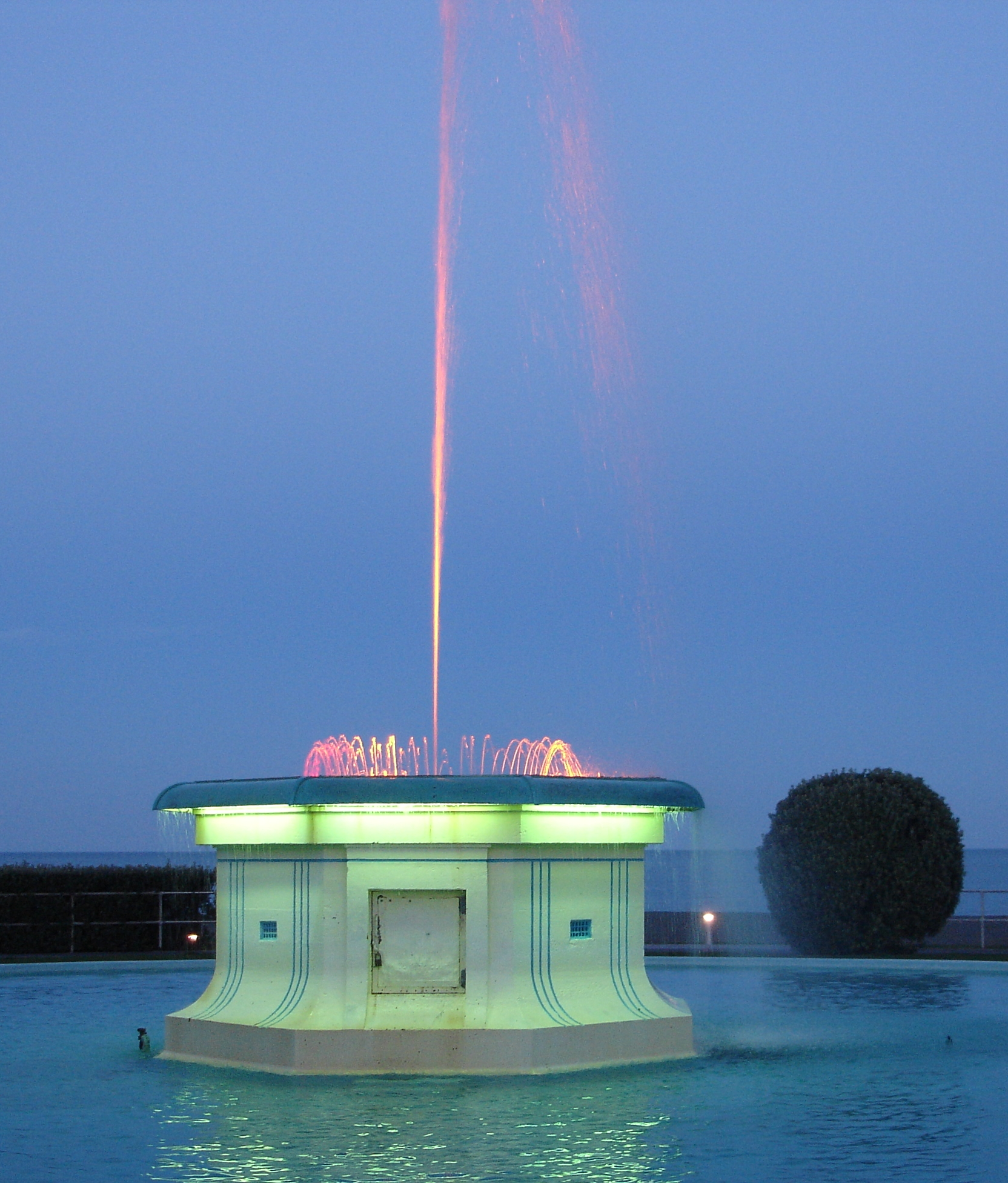
Tom Parker Fountain (built 1936) at dusk

The centre of Napier, destroyed by the earthquake, was rebuilt in the Art Deco style popular in the 1930s. Although a few Art Deco buildings were replaced with contemporary structures in the 1960s to 1980s, most of the centre remained intact for long enough to become recognised as architecturally important, and it has been protected and restored since the 1990s. Napier and the area of South Beach, Miami, Florida, are considered to be the two best-preserved Art Deco towns (with the town of Miami Beach, Florida, being mostly decorated in the somewhat later Streamline Moderne style of Art Deco). Beginning in 2007, Napier was nominated as a World Heritage Site with UNESCO. This is the first cultural site in New Zealand to be so nominated. It was denied World Heritage status in 2011 as it did not meet the appropriate criteria. Still, the report of the application acknowledged the Art Deco heritage as "first and foremost of outstanding value to all New Zealanders".

In January 1945, the German submarine U-862 entered and departed from the port of Napier undetected. This event became the basis of a widely circulated postwar tall tale that the captain of this U-boat, Heinrich Timm, had led crewmen ashore near Napier to milk cows to supplement their meagre rations.

=== Modern history ===
Napier was the scene of an armed attack by cannabis dealer Jan Molenaar on three police officers searching his home in May 2009. He killed one officer, and wounded two others and a civilian. He continued to fire shots from his house, which police besieged, until he committed suicide 40 hours later.

On 9 November 2020, a local state of emergency was declared in Napier after the region received 237 mm of rainfall across 24 hours – the most daily rainfall in the city since 1963 and the second most since records began. The event caused widespread flooding, slips, power cuts and evacuations.

On 14 February 2023, floods caused by Cyclone Gabrielle destroyed bridges over the Tūtaekurī River, and damaged a major regional electrical substation at Redclyffe, which cut power to much of northern Hawke's Bay including its telecommunication infrastructure. Flooding also caused extensive property damage to Esk Valley, Taradale and Meeanee, as well as loss of crops, livestock and several human lives.

== Geography ==
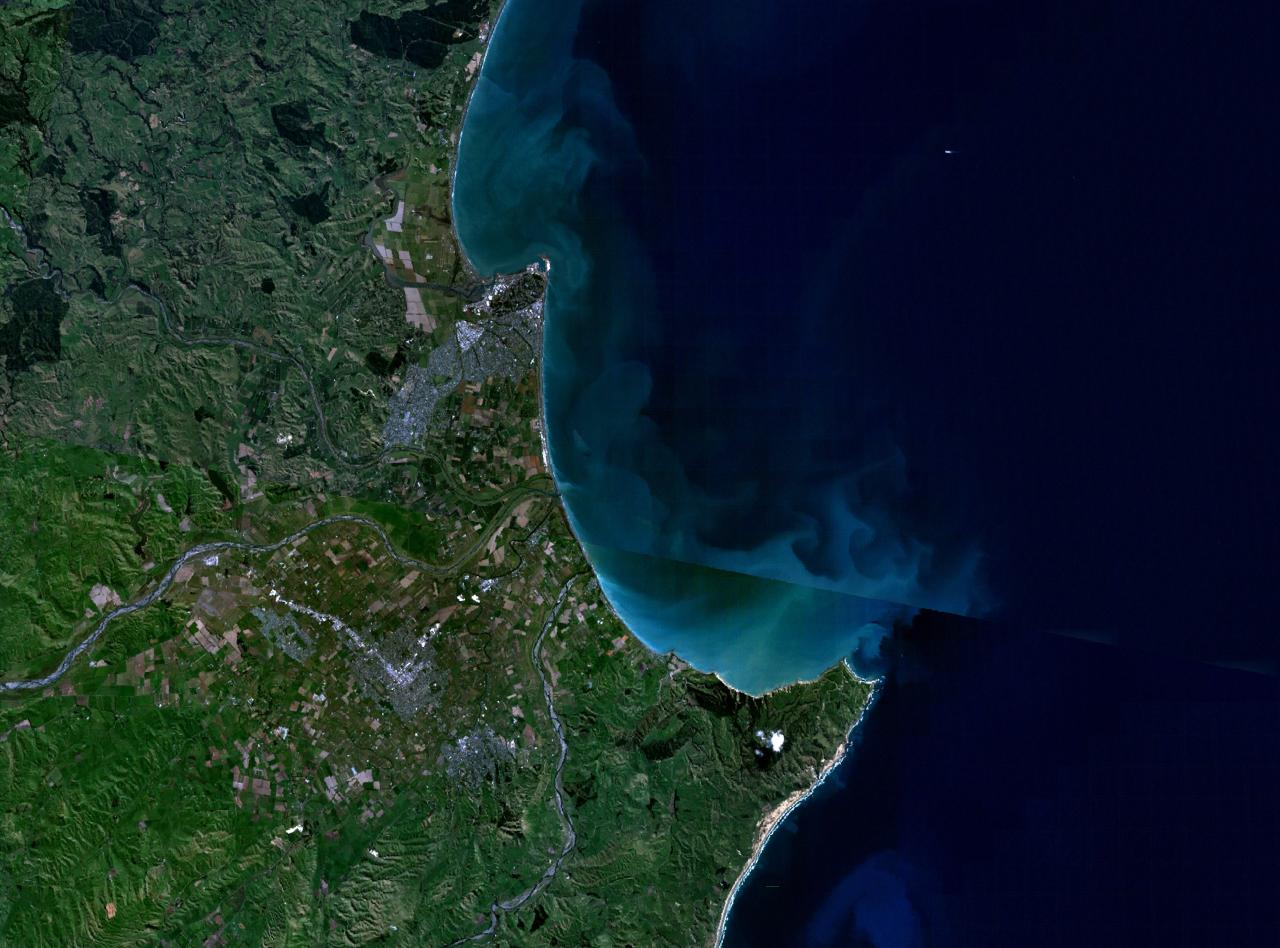
NASA satellite photo of Napier and southern Hawke Bay

The city is on Napier Hill and the surrounding Heretaunga Plains at the southeastern edge of Hawke Bay, a large semi-circular bay that dominates the east coast of the North Island. The coastline of the city was substantially altered by the earthquake in 1931. About two thirds of Napier's land area is rural.

The topography puts Napier in danger from a tsunami, as the centre of the commercial city is near sea level – should the sea ever crest Marine Parade, the sea would run through to Ahuriri. Furthermore, by virtue of its pre-1931 existence, the bulk of Napier is susceptible to soil liquefaction, the risk classed as Very High for the main urban area excluding the hill.

=== Suburbs ===
Map of the suburbs of Napier (as defined by LINZ). Note that some suburbs contain land outside the Napier City territorial authority area

The suburbs of Napier as defined by LINZ from north to south are:

Suburb	Pop.	Area	General ward (Note: General ward the suburb is mainly located in. Minor areas may be in other general wards. All suburbs are in the one city-wide Māori ward)
Bay View	2,149	17.30 km^{2}	Ahuriri
Westshore	1,352	9.78 km^{2}	Ahuriri
Napier Airport	0	2.05 km^{2}	Ahuriri
Napier Port	0	0.58 km^{2}	Ahuriri
Poraiti	2,438	17.73 km^{2}	Ahuriri
Ahuriri	1,295	1.01 km^{2}	Ahuriri
Bluff Hill	2,708	1.42 km^{2}	Ahuriri
Hospital Hill	2,662	1.31 km^{2}	Ahuriri
Pandora	170	1.23 km^{2}	Ahuriri
Napier South	5,270	2.53 km^{2}	Ahuriri
Marewa	5,527	2.27 km^{2}	Napier Central
Onekawa	7,004	3.70 km^{2}	Napier Central
Tamatea	5,764	2.15 km^{2}	Napier Central
Pirimai	4,061	1.42 km^{2}	Napier Central
Maraenui	4,001	1.05 km^{2}	Napier Central
Te Awa	969	1.03 km^{2}	Ahuriri
Greenmeadows	5,883	3.08 km^{2}	Taradale
Meeanee	1,130	17.36 km^{2}	Taradale and Ahuriri
Taradale	12,787	11.36 km^{2}	Taradale
Awatoto	1,611	5.90 km^{2}	Ahuriri
Jervoistown	672	1.38 km^{2}	Taradale

The city's central business district (CBD), also known as Central Napier, is defined as part of Napier South by LINZ but is often considered separate. Bluff Hill and Hospital Hill are also often lumped together as the larger suburb of Napier Hill.

=== Climate ===
Under the Köppen climate classification, Napier has an oceanic climate (Cfb). The climate is warm and relatively dry, due to its location on the east coast. Most of New Zealand's weather patterns cross the country from the west, and the city lies in the rain shadow of the North Island Volcanic Plateau and surrounding ranges such as the Kaweka Range.

Climate data for Napier (1991–2020 normals, extremes 1868–present)
Month	Jan	Feb	Mar	Apr	May	Jun	Jul	Aug	Sep	Oct	Nov	Dec	Year
Record high °C (°F)	37.2 (99.0)	37.4 (99.3)	33.1 (91.6)	29.2 (84.6)	27.5 (81.5)	25.1 (77.2)	23.1 (73.6)	23.4 (74.1)	26.7 (80.1)	31.3 (88.3)	33.4 (92.1)	34.4 (93.9)	37.4 (99.3)
Mean maximum °C (°F)	31.8 (89.2)	31.0 (87.8)	28.7 (83.7)	25.6 (78.1)	22.7 (72.9)	20.1 (68.2)	19.3 (66.7)	20.2 (68.4)	23.0 (73.4)	25.3 (77.5)	27.3 (81.1)	29.4 (84.9)	32.5 (90.5)
Mean daily maximum °C (°F)	24.7 (76.5)	24.4 (75.9)	22.8 (73.0)	20.2 (68.4)	17.8 (64.0)	15.2 (59.4)	14.5 (58.1)	15.4 (59.7)	17.5 (63.5)	19.5 (67.1)	21.0 (69.8)	23.3 (73.9)	19.7 (67.5)
Daily mean °C (°F)	19.7 (67.5)	19.6 (67.3)	17.7 (63.9)	15.1 (59.2)	12.6 (54.7)	10.2 (50.4)	9.6 (49.3)	10.4 (50.7)	12.4 (54.3)	14.5 (58.1)	16.1 (61.0)	18.4 (65.1)	14.7 (58.5)
Mean daily minimum °C (°F)	14.7 (58.5)	14.7 (58.5)	12.6 (54.7)	10.0 (50.0)	7.5 (45.5)	5.2 (41.4)	4.8 (40.6)	5.4 (41.7)	7.4 (45.3)	9.4 (48.9)	11.1 (52.0)	13.6 (56.5)	9.7 (49.5)
Mean minimum °C (°F)	8.1 (46.6)	8.8 (47.8)	6.5 (43.7)	3.6 (38.5)	0.5 (32.9)	−0.9 (30.4)	−1.2 (29.8)	−0.8 (30.6)	0.6 (33.1)	2.8 (37.0)	4.4 (39.9)	6.9 (44.4)	−2.0 (28.4)
Record low °C (°F)	4.2 (39.6)	3.3 (37.9)	0.0 (32.0)	−0.5 (31.1)	−2.6 (27.3)	−4.0 (24.8)	−5.3 (22.5)	−6.5 (20.3)	−2.2 (28.0)	−1.7 (28.9)	−0.3 (31.5)	1.7 (35.1)	−6.5 (20.3)
Average rainfall mm (inches)	63.8 (2.51)	54.1 (2.13)	61.8 (2.43)	81.2 (3.20)	62.2 (2.45)	78.5 (3.09)	97.0 (3.82)	57.0 (2.24)	58.1 (2.29)	60.9 (2.40)	57.3 (2.26)	57.8 (2.28)	789.7 (31.1)
Average rainy days (≥ 1.0 mm)	6.2	6.2	7.4	7.8	6.9	7.9	8.8	7.9	7.5	7.4	6.5	6.9	87.4
Average relative humidity (%)	66.3	72.4	75.6	76.4	78.1	79.4	80.6	76.1	69.5	67.7	63.7	65.2	72.6
Mean monthly sunshine hours	258.7	207.0	207.0	169.7	161.8	138.0	144.1	173.4	188.7	221.6	228.5	235.4	2,333.9
Mean daily daylight hours	14.6	13.6	12.3	11.0	10.0	9.4	9.7	10.6	11.8	13.1	14.3	14.9	12.1
Percentage possible sunshine	57	54	54	51	52	49	48	53	53	55	53	51	53
Source 1: NIWA Climate Data
Source 2: Weather Spark

== Demographics ==
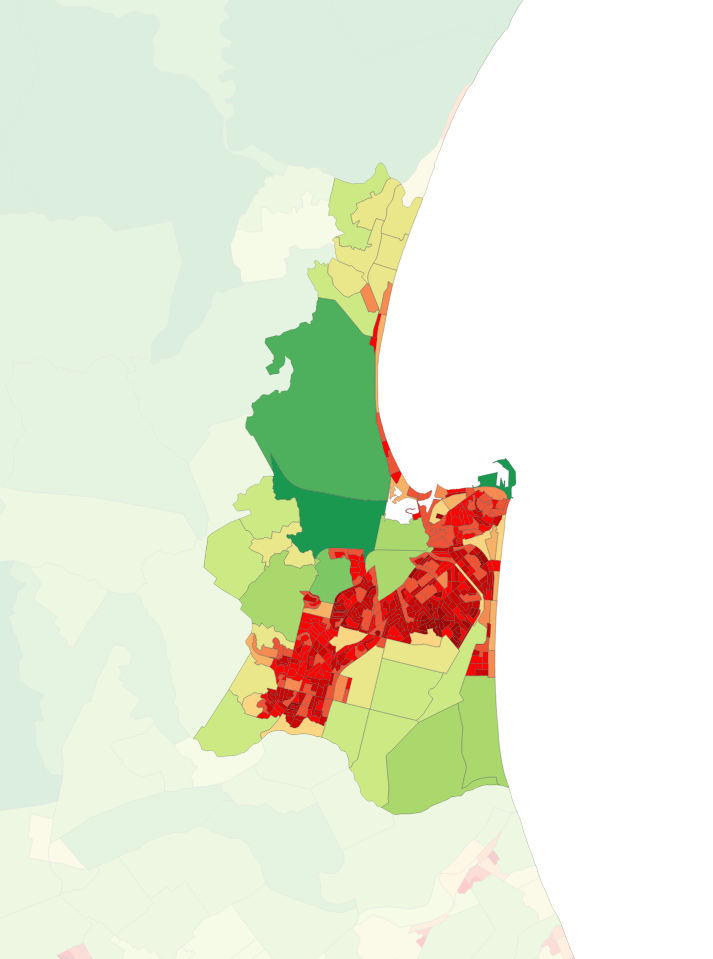
Population density in the 2023 census

The Napier urban area, as defined by Statistics New Zealand, is coterminous with the Napier City territorial authority and covers 105.05 km^{2} (40.56 sq mi). It had an estimated population of 66,400 as of June 2025, with a population density of 632 people per km^{2}.

Historical population
Year	Pop.	±% p.a.
1986	52,512	—
1991	51,645	−0.33%
1996	54,900	+1.23%
2001	55,200	+0.11%
2006	56,359	+0.42%
2013	57,240	+0.22%
2018	62,241	+1.69%
2023	64,695	+0.78%

Napier City had a population of 64,695 in the 2023 New Zealand census, an increase of 2,454 people (3.9%) since the 2018 census, and an increase of 7,455 people (13.0%) since the 2013 census. There were 31,212 males, 33,270 females and 213 people of other genders in 24,858 dwellings. 2.6% of people identified as LGBTIQ+. The median age was 42.0 years (compared with 38.1 years nationally). There were 11,913 people (18.4%) aged under 15 years, 11,115 (17.2%) aged 15 to 29, 27,990 (43.3%) aged 30 to 64, and 13,674 (21.1%) aged 65 or older.

People could identify as more than one ethnicity. The results were 79.0% European (Pākehā); 24.2% Māori; 4.2% Pasifika; 6.5% Asian; 1.0% Middle Eastern, Latin American and African New Zealanders (MELAA); and 2.6% other, which includes people giving their ethnicity as "New Zealander". English was spoken by 96.9%, Māori language by 5.7%, Samoan by 1.3% and other languages by 8.1%. No language could be spoken by 1.8% (e.g. too young to talk). New Zealand Sign Language was known by 0.6%. The percentage of people born overseas was 17.9, compared with 28.8% nationally.

Religious affiliations were 30.6% Christian, 0.9% Hindu, 0.4% Islam, 2.7% Māori religious beliefs, 0.8% Buddhist, 0.5% New Age, 0.1% Jewish, and 1.4% other religions. People who answered that they had no religion were 55.8%, and 6.9% of people did not answer the census question.

Of those at least 15 years old, 7,893 (15.0%) people had a bachelor's or higher degree, 29,085 (55.1%) had a post-high school certificate or diploma, and 13,293 (25.2%) people exclusively held high school qualifications. The median income was $39,200, compared with $41,500 nationally. 4,845 people (9.2%) earned over $100,000 compared to 12.1% nationally. The employment status of those at least 15 was that 25,656 (48.6%) people were employed full-time, 6,813 (12.9%) were part-time, and 1,452 (2.8%) were unemployed.

== Tourism and architecture ==
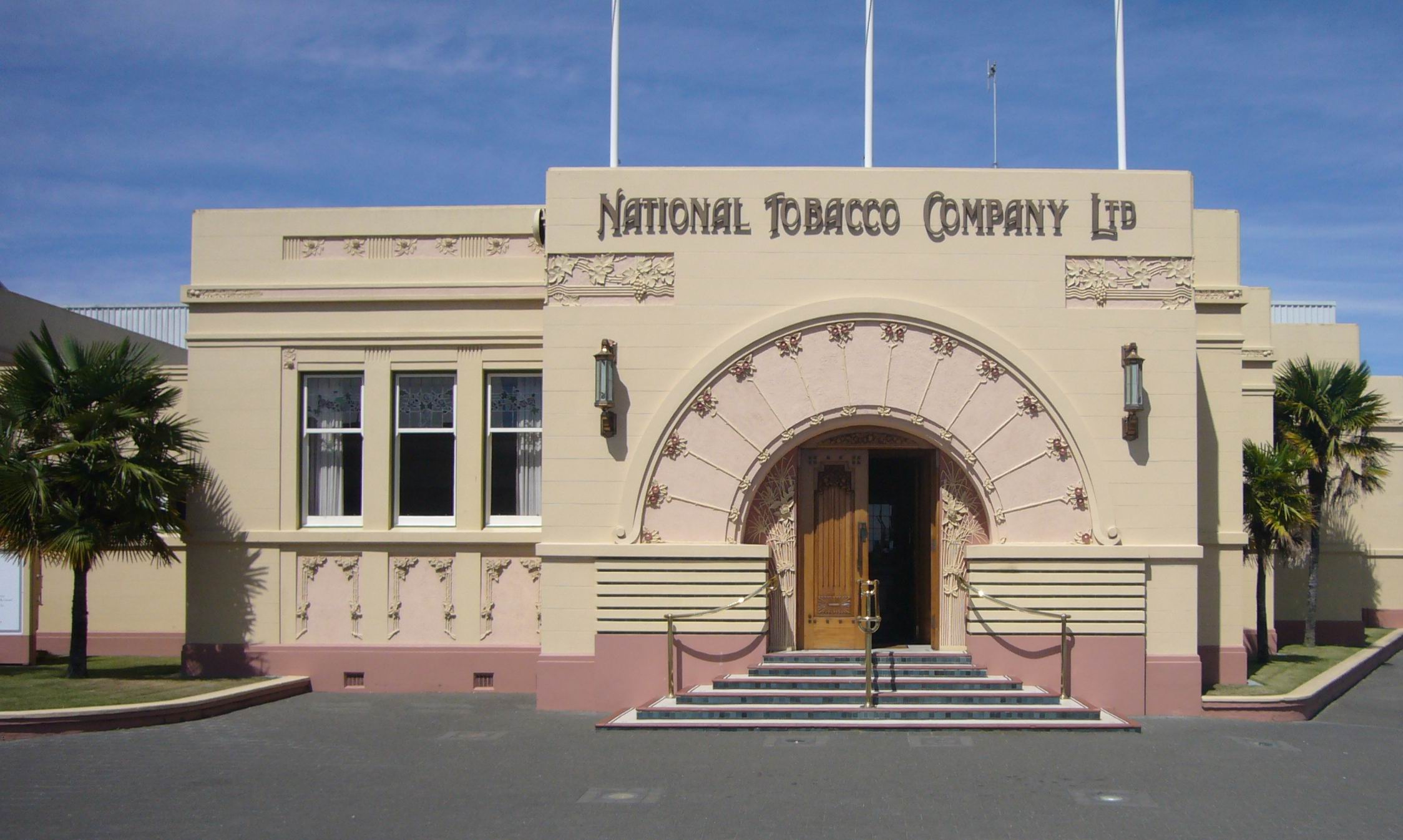
National Tobacco Company building (1933)

Napier's major tourist attraction is its architecture, which draws Art Deco and architecture enthusiasts from around the world. The rebuilding period after the 1931 earthquake coincided with the short-lived and rapidly changing Art Deco era and the Great Depression, when little "mainstreet" development was being undertaken elsewhere. As a result, Napier's architecture is strikingly different from any other city; the other notable Art Deco city, Miami Beach, has Streamline Moderne Art Deco. The whole centre of Napier was rebuilt simultaneously.

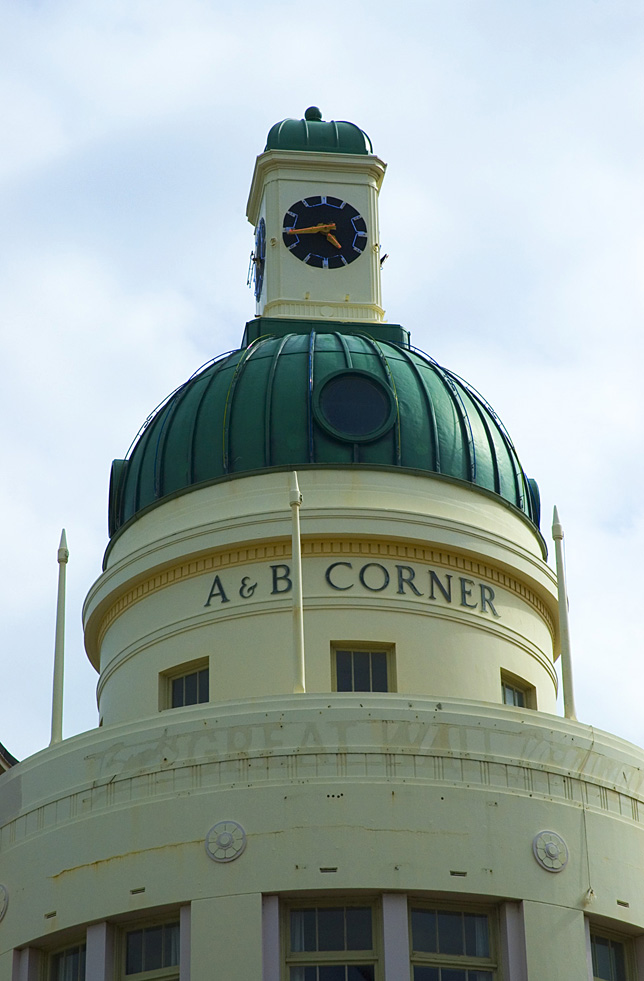
The T & G Building (Atkin & Mitchell, Wellington, 1936)

Pania of the Reef

Other tourist attractions in Napier include MTG Hawke's Bay (the museum, art gallery and theatre) which features information on both the 1931 earthquake and Napier's redesign as an Art Deco city, the National Aquarium, the Napier Prison, the Soundshell and the Pania of the Reef statue. The Pania statue on Marine Parade is regarded in Napier in much the same way that the Little Mermaid statue is regarded in Copenhagen. In October 2005, the statue was stolen, but it was recovered a week later, largely unharmed. Marineland was a tourist attraction from 1965 until it closed in 2009.

The National Aquarium is one of the foremost aquariums in New Zealand. The historic Napier Prison is the oldest prison in New Zealand and visitors can learn about the history of prisons as well as witness the path of the 1931 earthquake. It is the only place in Napier where some of the earthquake damage has been left in place. Since 1988, tourists have flocked to Napier for the annual Art Deco Festival in February. In 2018, the festival celebrated its 30th year, attracting an estimated 45,000 people. The Mission Estate Winery Concert in the Napier suburb of Greenmeadows which has featured Chris De Burgh, Olivia Newton-John, Eric Clapton, Kenny Rogers, Ray Charles, Rod Stewart, Sting performing with the NZ Symphony Orchestra, Shirley Bassey, Beach Boys, Doobie Brothers, Tom Jones, and in 2013 Barry Gibb with Carol King.

Attractions nearby include the Cape Kidnappers Gannet Colony and many vineyards bordering Taradale, Hastings City, and north of Napier around Bay View and the Esk Valley.

Many people use Napier as a gateway to Hawke's Bay, flying in to Hawke's Bay Airport at Westshore from Wellington City, Auckland and Christchurch. Tourists also enter Napier by State Highway 2 along the coast and State Highway 5 from Taupō. The rail line in and out of Hawke's Bay had a passenger service until 2001.

== Culture and entertainment ==
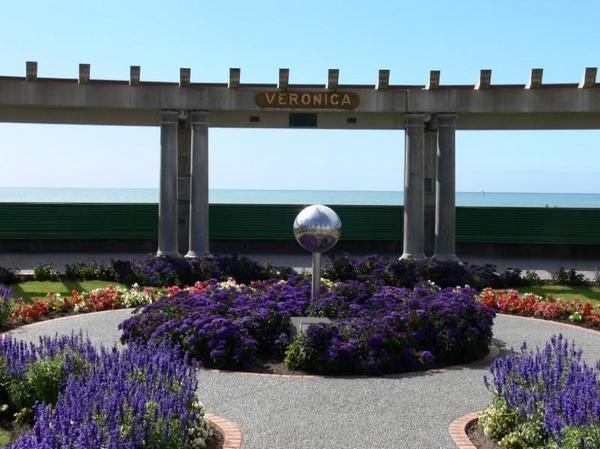
Veronica Sunbay overlooking the sea on Marine Parade

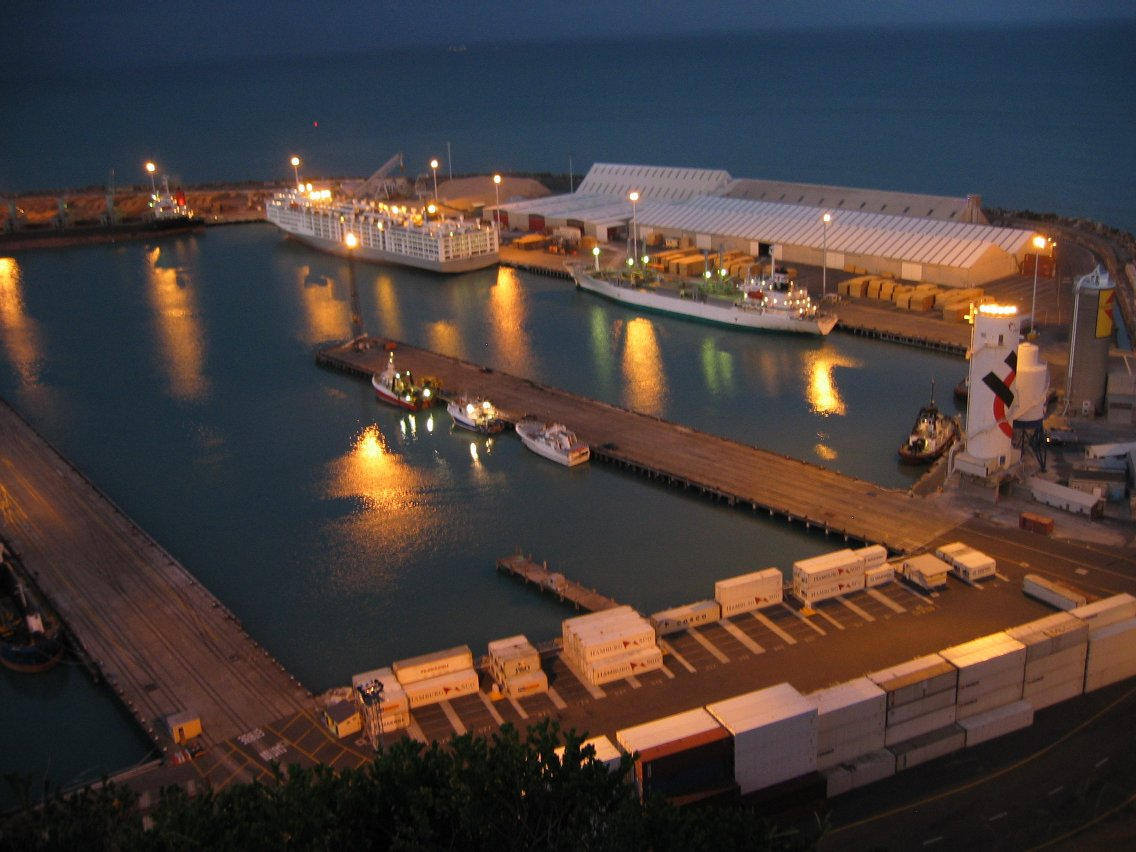
Napier Port at night

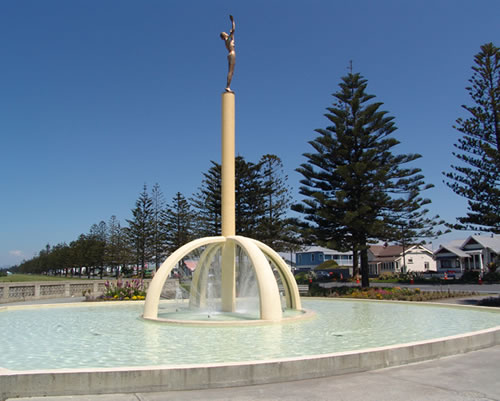
Spirit of Napier, or Gilray Fountain, on Marine Parade

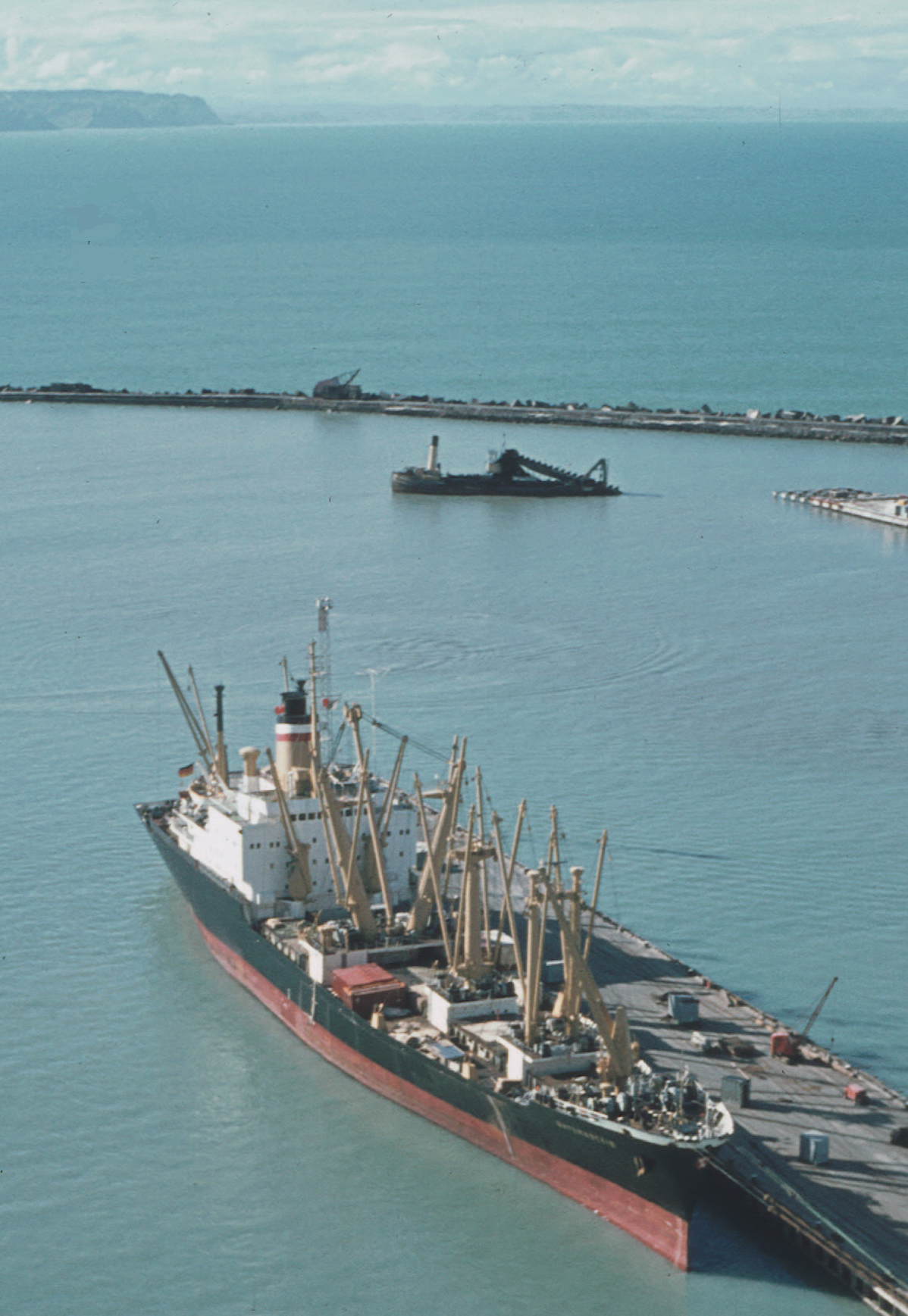
Cargo ship at the port, 1973

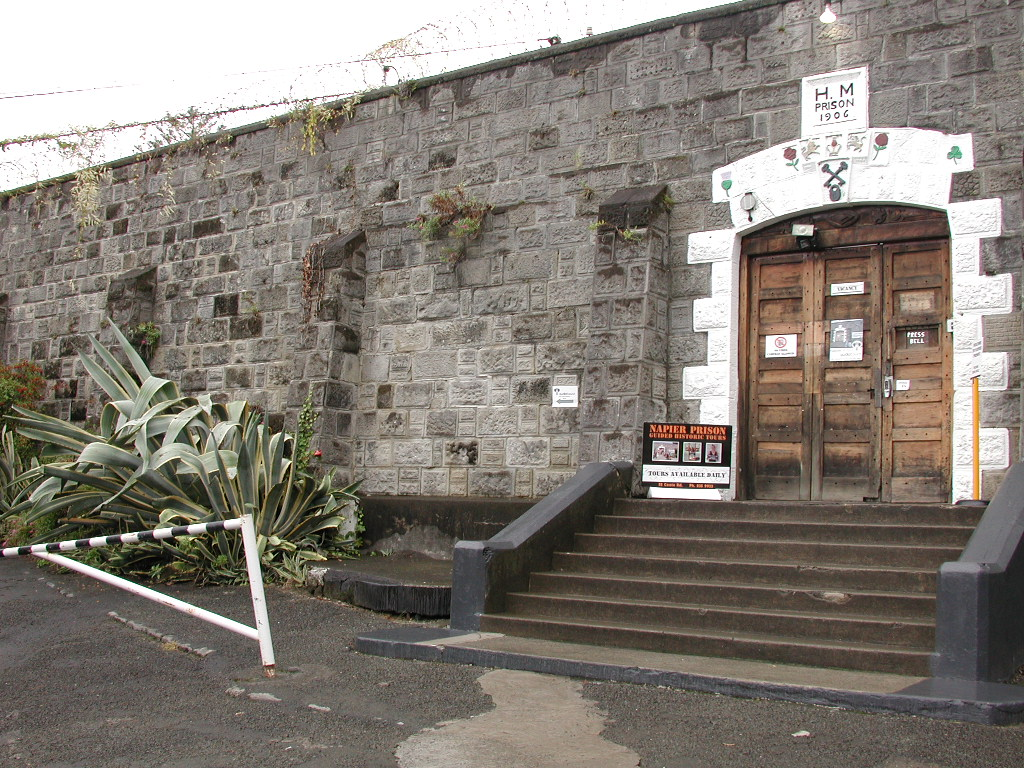
Exterior of the prison tourist attraction, 2010

Napier markets itself as the Art Deco Capital. The Hawke's Bay wine region is important to Napier's economy, with over 70 wineries located in the area. The region featured in Wine Enthusiast Magazine as one of the 10 Best Wine Travel Destinations in 2015. The region is New Zealand's largest apple, pear and stone fruit producer. Napier Port and the rail network provides quick export of these goods.

A large attraction is the Art Deco building designs. Marine Parade is one of Napier's most famous highlights – a tree-lined ocean boulevard with fountains, gardens, mini golf, statues and spas. The National Aquarium is at the south end of Marine Parade. The historic Napier Prison is located off the northern end of Marine Parade. Recent redevelopments of Marine Parade have seen the addition of shaded picnic areas and playgrounds. Napier's theatre scene includes productions put on by the Napier Operatic Society, based at the Tabard Theatre and putting on musicals at the Napier Municipal Theatre, another notable example of Art Deco architecture. There are high street and boutique stores as well as antique shops, art galleries, and studios of potters, wood turners and craftsman.

The marina and waterfront in Ahuriri is a sea-tourism attraction. Swimming and family activities are popular in Pandora Pond – a salt water inlet by the inner harbour in Ahuriri – or on the beaches and playgrounds of Marine Parade, Westshore, and Ahuriri. The several rivers that flow through the region are used for water activities, such as jet boating, jet skiing, rowing, kayaking, fishing, whitebaiting and swimming.

Development of the region's cycleways and walkways has included dedicated cycle lanes being established on urban streets in the Napier-Hastings urban areas, as well as a large variety of off-road pathways, which are often used as mixed use pathways for cyclists and pedestrians, such as the paths that stretch from Bay View to Clifton. The Hawke's Bay Trails contain nearly 200 km of cycleways that meander through and around the cities, and link the Napier-Hastings urban areas with surrounding suburbs and the local district.

The annual model aircraft show 'Warbirds over Awatoto' takes place on the outskirts of Napier. The 2013 gathering attracted 48 pilots and 120 planes.

== Economy ==
The largest industry in Napier and its environs is processing/manufacturing, the major products being food, textiles, wood, metal products and machinery/equipment. Other significant industries for the region include property/business services, rural production/rural services and retail.

Napier was once home to one of New Zealand's largest smoking tobacco plants. On 9 September 2005 British American Tobacco announced it would close the Rothmans factory, due to diminished demand. Production has moved to Australia. The Art Deco-style factory had been producing up to 2.2 billion cigarettes a year for the New Zealand and Pacific Island markets. In March 1999, 19 people lost their jobs there because "fewer people are smoking".

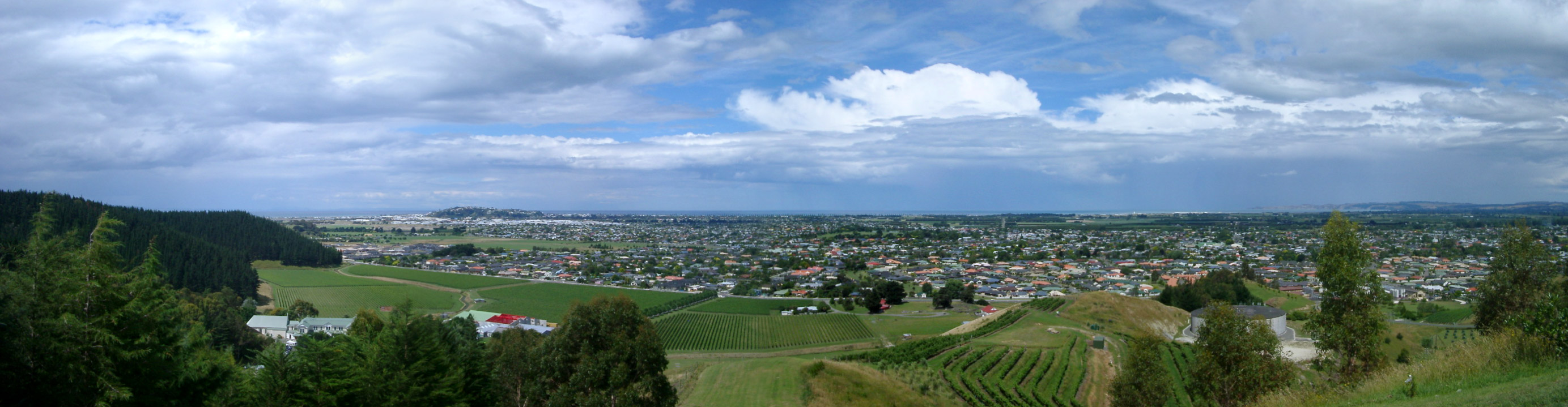
View of Napier and Taradale from Sugar Loaf (behind Mission Winery)

== Government ==
=== Local ===
Napier has been governed by Napier City Council since 1950.

Local government reform was mooted in the late 1990s and a referendum was held in 1999 proposing an amalgamation of the Hastings District Council with the Napier City Council. Although supported by approximately two-thirds of Hastings voters, Napier voters rejected the proposal by a similar number and the proposal was defeated.

The National Government amended the Local Government Act in 2012 to determine a reorganisation proposal by a majority vote over the entire proposed area, rather than a majority over each existing area, as was previously the case. Yet another change was to allow private submissions to the commission to trigger the process, whereas previously only local councils themselves could request a change in structure or boundary. The legislative restrictions on councils using public funds to support or challenge a final proposal did not apply to private lobby groups or individuals, however.

After a lengthy and divisive regional campaign to restructure local government in Hawke's Bay, in 2015 the Local Government Commission put forward a final reorganisation proposal to amalgamate Napier City Council with Wairoa District Council, Hastings District Council and Central Hawke's Bay District Council to form a proposed 'Hawke's Bay Council'. A postal ballot was established to maximise voter returns, and the vote closed on 15 September 2015. An interim count was available later that day, that saw the proposal defeated across the region by about 66%. In Napier, the proposal was rejected by 84% of voters.

=== National ===
The city is part of the Napier general electorate and the Ikaroa-Rāwhiti Māori electorate. In the 2023 general election, Napier was won by Katie Nimon of the National Party and Ikaroa-Rāwhiti by Cushla Tangaere-Manuel, of the Labour Party.

== Sport ==
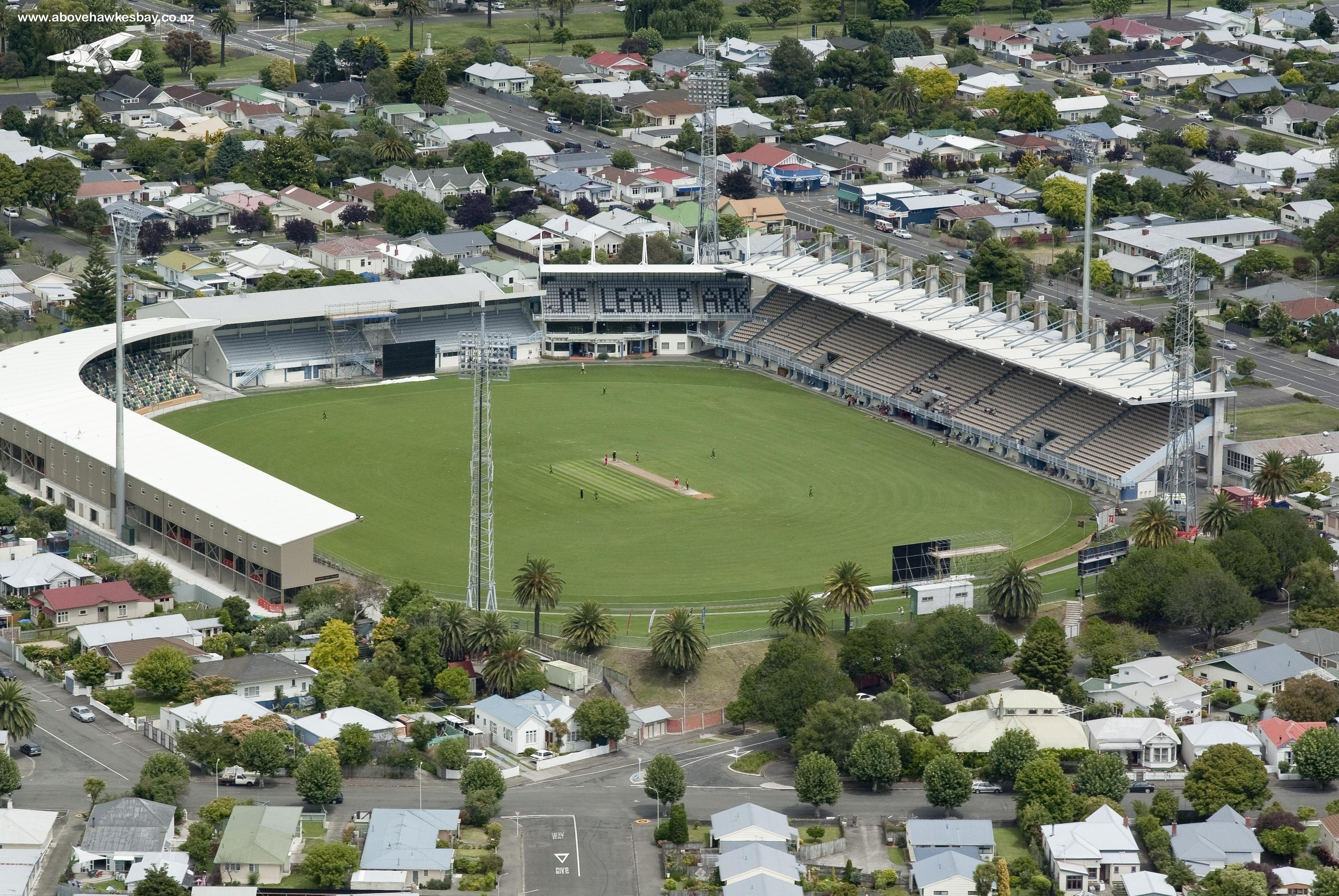
McLean Park

McLean Park is the main sporting venue in Hawke's Bay. The main sports played at the venue are cricket and rugby union. It was used to host matches during the 1987 Rugby World Cup, the 2011 Rugby World Cup and the 2015 Cricket World Cup.

The city is home to the professional basketball team Hawke's Bay Hawks, which plays in the National Basketball League. It plays its home games in the Pettigrew Green Arena.

Meeanee Speedway is a motorcycle speedway venue, located in Meeanee, on Sandy Road. The track races various types of cars, in addition to motorcycle speedway. It opened in 1961 and is the home of Hawkes Bay Speedway Club. It has held important speedway events, including qualifying rounds of the Speedway World Championship and finals of the New Zealand Solo Championship.

== Transportation ==
=== Air ===
Hawke's Bay Airport is the main airport in the Hawke's Bay region and has domestic flight services. It is jointly owned by the government, Napier City Council, and Hastings District Council, and is operated by Hawke's Bay Airport Ltd. The airport is located in the Napier suburb of Westshore. Air New Zealand provides frequent direct flights to and from Auckland, Wellington and Christchurch. Sunair serves Tauranga, Hamilton, Gisborne and Wairoa. Jetstar, a Qantas subsidiary, served Auckland from 2015 to 2019 and Sounds Air used to operate direct flights to Blenheim daily. Smaller charter companies also operate, including Air Napier to Gisborne. The airport was historically referred to as Napier Airport, and its IATA code reflects that: NPE. It is situated on land that was formerly the Ahuriri Lagoon, an area that was raised above sea level by the 1931 Napier earthquake. The airport is located approximately 22 km north of Hastings Aerodrome, a smaller airport located close to Hastings that caters mainly for flight training and general aviation.

=== Pathways ===
The Hawke's Bay region has extensive cycleways and footpaths that originally began as the 'Rotary Pathways' between Napier and Hastings, and is now known as the 'Hawke's Bay Trails'. The network of pathways links the urban areas of Napier and Hastings, as well as many of the other outlying suburbs of the two cities. Some of the cycleways include dedicated cycling lanes on roads within the city, as well as separate dedicated pathways on roadsides and through parks and other areas, many of which are mixed use pathways for cyclists and pedestrians, such as the paths that stretch from Bay View to Clifton. The Hawke's Bay Trails contain over 200 km of cycleways that meander through and around the Napier-Hastings twin cities. The Napier Rotary Pathway creates a loop that encompasses the city from Esk River, to Westshore, Napier Central, Awatoto, Taradale, Poraiti, and looping back to the Esk Valley. This rotary also has several links to the Hastings Rotary Pathway.

=== Roads ===
State Highway 2 is the principal state highway serving Napier, connecting it to Wairoa and Gisborne to the north, and, via Dannevirke, to Wellington, Masterton and Palmerston North to the south. Between Napier and Hastings, SH 2 follows the Hawke's Bay Expressway, also known as the Napier-Hastings Expressway, which provides a direct and efficient link between the two cities. Although the Hawke's Bay Expressway bypasses Napier itself, it has connections to many of Napier's arterial roads that lead to the city centre and the port (such as the junctions at Kennedy Road, Taradale Road, Prebensen Drive and Meeanee Quay) and also intersects with the access road to Hawke's Bay Airport.

State Highway 5, known as the Napier-Taupo Road, begins at a junction on SH 2 just north of the Napier suburb of Bay View, and connects Napier and the Hawke's Bay region to Taupō and the central North Island. It is also the main route used for traffic travelling from Napier-Hastings to Auckland, Hamilton, Rotorua and Tauranga, as it is quicker than the route through Gisborne taken by SH 2.

State Highway 50 connects Napier to the southwestern Hawke's Bay, going through many small settlements. It also connects Napier to many of Hawke's Bay's wineries, of which the region is well known for. It makes up part of the Hawke's Bay Wine Trail.

State Highway 51 is an alternative connection between Napier and Hastings, and largely follows the original route of SH 2 between the two cities prior to the completion of the Hawke's Bay Expressway, and SH 2 being shifted to run along it. While the original route followed Meeanee Quay through the suburbs of Westshore and Ahuriri before bridging across the Pandora Pond area of the Napier Inner Harbour marina, the SH 51 route follows Taradale Road instead, meeting up with the original SH 2 route at the southern base of Napier Hill at Hyderabad Road. The route then moves onto Georges Drive, where it borders the southern and western edges of the Napier city centre. It meets up with Marine Parade south of the CBD, and then follows the coast south from Napier through Clive to Hastings.

==== Buses ====
Go Bus operates 9 Go Bay routes in Napier, with funding from Regional Council. Bee Cards replaced goBay cards in August 2020.

=== Rail ===
The Palmerston North–Gisborne Line runs through Napier. The southern portion of the line between Napier and Palmerston North was built between 1872 and 1891, and the northern portion between Napier and Gisborne from 1912 to 1942. The line from Gisborne enters Napier via the coast, making its way through the city, before eventually turning inland towards Hastings, and onwards to Woodville (where the Wairarapa Line branches off) and Palmerston North.

The Napier Port Branch, formerly known as the Ahuriri Branch, is a 2 km railway branch line off the Palmerston North-Gisborne Line that serves Napier Port. Napier Railway Station was the main railway station in Napier and an intermediate stop on the Palmerston North-Gisborne Line. It opened on 12 October 1874, when the station and the first section of the line between Napier and Hastings was opened. The line through the Manawatū Gorge to Palmerston North and hence to Wellington was opened on 9 March 1891. The line north of Napier to Gisborne was opened on 3 August 1942, with passenger services from 7 September. Napier was the terminus for both Gisborne and Wellington goods trains, though some passenger trains ran straight through.

The original Napier station building was on the corner of Station Street and Millar Street, close to the centre of Napier. The facilities on the site increased to include the passenger station plus a goods yard, locomotive depot, workshop and a way and works branch. The line was on a curve and difficult to work, and the site was limited by level crossings at each end and with no room for expansion.

Hence, in a two-year programme to 1991, most functions followed the Way and Works to Pandora Point, at the start of the Ahuriri Branch, leaving only a new InterCity coach and train terminal on the city site, fronting Munroe Street. The old station was closed on 6 October 1990, and was replaced by a new station on 9 June 1991. The existing station and three-story administrative block built in the late 1950s and early 1960s were demolished and some three hectares of land was available for retail development.

A marshalling yard, freight terminal, locomotive depot and other facilities were established at Pandora Point, with a triangle provided to turn trains and giving direct access north and south from the port branch. The Ahuriri yard was closed. The old main line north to Gisborne was realigned to the east to allow a new link road to the Tamatea area of Napier, and railways land was redeveloped as an industrial subdivision. On 7 October 2001 the Bay Express from Wellington to Napier was cancelled and passenger services on the line ceased.

A tram service ran between Napier South and Port Ahuriri from 1913 to 1931.

== Infrastructure and services ==
=== Health ===
Napier Hospital opened on what is now Hospital Hill in 1880. During the 1990s, hospital services in the Hawke's Bay were rationalised, culminating in Napier Hospital closing in 1998 and most services transferred to Hastings Hospital (now Hawke's Bay Fallen Soldiers' Memorial Hospital).

In addition to the services provided by Hawke's Bay Hospital, the Hawke's Bay District Health Board operates a 24-hour urgent care and outpatient clinic located in central Napier.

=== Energy ===
Town gas supply to Napier began in January 1876 following the completion of the Napier gas works on the corner of Wellesley Road and Sale Street. The Napier Borough Council established its first gas street lights in 1879.

The Napier Municipal Electricity Department (MED) established the city's first public supply in September 1913, using town gas and later diesel engines for generation and supplied consumers with 230/460 volts DC. Street lighting switched to electricity in 1915. Conversion to the now-standard 230/400 volts AC began in 1925 with the commissioning of a 400 kW Fullager diesel generator, ahead of the arrival of grid power from Mangahao in 1927 and from Waikaremoana in 1929. The Fullager generator remained in service as a peaking plant until it was decommissioned in 1970. Taradale and rural areas around the city were supplied by the Hawke's Bay Electric Power Board, formed in 1924.

Natural gas arrived in Napier and Hastings in 1983, with the completion of the high-pressure pipeline from Kapuni gas field in Taranaki via Palmerston North to the cities. Town gas consumers were converted to natural gas over the next five years, culminating in the Napier gas works closing on 21 March 1988.

In 1991, the MED merged with the Electric Power Board, later renamed Hawke's Bay Power. The 1998 electricity sector reforms saw the retail base sold to Contact Energy, with the remaining lines business renamed Hawke's Bay Networks and later Unison Networks.

In February 2004, the city and wider Hawke's Bay region lost natural gas supply for six days after a flood washed away a bridge near Ashhurst supporting the high-pressure pipeline to the region.

=== Water supply and sanitation ===
Napier's reticulated water supply is drawn from the Heretaunga Plains artesian aquifer below the city through seven bores. The city's water demand averages 27,500 m^{3} (970,000 cu ft) per day, with demand in summer peaking at 39,400 m^{3} (1,390,000 cu ft) per day.

The city's wastewater plant is at Awatoto, and treated wastewater is discharged into Hawke Bay via a 1.5 km (0.9 mi) outfall pipe. The Awatoto wastewater plant and outfall were opened in 1973, replacing the previous outfall at Perfume Point in Ahuriri. The wastewater plant was initially a comminutor station and was upgraded in 1991 with milliscreens and in 2014 with biological trickling filters.

== Schools and higher education ==
Napier has five state secondary schools: Napier Boys' High School, Napier Girls' High School, William Colenso College, Tamatea High School and Taradale High School. Other secondary schools include Sacred Heart College and St Joseph's Māori Girls' College, both state integrated Catholic girls' schools, and Te Kura Kaupapa Māori o Te Ara Hou, a Māori language immersion school.

The Eastern Institute of Technology in Taradale is the main tertiary education provider for Napier and the Hawke's Bay.

== Media ==
The Hastings-based Hawke's Bay Today is the main daily newspaper serving Napier. The newspaper was established in 1999 following the merger of the Napier-based The Daily Telegraph with the Hastings-based Hawke's Bay Herald-Tribune.

The city's main television and FM radio transmitter is the Mount Erin transmitter atop Kohinurākau, 28 km (17 mi) south-southwest of central Napier. Television arrived in the city in 1962 with the commissioning of a private translator relaying Wellington's WNTV1 (now part of TVNZ 1). Official coverage came in 1966 with the commissioning of the Mount Erin transmitter.

== Notable people ==
- Sir Ian Axford – space scientist
- Mike Boon – comedian
- Adele Broadbent (born 1968), children's author
- Sir Ashley Bloomfield – Chief Executive of the Ministry of Health and the country's Director-General of Health, born in Napier
- Frank Livingstone Combs – Teacher and author, born in Napier
- Thomas Allan Napier Corson – businessman and local politician, born in Napier
- Jamie Curry – YouTube Personality
- Archibald George William Dunningham – one of the founders of modern librarianship in New Zealand
- Borneo Gardiner – professional siffleur (whistler), born in Napier, who performed internationally
- Spencer Gollan – sportsman and racehorse owner
- Debbie Harwood – singer with When The Cat's Away
- Paul Henare – basketball player for the New Zealand Breakers and the Tall Blacks
- Alfred Hindmarsh – politician
- Chris Jackson – former New Zealand international and Napier City Rovers association football player
- Anna Kavan, British novelist, lived in Napier in 1942–43
- Phil Lamason – WWII pilot – born in Napier
- Simon Mannering – New Zealand Warriors rugby league player and captain
- Paratene Matchitt – artist
- Stuart Nash – politician
- Dean Parker – writer and political commentator (born in Napier)
- Nyree Dawn Porter – actress
- John Psathas – composer
- Major General Sir Andrew Hamilton Russell KCB, KCMG – born in Napier
- Renée – feminist writer, playwright, novelist and short story writer
- Darren Smith – field hockey player
- Anna Elizabeth Jerome Spencer- Educator
- Percy Storkey – soldier and Victoria Cross winner
- Chris Tremain – politician
- Kel Tremain – rugby player
- Shane Young – Mixed Martial Arts fighter
- Anna-Louise Plowman – actress

== Sister cities ==
Napier City Council recognises three sister city relationships:

- Lianyungang, Jiangsu, China
- Tomakomai, Japan
- Victoria, British Columbia, Canada
