= Borneo Gardiner =

Ralph Wilfred Borneo Gardiner (1891 – 1922) was a New Zealand siffleur (whistling performer). Better known as Borneo Gardiner, he imitated bird calls and songs. He was recorded on Pathé Frères 29001. The recordings of him whistling are to "Il Bacio" and a waltz. The National Museum of Australia has a photograph of him and a recording of one of his performances in its website.

He performed in Wellington, New Zealand as a young man in 1909 before departing for England in 1912. He was photographed in South Africa in 1912 including by a billboard advertising him as the Great New Zealand Whistler. He sent a postcard from Sydney in 1913. His whistling accompanied a ballet in 1914. In 1918 he was scheduled to perform with others at Victoria Palace. He was back in New Zealand in 1919. But he returned to London and had success performing at London vaudeville venues in 2020.

In 1919 he was part of a performance headlined by Florence Parbury for wounded soldiers at Daly's Theatre.

He died in London in March 1922.
