= Statue of Pania =

Statue in Napier, New Zealand

Pania of the Reef
- Year: 1954
- Type: bronze
- Dimensions: 1.5 m (4.9 ft)
- Location: Napier, New Zealand

The Statue of Pania (also known as Pania of the Reef) is located on Marine Parade in Napier, New Zealand, and honours the life of Pania, a figure of Māori mythology.

The statue was commissioned by members of the Thirty Thousand Club after the Anglican Bishop of Aotearoa, Frederick Bennett, related the legend of Pania to them. Several students from Hukarere Girls College were photographed as models for the statue, and eventually, Mei Irihapiti Robin (later Mei Whaitiri, the mother of local MP Meka Whaitiri), was selected.

A traditional piupiu skirt, and the photographs of Mei, were sent to the Italian marble company of Carrara in Carrara, Italy and used to create a clay model. This clay model was then used to produce the bronze statue, which is estimated to weigh between 60 and 70 kg. The statue was unveiled on 10 June 1954 by then Prime Minister Sidney Holland.

The statue has often been compared to The Little Mermaid statue in Copenhagen; there is a resemblance between the two figures, as both statues are small, bronze, and near the ocean, and both are based on similar stories.

In 1982, the statue was shot in the head. The damage was later repaired.

On 27 October 2005, the statue was stolen, but was discovered by Jeff Foley and recovered by police on 4 November. The statue was restored, then replaced on 16 November 2005.

Mei Whaitiri, the model for the statue, died on 21 November 2024.
