= Marine Parade, Napier =

Thoroughfare in Napier, New Zealand

Marine Parade
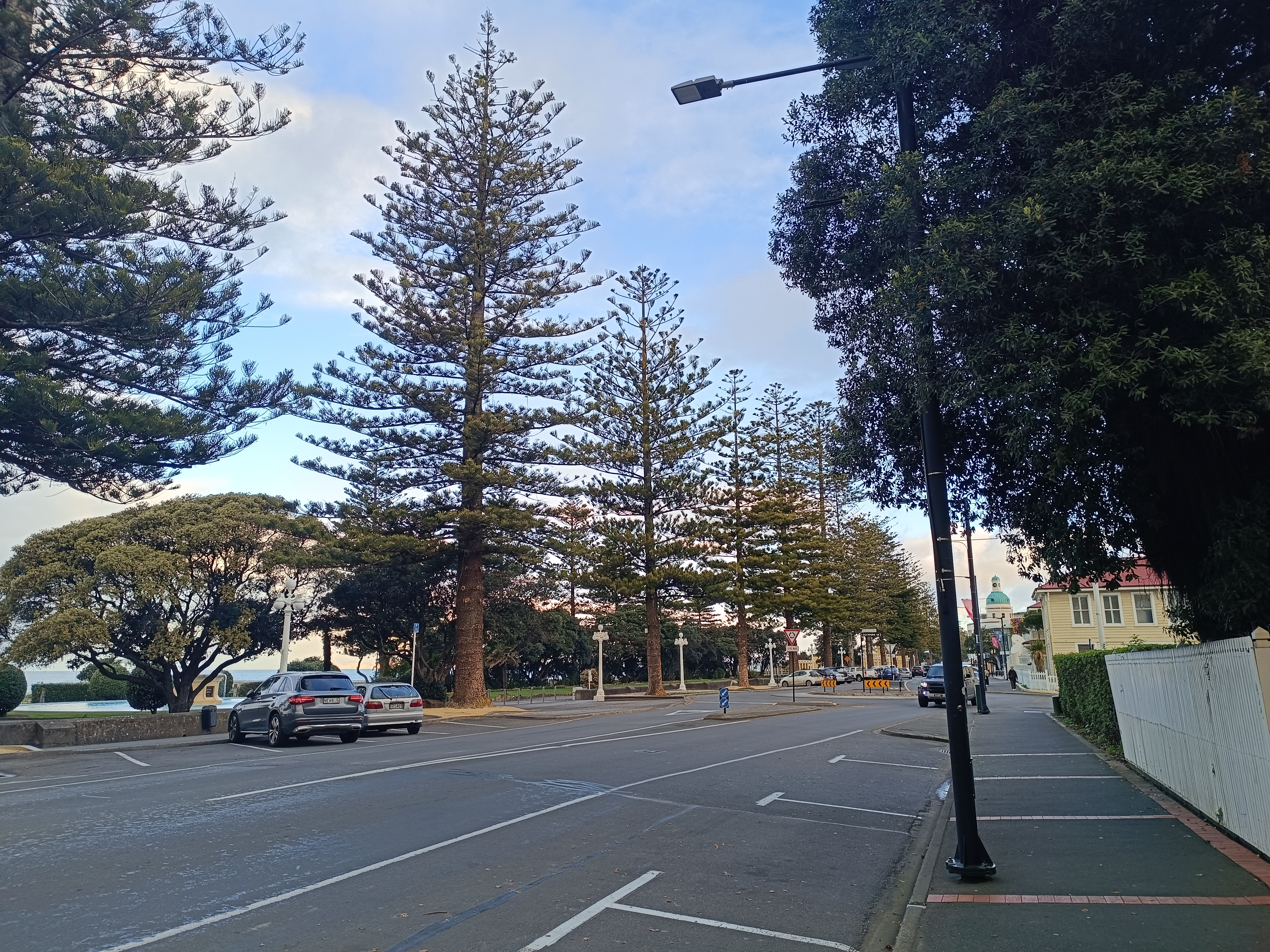
- View down Marine Parade, Napier
- Location: Bluff Hill, Napier South
- Coordinates: 39°30′00″S 176°55′07″E
- North end: Coote Road; Breakwater Road
- South end: Ellison Street; Napier Road

Marine Parade is a major thoroughfare, combining roadway and esplanade, running along the foreshore in the city of Napier, on Hawke Bay in the North Island of New Zealand. A 3-kilometre tree-lined ocean boulevard beside the CBD and Napier South, it is a major tourist attraction, running close to many of the Art Deco buildings for which the city is known (much of the city having been rebuilt in the 1930s after the 1931 Hawke's Bay earthquake).

== Description ==
The ocean side of Marine Parade features gardens, fountains, statues, a pier-like viewing platform, an open air auditorium (the Sound Shell), the National Aquarium, a bathing pool complex, a mini-golf course, bike tracks and playgrounds. Most notable of the statues is Pania of the Reef, a legendary character who shares the same relationship with Napier that the Little Mermaid does with Copenhagen.

Among the historical and modern buildings on the town side of the street is MTG Hawke's Bay, a museum, theatre and art gallery, formerly the Hawke's Bay Museum. The street has a number of bars, cafes, restaurants and ice-cream shops, mostly on the town side. The Pacific Ocean is easily accessible alongside Marine Parade, but swimming is not recommended due to a steep drop-off in the beach and a strong undertow.

== History ==
The parade developed along an 1889 sea wall, alongside which Norfolk pines were planted in 1893. Following the 1931 earthquake, part of the foreshore was reclaimed with rubble from destroyed buildings. Since then most of the foreshore area has been built by the sea through natural accretion, part of which has become the Marine Parade Foreshore Reserve. Marineland, a marine mammal park featuring performing dolphins, seals and other marine life, was the major attraction for many years from its opening in 1965 – it closed to the public in 2008 with the death of its last dolphin.

== Gallery ==
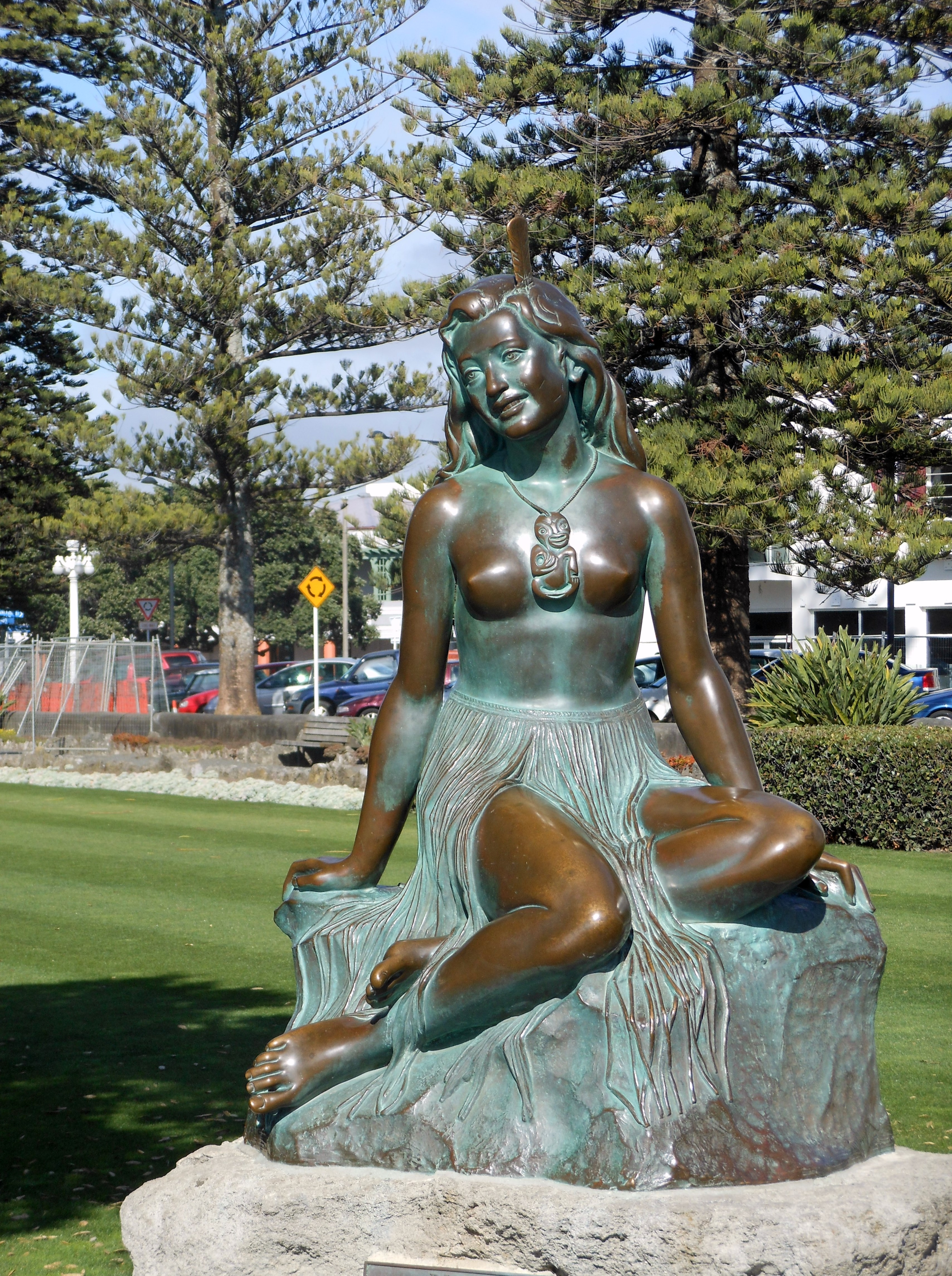
Pania of the Reef

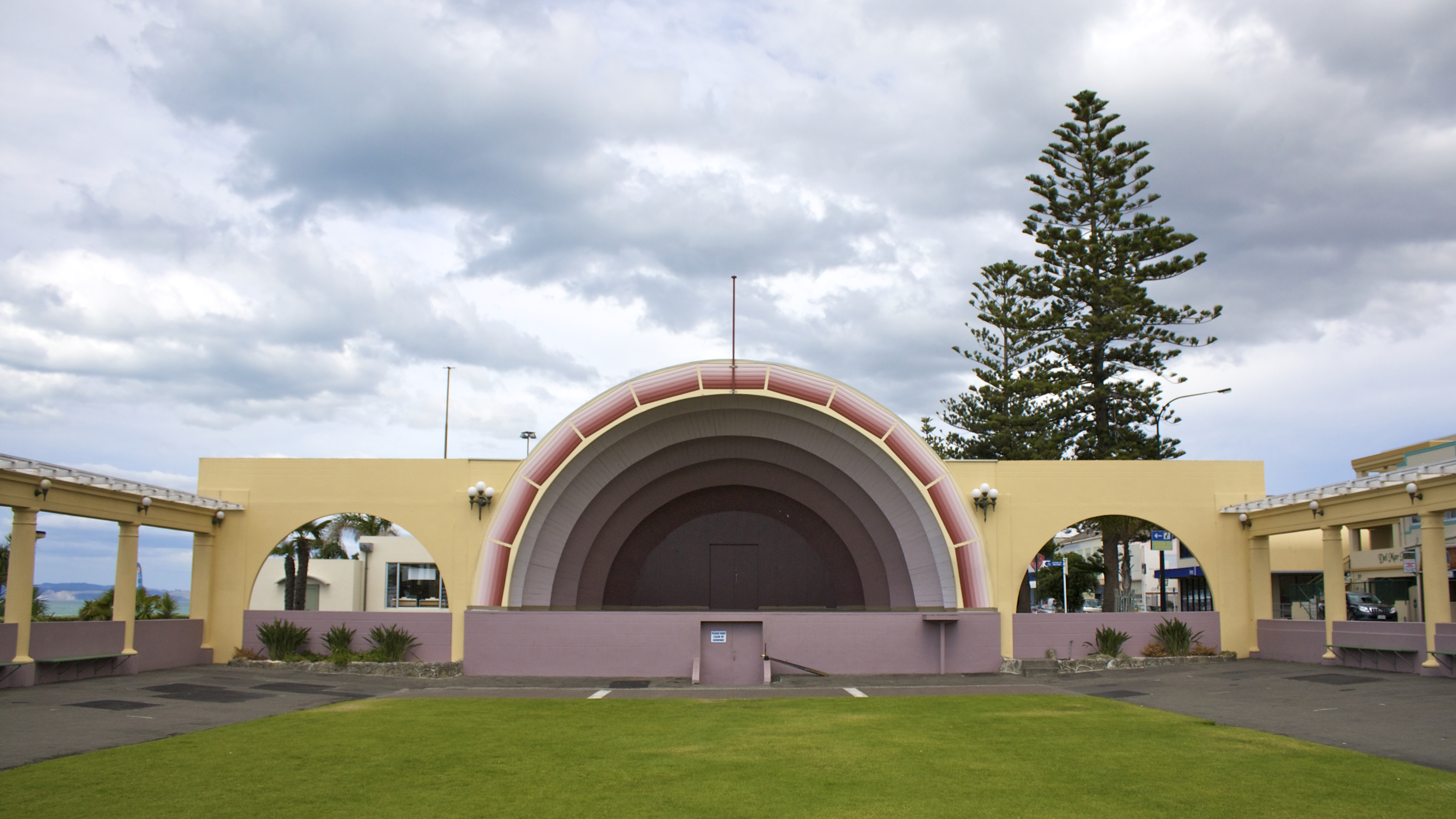
The Art Deco Sound Shell

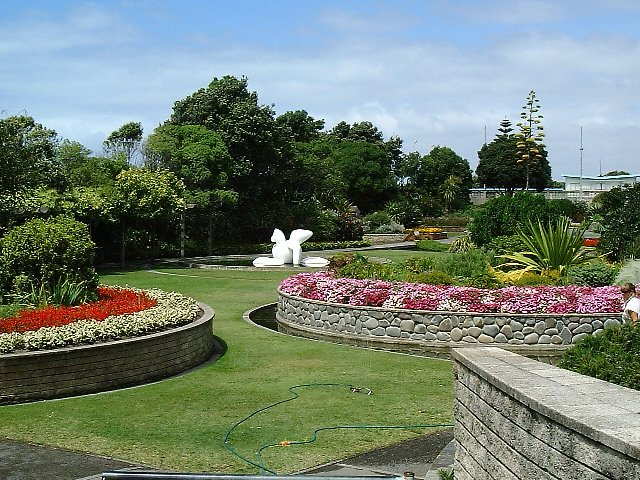
The Sunken Garden

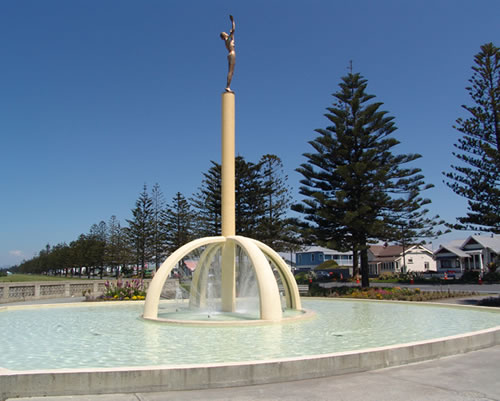
The Gilray Fountain, better known as the Spirit of Napier
