= Babić =

Babić (Serbian Cyrillic: Бабић) is a Croatian, Bosniak and Serbian family name. It is the 3rd most frequent surname in Croatia.

== Geographical distribution ==
As of 2014, the frequency of the surname Babić was highest in Bosnia and Herzegovina (1: 298), followed by Croatia (1: 394), Serbia (1: 470), Montenegro (1: 715) and Slovenia (1: 801).

== People ==
Notable people with the surname include:

- Alen Babić (born 1990), Croatian boxer
- Andro Babić (born 2004), Croatian footballer
- Anto Babić (1899–1974), Bosnian historian
- Bekim Babić (born 1975), Bosnian-Herzegovinian cross-country skier
- Branko Babić (born 1950), Serbian football manager and former player
- Dejan Babić (born 1989), Serbian footballer
- Dragan Babić (1937–2013), Serbian journalist
- Draginja Babić (1886–1915), Serbian doctor
- Dragutin Babić (1897–1945), Croatian footballer
- Dušan Babić (born 1986), Bosnian middle-distance runner
- Franjo Babić (1908–1945), Croatian writer and journalist
- Golub Babić (1824–1910), Bosnian Serb guerilla chief
- Gregory Victor Babic (born 1963), Australian author
- Filip Babić (born 1995), Serbian footballer
- Ilija Babić (born 2002), Serbian footballer
- Ivan Babić (1904–1982), Croatian soldier
- Ivan Babić (born 1981), Serbian footballer
- Ivan Babić (born 1984), Croatian footballer
- Krunoslav Babić (1875–1953), Croatian zoologist
- Lavra Babič (born 1987), Slovenian freestyle swimmer
- Ljubo Babić (1890–1974), Croatian painter
- Ljubomir Babić a.k.a. Ksaver Šandor Gjalski (1854–1935), Croatian writer
- Luka Babić (born 1991), Croatian basketball player
- Luka Babić (born 1994), Montenegrin volleyball player
- Mario Babić (born 1992), Croatian footballer
- Mark Babic (born 1973), Australian footballer
- Marko Babić (1965–2007), Croatian army officer
- Marko Babić (born 1981), Croatian footballer
- Matija Babić (born 1978), Croatian Internet journalist
- Matko Babić (born 1998), Croatian footballer
- Mijo Babić (1903–1941), Croatian fascist soldier
- Milan Babić (born 1955), Serbian footballer
- Milan Babić (1956–2006), Serbian leader
- Milenko Babić (born 1947), Serbian politician
- Milica Babić-Jovanović (1909–1968), Serbian costume designer
- Miloš Babić (1904–1968), Yugoslav artist
- Miloš Babić (born 1968), former Serbian basketball player
- Miloš Babić (born 1981), Bosnian-Herzegovinian footballer
- Nikola Babić (1905–1974), Croatian footballer
- Rašo Babić (born 1977), Serbian footballer
- Safet Babic (born 1981), German politician of Bosnian descent
- Saša Babić (born 1989), Croatian futsal player
- Sava Babić (1934–2012), Serbian writer
- Silvija Mrakovčić, née Babić, Croatian long jumper and triple jumper
- Siniša Babić (born 1991), Serbian footballer
- Snežana Babić (born 1967), Serbian singer and actress
- Srđan Babić (born 1996), Serbian footballer
- Staša Babić, Serbian archaeologist
- Stjepan Babić (1925–2021), Croatian linguist
- Toma Babić (c 1680–1750), Croatian writer and Franciscan priest
- Vanja Babić (born 1981), Serbian taekwondo player
- Vladica Babić (born 1995), Montenegrin tennis player
- Vlado Babić (born 1960), Serbian politician
- Valentin Babić (born 1981), Croatian footballer
- Zdenko Babić (born 1960), Croatian basketball player
- Željko Babić (born 1972), Croatian handball coach and former player
- Zeljko Babic a.k.a. Sean Babic (born 1976), former Australian footballer
- Zoran Babić (born 1971), Serbian politician

== See also ==
- Babich
- Babits
