= Babich =

Babich is a surname. Notable people with the surname include:

- Babette Babich (born 1956), American philosopher
- Bob Babich (disambiguation), multiple people, including:
  - Bob Babich (American football coach) (born 1961), American football coach
  - Bob Babich (linebacker) (1947–2022), American football player
- George Babich (1918–1984), American professional wrestler and college basketball head coach
- Iskra Babich (1932–2001), Soviet film director and screenwriter
- Ivan Babich (born 1982), Russian politician
- Joe Babich (1940–2022), New Zealand winemaker and businessman
- Johnny Babich (1913–2001), American baseball player
- Josip Babich (1895–1983), New Zealand gum-digger, winemaker and farmer
- Mikhail Babich (born 1969), Russian politician and member of the State Duma of the Russian Federation
- Shaikhzada Babich (1895–1919), Bashkir poet, writer and playwright
- Svetlana Babich (born 1947), Soviet female javelin thrower
- Valery Babich (born 1941), Ukrainian writer, journalist, and shipbuilder
- Yevgeny Babich (1921–1972), Russian ice hockey player

== See also ==
- Babić, standard Serbo-Croatian form
- Babych, standard Ukrainian form
