= Ivan Babić =

Ivan Babić may refer to:

- Ivan Babić (footballer, born 1981), Serbian football player
- Ivan Babić (footballer, born 1984), Croatian footballer
- Ivan Babić (officer) (1904–1982), Croatian soldier and lieutenant-colonel

== See also ==
- Babić
