= Krunoslav =

Krunoslav and its contraction Kruno is a Croatian male given name. Notable people with this name include:

- Krunoslav Babić (1875–1953), Croatian zoologist
- Krunoslav Draganović (1903–1983), Bosnian Croat priest and Ustaše functionary
- Krunoslav Hulak (1951–2015), Croatian chess player
- Kruno Ivančić (born 1994), Croatian football player
- Krunoslav Jurčić (born 1969), Croatian football manager and player
- Krunoslav Lovrek (born 1979), Croatian football player
- Kruno Prijatelj (1922–1998), Croatian art historian
- Krunoslav Rendulić (born 1973), Croatian football manager and player
- Krunoslav Simon (born 1985), Croatian basketball player
- Krunoslav Sekulic (born 1961), Austrian ice hockey player
- Krunoslav Slabinac (1944–2020), Croatian pop singer
