= Colin Love =

Australian rugby league administrator

Colin Love AM, (born 25 January 1945 in Australia) is the former chairman of the Rugby League International Federation (RLIF), New South Wales Rugby League (NSWRL) and Australian Rugby League (ARL). He was the seventh chairman of the ARL, and the eleventh of the NSWRL.

Love, who acquired his law degree at Sydney University after matriculating from Sydney Boys High School, graduating in 1961, began his association with rugby league when he was involved with contract negotiations for players in the late 1970s. He was retained as the league's solicitor soon afterwards; Love was an active participant as a solicitor for the ARL and Kerry Packer during the Super League war of the mid-1990s. Love was elected chairman of the ARL in 1999.

On Saturday, 26 January 2007, Love was appointed a Member of the Order of Australia for his contribution to both the sport of rugby league football and to sports law.

Love was succeeded as RLIF chairman in June 2011 by Scott Carter.

== 2008 World Cup controversy ==
Colin Love came under attack in August 2007 from the Daily Telegraph with a piece written by Josh Massoud that claimed that he acted unscrupulously in regard to the position for organising the Rugby League World Cup as well as acting with undue regard in relation to how Love executed his duties in football. Massoud claimed, "If Love's dual role as ARL chairman and solicitor – or RLIF director and World Cup organiser – doesn't sound conflict-of-interest alarm bells, his SCG Trusteeship should," in reference to Love's allocation of at least one World Cup game to the Sydney Football Stadium instead of Telstra Stadium. Daily Telegraph reporter Dean Ritchie later wrote, "Colin Love is today left with no option but to resign all official involvement with the 2008 World Cup." Ritchie summarised his view: "The public no longer tolerates the hollow cries of 'fair business', for instance, when a city councillor awards a rich contract to a company he owns shares in, and nor should it. Rugby league should be no different".
