= Te Mata Estate =

Winery in Hawke's Bay, New Zealand

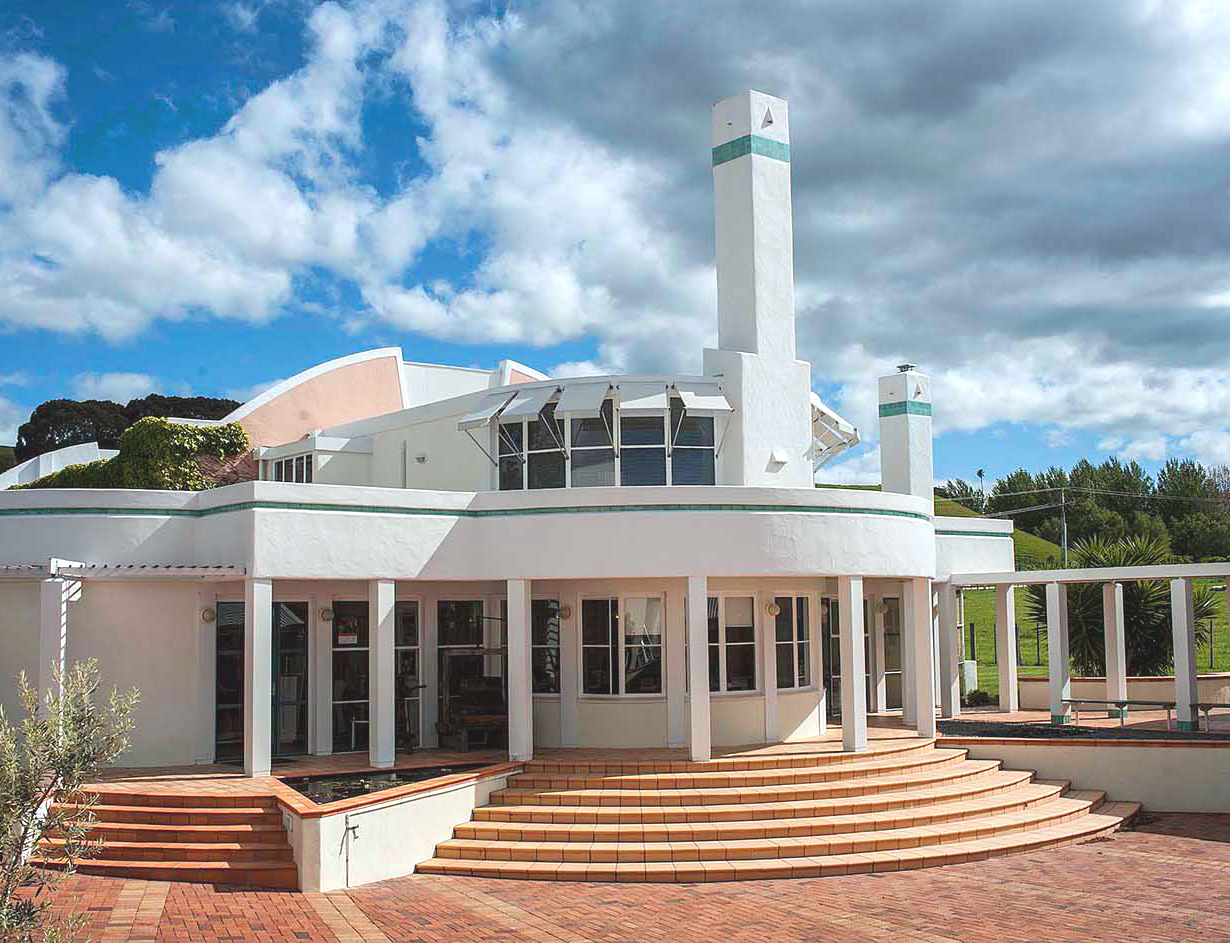
- Location: Havelock North, Hawke's Bay, New Zealand
- Coordinates: 39.6708429°S 176.9138673°E
- Wine region: Hawke's Bay
- Founded: 1896; 130 years ago
- Key people: John Buck CNZM OBE, Peter Cowley
- Cases/yr: 30,000
- Known for: Coleraine, Bullnose Syrah
- Varietals: Cabernet Sauvignon, Merlot, Syrah, Pinot Noir, Gamay Noir, Chardonnay, Sauvignon Blanc, Viognier
- Tasting: Open to the public
- Website: www.temata.co.nz

Te Mata Estate is an independent, family-owned Hawke's Bay winery and New Zealand's oldest winery on its original site and vineyard, in continuous operation since 1896. The winery produces everything on-premises at their Havelock Hills site near Havelock North, 15 kilometres (9.3 mi) south of Napier. Established in the late 19th century by the Chambers family, the winery and original vineyards were the first to be heritage-protected. Unlike other historic New Zealand wineries, Te Mata has operated continuously on the same land since its founding, and is widely regarded as one of New Zealand's most significant wine producers.

The winery and vineyards are run by the Buck family: John Buck CNZM OBE, a former chairman of the Wine Institute of New Zealand and member of the New Zealand Wine Hall of Fame, as well as his three sons Jonathan, Nick and Tobias. Te Mata's flagship Coleraine wine is regarded by many as New Zealand's finest red wine, and is named after the Buck family's ancestral hometown in Northern Ireland. Te Mata Estate relies on its long-term senior management staff, a permanent vineyard crew and a team of hand-pickers led by senior viticulturist Larry Morgan, and the winemaking team has been led for over 30 years by Technical Director Peter Cowley.

Te Mata Estate is especially notable because it has hand-harvested grapes from its own vineyards and produced, blended and labelled small-batch premium wines entirely on site in the original winery buildings since 1895. New Zealand's first legally protected wine-growing area, the Te Mata Special Character Zone in the Havelock Hills, was established by the Hawke's Bay Regional Council in 1996, recognized and conserved on the basis of its unique wine-growing heritage value.

== History ==
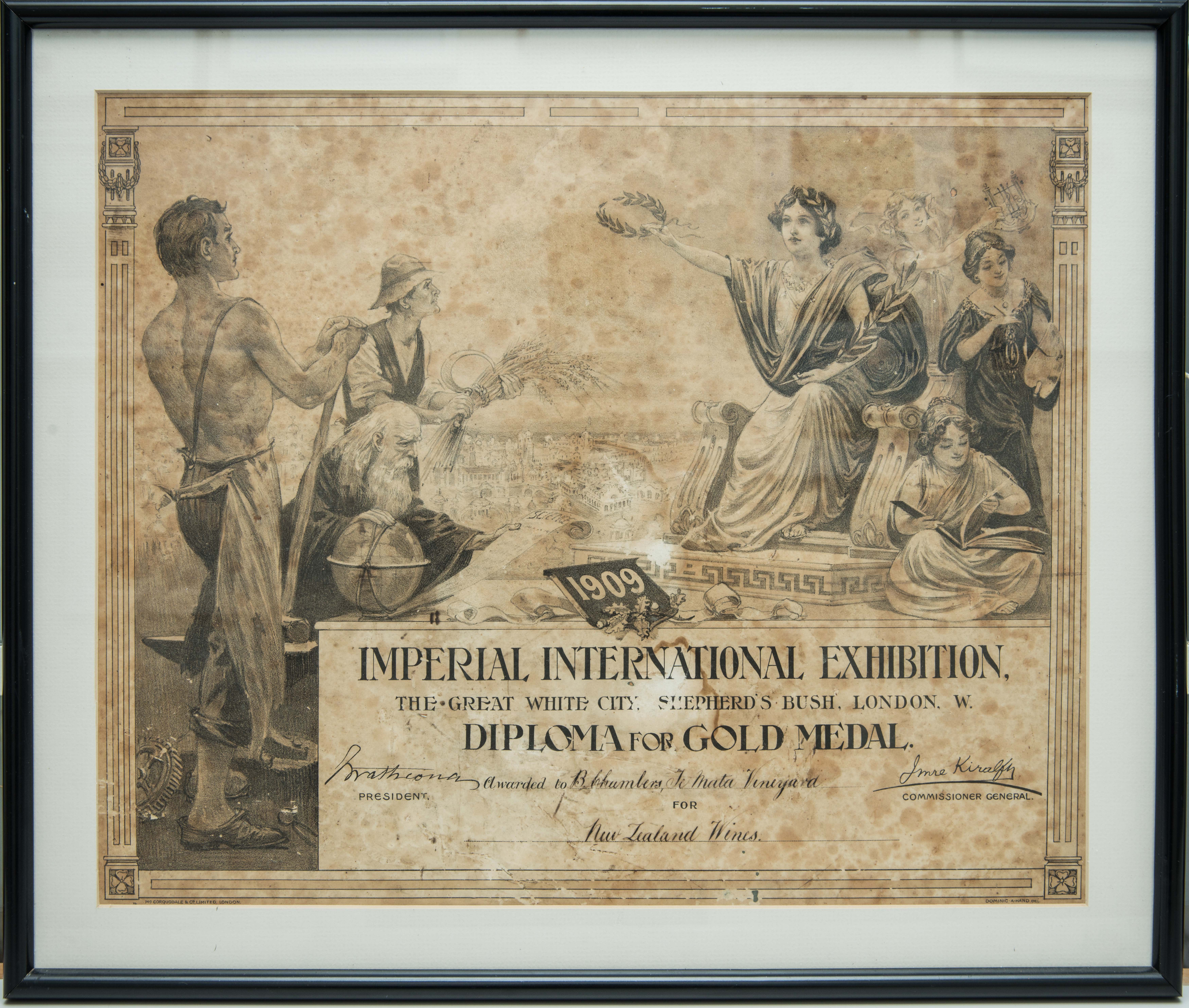
Te Mata won a Gold Medal for its cabernet in the Imperial International Exhibition in 1909

After returning from France in 1895, the winery and site was established by Bernard Chambers on Te Mata Station, a large area of farmland the Chambers' family had bought in 1854 from Ngāti Kahungunu. Three vineyards were planted in the 1890s with Cabernet, Chardonnay and Pinot and incorporated into this early development, including Eighteen92 on Te Mata Road and the Elston vineyard, which was the earliest Chardonnay planting in New Zealand. These sites extend across the elevated, north-facing slopes of the Havelock Hills at the foot of Te Mata Peak and are all still in use today.

With the help of the Marist brotherhood, and the Beecham family in Central Hawke's Bay, the early vineyards were recognized for their export quality by the government viticulturist Romeo Bragato in 1905. Since then Te Mata wines have been available and won praise in Europe, including a Gold Medal at the Imperial International Exhibition in 1909. In the early twentieth century Te Mata was New Zealand's largest wine producer.

The main cellar was built in the 1870s from local hand-fired brick with a mataī and rimu roofing, and extended to add a first-year barrel hall in the 1930s. In 1919 the Chambers family sold the property and Te Mata Vineyards was established. The Buck and Morris families bought the winery in 1974 and began significant modernization and development.

=== Modern history ===
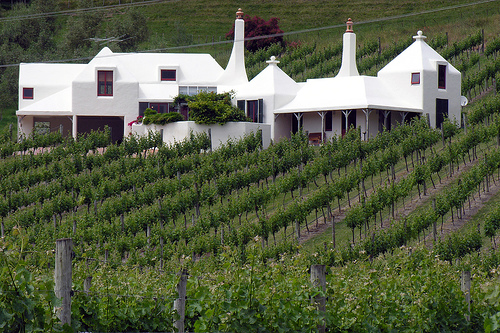
The Buck family home, Coleraine Vineyard, across the road from Te Mata Estate.

Under the direction of the Buck and Morris families the Te Mata Estate winery complex was modernized and extended in the 1980s by New Zealand architect Sir Ian Athfield. An underground barrel hall, cuverie and office buildings were added in the region's prominent Art Deco and Spanish Mission architecture as deliberate influences. Opposite the winery, the distinctive Coleraine House is a private residence that has gained much recognition as a significant work of New Zealand architecture. In 1997 it appeared on the 80c postage stamp in a series celebrating New Zealand wines.

In addition to the original north-facing vineyards covering 15 hectares (37 acres) in the Havelock Hills surrounding the winery, Te Mata established in the early 1990s the Woodthorpe vineyard covering 75 hectares (190 acres) to the northeast of Havelock North, and two vineyards in the Bridge Pa Triangle west of Hastings, each covering 15 hectares. Since 2001, only half of the fruit grown on these vineyards is made under the Te Mata label.

While Cabernet Sauvignon, Chardonnay and Pinot Noir have all been planted in Te Mata vineyards since 1892, in 1994 Te Mata Estate introduced Viognier to New Zealand, followed by Gamay Noir, and the second-oldest planting of Syrah in the country.

Te Mata Estate was responsible for founding the New Zealand Poet Laureate award in 1994, with the title in its first decade being the “Te Mata Estate Poet Laureate”. The position is now administered by the National Library of New Zealand. Each New Zealand Poet Laureate still receives support from Te Mata Estate and is inaugurated near the winery at Matahiwi Marae. The first five Poets Laureate received a tokotoko, carved from Te Mata's original wine press by Hawke's Bay artist and sculptor Jacob Scott.

== Production ==
The Hawke's Bay wine growing region has a wide diversity of soil types and a climate similar to Bordeaux, with dry sunny summers and long autumns. The proximity of the Pacific Ocean makes the region maritime and temperate with a natural rain shadow which can keep soils particularly dry during ripening season. The Te Mata vineyards are on free-draining, silt loam soils, and at Bridge Pa a mixture of red metal soils over river gravel.

In a typical year Te Mata Estate produces 30,000 cases of wine, most of which is sold internationally. Due to production size and reputation their top wines often sell out quickly, with the 2013 Coleraine selling out in 10 days. The use of multiple vineyard sites across Hawke's Bay is crucial to their winemaking style, allowing them to 'parcel-develop' small blocks that reflect differences in aspect, climate and soil type from within the region.

Te Mata Estate is regarded as New Zealand's finest producer of Cabernet Sauvignon and Merlot blends, and produces a variety of other well-known wines including the Bullnose Syrah from the Bridge Pa Triangle, Awatea Cabernets/Merlot blend, Estate Vineyards Gamay Noir, the Zara Viognier, the Elston Chardonnay and Cape Crest Sauvignon Blanc – a barrel-fermented sauvignon blend similar in style to a Graves region, or southern Bordeaux white wine.

== Recognition ==
Described as 'a national treasure' by jancisrobinson.com in 2018, Robert Parkers' Wine Advocate listed Te Mata Estate as one of the 5 Icon wineries of New Zealand, awarding it the classification of “Outstanding Producer”. Both Te Mata Estate Coleraine and Te Mata Estate Bullnose Syrah have been listed by James Suckling in the Top 50 Wines of the World. The 1998 Te Mata Coleraine was profiled as a “Wine Legend” by Decanter Magazine in 2017, the only New Zealand wine to have done so.

New Zealand's Cuisine Wine Magazine wrote of Te Mata Estate:

"If there were a Kiwi wine aristocracy, Te Mata would be part of it. [...] they make some of the best wines in the country".

Te Mata Estate wines are available in 45 countries, including China, UAE and the United States. They have been served at Noma in Copenhagen, Raffles in Singapore, and the Burj Al Arab in Dubai, and are available in London in Harrods, and in Hong Kong and Japan through Berry Bros & Rudd. They have been presented at the Diamond Jubilee of Queen Elizabeth II, as gifts by New Zealand Prime Ministers to Queen Elizabeth II, Chinese President Xi Jinping and served at an exclusive dinner in 2018 to former US President Barack Obama.

In their 2016 article on Te Mata Estate, Decanter Magazine described Te Mata Estate as “New Zealand's First Growth” with Coleraine “among the top Bordeaux blends in the world.” Michael Cooper lists the Coleraine, Awatea, Bullnose Syrah, and Elston Chardonnay in his highest category, “Super Classic”. In 2016 the barrel fermented Cape Crest Sauvingnon Blanc received 90+ points and was named “one of the world's best barrel-fermented sauvignon blancs” by Australian wine critic Lester Jesberg.

Chairman John Buck and Technical Director Peter Cowley have an extensive history as critics and judges of wine competitions. Today, with a boutique production schedule and wines created to develop over many years, Te Mata seldom enters wines in competition – though there have been exceptions. In 1991 the International Wine Challenge awarded the 1989 Elston Chardonnay the trophy for 'Best White Wine in Show'.

Only a limited amount of Coleraine is available from each vintage. It is released on March 1 and sells out very quickly, usually within a few days. In 2016 a thirty-year vertical collection of Coleraine sold at auction for over $5,000 NZD. It is the first time any collection of aged New Zealand wine has been sold in this way.
