= Babits =

Babits is a surname. Notable people with the surname include:

- Laslo Babits (1958–2013), Canadian javelin thrower
- Lawrence Babits (born 1943), American archaeologist
- Mihály Babits (1883–1941), Hungarian poet, writer, and translator
