= Lavra Babič =

Slovenian swimmer

Personal information
- Full name: Lavra Babič
- Nationality: Slovenia
- Born: 1 January 1987 (age 39) Brezje, Slovenia, Yugoslavia
- Height: 1.70 m (5 ft 7 in)
- Weight: 57 kg (126 lb)

Sport
- Sport: Swimming
- Strokes: Freestyle
- Club: Plavalni Klub Radovljica

Lavra Babič (born 1 January 1987 in Brezje) is a freestyle swimmer from Slovenia, who participated for her native country at the 2004 Summer Olympics in Athens, Greece.
