= Shirley Warren (politician) =

New Zealand local politician and community leader (1940–2024)

Shirley Warren QSM
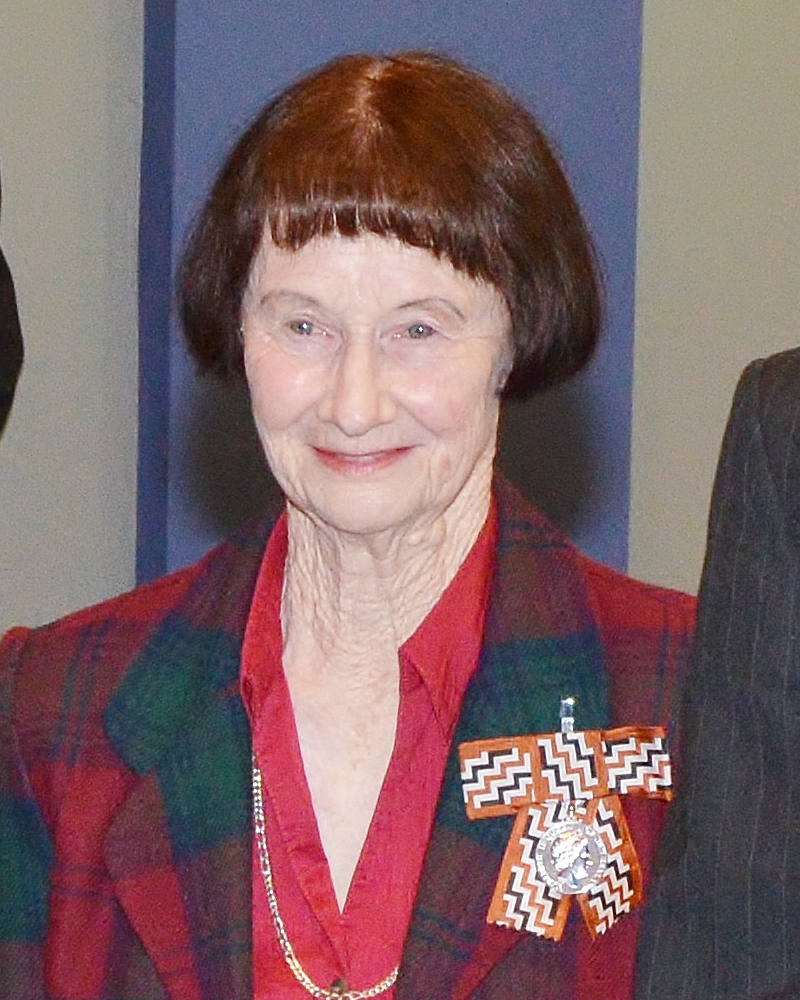
- Warren in 2015
- Born: Shirley Elizabeth Sinton; 25 April 1940; Mount Albert, New Zealand
- Died: 9 August 2024 (aged 84); Auckland. New Zealand
- Known for: community leader
- Spouse: Ross Warren

Shirley Elizabeth Warren QSM (née Sinton; 25 April 1940 – 8 May 2024) was a New Zealand local-body politician and community leader. She established a women's refuge and was involved in the campaign to prevent the development of Musick Point in Auckland.

== Early life and family ==
Warren was born Shirley Elizabeth Sinton on 25 April 1940, the daughter of Eunice and Duke Sinton, at Glamis Obstetric Hospital in the Auckland suburb of Mount Albert. She was married to Ross Warren for 60 years, and the couple had three daughters.

== Career ==
Warren established a women's refuge with her husband, for which she was awarded the New Zealand Suffrage Centennial Medal in 1993. As a conservationist, she is credited for helping save Musick Point in Bucklands Beach from development after the land was privatised when Telecom was sold by the government. After a public campaign, the land was returned to public ownership, and Warren was the inaugural chair of the Musick Point Trust, established in 1992. Warren was also the founding president of the Tamaki Playcentre Association.

Warren was chair of the Bucklands and Eastern Beaches Residents and Ratepayers' Association for 25 years. Other roles she held included serving on the Pakuranga Community Board from 2007 to 2010 and the Howick Local Board from 2010 to 2013.

In the 2015 New Year Honours, Warren was awarded the Queen's Service Medal, for services to the community, alongside her husband.

== Death ==
Warren died on 8 May 2024, at the age of 84. Her husband, Ross Warren, died on 26 February 2025.
