= Jo Seagar =

New Zealand writer, TV personality and celebrity cook

Jo Seagar MNZM
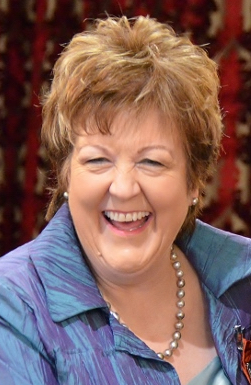
- Seagar in 2015, during her investiture as a Member of the New Zealand Order of Merit
- Born: 1955 (age 70–71); Christchurch, New Zealand
- Education: Le Cordon Bleu
- Writing career
- Subjects: Cooking and food

Joanna Mary Seagar (born 1955), generally known as Jo Seagar, is a New Zealand writer, TV personality and celebrity cook.

== Biography ==
Seagar lives in the small town of Oxford in North Canterbury, with her husband Ross. She initially trained as a nurse, and attended Le Cordon Bleu cookery school in London while working at the Royal Free Hospital. Back in New Zealand, Seagar opened Harley's Restaurant in Auckland with fellow nurse Helen Brabazon. Seagar ran "Seagars at Oxford" cooking school, café and kitchenware store for about ten years, but it closed in 2015. Seager cited the decrease in tourism following the Canterbury earthquakes as the reason for its closure. The company's collapse left thousands of dollars unpaid to employees and creditors.

Seagar was the first food writer for North & South, has written for New Zealand Woman's Weekly and Cuisine magazine, and writes a regular column for the Australian Women's Weekly.

Seagar is patron and ambassador for Hospice, and raises money for the charity through cooking classes. In the 2015 New Year Honours, Seagar was appointed a Member of the New Zealand Order of Merit, for services to the community.

== Books ==
- Jo Seagar's New Zealand Country Cookbook (1993)
- Pearls from Jo Seagar's Kitchen (1999)
- Easy Peasy Lemon Squeezy (2001)
- Sugar and Spice: A Taste of Chelsea (2002)
- Lip Smackin' Fast Cookin' Hunger Bustin' Gr8 Tastin' Cookbook (2003)
- Easy Peasy Very Cheesy (2004)
- The Chelsea Cafe: The Simple, Tasty Cafe Food at Home (2005)
- You Shouldn't Have Gone to So Much Trouble, Darling (2007)
- All Things Nice (2002)
- Jo Seagar Cooks (2006)
- The Cook School Recipes (2008)
- Everyday Cooking: Easy, Simple Recipes for Everyone (2010)
- Italia: Simple Recipes from the Italian Cook School (2011)
- Great Baking Recipes (2013)
- A Bit of What You Fancy (2013)
- Easy Finger Food Recipes (2014)
- Jo Seagar Bakes (2014)
- Elbows off the Table, Please (2016)
- Better than a Bought One: Clever Recipes and Ideas for Home-Grown Celebrations (2018)
