= Ted Manson =

New Zealand property developer and philanthropist

Sir Ted Manson KNZM
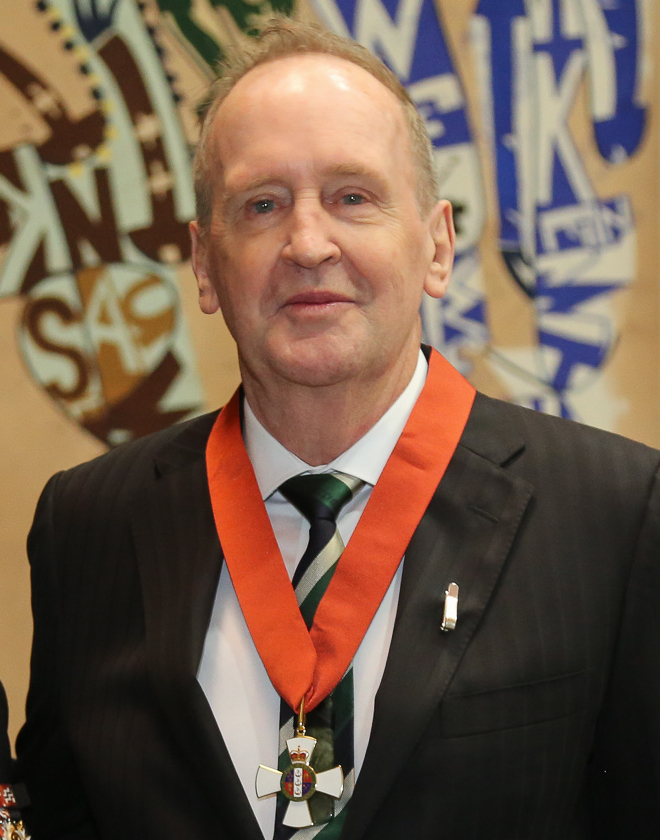
- Manson in 2022
- Born: Edward Colin Manson; 1954 (age 70–71); Ōtāhuhu, New Zealand
- Occupations: Property developer; philanthropist

Sir Edward Colin Manson KNZM (born 1954) is a New Zealand businessman and philanthropist.

== Early life and family ==
Manson was born in Ōtāhuhu in 1954, the son of Rae and Colin Manson. He grew up in a state house in the Auckland suburb of Ōrākei, and was educated at Selwyn College. He went on to study valuation at the University of Auckland.

== Property development ==
In 1975, Manson and his father, Colin, founded a company buying and renovating houses for sale or rent. In the 1980s, the company was buying and selling an average of one house a day, and by the mid-1980s it owned 640 rental homes. In the 1990s, the Mansons moved into the conversion of office buildings into apartments in Auckland, as well as large-scale commercial development. Colin Manson died in 1998.

In 2006, Manson was joined in the family firm by his three sons, Culum, Luke and Mac, and the company became Mansons TCLM Limited. The business has since constructed more than 400 homes and 600,000 square metres (6,500,000 sq ft) of commercial office space in Auckland, and is the largest private property development company in New Zealand.

In 2024, the Manson family's net worth was estimated at NZ$1.1 billion.

== Philanthropy ==
In 2014, Manson established the Ted Manson Foundation, a charitable trust to improve educational outcomes and housing quality in disadvantaged communities. The trust funds social housing developments, provides vans to low-decile schools, and makes donations to other bodies including the Auckland City Mission, Hato Hone St John and the Auckland Rescue Helicopter Trust. Other programmes include the targeted provision of teaching resources for new-entrant classes and school counselling and wellbeing services.

== Honours and awards ==
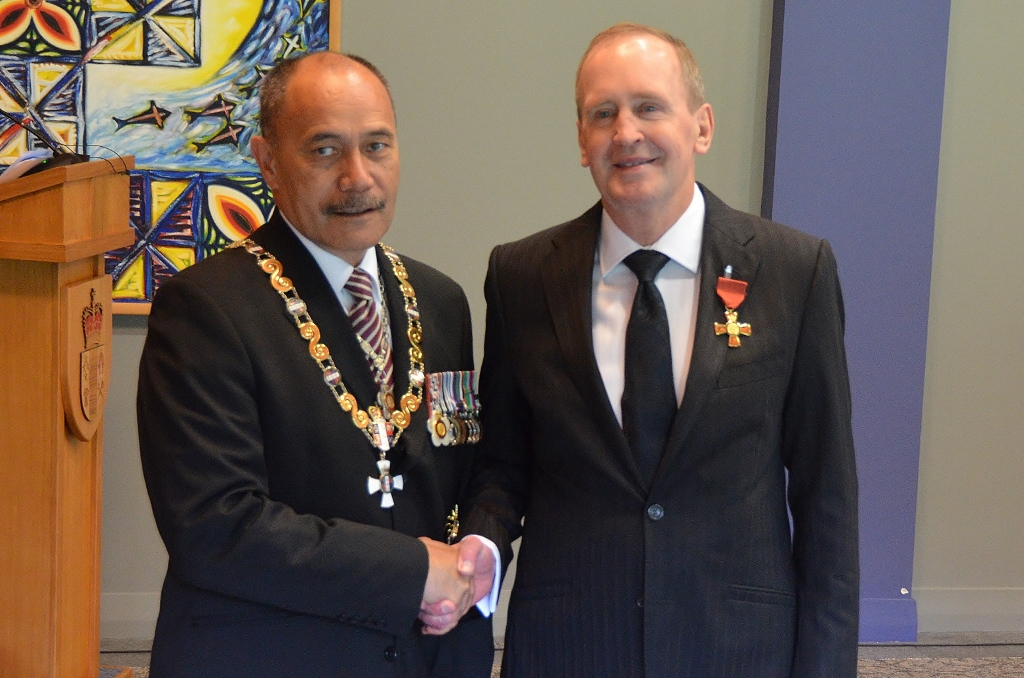
Manson (right), after his investiture as an Officer of the New Zealand Order of Merit by the governor-general, Sir Jerry Mateparae, at Government House, Auckland, on 7 May 2015

In the 2015 New Year Honours, Manson was appointed an Officer of the New Zealand Order of Merit, for services to urban redevelopment. He was promoted to Companion of the New Zealand Order of Merit, for services to philanthropy, urban development and business, in the 2022 Queen's Birthday and Platinum Jubilee Honours, and further promoted to Knight Companion of the New Zealand Order of Merit, for services to philanthropy, the community and business, in the 2025 New Year Honours.

In 2023, Manson was inducted into the New Zealand Business Hall of Fame, in recognition of his contributions to property development and social equity.
