= John Buck (winemaker) =

New Zealand winemaker

John Buck CNZM OBE
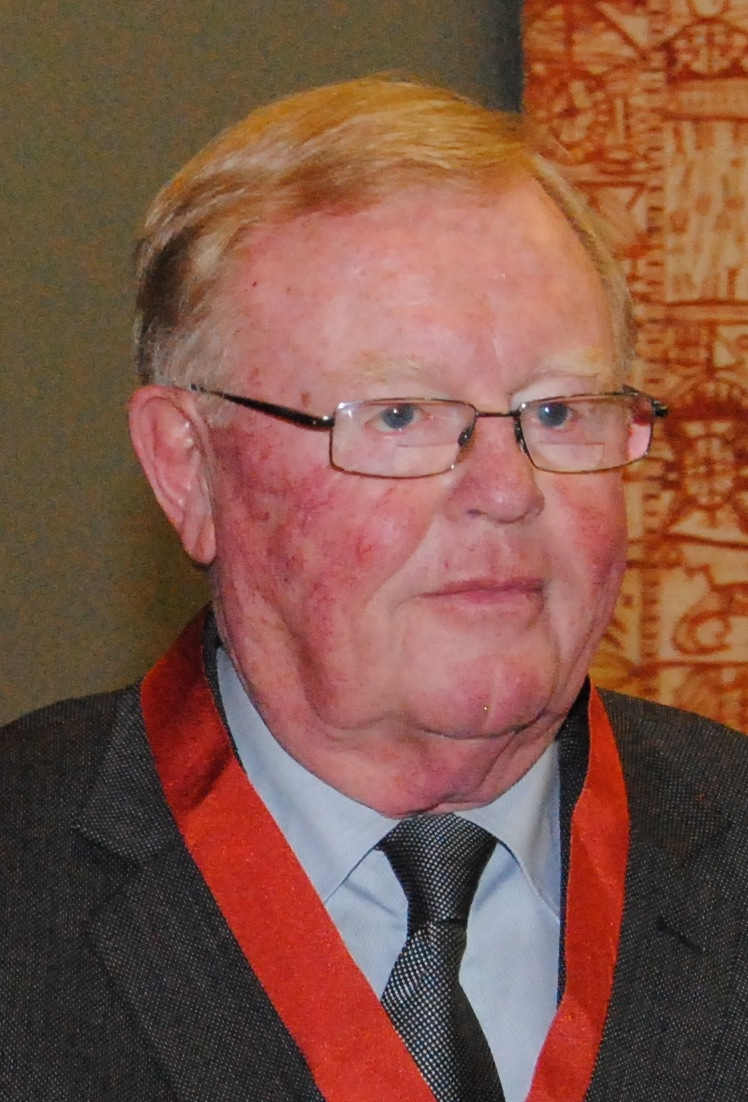
- Buck in 2013
- Occupation: Chairman of Te Mata Estate
- Known for: Establishing premium wine in New Zealand
- Spouses: Wendy Buck

John Kenneth Buck CNZM OBE is chairman of Te Mata Estate winery and is widely recognised for his contributions to fine wine and the New Zealand wine industry.

== Career ==
Buck was involved in wine judging in New Zealand and Australia for many years, beginning in 1969 after he published a book on the subject called Take a Little Wine. In 1979, he became chairman of judges for the national wine show. He was the first New Zealander to hold this position.

Buck was also chairman of the board of the Hawke's Bay Opera House and the patron of Cranford Hospice. In 1991, he founded the Hawke's Bay charity wine auction, and has been previously chairman of Hawkes Bay Vintners, which he helped establish. From 1991 to 1996, he served as chairman of the New Zealand Wine Institute. He has represented the wine industry at international trade negotiations, gaining access to the European Union, and had a regular wine series on Radio New Zealand, as well as fronting documentaries for the same network in the Spectrum series.

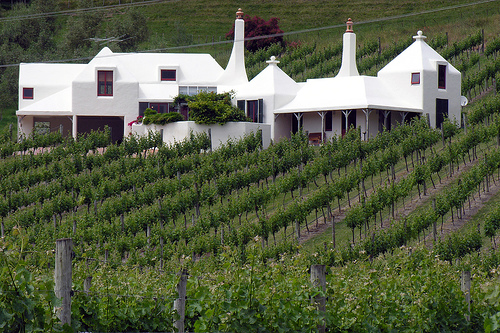
Coleraine House, also known as "Buck House", designed by architect Ian Athfield

Since 1974, Buck and his wife Wendy have managed New Zealand's oldest winery, Te Mata Estate. They live in the Coleraine Vineyard opposite the winery, have three sons who work at Te Mata—Jonathan, Nick and Tobias Buck—and six grandchildren. Coleraine, the red wine made from the Buck family vineyard, has repeatedly been named New Zealand's greatest red wine, and has achieved many accolades in New Zealand and internationally.

== Recognition ==
Buck has earned many awards over the years for his leadership in wine and the arts. He was awarded the New Zealand 1990 Commemoration Medal in 1990, and appointed an Officer of the Order of the British Empire, for services to the wine industry, in the 1995 Queen's Birthday Honours. He was made a fellow of the Wine Institute of New Zealand in 2000, and awarded an honorary doctorate by Lincoln University in 2001.

In 2012, Buck was inducted into the New Zealand Wine Hall of Fame. In the 2013 New Year Honours, Buck was appointed a Companion of the New Zealand Order of Merit for services to the wine industry and the arts. He was also one of only 150 attendees at the International Wine Trade Dinner at London's Vintners' Hall in 2013, held by the Worshipful Company of Vintners in celebration of the 650th anniversary of the Company's first Royal Charter.
