= Babych =

Babych is a surname. Notable people with the surname include:

- Dave Babych (born 1961), Canadian ice hockey player
- Nadiya Babych (1943–2021), Ukrainian linguist
- Oleksandr Babych (born 1979), Ukrainian footballer
- Wayne Babych (born 1958), Canadian ice hockey player

== See also ==
- Babich, alternative transliteration
