= 2015 New Year Honours (New Zealand) =

Annual awards for New Zealanders

- Previous: 2014 New Zealand gallantry awards Next: 2015 Queen's Birthday Honours
- Type: New Zealand royal honours: New Zealand Order of Merit; Queen's Service Order; Queen's Service Medal; New Zealand Antarctic Medal; New Zealand Distinguished Service Decoration; New Zealand Bravery Medal
- Date: 31 December 2014
- Country: New Zealand
- Total recipients: 184

The 2015 New Year Honours in New Zealand were appointments by Elizabeth II in her right as Queen of New Zealand, on the advice of the New Zealand government, to various orders and honours to reward and highlight good works by New Zealanders, and to celebrate the passing of 2014 and the beginning of 2015. They were announced on 31 December 2014.

The recipients of honours are displayed here as they were styled before their new honour.

== New Zealand Order of Merit ==
=== Knight Grand Companion (GNZM) ===
- Murray Frederick Brennan – of New York, United States of America. For services to medicine.
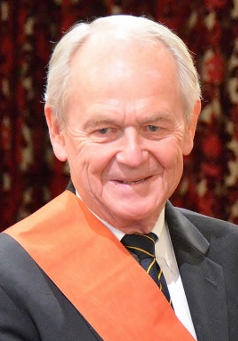
Sir Murray Brennan

=== Dame Companion (DNZM) ===
- Ellen Adrienne, Lady Stewart ONZM QSM – of Christchurch. For services to the arts and business.
- The Honourable Tariana Turia – of Whanganui. For services as a member of Parliament.
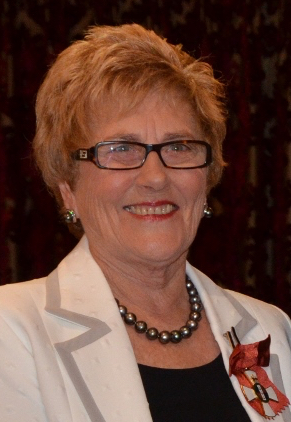
Dame Adrienne Stewart

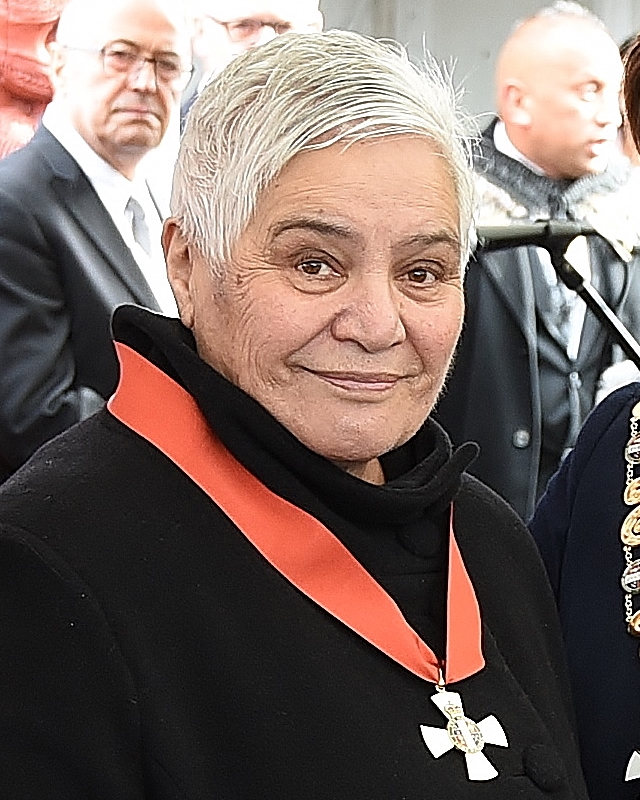
Dame Tariana Turia

=== Knight Companion (KNZM) ===
- Ian Charles Athfield CNZM – of Wellington. For services to architecture.
- Paul David Collins – of Martinborough. For services to sports governance.
- Neville Jordan CNZM – of Lower Hutt. For services to business, science and the community.
- Brother Patrick Joseph Lynch QSO – of Wellington. For services to education.
- The Honourable Graham Ken Panckhurst QC – of Christchurch. For services to the judiciary.
- Donald David Rowlands CBE – of Auckland. For services to business and rowing.
- Peter Aldridge Williams QC – of Auckland. For services to the law.
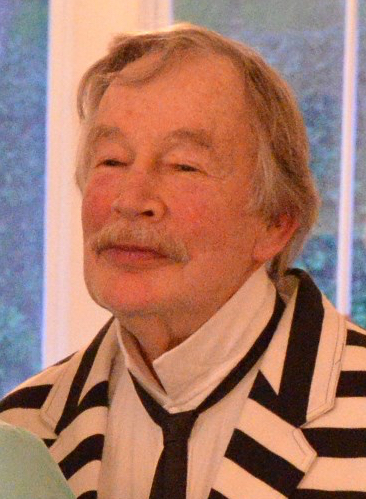
Sir Ian Athfield

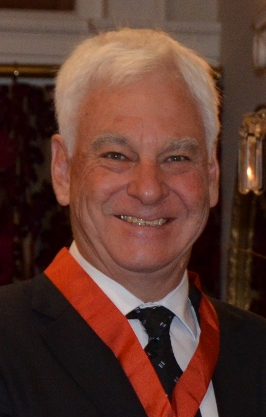
Sir Paul Collins

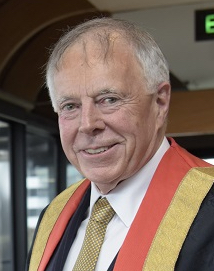
Sir Neville Jordan

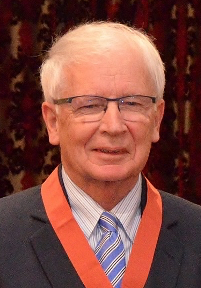
Sir Patrick Lynch

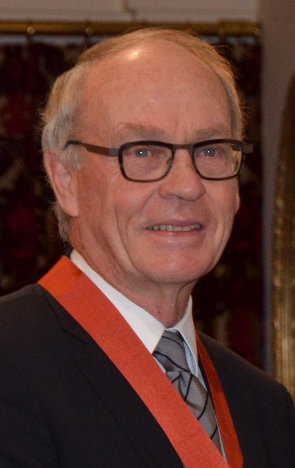
Sir Graham Panckhurst

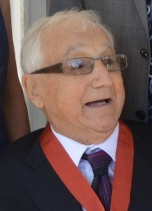
Sir Peter Williams

=== Companion (CNZM) ===
- Paul Hunter Adams – of Tauranga. For services to business and philanthropy.
- Professor Emeritus John Talbot Boys – of Auckland. For services to science.
- Robert Laurence Cameron – of Wellington. For services to business.
- Michael Jonathan Chunn ONZM – of Auckland. For services to music and mental health awareness.
- Robin John Cooper – of Auckland. For services to Māori health.
- Theresa Gattung – of Auckland. For services to business and philanthropy.
- Dr Martin Douglas Heffernan – of Auckland. For services to the electricity industry.
- The Honourable Murray Stuart McCully MP – of Wellington. For services to foreign policy.
- Christopher John David Moller – of Lower Hutt. For services to business and sport.
- Beverley Jean Morris QSO – of Auckland. For services to early childhood education.
- The Honourable Anthony Boyd Williams Ryall – of Ōhope. For services as a member of Parliament.
- Emeritus Professor Patrick John Walsh – of Wellington. For services to tertiary education.
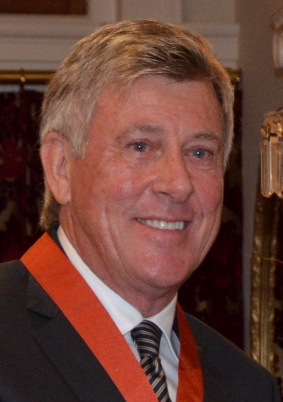
Paul Adams

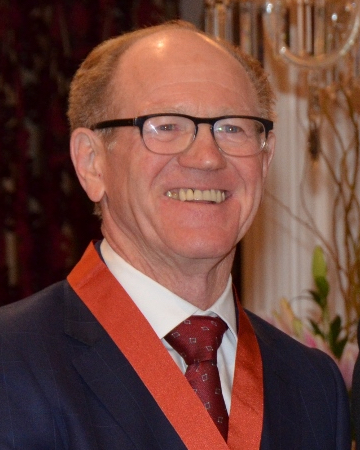
Rob Cameron

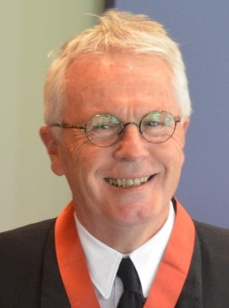
Mike Chunn

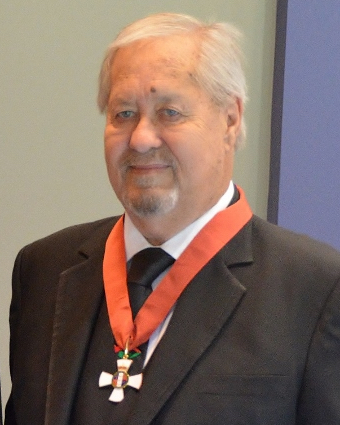
Rob Cooper

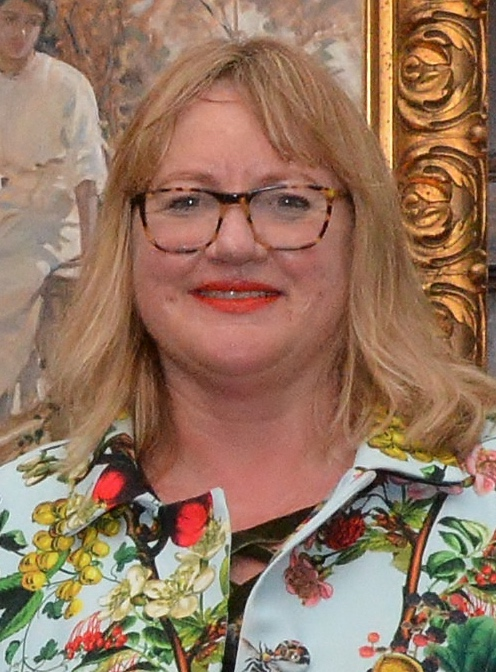
Theresa Gattung

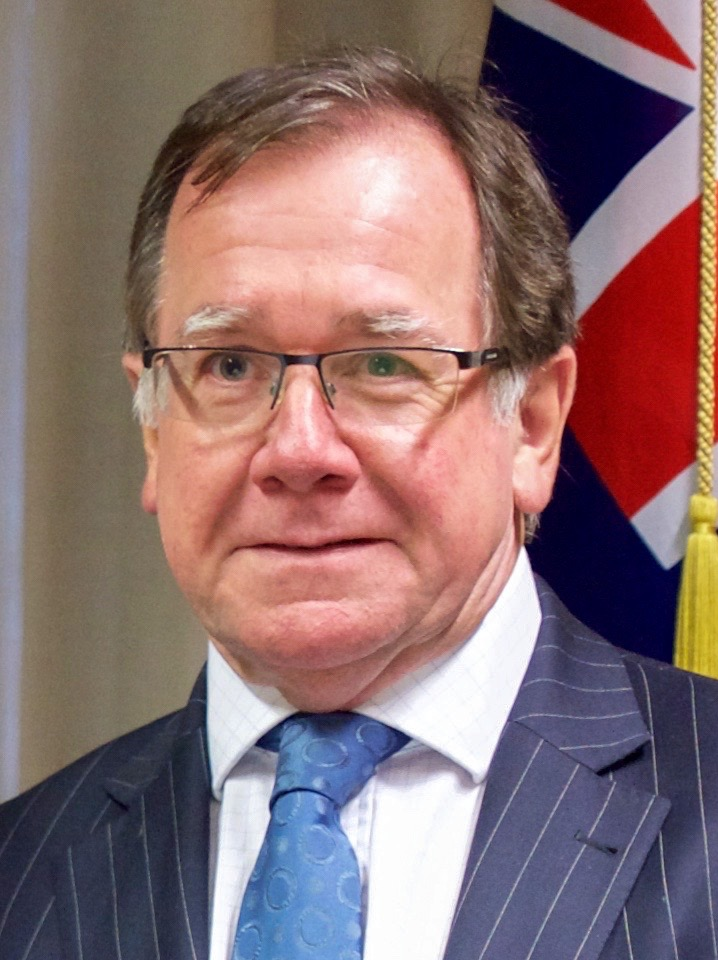
Murray McCully

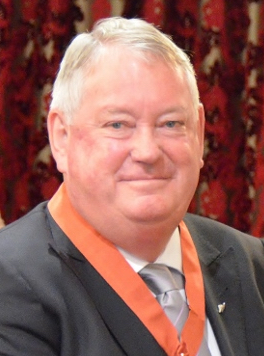
Chris Moller

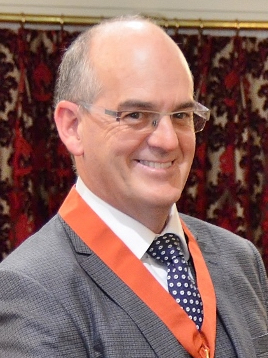
Tony Ryall

=== Officer (ONZM) ===
- Nona Aston – of Gisborne. For services to the community.
- Joseph Frank Babich – of Auckland. For services to the wine industry.
- Robyn Jane Baker – of Wellington. For services to education.
- Fleur Una Maude Beale – of Wellington. For services to literature.
- William Leslie John Begg – of Timaru. For services to speed skating.
- Annette Elizabeth Black – of Wellington. For services to legal education.
- Ross Trevor Blanks – of Christchurch. For services to animal welfare.
- James Boult – of Queenstown. For services to tourism and the community.
- Raelene Castle – of Sydney, Australia. For services to sport and business.
- Raymond Noel Cook – of Rotorua. For services to tourism and the community.
- Elizabeth Mary Evans JP – of Blenheim. For services to rural women.
- Lisa Harrow – of South Woodstock, United States of America. For services to the dramatic arts.
- Professor Emeritus Gary Leroy Hermansson – of Palmerston North. For services to the field of sport psychology.
- John Murray Hunn – of Wellington. For services to business and philanthropy.
- Inspector Anne-Frances Mary Jackson – of Rotorua. For services to the New Zealand Police and the community.
- Bryan Ewart Johnson – of Wellington. For services to business and philanthropy.
- Richard John Lucas – of Christchurch. For services to agriculture.
- Edward Colin Manson – of Auckland. For services to urban redevelopment.
- Gary Bevan Monk JP – of Auckland. For services to the seafood industry and the community.
- Dr Kevin Moran – of Auckland. For services to water safety.
- Susan Marie Paterson – of Auckland. For services to corporate governance.
- Dr Christopher John Pugsley – of Waikanae Beach. For services as a military historian.
- Dr Monty Glyn Soutar – of Gisborne. For services to Māori and historical research.
- Associate Professor Kathryn Mary Stowell – of Palmerston North. For services to biomedical science.
- Kukupa Tirikatene – of Auckland. For services to Māori and education.
- Superintendent David Edward Trappitt – of Wellington. For services to the New Zealand Police and the community.
- Colleen Elizabeth Urlich JP – of Dargaville. For services to Māori art.
- Janette Lawrence Wills – of Matamata. For services to the beef industry.
- Dr Sai Woh Wong – of Auckland. For services to mental health and the Chinese community.
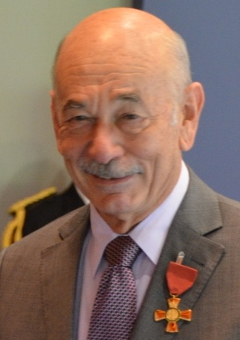
Joe Babich

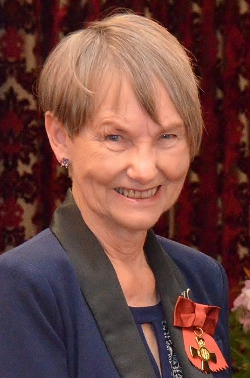
Fleur Beale

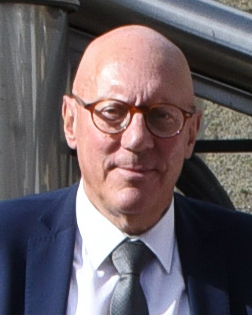
Jim Boult

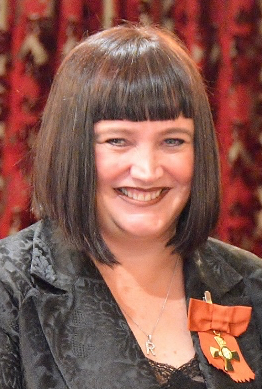
Raelene Castle

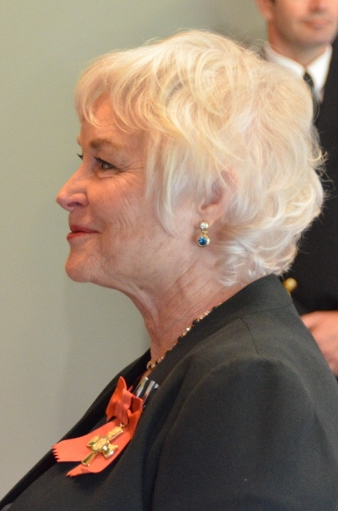
Lisa Harrow

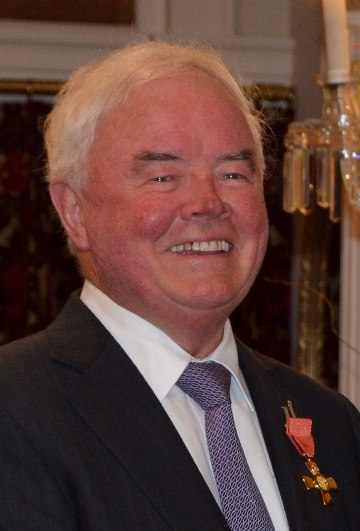
John Hunn

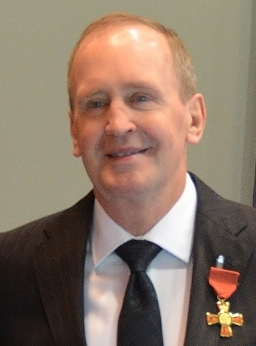
Ted Manson

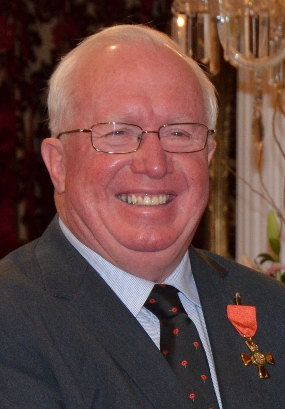
Christopher Pugsley

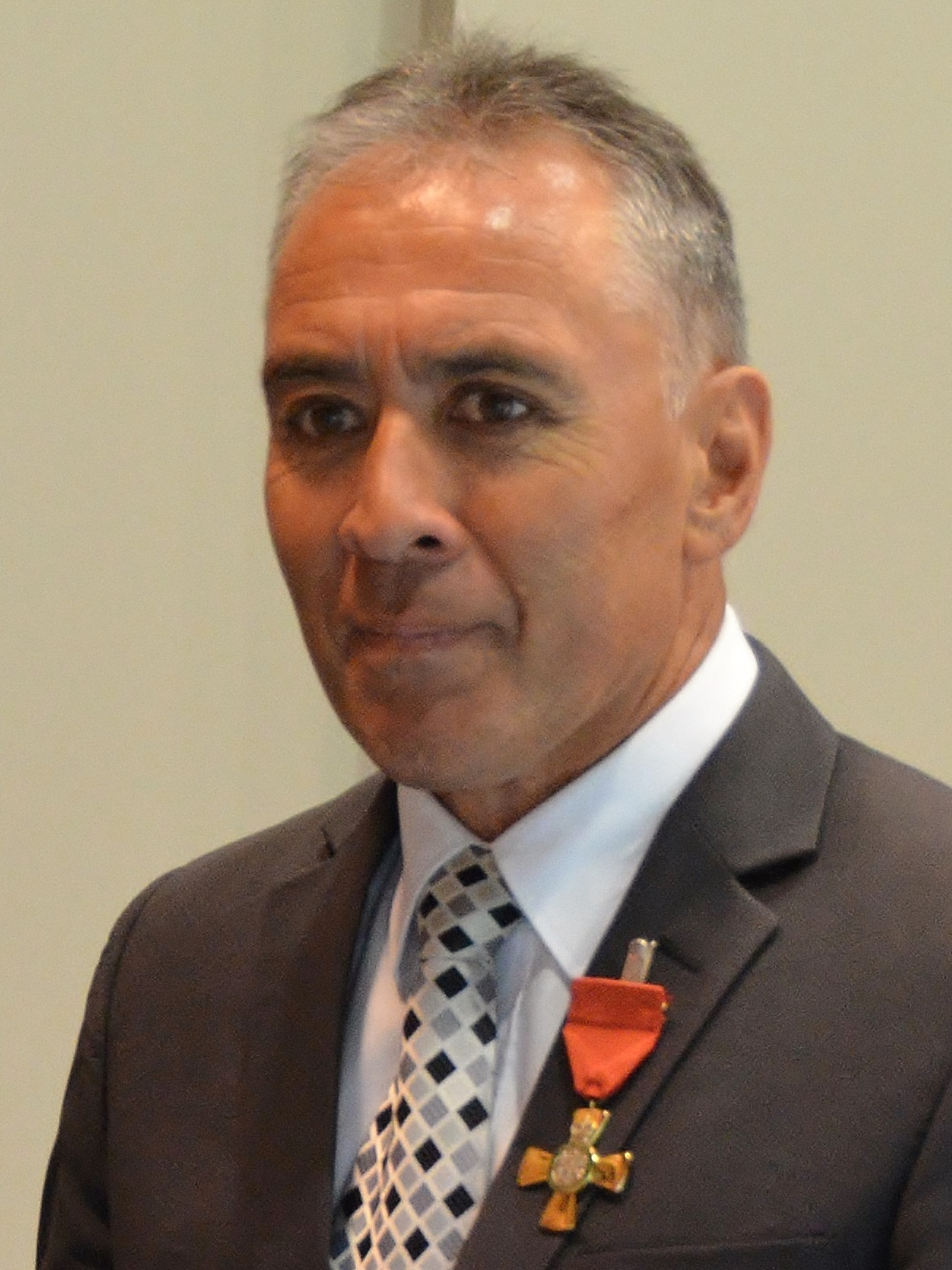
Monty Soutar

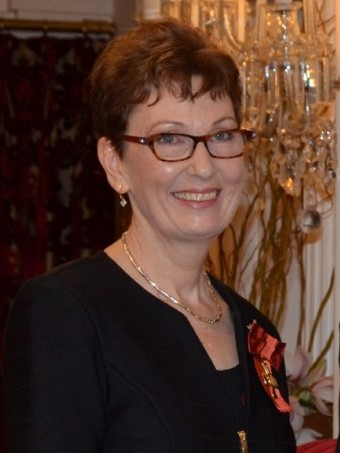
Kathryn Stowell

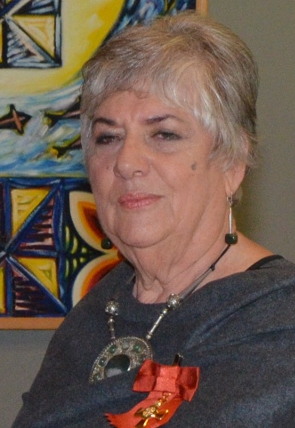
Colleen Urlich

=== Member (MNZM) ===
- Bruce Anstey – of Windsor, United Kingdom. For services to motorsport.
- Henry Walter Bell – of Motueka. For services to the mining industry.
- Alan Norman Bickers JP – of Tauranga. For services to the community.
- Robert Henry Bickerton – of Nelson. For services to music.
- Craig Alexander Elliott Brown JP – of Whangārei. For services to the community.
- Scott Jonathan Carter – of Auckland. For services to sport.
- Irene Mavis Cooper – of Hamilton. For services to education.
- William Robert Day JP – of Wellington. For services to health and the community.
- Simon Deng Li – of Auckland. For services to New Zealand–China relations and the arts.
- Gregory John Dickson – of Tauranga. For services to the cargo logistics industry.
- John Anthony Fallon – of Dunedin. For services to people with mental illnesses.
- Geraldene Barbara Glanville – of Auckland. For services to the blind community.
- Rosemary Gordon – of Wellington. For services to legal education.
- Reverend Dr Vincent Jonathan Hartfield – of Whanganui. For services to health.
- Dr Susan Jane Hickey – of Auckland. For services to people with disabilities.
- Roma Ruruku Hippolite – of Keilor, Australia. For services to Māori and health.
- Dr Susan Haas Jacobs – of Napier. For services to nursing education.
- Dr Elizabeth Anne Limbrick – of Auckland. For services to education.
- Phillippa Margaret Mahood – of Hamilton. For services to local government and the community.
- Victoria Manning – of Wellington. For services to the deaf and disabled communities.
- Iain Bruce McKay – of Bountiful, United States of America. For services to New Zealand–United States relations.
- Avenal Beryl Elizabeth McKinnon – of Wellington. For services to the arts.
- Professor Jens Helmut Friedrich Mueller – of Tauranga. For services to business and education.
- Sergeant William John Nicholson – of Palmerston North. For services to the New Zealand Police and Search and Rescue.
- Emmet Bede O'Sullivan – of Ashburton. For services to polo.
- Thomas McNeil Pryde – of Queenstown. For services to sport and the community.
- Penelope Jane Ridings – of Wellington. For services to the State.
- Barbara Anne Robson – of Feilding. For services to health.
- Joanna Mary Seagar – of Oxford. For services to the community.
- Janine Laurel Smith – of Auckland. For services to corporate governance.
- Jonathan Smith – of Auckland. For services to people with HIV/AIDS.
- Susannah Adair Staley – of Dunedin. For services to governance.
- Cecilia Sullivan-Grant – of Mosgiel. For services to the community.
- Ben Penita Taufua – of Auckland. For services to the Pacific community.
- Geraldine Barbara Leslie Travers – of Hastings. For services to education.
- Ivan Robert Vicelich – of Auckland. For services to football.
- Pele Walker – of Wellington. For services to the Pacific community.
- Patrick David Willock JP – of Gisborne. For services to agriculture and the community.
- Stewart Craig Wilson – of Auckland. For services to cricket.
- Blair Winton Wingfield – of Auckland. For services to health and sport.
- Thomas Neil Wolfe – of New Plymouth. For services to sport, education and the community.
- Stan Carl Wolfgramm – of Auckland. For services to the arts and Pacific community.

Honorary

- Marie Urbain Harold Michel Yow Koon Liu Man Hin – of Port Louis, Mauritius. For services to New Zealand–Mauritius relations.
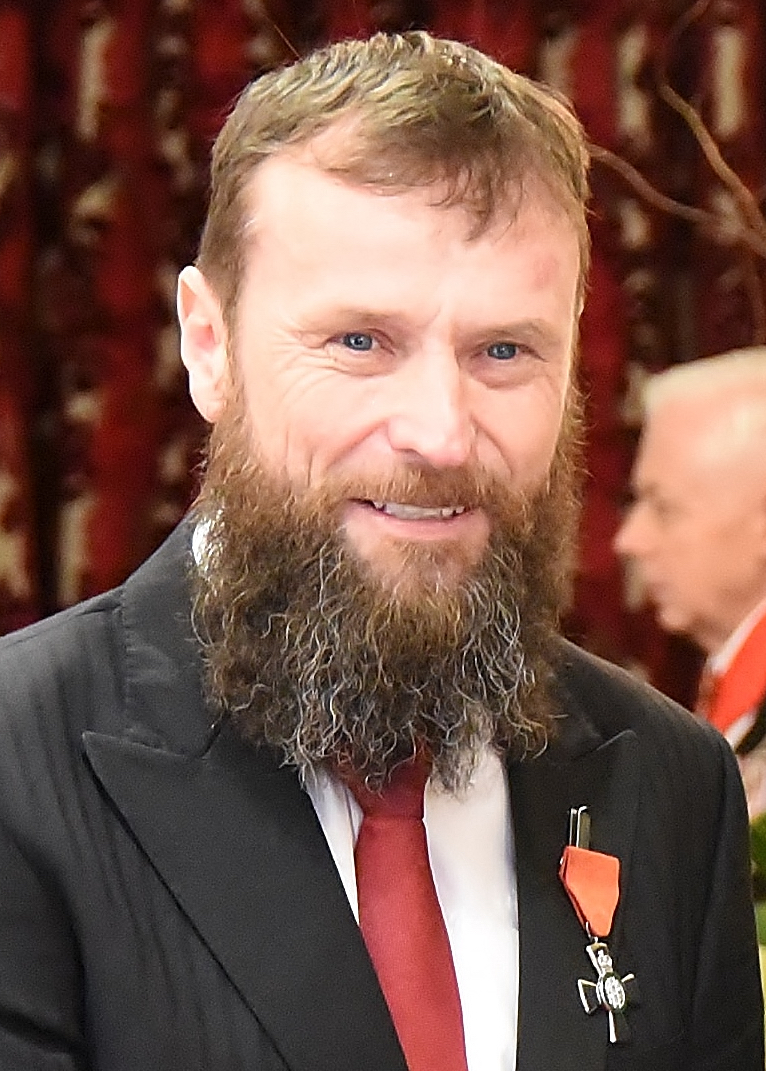
Bruce Anstey

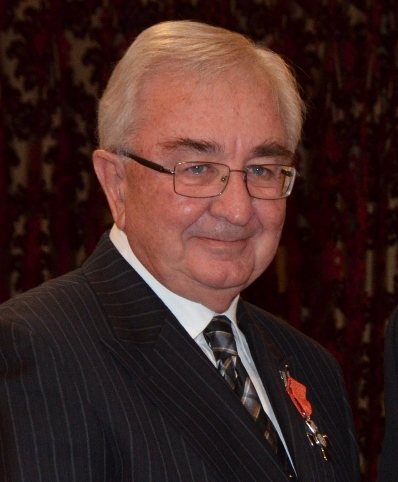
Alan Bickers

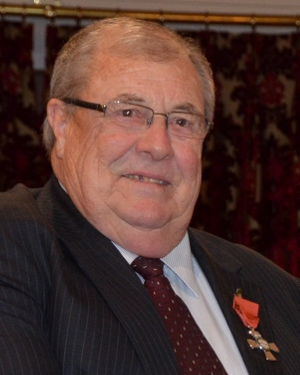
Craig Brown

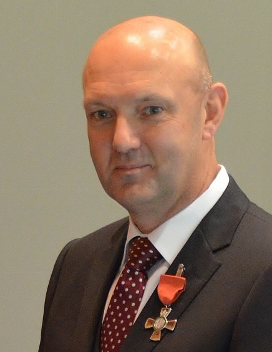
Scott Carter

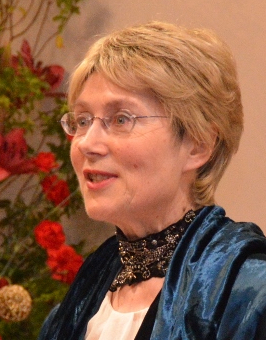
Avenal McKinnon

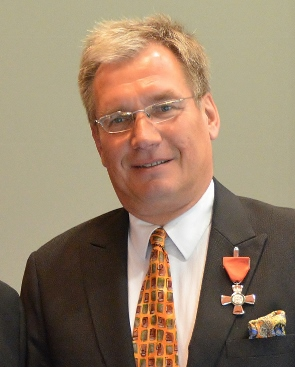
Jens Mueller

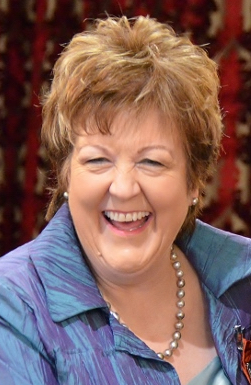
Jo Seagar

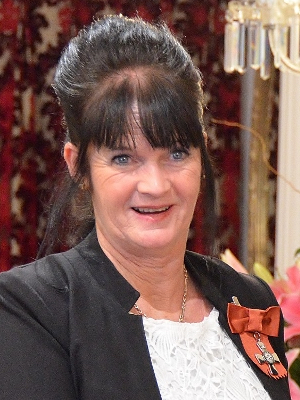
Cecilia Sullivan-Grant

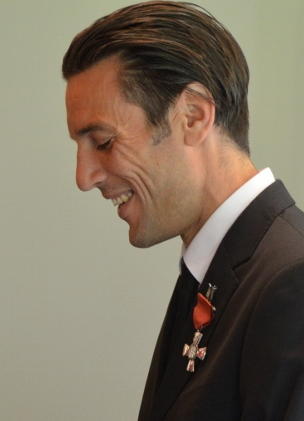
Ivan Vicelich

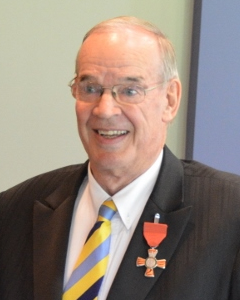
Blair Wingfield

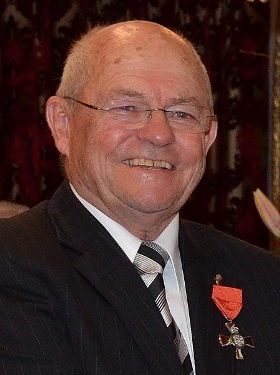
Neil Wolfe

== Companion of the Queen's Service Order (QSO) ==
- Adrian Peter Dance – of Roxburgh. For services to Land Search and Rescue.
- Judge Anthony David Ford – of Wellington. For services to Tonga and the judiciary.
- Brian Edward Hayes – of Wellington. For services to the land tenure system.
- Judge Bernard John Kendall – of Auckland. For services to the judiciary.
- Harold Valentine Ross Robertson – of Drury. For services as a member of Parliament.
- Eric Wilbur Roy JP – of Windsor. For services as a member of Parliament.
- Dr Warren Arthur Young – of Wellington. For services to the law.
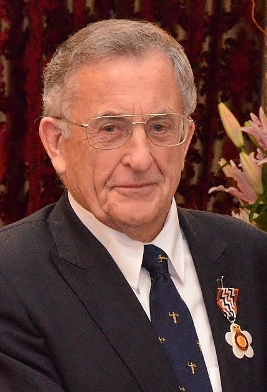
Tony Ford

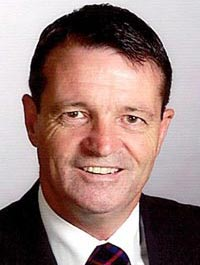
Ross Robertson

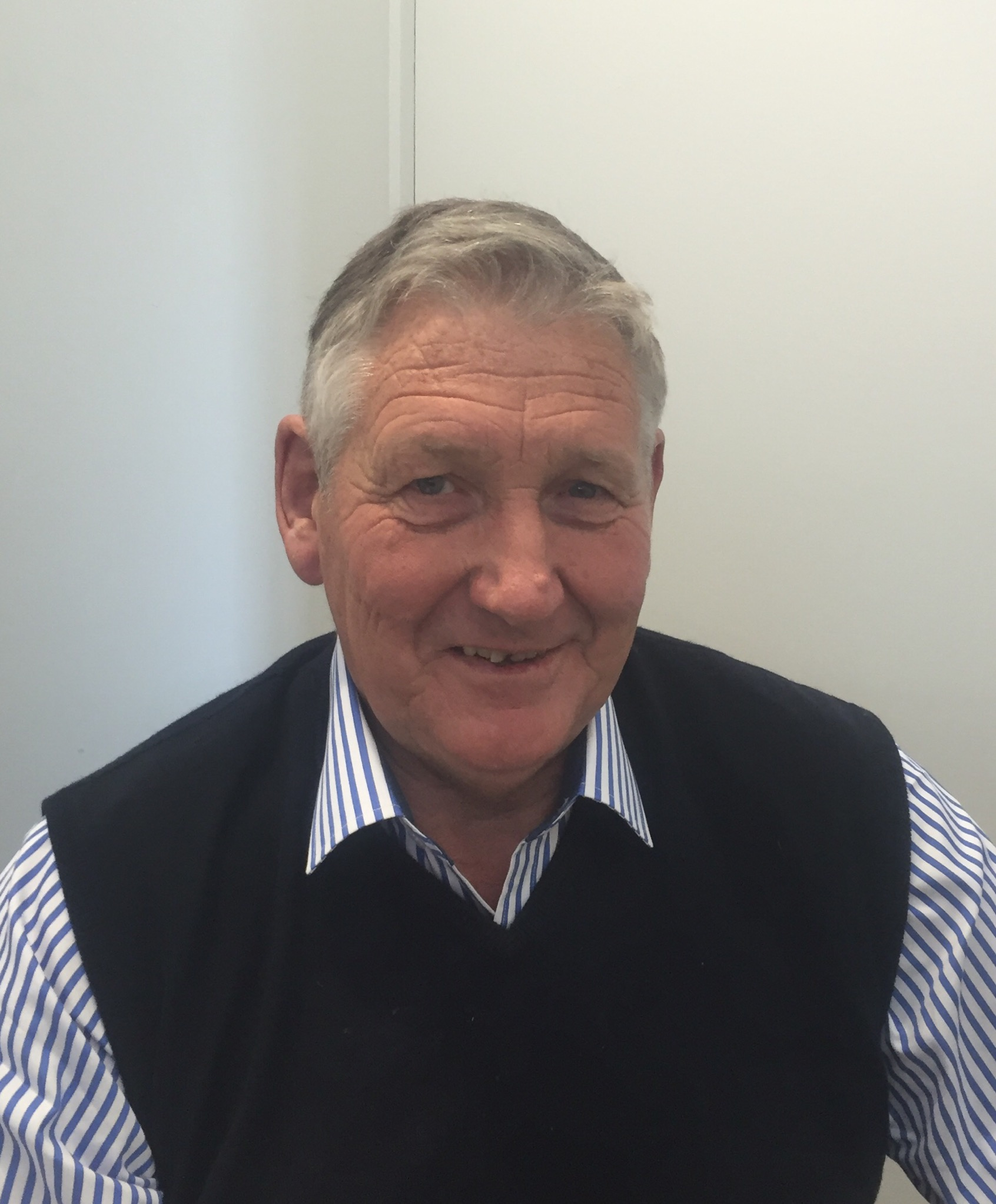
Eric Roy

== Queen's Service Medal (QSM) ==
- Hazel Askew – of Auckland. For services to the community.
- Alison Attwell – of Palmerston North. For services to the speech impaired.
- Thomas Howard Baker JP – of Kerikeri. For services to the community.
- Christopher Barfoot – of Auckland. For services to the environment and the community.
- Miriam Alvez Batucan – of Auckland. For services to the Filipino community.
- Oscar Pioquinto Batucan JP – of Auckland. For services to the Filipino community.
- Heather Flora Bongers – of Cambridge. For services to senior citizens.
- Joy Edna May Boniface – of Warkworth. For services to the community.
- Colin Clive Boyden – of Woodville. For services to the community.
- Geoffrey John Brann – of Te Puke. For services to forestry and the community.
- Gillian Margaret Brann – of Te Puke. For services to forestry and the community.
- Douglas Maxwell Lovelace Bull JP – of Whakatāne. For services to dairy farming and the community.
- Aroha Dawn Geraldine Campbell – of Rotorua. For services to Māori.
- John Gary Clarke – of Christchurch. For services to sport and philanthropy.
- Edward Laurence Collins – of Blenheim. For services to the fishing industry and the community.
- Maria Elizabeth Caroline Collins – of Auckland. For services to the community and music.
- Mary Isabel Corbett JP – of Christchurch. For services to the community.
- Leonie Ellen Corry – of Leeston. For services to the community.
- William Ross Duncan – of Whanganui. For services to pipe bands and the community.
- Alister David Eade – of Stewart Island. For services to the community and aquaculture.
- Helena Wanda Ellis – of Auckland. For services to the Polish community.
- Reverend Tom Etuata – of Wellington. For services to the Pacific community.
- Dr Mustafa Mohammed Farouk – of Hamilton. For services to the Muslim community.
- Raymond Gardner – of Fairlie. For services to the New Zealand Fire Service.
- Heather Mackness Gladstone – of Christchurch. For services to music.
- Marjory Jean Goldschmidt – of Wellsford. For services to the community.
- Peter Vaughan Hallagan – of Waipukurau. For services to the New Zealand Fire Service.
- Colin John Hallett – of Te Aroha. For services to Search and Rescue and outdoor recreation.
- John Kellick Harding – of Taihape. For services to agriculture and aviation.
- Margaret Patricia Hayward – of Waikanae. For services to the community.
- Christine Joan Hill – of Tākaka. For services to healthcare.
- James Alexander Scott Howard – of Marton. For services to conservation and the community.
- Wayne Buckston Hurunui – of Shannon. For services to the New Zealand Fire Service and the community.
- Archdeacon Emeritus Andrew Joseph – of Nelson. For services to the community.
- Margaret Rose Knight – of Te Awamutu. For services to music and the community.
- John Wayland Logan – of Gisborne. For services to the community.
- Afa'ese Manoa – of Auckland. For services to the Pacific community.
- Hinetaina McIlroy – of Tolaga Bay. For services to the community.
- Devon William McLean – of Nelson. For services to conservation.
- Teariki Derrick Mei – of Wairoa. For services to Māori.
- Alexandra Jocelyn Ann Midgley – of Christchurch. For services to the arts and the community.
- Toni Ann Millar JP – of Auckland. For services to the community.
- Prabodh Kumar Mishra JP – of Lower Hutt. For services to the community.
- Tereapii Moetaua Russell – of Upper Hutt. For services to the Pacific community and sport.
- Janet Ruth Morgan JP – of Tākaka. For services to healthcare.
- Glenn Robert Mottram JP – of Auckland. For services to the community.
- Paddianne Wallace Neely – of Wellington. For services as an archivist.
- Ian Alexander Noble – of Katikati. For services to farming and the community.
- Keith Arthur John Norton – of Christchurch. For services to the New Zealand Fire Service and Urban Search and Rescue.
- Marie Maude Palmer JP – of Hastings. For services to the community.
- Nooareauri Pare – of Auckland. For services to Pacific culture and the community.
- Beverly Dawn Patterson – of Wellington. For services to the community.
- Bruce John Patterson – of Wellington. For services to the community.
- Valerie Jean Payne – of Auckland. For services to the community.
- Hoana Pearson – of Auckland. For services to Māori and education.
- David Bruce Poppelwell – of Auckland. For services to the community.
- Raman Ranchhod JP – of Auckland. For services to the Indian community.
- Frances Reynolds – of Auckland. For services to the State.
- Jean Valentine Rockel – of Auckland. For services to early childhood education.
- Berys Marie Ross – of Te Puke. For services to the community.
- Major Barbara June Sampson – of Christchurch. For services to the community.
- Neill Campbell Simpson – of Queenstown. For services to conservation.
- David Neil Sinclair – of Ashburton. For services to philanthropy and the community.
- Klara Marta Szentirmay – of Wellington. For services to the Hungarian community.
- To'alepai Lui Tautolo – of Auckland. For services to sport and the Samoan community.
- Hai Tong Too JP – of Napier. For services to the Chinese community. (Note: Deceased. Her Majesty's approval of this award took effect on 12 November 2014, prior to the date of decease.)
- Jennifer Anne McKinlay Vanstone – of Te Puke. For services to the community.
- Bruce Ross Warren – of Auckland. For services to the community.
- Shirley Elizabeth Warren – of Auckland. For services to the community.
- Alan Scott Watson – of Auckland. For services as a magician.
- Brian Stephen Watters – of Morrinsville. For services to the New Zealand Fire Service.
- Janice Diane Webb – of Auckland. For services to music.
- Jeremy Forbes Whimster – of Tauranga. For services to music.
- Peter Humphrey Willsman – of Queenstown. For services to conservation and the community.
- Coralie Diane Winn – of Christchurch. For services to the arts.
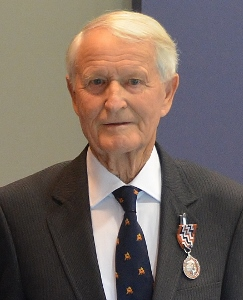
Chris Barfoot

Joy Boniface

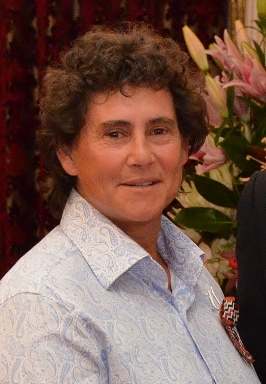
Chris Hill

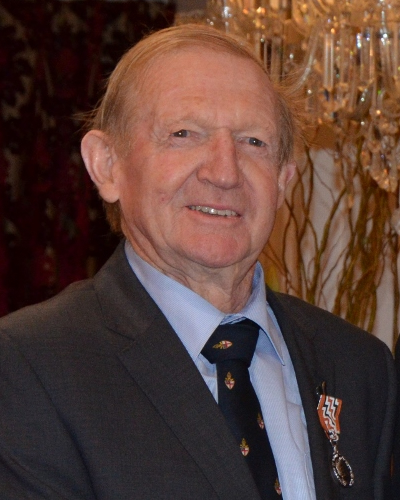
Jim Howard

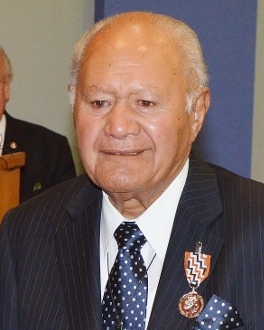
Andy Joseph

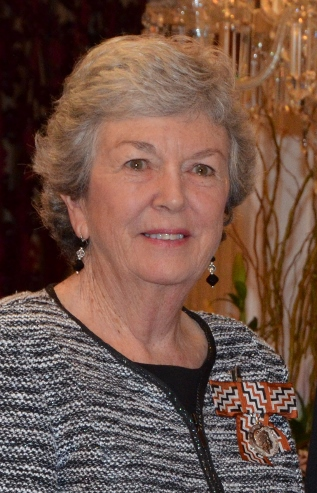
Jan Morgan

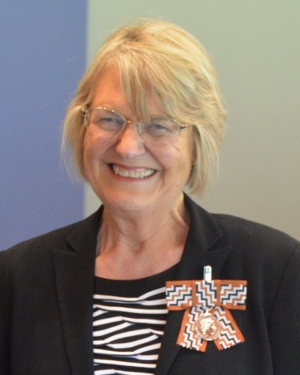
Paddianne Neely

Neill Simpson

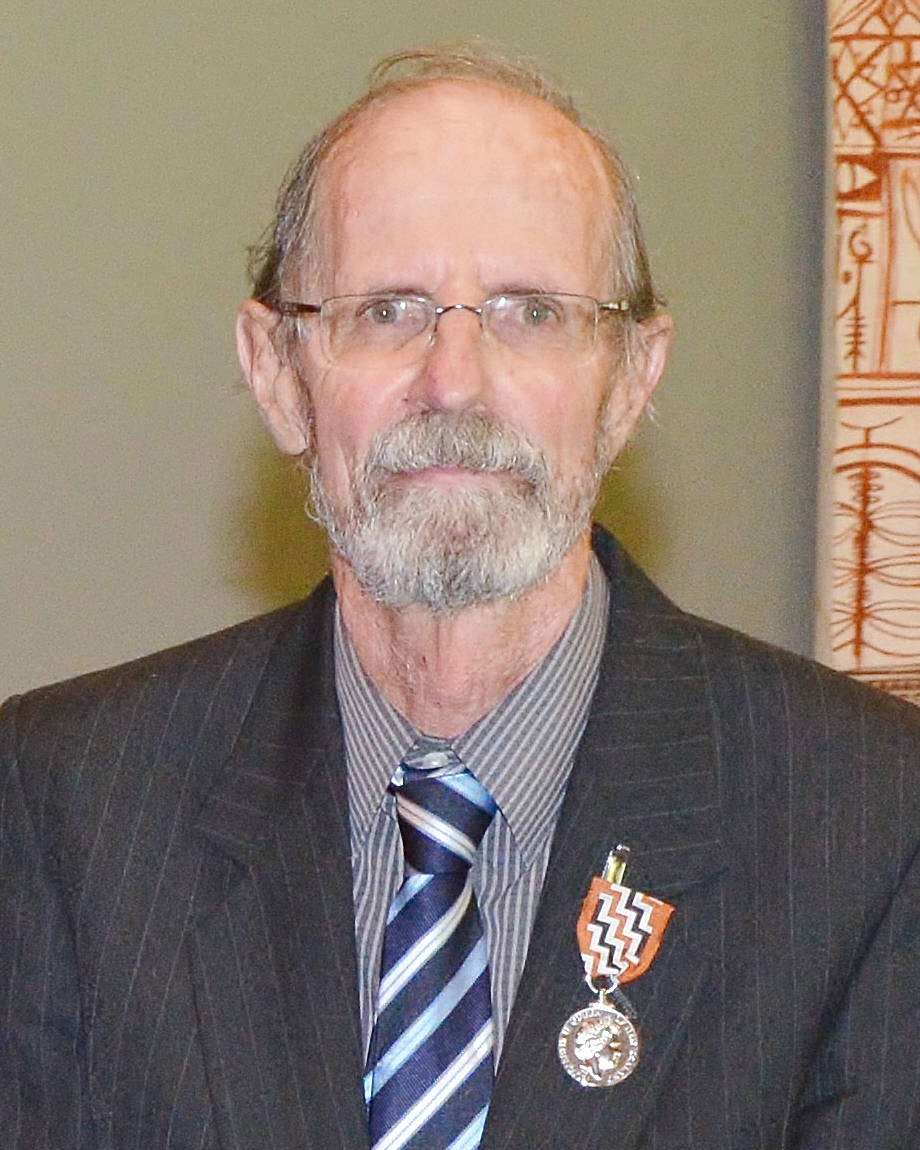
Ross Warren

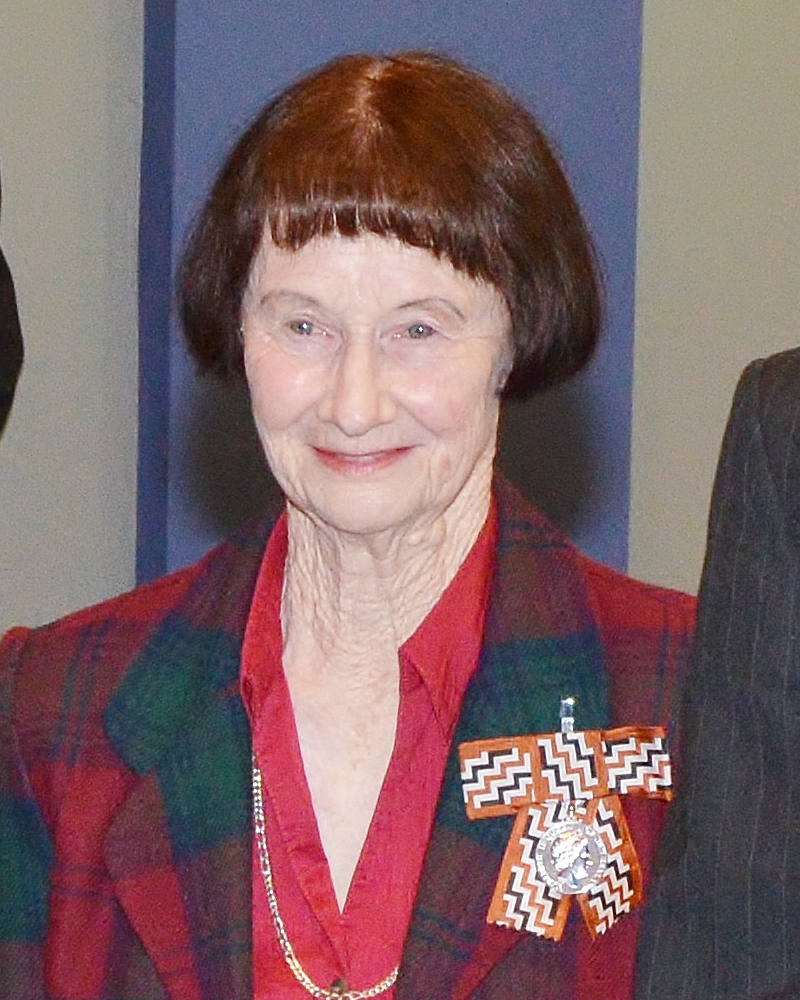
Shirley Warren

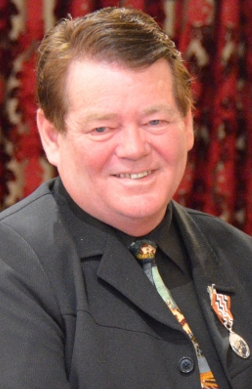
Alan Watson

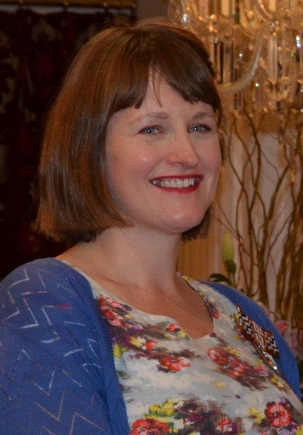
Coralie Winn

== New Zealand Antarctic Medal (NZAM) ==
- Lewis Vernon Sanson – of Wellington. For services to Antarctic science and conservation.
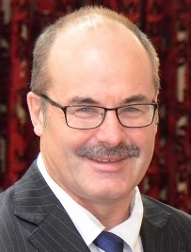
Lou Sanson

== New Zealand Distinguished Service Decoration (DSD) ==
- Warrant Officer David Tale Hamill – of Auckland. For services to the New Zealand Defence Force.
- Captain Andrew Ross Mckinlay – of Wellington. For services to the New Zealand Defence Force.
- Serviceman B. For services to the New Zealand Defence Force.
- Major Michael Nochete – of Christchurch. For services to the New Zealand Defence Force.
- Flight Sergeant Murray John Thomson – of Auckland. For services to the New Zealand Defence Force.

== New Zealand Bravery Medal (NZBM) ==
- Daniel James Rockhouse. The citation reads:

On 19 November 2010 a methane explosion occurred at Pike River Coal Mine, killing 29 miners working deep in the mine. The explosion cut the electricity supply to the mine, shutting off lighting and ventilation systems. The mine began to fill with smoke and carbon monoxide.

Daniel Rockhouse was driving a loader approximately 1,700 metres into the main drive of the mine when the explosion occurred and he was thrown to the ground and knocked unconscious. When he regained consciousness Mr Rockhouse put on his self-rescuer (breathing apparatus) and dragged himself to a nearby telephone. He rang Service Control and spoke to the mine manager, who told him to make his way to the fresh air base (FAB) near the mine portal, and contact him again. Mr Rockhouse started making his way to the FAB, following water pipes along the wall. He came across another miner, lying on the ground semi-conscious and disoriented. He attempted to give the miner his self-rescuer, but he could not close his mouth around the unit. Mr Rockhouse dragged him to the FAB, where they found the door open and the FAB full of carbon monoxide. Mr Rockhouse continued to drag the miner towards the mine portal. They were able to breathe some fresh air from compressed air lines along the way, and eventually the miner's condition improved enough to walk. They then supported each other and hobbled out of the mine. The rescue of the other man had taken Mr Rockhouse approximately two hours. By the time he reached the mine exit, Mr Rockhouse was disoriented, and was suffering from the effects of smoke and gas inhalation. Both men were taken to Greymouth Hospital where Mr Rockhouse was treated for smoke and gas inhalation, and carbon monoxide poisoning.

Without Mr Rockhouse's assistance, the other miner would have remained lying in the mine. It is highly unlikely that he would have been able to rescue himself. Mr Rockhouse's determination to rescue him slowed down his own escape from the mine, through poisonous gas and smoke and constantly fearing further explosions.
