= Lawrence Babits =

American archaeologist (born 1943)

- Born: June 22, 1943; Blytheville, Arkansas
- Education: University of Maryland, College Park; Brown University
- Occupations: Professor of maritime archaeology and history at East Carolina University

Lawrence E. Babits (born June 22, 1943) is an American archaeologist with specific interests in military history, material culture, and battlefield and maritime archaeology. Babits is credited with highly accurate accounts of soldiers' combat experience during the 18th century, specifically during the Battle of Cowpens, a turning point in the American Revolutionary War. This is illustrated in his books Long, Obstinate and Bloody: The Battle of Guilford Courthouse (coauthored with Joshua B. Howard) and A Devil of a Whipping: The Battle of Cowpens. Babits was a George Washington Distinguished Professor of Maritime Archaeology and History at East Carolina University.

== Biography ==
Babits was born in Blytheville, Arkansas on June 22, 1943. He graduated from Surrattsville High School in Clinton, Maryland in 1961. During his youth he was a member of the Boy Scouts and in his junior year of high school became an Eagle Scout. The year he graduated from high school, Babits worked as a carpenter's apprentice in Washington, D.C. In 1963 he joined the United States Army where he served for three years as an infantryman. Babits left the Army at the rank of Sergeant and with an honorable discharge in 1966. From there he went to the University of Maryland, College Park to receive his Bachelor of Arts in anthropology with a minor in history in 1969. From then until 1973, Babits worked for the university as a teaching assistant and continued to work to receive his Master's degree in 1974 from Maryland. Babits began working as an archaeologist for the North Carolina Department of Environment and Natural Resources in Raleigh, North Carolina and later became a teaching fellow in archaeology field methods. To further his education, Babits went to Brown University to work as a teaching assistant and eventually teach his own courses through the Sociology and Anthropology departments at Washington and Lee University from 1980 to 1981. Babits earned his Doctor of Philosophy in 1981 from Brown and his dissertation was entitled Military Documents and Archaeological Site: Methodological Contributions to Historical Archaeology. That same year he was inducted into Phi Alpha Theta, an honor society for history scholars. Between 1971 and 1985 he also wrote sports articles in his spare time for various newspapers. With his Ph.D., Babits continued to teach as an assistant professor of history and archaeology at Armstrong State College in Georgia. From there Babits went to East Carolina University, where he currently resides as director of the Maritime History and Nautical Archaeology program in Greenville, North Carolina. Some of the classes he teaches include Battlefield Archaeology, Revolutionary War in the South, Living History, 18th Century Warfare, History and Theory of Nautical Archaeology, American Maritime Material Culture, Field Research in Maritime History, and Seafaring.

In 1996 he served as a guest faculty coach for the ECU softball team. Throughout the years Babits has published a number of works including the book, A Devil of a Whipping: The Battle of Cowpens which describes the Battle of Cowpens that took place during the American Revolutionary War. It was won by the Americans on January 17, 1781, in Cowpens, South Carolina through the use of original tactical maneuvers. Babits gives estimations of troop numbers for both sides and details the events of the battle. The book was the winner of a Distinguished Book Award in 1998 from the Army Historical Foundation as well as the honorable mention book award from the Fraunces Tavern Museum/Sons of the Revolution. Babits’ most recent book is entitled Long, Obstinate and Bloody: The Battle of Guilford Courthouse. During the 1980s, Babits served as director for the Coastal Heritage Society and the Center for Low Country Studies and served as the acting director of the Museum and Preservation Studies Program at Armstrong State College.

Babits is married with one child. In his free time away from academics he has enjoyed playing, coaching, and refereeing rugby since his early twenties.

== Awards and recognitions ==
Throughout his career in archaeology, Babits has been acknowledged by many scholarly bodies for his hard work in the form of recognitions and awards. In 2007 Babits received the honor of becoming a Fellow in the Company of Military Historians. Babits was recognized by the North Carolina Society of the Cincinnati with the George Washington Distinguished Professor of History award while teaching at East Carolina University. In 1995 Babits earned the McCann-Taggert Lectureship in Underwater Archaeology from the American Institute of Archaeology. The National Society for the Daughters of the American Revolution awarded him a History Medal in 1990. That same year the faculty of Armstrong State College awarded Babits the Curmudgeon Award and in 1985 he also received the H. Dean Probst Award for Outstanding Faculty Member, which is decided by the students.

== Societies and organizations ==
Babits holds membership positions in a number of professional societies. He is a member of the Society for Historical Archaeology which focuses on “the dissemination of knowledge concerning historical archaeology” and “the identification, excavation, interpretation, and conservation of sites and materials on land and underwater.” He is a member of the Nautical Archaeology Society from the United Kingdom that strives to continue and improve upon nautical archaeological techniques. The Company of Military Historians is another society to which Babits belongs. It involves the continuation of studies of "information on the uniforms, equipment, history, and traditions of members of the Armed Forces of the United States worldwide and other nations serving in the Western Hemisphere." He also received the Life Member award in 1992 from the Coastal Georgia Archaeological Society. Furthermore, Babits is part of the First Maryland Regiment living history organization from the Revolutionary War and the First and Second Maryland Regiment living history organization from the American Civil War. He has been a part of that organization since 1967 and is currently still involved in its workings.

== Publications ==
=== Books and monographs ===
- Underwater Archaeology 1998. Tucson, AZ: Society for Historical Archaeology, 1998. Co-edited with Catherine Fach and Ryan Harris.
- Maritime Archaeology: A Guide to Theoretical and Substantive Contributions. New York, NY: Plenum Press, 1998. Co-edited with Hans Van Tilburg.
- A Devil of a Whipping: The Battle of Cowpens. Chapel Hill, NC: University of North Carolina Press, 1998.
- Southern Campaigns. Philadelphia, PA: Eastern National, 2002.
- Fortitude and Forbearance: The North Carolina Continental Line in the Revolutionary War, 1775-1783. Raleigh, NC: Archives and History, North Carolina Department of Cultural Resources, 2004. Co-authored with Joshua Howard.
- Fields of Conflict: Battlefield Archaeology from the Roman Empire to the Korean War. Westport, CT: Praeger Security International, 2006. Co-edited with Douglas Scott and Charles Haecker.
- Long, Obstinate, and Bloody: The Battle of Guilford Courthouse. Chapel Hill, NC: University of North Carolina Press, 2008. Co-authored with Joshua Howard.
- Fields of Conflict: Battlefield Archaeology from the Roman Empire to the Korean War. Washington, D.C.: Potomac Books, 2009. Co-edited with Douglas Scott and Charles Haecker.

=== Journals ===
- "Exploring a Civil War Sidewheeler". Archaeology, 1994.
- "Supplying the Southern Army, March 1780-September 1781". Military Collector and Historian XLVII, 1995.
- "Bullets from the Maple Leaf". Military Collector and Historian XLVII, 1995.
- "Rubber Poncho and Blankets from the Union Transport Maple Leaf". Military Collector and Historian XLVII, 1995.
- "A Working Definition of 'Periauger'". Proceedings of the 29th Annual Conference on Historical and Underwater Archaeology. Tucson, AZ: Society for Historical Archaeology, 1996.
- "Locating the Small Boat in the Archaeological Record: A Model from the North Carolina Sounds". Transactions, 1997. With Annalies C. Kjorness.
- "Reconstructing the 1740 Scoutboat Savannah". Transactions, 1997. With Deirdre O'Regan.
- "Rapport de Fouilles Relatif aux Vestiges Francais de la Guerre de l'Independence Americaine Trouves a Savannah, Georgie, Aux Etats-Unis". Carnet de la Sabretache, 1998. With Thomas Babits.
- "1785 Common Sailors' Clothing and a Ship's Camboose from the General Carleton of Whitby". Underwater Archeology 1998. Tucson AZ: Society for Historical Archaeology, 1999. Co-Authored with Waldemar Ossowski, Museum Morskie, Gdansk, Poland.
- "Pirates". Tributaries, 2001.
- "Reproducing a Periauger". Sea History Winter, 2004.

=== Book chapters ===
- "A Derelict Small Boat Survey, Pamlico Drainage, North Carolina, USA". In Down the River to the Sea. Oxford, UK: Archaeopress, 2000. With Annalies Corbin.
- "'Book Archaeology' of the Cowpens Battlefield". In Fields of Conflict: Progress and Prospect in Battlefield Archaeology. British Archaeological Reports International Series, 2001. Edited by P.W.M. Freeman and A. Pollard.
- "Maritime Archaeology in North Carolina". In The International Handbook of Underwater Archaeology. New York, NY: Plenum Press, 2001. Edited by Carol V. Ruppe and Janet F. Barstad.
- "Pirate Imagery". In X Marks the Spot. Gainesville, FL: University Press of Florida, 2006. With Matthew Brenckle and Joshua Howard. Edited by Charles Ewen and Russell Skrownek.
