= Joe Babich =

New Zealand winemaker (1940–2022)

Joe Babich ONZM
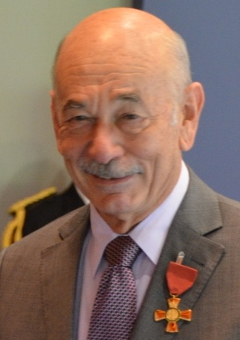
- Babich in 2015
- Born: Joseph Frank Babich; 10 October 1940
- Died: 13 January 2022 (aged 81)
- Occupation: Winemaker
- Known for: Babich Wines

Joseph Frank Babich ONZM (10 October 1940 – 13 January 2022) was a New Zealand winemaker. He was among those involved in the transformation of the New Zealand wine industry from the 1970s.

== Biography ==
Born on 10 October 1940, Babich was the son of Josip Babich, who founded Babich Wines, and Mara Babich (née Grgich). He was educated at Henderson High School, and after leaving school, he began working for the family company in 1958. At that time, they produced mainly fortified wines and generic red and white wines.

Babich founded the Young Winemakers' Group, and was in the vanguard of those who worked to modernise production and raise standards in the New Zealand wine industry in the 1970s. He helped to pioneer vineyards in new areas of New Zealand, and produced one of the first chardonnays in New Zealand to be fermented and matured in barrels on its yeast lees. Babich was the firm's winemaker for 35 vintages, and took over as managing director in the mid-1990s.

Babich was active as a wine judge for 35 years until retiring from that role in 1998. He was a six-time chair of judges at the Air New Zealand Wine Awards, and also judged at the Royal Easter Show Wine Awards.

In 1994, Babich won the Winemaker of the Year Award at the Royal Easter Show Wine Awards, and at the 2013 New Zealand International Wine Show he received the Sir George Fistonich Medal for service to New Zealand wine. In the 2015 New Year Honours, Babich was appointed an Officer of the New Zealand Order of Merit, for services to the wine industry. Later in 2015, both he and his brother, Peter, were inducted into the New Zealand Wine Hall of Fame. The following year, he was inducted into the West Auckland Business Hall of Fame.

Outside of the wine business, Babich was involved in the establishment of the Henderson High School Foundation, and provided assistance to the Waitemata Rugby Club.

Babich died on 13 January 2022, at the age of 81, and was buried at Waikumete Cemetery.
