= Staša Babić =

Serbian archaeologist

- Occupation: Archaeologist

Academic work
- Institutions: University of Belgrade

Staša Babić is a Serbian archaeologist and an associate professor of archaeology in the Department of Archaeology, Faculty of Philosophy, University of Belgrade. Her research focuses on the Iron Age and archaeological theory.

== Education ==
Babić graduated with an undergraduate degree in 1986, and a master's degree in 1989, from the University of Belgrade. Babić gained a doctorate from the University of Belgrade in 1998. From 2009, she was Head of Department of Archaeology at the University of Belgrade.

Her 2018 monograph Metaarheologija discusses the nature of archaeological knowledge, with an emphasis on the importance of collective knowledge versus paradigm shifts. Babić is described as "one of the key thinkers in archaeological theory from the Balkans".

== Selected publications ==
- Babić, S. 2002. ‘Still innocent after all these years?’ Sketches for a Social History of Archaeology in Serbia. In: Biehl, P.F., Gramsch, A. & Marciniak, A., eds. Archäologien Europas: Geschichte, Methoden und Theorien/Archaeologies of Europe: History, Methods and Theories. Tübinger Archäologische Taschenbücher 3. Münster: Waxmann, pp. 309–22.Google Scholar
- (coauthors M. Diaz Andreu, S. J. Lucy, D. Edwards) 2005. The Archaeology of Identity, Approaches to gender, age, status, ethnicity and religion. London and New York: Routledge.
- S. Babić. 2008. Grci i drugi – antička percepcija i percepcija antike (Greeks and Others – Ancient Perceptions and Perceptions of Antiquity. Beograd: Klio.
- Babić, S. 2014. Identity, Integration and Power Relations in the Study of the Iron Age. In: Stoddard, S. & Popa, C., eds. Fingerprinting the Iron Age: Integrating South-Eastern Europe into the Debate. Oxford: Oxbow, pp. 295–302.
- Babić, Staša, et al. 2017. What is ‘European Archaeology’? What should it be?. European Journal of Archaeology 20.1: 4-35.
- S. Babić. 2018. Metaarheologija. Ogled o uslovima znanja o prošlosti (Metaarchaeology: An Essay on the Conditions of Knowledge about the Past. Belgrade: Clio.
