= Bob Babich =

Bob Babich may refer to:

- Bob Babich (American football coach) (born 1961), American football coach
- Bob Babich (linebacker) (1947–2022), American football player
