= Gregory Victor Babic =

Australian author

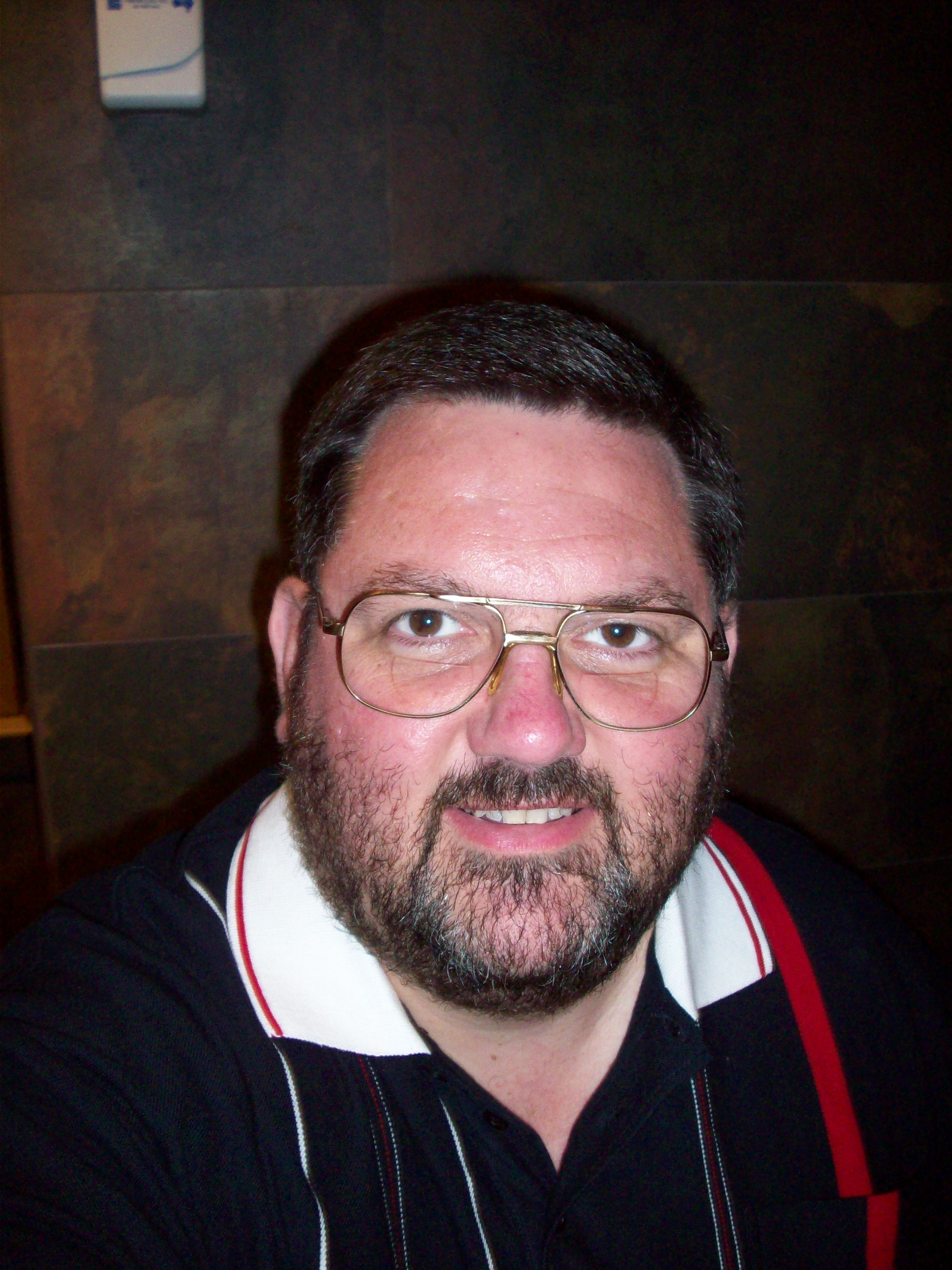
- Born: 16 October 1963; Melbourne, Australia
- Died: 12 January 2013 (aged 49)
- Occupations: Author and writer
- Website: www.gregbabic.com

Gregory Victor Babic (16 October 1963 – 12 January 2013) was an Australian author of non-fiction and fiction.

== Life ==
Babic was born in Melbourne, but moved to Sydney at about one month of age and lived in that city until he moved to Orange in the Central West of New South Wales in May 2010.

He graduated from Sydney Boys High School in 1981 (with the Higher School Certificate), the University of Sydney in 1990 (with a Bachelor of Arts degree), the University of New South Wales in 1992 (with a Graduate Diploma in Secondary Education), and was a targeted graduate (one of the "best of the best" from across the state of New South Wales) first employed by the New South Wales Department of Education and Training in 1993 (when he earned his Teacher's Certificate). At various times he has taught English, History, General Studies, and Retail Operations in numerous public sector secondary schools in the greater Sydney metropolitan area.

He worked briefly in the Australian Federal Police as a Constable in the mid-1980s. He was the President of his Recruit Training Class, and received the prize "For Excellence in Law Practice" upon graduation. However, in his second year it became clear to him that the AFP was not a good fit for him and vice versa, so he resigned to finish his education and become a teacher.

He wrote two non-fiction books for the education market, Study Success Know-How: A 1,001-Point Action Checklist Designed To Help You Take Control of Your Learning And Maximise Your Achievement Potential – Immediately! (ISBN 1-876932-19-8) and Film Study Terms: A glossary of key concepts related to the study of Film (ISBN 1-876932-97-X) – both of which are published by Five Senses Education Pty Ltd. His third non-fiction book, Words to Inspire Writers: A perpetual Calendar of classic Writing-related Quotations – on Writers, Writing, Words, Books, Literature, and Publishing – specifically selected to illustrate the Writing Process and to motivate Authors every day (ISBN 978-0-980372-20-5), was published by F. C. Sach & Sons, Publishers, in January 2008, and has now been released under a Creative Commons Attribution-Non-Commercial-No Derivative Works 3.0 Unported License, to provide Motivation for Writers Every Day of the Year Without Cost.

His writing won the University of Sydney Union Literary Competition (Prose Section) and the Henry Lawson Prize for Prose (administered by the University of Sydney). He had his first young adult novel, The Profile (ISBN 978-0-9822-0566-2), published by All Things That Matter Press, as well as his adult contemporary thriller (inspired by his own service in the Australian Federal Police), The Last Loose End (ISBN 978-0-9822-7226-8), which was his first published novel for a general adult audience, but his fifth published book. He chose not to renew his contract with this publisher in 2010 and both of these novels are now listed as being out of print.

He died in 2013.

== Awards ==
- Henry Lawson Prize for Prose, administered by the University of Sydney.
- University of Sydney Union Literary Competition (Prose Section).

== Bibliography ==
=== Novels ===
- The Last Loose End (2009) ISBN 978-0-9822722-6-8

=== Young adult ===
- The Profile (2009) ISBN 978-0-9822056-6-2

=== Edited ===
- Words to Inspire Writers (2008) ISBN 978-0-9803722-0-5

=== Non-fiction ===
- Study Success Know-How – Second Edition (2002) ISBN 1-876932-19-8
- Film Study Terms (2003) ISBN 1-876932-97-X
