= New Zealand Wine Hall of Fame =

- Awarded for: Individuals who have made a significant contribution to the wine industry in New Zealand
- Country: New Zealand
- First award: 2005

The New Zealand Wine Hall of Fame is a figurative hall of fame dedicated to individuals who have made a significant contribution to the development the wine industry in New Zealand. The hall was announced in 2004, and the first ten inductions were made the following year.

== Laureates ==
The following is a complete list of laureates of the New Zealand Wine Hall of Fame, up to inductions in 2021.

Year	Laureate
2005	James Busby
2005	Romeo Bragato
2005	Heinrich Breidecker
2005	Charles Levet
2005	Joseph Soler
2005	Israel Wendel
2005	Friedrich Wohnsiedler
2005	Assid Abraham Corban
2005	Tom McDonald
2005	George Mazuran
2006	Mate Brajkovich
2006	Alex Corban
2006	David Hohnen
2006	Frank Yukich
2007	Joseph Annis Corban
2007	Richard Smart
2007	Ross Spence
2008	Bryan Mogridge
2008	Kevyn Moore
2009	Peter Hubscher
2009	Terry Dunleavy
2010	Ross Goodin
2010	Richard Riddiford
2011	George Fistonich
2012	John Buck
2013	Jane Hunter
2013	Bob Campbell
2014	Alan Brady
2014	Larry McKenna
2015	Peter Babich
2015	Joe Babich
2016	Oz Clarke
2017	Alan Limmer
2018	Mike Trought
2019	Raymond Chan
2019	Kate Radburnd
2021	Michael Brett
