= Valery Babich =

Ukrainian writer

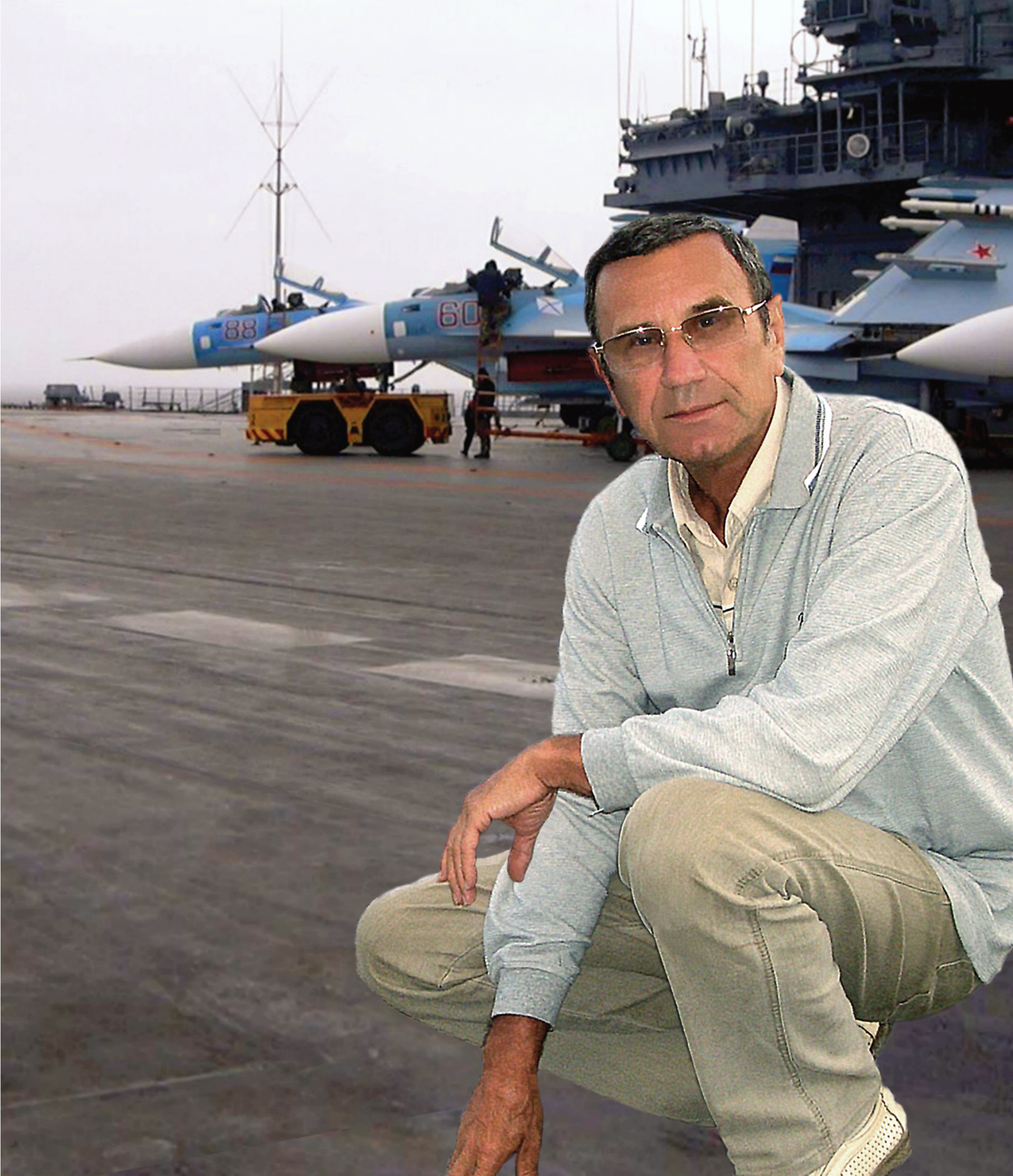
- I built it: Valery Babich aboard the aircraft carrier Admiral Kuznetsov
- Born: 27 January 1941 (age 85); Zaporizhia, Ukrainian SSR
- Occupations: prose, novelist, essayist
- Writing career
- Genre: Russian literature
- Notable work: Our aircraft carriers (2003)

Valery Babich (Russian: Вале́рий Васи́льевич Ба́бич) (born January 27, 1941) is a Ukrainian writer, ethnographer and journalist. Until 1991 was an engineer shipbuilder, head of the design bureau at Department of chief designer of Black Sea Shipyard in Mykolaiv on aircraft carriers and S.U. ground complex testing of naval aviation in Crimea. In the late 1990s, he began publishing articles on the history of the construction of aircraft-carrying ships, and in 2003 his first book, “Our Aircraft Carriers,” was published.

== Life ==
Born in Zaporizhia, Ukraine Valery Babich moved to Mykolaiv with his parents in 1950. In 1955 he entered the Shipbuilding Nikolaev College, which graduated in 1959. After graduating from college, Babich worked from 1959 to 1962 as an electrician at the Shipyard named after 61 Communards.

== Shipbuilding ==
In 1967, Valery Babich finished Mykolayiv Shipbuilding Institute. After graduation assigned to work to chief designer department of Black Sea Shipyard. He took part in the work of the weapons complexes of helicopter carriers Moskva and Leningrad. Later during 1970–1991 he worked on the construction of all soviet aircraft carriers: Kiev (1970–1975), Minsk (1976–1978), Novorossiysk, Baku, Tbilisi, Varyag and Ulyanovsk (1979–1991).

== Literary creativity ==
Valery Babich engaged in literary and journalistic activities since 2000. He is a Member of the National Union of Journalists of Ukraine, Writers' Union of Russia, winner of the regional competition of Mykolaiv media ProMedia (2002) awards Golden Pen (2006) and named after Mykola Arkas (2012).

Selected bibliography:

- Our aircraft carriers (2003) Russian: Наши авианосцы.
- The city of Saint Nicholas and his aircraft carriers (2009) Город Святого Николая и его авианосцы.
- Lords of the Oceans (2017) Властелины океанов.
- Journalists of the city of St. Nicholas. History and destiny (2011) Журналисты города святого Николая. История и судьбы
