= Scott Carter (sports administrator) =

New Zealand sports administrator

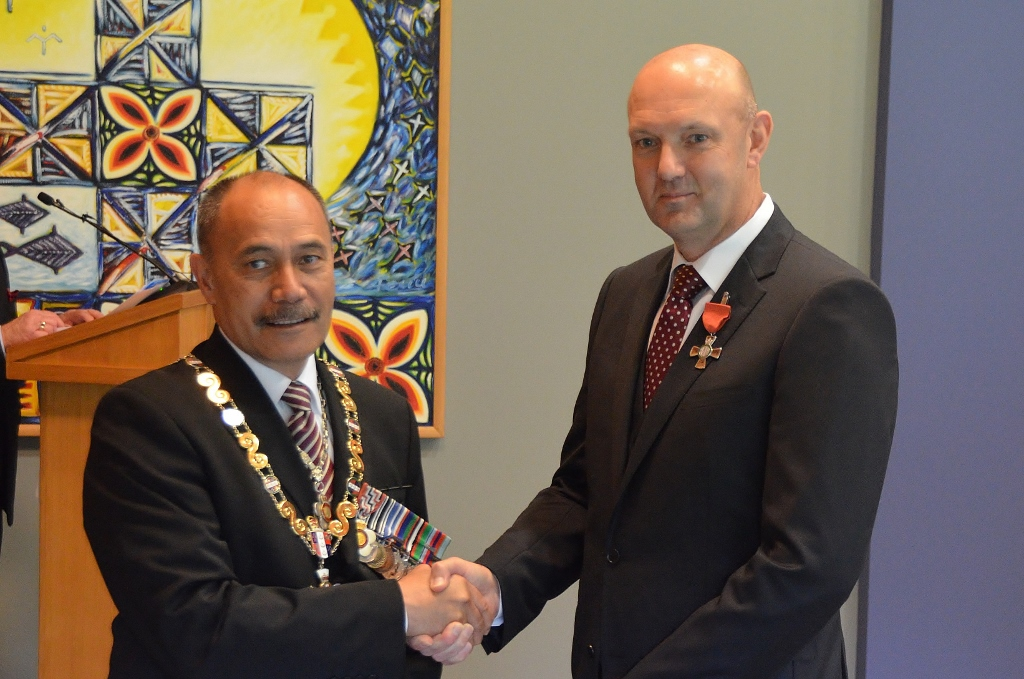
Carter (right) in 2015, after his investiture as a Member of the New Zealand Order of Merit by the governor-general, Sir Jerry Mateparae

Scott Jonathan Carter MNZM is a New Zealand sports administrator who previously served as the chairman of the Rugby League International Federation.

== Administration career ==
Carter grew up in the King Country and attended Auckland Grammar from 1977 to 1981.

Carter is a former New Zealand Police officer who served in Auckland from 1984 - 1989 before entering the security industry. He was one of the founding shareholders of the company now known as Matrix Security Group in 1993 which is New Zealands largest private security firm with over 550 employees across both the north and south islands. Joining the board of the New Zealand Security Association from 2002 to 2010, he became chairman in 2003 until 2007. He championed improved industry training, professional standards and new legislation., receiving recognition from the New Zealand Security Association for this work in 2011.

Carter was the chairman of Olympic equestrian sport Eventing NZ and a board member of the New Zealand Equestrian Federation from 1999 to 2001. He joined the board of New Zealand Rugby League as an independent director in 2008 following a period of significant difficulty for the sport.

In 2009 Carter was appointed as the New Zealand Rugby League chairman by Sport New Zealand, following a Sir John Anderson-led review of rugby league in New Zealand.

In June 2011 he was appointed the chairman of the Rugby League International Federation, and was the first New Zealander to hold the role, overseeing constitutional reform for the world governing body and securing a permanent board seat for New Zealand. He was re-appointed to the New Zealand Rugby League board for a further three years in 2012 but stood down from both the national and international roles in June 2014.

In the 2015 New Year Honours, Carter was appointed a Member of the New Zealand Order of Merit for services to sport.
