= Safet Babic =

German politician

Safet Babic (born 1981) is a German politician of Bosnian descent. He has been a candidate for the far-right National Democratic Party of Germany (NPD) in European, parliamentary, state assembly and local elections.

Babic first came to prominence at the University of Trier where, as a law student, he was active in student politics for the NPD. From June 2009 till September 2011 he was member of the Trier city council.

== Biography ==
Babic was born in 1981, in Hanau. Babic's parents are from Bosnia and Herzegovina and came to West Germany in the 1970s as Gastarbeiter. He describes himself as a "European liberation activist of Bosnian origin". Aged thirteen, he began to engage with the political programmes of right-wing parties, right-wing magazines, right-wing music, and he distributed flyers for The Republicans and the German People's Union.

After Babic submitted his membership application to the Young National Democrats (JN; now the Young Nationalists), he had to appear before the committee, as his application was not automatically accepted. They ultimately voted seven-to-five in favour of his admission. This led to a scandal amongst the JN: several of the leading cadre from North Rhine-Westphalia and Baden-Württemberg resigned in protest, along with state chairman Lars Käppler and the entire Saxony state board. Their rationale was, those who fight against multiculturalism cannot be multicultural themselves. According to them, the "principle of lineage" was violated, and continued membership in the organisation would be Volksverrat. The JN federal chairman, Sascha Roßmüller, defended the organisation's position, saying that they had sought to "integrate positive elements into the Volksgemeinschaft". The JN federal managing director said that Babic had an "extremely Nordic appearance" and was "much more German than some of us".

After his 2001 admission to the University of Trier to study law, Babic became involved in the Trier AStA and participated in strikes and protests, such as one against the introduction of tuition fees. He concealed his membership in the NPD and sought to gain the trust of the left-wing scene in Trier. After about a year of activity, which Babic described as his "time as a mole", his membership was revealed, and he was expelled from the Trier AStA. In response to his exposure, Babic founded the "Free Social List" (FSL) at the University of Trier. While he lost by a small margin in the 2002 student parliament elections, he succeeded at the end of 2003. After he was elected, students protested the first meeting of the parliament with banners such as "No Room for Nazis", and Babic responded with motions to hang the German flag at all meetings.

Babic unsuccessfully ran in the 2004 European Parliament election, ranking 21st. He also unsuccessfully ran for the 2005 Bundestag election, where he ranked fourth on the state list for Rhineland-Palatinate, and as a Direktmandat for the Trier electoral district. He narrowly won in the 2009 Trier city council elections, but was expelled in 2011 due to a prior criminal conviction from a year prior.

Babic's March 2006 lecture of the topic "National democratic Hochschule politics in the Bundesrepublik", delivered to the Ring of Free Students (RFS; the student wing of the Freedom Party of Austria) and the Viennese Burschenschaft Gothia, sparked nationwide discussions in Austria about the RFS' connections to the far-right scene.
