= Josip Babich =

New Zealand gum-digger, winemaker, farmer

Josip Petrov Babich (23 October 1895 – 22 August 1983) was a New Zealand gum-digger, winemaker and farmer. He was born in Runović, Dalmatia, Cisleithania, Austria-Hungary, on 23 October 1895. He left Dalmatia due to Austro-Hungarian military conscription in 1910. Babich founded Babich Wines. He was the father of Joe Babich, who followed him in leading the company.

He was a keen gardener, beekeeper, and photographer.
