= Brezje, Novo Mesto =

Brezje
- Location in Slovenia
- Coordinates: 45°49′31.82″N 15°15′21.99″E
- Country: Slovenia
- Traditional region: Lower Carniola
- Statistical region: Southeast Slovenia
- Municipality: Novo Mesto

Area
  - Total: 2.2 km^{2} (0.85 sq mi)
- Elevation: 215 m (705 ft)

Population (2026)
  - Total: 26
  - Density: 12/km^{2} (31/sq mi)
- Postal code: 8321

Brezje (pronounced [ˈbɾeːzjɛ]) is a small settlement in the City Municipality of Novo Mesto in southeastern Slovenia. It lies in the hills to the south of the main road between Novo Mesto and Šentjernej. The entire municipality is part of the traditional region of Lower Carniola and is now included in the Southeast Slovenia Statistical Region. In January 2026, the population was 26.

== Name ==
Brezje was attested in written sources as Pirkch in 1436. The name of the settlement is shared with several other places in Slovenia and is derived from the Slovene common noun brezje 'birch grove', referring to the local vegetation.
