= Krunoslav Babić =

Croatian zoologist

Krunoslav Babić (12 April 1875 – 4 March 1953) was a Croatian zoologist.

He was born in Senj. After finishing elementary school and high school in Senj and Rijeka, he received a degree at the Department of Mathematics and Physics at the Faculty of Philosophy in Zagreb in 1897. He received his PhD in 1899 with a thesis: Materials for the knowledge of Croatian fauna of water polyps (Građa za poznavanje hrvatske faune hidropolipa). He worked as a high school teacher in Osijek, Varaždin, Susak and Zemun.

In 1906 he was elected as a curator in the National Zoological Museum in Zagreb. At the same time he started working as a private docent, teaching morphology and systematics of invertebrates at the Faculty of Philosophy and the Higher Pedagogical School. He was appointed as a university professor of zoology in 1927, when he took over as the director of the Zoological Museum. He retired in 1945. Since 1940 he was a full member of the Croatian Academy of Sciences and Arts.

In his zoological research he mainly dealt with coelenterata, echinoderms and arthropods. He was especially interested in the sea fauna. He studied water polyps of the Adriatic Sea (Rad JAZU, 1898; Glasnik Hrvatskog naravoslovnog društva, 1903; Zoologischer Anzeiger, Leipzig 1911, 1912, 1914; Glasnik Hrvatskog prirodoslovnog društva, 1921), planktonic Coelenterata of scyphozoa and ctenophora (Rad JAZU, 1913), and also wrote several papers on sponges in the Adriatic, discovering several new species (Glasnik Hrvatskog prirodoslovnog društva, 1921; Zoologische Jahrbücher, Abt. für Systematik, Ökologie und Geographie der Tiere, Jena 1923). He further studied isopod and decapod crustaceans and starfishes (Zoologischer Anzeiger, 1912, 1913; Glasnik Hrvatskog prirodoslovnog društva, 1922), sea turtles (Priroda, 1920) and whale sharks (Zoologischer Anzeiger, 1939). He wrote on local species of Opiliones, freshwater sponges, Branchipus stagnalis crabs and blind cave decapods, and the development of faunal studies in Croatia (Glasnik Hrvatskog prirodoslovnog društva, 1916, 1927/1928). Sponge species Axinella babici is named in his honor.

He died in Opatija.

== Works ==
- Pogledi na biologičke i bionomičke odnose u Jadranskome moru, 1911, Zagreb
- Životinjstvo za niže razrede srednjih i njima sličnih škola (coauthored with Nikola Finka), 1926, Zagreb
- Život Jadranskoga mora, 1928, Zagreb
- Zoologija za više razrede srednjih škola, 1 and 2 (coauthored with Nikola Finka), 1936, Zagreb
- Životinjski svijet (in: Zemljopis Hrvatske, 2), 1942, p. 482–502, Zagreb
