= Ivan Babić (footballer, born 1981) =

Serbian footballer

Personal information
- Full name: Ivan Babić
- Date of birth: 2 August 1974 (age 52)
- Place of birth: Novo Selo, SFR Yugoslavia
- Height: 1.83 m (6 ft 0 in)
- Position: Centre-back

Team information
- Current team: Napredak Kruševac (assistant)

Youth career
- Omladinac Novo Selo
- Hajduk Jarčujak

Senior career*
Years	Team	Apps	(Gls)
1999	Borac Čačak	1	(0)
2000–2004	Napredak Kruševac	84	(5)
2004–2008	Partizan	0	(0)
2005	→ Obilić (loan)	28	(0)
2006	→ Rad (loan)	9	(0)
2006–2007	→ Bežanija (loan)	3	(0)
2008	→ Napredak Kruševac (loan)	10	(1)
2008	Tavriya Simferopol	0	(0)
2008–2010	Napredak Kruševac	37	(0)
2010–2012	Novi Pazar	45	(4)
2012	Metalac Gornji Milanovac	9	(0)
2013–2014	Borac Čačak	16	(0)
2014–2016	Sloga Kraljevo	42	(0)

Managerial career
- 2016–2017: Goč
- 2017: Temnić (assistant)
- 2018–2019: Tutin
- 2019: Napredak Kruševac (U19)
- 2019–: Napredak Kruševac (assistant)
- * Club domestic league appearances and goals as of 5 July 2016

Ivan Babić (Serbian Cyrillic: Иван Бабић; born 2 August 1974) is a Serbian retired footballer who played as a defender.

== Career ==
=== Club career ===
Babić made his debut for Borac Čačak in 1999, before moving to Napredak Kruševac in 2000. In June 2004, Babić signed a deal with Partizan. He played on loan at Obilić, Rad and Bežanija. He returned to Napredak Kruševac in the 2007–08 season. After three seasons, Babić moved to Novi Pazar in the summer of 2010. He scored first Serbian SuperLiga goal in the club's history for a 1–0 win against Smederevo.

=== Coaching career ===
After having working as U19 head coach for his former club FK Napredak Kruševac, Babić was promoted as assistant coach for the club's first team in December 2019 under his former teammate and newly appointed head coach Ivan Stefanović.
