= Frank Robson (conservationist) =

Logging contractor, fisherman, marine conservationist (1912–1993)

Frank Donald Robson QSO (29 September 1912 – 30 May 1993) was a New Zealand logging contractor, fisherman and marine conservationist.

Robson was born in Greenmeadows, New Zealand, in 1912. He was the first New Zealander to study whale strandings and the first systematic investigation of pollutant levels in marine mammals in New Zealand. His volunteer group, Project Jonah has saved thousands of marine mammals, continuing even after the Marine Mammals Protection Act 1978 made the Department of Conservation technically responsible for this.

In the 1989 New Year Honours, Robson was appointed a Companion of the Queen's Service Order for community service.
