= Melvin Day =

New Zealand artist (1923–2016)

Melvin Day CNZM
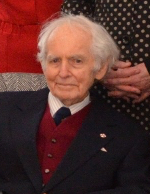
- Day in 2013

Director of the National Art Gallery
- In office 1968–1978
- Preceded by: Stewart Maclennan
- Succeeded by: Luit Bieringa

Government Art Historian
- In office 1978–1984

Personal details
- Born: 30 June 1923 Hamilton, New Zealand
- Died: 17 January 2016 (aged 92) Wellington, New Zealand
- Cause of death: Stroke
- Spouse: Oroya McAuley (m. 1952; died 2014)

Melvin Norman "Pat" Day CNZM (30 June 1923 – 17 January 2016) was a New Zealand artist and art historian.

== Biography ==
Day was born in Hamilton, New Zealand. At the age of eleven, Day began Saturday morning classes at Elam School of Art, University of Auckland, under the tutelage of Archie Fisher, John Weeks, Lois White and Ida Eise. In 1939, he went on to study as a full-time student at Elam, graduating with a preliminary diploma in fine arts two years later. Apart from a brief period at the Auckland Teachers' Training College, Day spent the remaining war years in the New Zealand Army and then the Royal New Zealand Air Force. Due to his drafting abilities he worked on topographical and landscape views of the Matakana area and Mototapu Islands.

He married Oroya McAuley in 1952 and lived and worked at that time in Rotorua. After a few years teaching and painting in the Rotorua area, Day arrived in Wellington in 1954 and took up studies towards a Bachelor of Arts at Victoria University of Wellington while teaching at Hutt Intermediate School. From the late 1950s onwards, he exhibited widely in New Zealand and his work was included in the 1961 Commonwealth Art Today exhibition at the Commonwealth Institute, London. In 1963 Day enrolled at the Courtauld Institute of Art, London, under the direction of art historian professor Anthony Blunt. At the Courtauld Institute, Day developed a fascination for the geometric precision in the paintings of Italian Renaissance artist, Paolo Uccello and began what were to become the celebrated modernist adaptations of his Uccello series.

In 1964 he participated in Young Commonwealth Painters at Whitechapel Gallery, London, which also included other New Zealand painters Ralph Hotere, Ted Bullmore, and Gordon Browne. After graduating with a Bachelor of Arts with honours, he taught at schools of art in London before returning to New Zealand in 1968.

He was appointed the director of the National Art Gallery of New Zealand (now the Museum of New Zealand Te Papa Tongarewa) in 1968, while there making purchases of paintings by Colin McCahon, Don Binney and Gordon Walters, before the primacy of their work was established. In 1978 he was appointed government art historian. During his time as director, Day continued painting prolifically and two retrospective exhibitions were held: at the Dunedin Public Art Gallery in 1970 and at The Dowse Art Museum, Lower Hutt, the following year.

Since that time, Melvin Day's paintings have been featured in numerous solo and group exhibitions. A major survey exhibition, Melvin Day – Full Circle was shown at the Wellington City Art Gallery in 1984.

In 1990, Day was encouraged by the New Zealand Portrait Gallery Trust to paint Donald McIntyre. In 2011 Melvin and Oroya Day gifted the portrait of McIntyre to the New Zealand Parliamentary Services.

Melvin Day is considered a scholarly painter. His work engages with various periods of western art history, exploring philosophical as well as formal concerns. In a 1984 review, Ian Wedde described Day's Uccello series as incorporating

"the compositional serialism of Cézanne, the low-key cubism of Braque, perhaps the contemplative lighting of Morandi; sometimes the vertical shafting of planes out of Feininger."

In the 2003 New Year Honours, Day was appointed a Companion of the New Zealand Order of Merit, for services to painting and art history.

In 2004 the major survey exhibition Melvin Day – Continuum was held at City Gallery, Wellington, prior to travelling to Rotorua Museum of Art & History, Rotorua. This was followed in 2005 by Tracing Tasman, which was the inaugural exhibition of the redeveloped Nelson Provincial Museum.

During 2007, Melvin Day collaborated with French writer Frédéric-Yves Jeannet and completed a series of work inspired by Vivaldi'sStabat Mater. In 2008 the works were shown at Millennium Art Gallery, in Blenheim; in 2009 at Whakatane District Museum & Gallery; and in 2011 at the Cathedral of St Paul, Wellington, during Easter celebrations.

In 2009 Day, along with Nigel Brown, Geerda Leenards, and John Walsh travelled to Fiordland, to respond to the landscape which inspired Cook's artist William Hodges. The journey was documented by filmmaker Peta Carey The Waterfall.

Day died in Wellington on 17 January 2016. He had been predeceased by his wife, Oroya, in 2014. An art historian, she was the founding president of the Katherine Mansfield Birthplace Society, and was appointed a Member of the Order of the British Empire, for services to the preservation of local history, in the 1989 New Year Honours.

== Legacy ==
Melvin Day's works are found in many national and international public and private collections including Te Papa Tongarewa, The Dowse Art Museum, the Rotorua Museum of Art & History, the New Zealand Ministry of Foreign Affairs and Trade, the State Services Commission, the Dunedin Public Art Gallery, the Auckland Art Gallery, and the New Zealand Portrait Gallery.
