= Meeanee, New Zealand =

Suburb of Napier, New Zealand

Meeanee
- Suburb of Napier
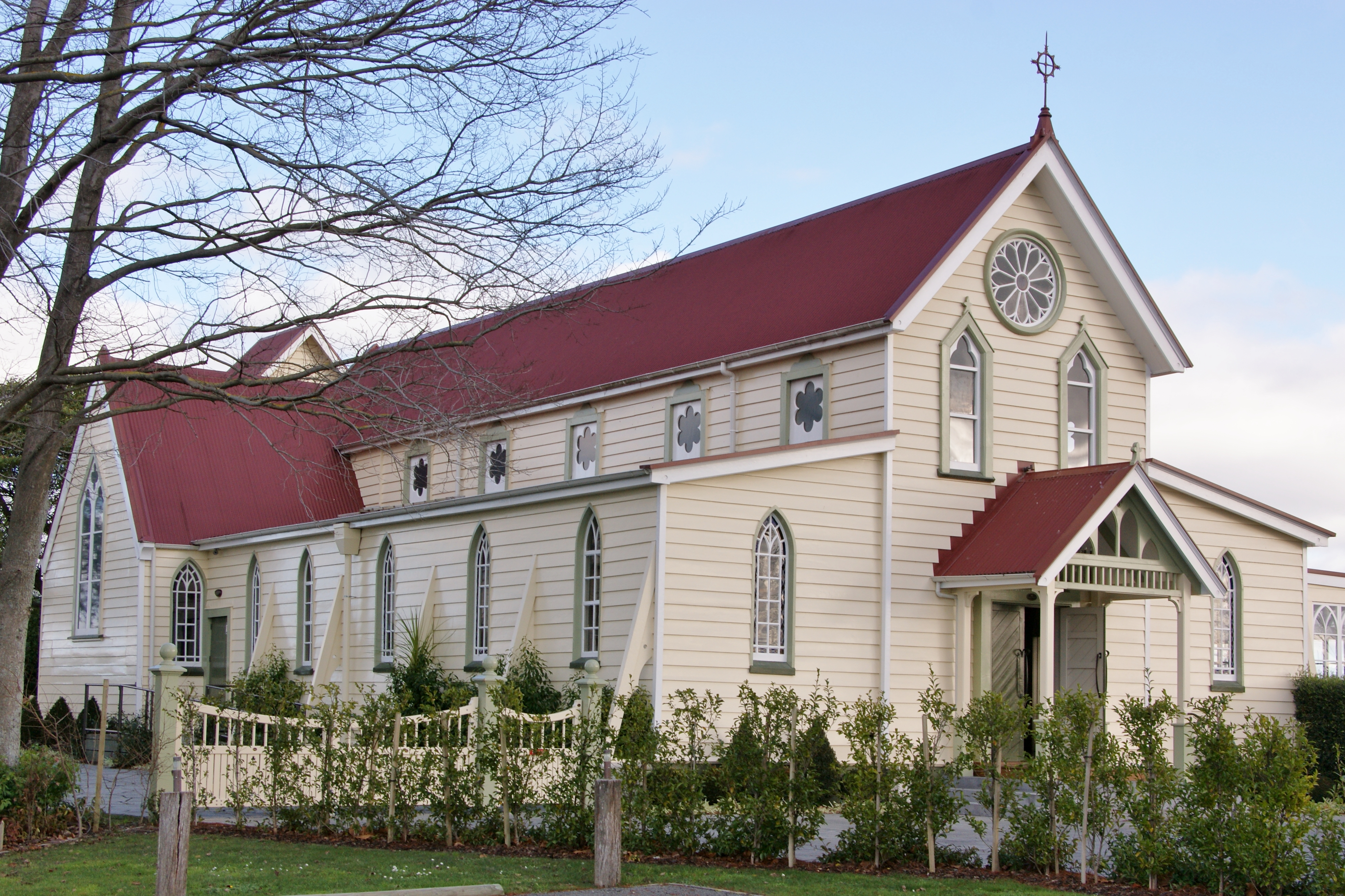
- St. Mary's Church, Meeanee
- Interactive map of Meeanee
- Coordinates: 39.544°S 176.893°E
- Country: New Zealand
- Region: Hawke's Bay
- Territorial authority: Napier City
- Ward: Taradale
- Named for: Battle of Meeanee
- Electorates: Napier; Ikaroa-Rāwhiti (Māori)

Government
  - Territorial Authority: Napier City Council
  - Regional council: Hawke's Bay Regional Council
  - Mayor of Napier: Richard McGrath
  - Napier MP: Katie Nimon
  - Ikaroa-Rāwhiti MP: Cushla Tangaere-Manuel

Area
  - Total: 24.17 km^{2} (9.33 sq mi)
- Elevation: 0–3 m (0.0–9.8 ft)

Population (June 2025)
  - Total: 3,880
  - Density: 161/km^{2} (416/sq mi)
- Time zone: UTC+12 (NZST)
  - Summer (DST): UTC+13 (NZDT)
- Postcode: 4112
- Area Code: 06

Meeanee is a locality south of the city of Napier, in the Hawke's Bay region on the east coast of New Zealand's North Island. It was named after the Battle of Meeanee (now spelled Miani) in India, won by Sir Charles Napier, the city's namesake. It is one of several places in Hawke's Bay, including Clive and Havelock North, that are named after events or people in Colonial India.

== History ==
Meeanee was part of the only route from Napier to Taradale until Taradale Road was built in 1873, and was the site of a Catholic Marist mission station from the 1850s. The priests introduced viticulture to what became the Hawke's Bay wine region, planting several vineyards and establishing the Mission Estate Winery in 1851, New Zealand's oldest surviving winemaking concern. They also built St Mary's Church in 1863, which still stands but is now a privately owned restaurant and event venue.

== Economy ==
Meeanee is located on the flat coastal plain south of Napier, and surrounded by farmland and apple orchards.

== Demographics ==
The statistical area of Meeanee-Awatoto, which includes Awatoto, covers 24.17 km^{2} (9.33 sq mi) and had an estimated population of 3,880 as of June 2025, with a population density of 161 people per km^{2}.

Historical population for Meeanee-Awatoto
Year	Pop.	±% p.a.
2006	1,494	—
2013	1,920	+3.65%
2018	2,529	+5.66%
2023	3,381	+5.98%
The 2006 population is for a larger area of 24.30 km^{2}. Source:

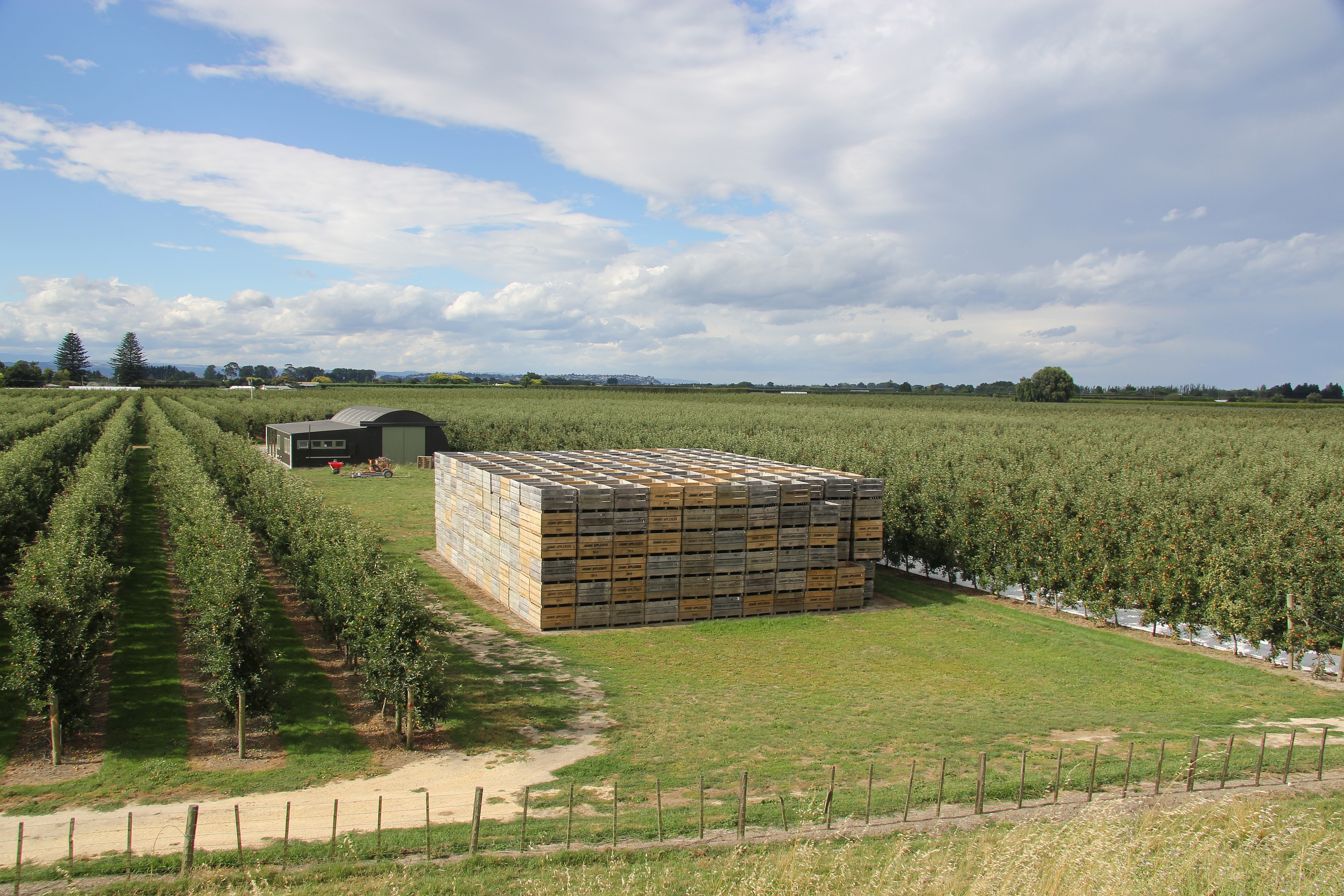
Apple orchard at Meeanee

Meeanee-Awatoto had a population of 3,381 in the 2023 New Zealand census, an increase of 852 people (33.7%) since the 2018 census, and an increase of 1,461 people (76.1%) since the 2013 census. There were 1,701 males, 1,674 females, and 3 people of other genders in 1,281 dwellings. 2.2% of people identified as LGBTIQ+. The median age was 47.3 years (compared with 38.1 years nationally). There were 525 people (15.5%) aged under 15 years, 483 (14.3%) aged 15 to 29, 1,491 (44.1%) aged 30 to 64, and 882 (26.1%) aged 65 or older.

People could identify as more than one ethnicity. The results were 85.1% European (Pākehā); 14.8% Māori; 4.3% Pasifika; 6.6% Asian; 0.9% Middle Eastern, Latin American and African New Zealanders (MELAA); and 3.4% other, which includes people giving their ethnicity as "New Zealander". English was spoken by 97.8%, Māori by 3.5%, Samoan by 1.6%, and other languages by 7.6%. No language could be spoken by 1.5% (e.g. too young to talk). New Zealand Sign Language was known by 0.3%. The percentage of people born overseas was 18.6, compared with 28.8% nationally.

Religious affiliations were 35.1% Christian, 1.0% Hindu, 0.4% Islam, 0.9% Māori religious beliefs, 0.6% Buddhist, 0.4% New Age, and 1.7% other religions. People who answered that they had no religion were 53.5%, and 6.7% of people did not answer the census question.

Of those at least 15 years old, 558 (19.5%) people had a bachelor's or higher degree, 1,632 (57.1%) had a post-high school certificate or diploma, and 669 (23.4%) people exclusively held high school qualifications. The median income was $43,000, compared with $41,500 nationally. 330 people (11.6%) earned over $100,000 compared to 12.1% nationally. The employment status of those at least 15 was 1,425 (49.9%) full-time, 354 (12.4%) part-time, and 51 (1.8%) unemployed.

== Education ==
Meeanee School is a co-educational Year 1-8 state primary school, with a roll of 102 as of July 2026. The school opened in 1865.
