= Rachael Zister =

New Zealand Māori leader (1893–1997)

Rachael Zister CBE
- Born: Rachael Ngeungeu Te Irirangi Beamish; 10 October 1893; Mercer, New Zealand
- Died: 22 May 1997 (aged 103); Ōtāhuhu, New Zealand
- Occupation(s): Māori community leader, secretary

Rachael Ngeungeu Te Irirangi Zister CBE (née Beamish, 10 October 1893 – 22 May 1997) was a New Zealand woman of mana, a secretary and community leader. Of Māori descent, she identified with the Ngāti Tai and Ngāti Paoa iwi. She was born in Waiariki, Waikato, New Zealand in 1893.

In the 1989 New Year Honours, Zister was appointed a Commander of the Order of the British Empire, for services to the Māori people. She was awarded the New Zealand 1990 Commemoration Medal in 1990 and the New Zealand Suffrage Centennial Medal in 1993.
