= Mission Estate Winery =

Winery in Hawke's Bay, New Zealand

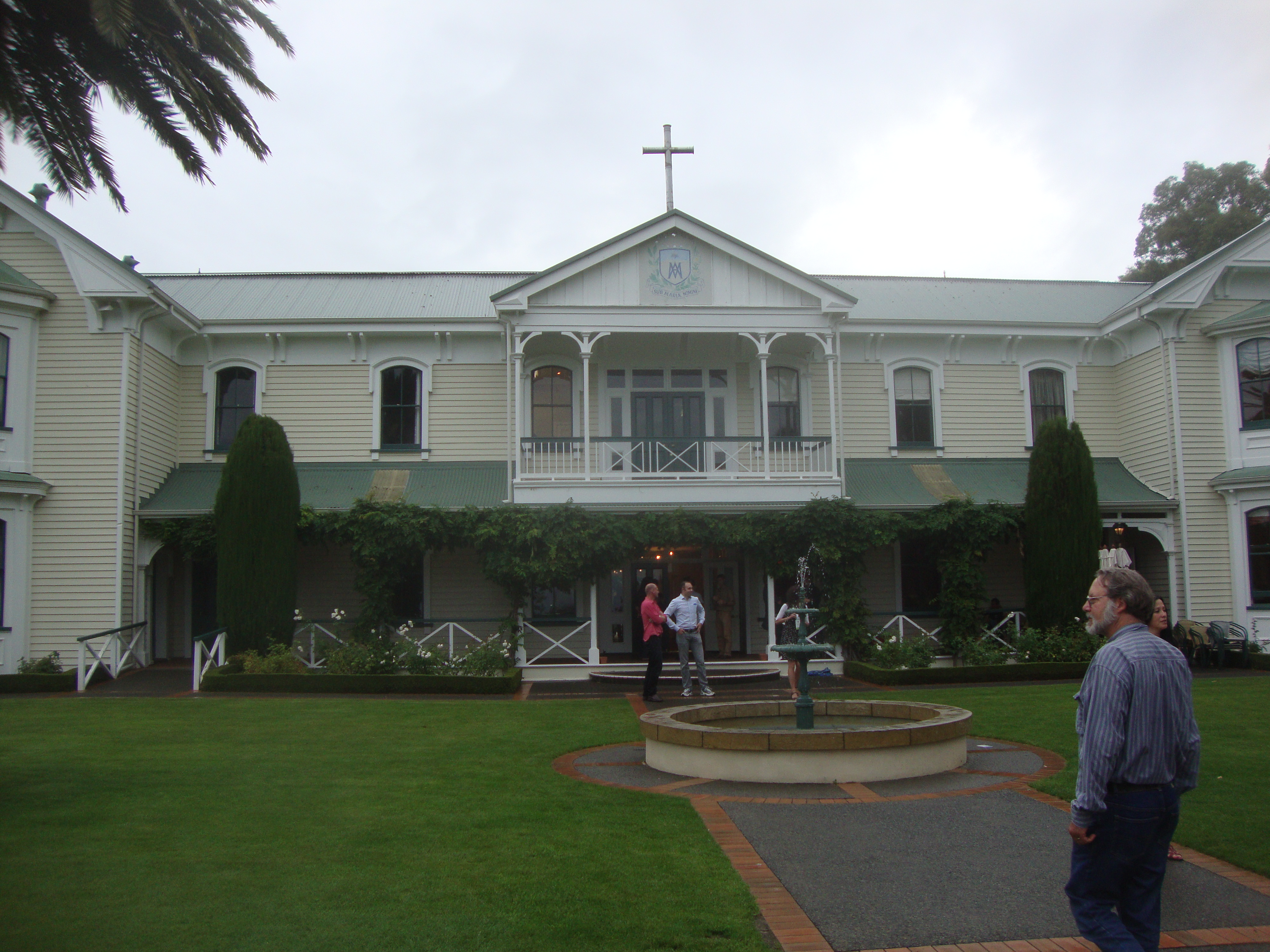
- La Grande Maison, former mission seminary building, built 1880
- Location: Taradale, New Zealand
- Coordinates: 39.5184699°S 176.8426571°E
- Wine region: Hawke's Bay
- Founded: 1851; 175 years ago
- Known for: Jewelstone
- Varietals: Cabernet Sauvignon, Merlot, Syrah, Pinot Noir, Chardonnay, Sauvignon Blanc, Viognier, Sémillon
- Tasting: Open to the public
- Website: Official website

Mission Estate Winery is New Zealand's oldest surviving winemaking concern, first established in the Hawke's Bay in 1851 by French Catholic Marist missionaries for producing sacramental wine. It is one of the largest wineries in the Hawke's Bay and remains wholly New Zealand owned.

== History ==
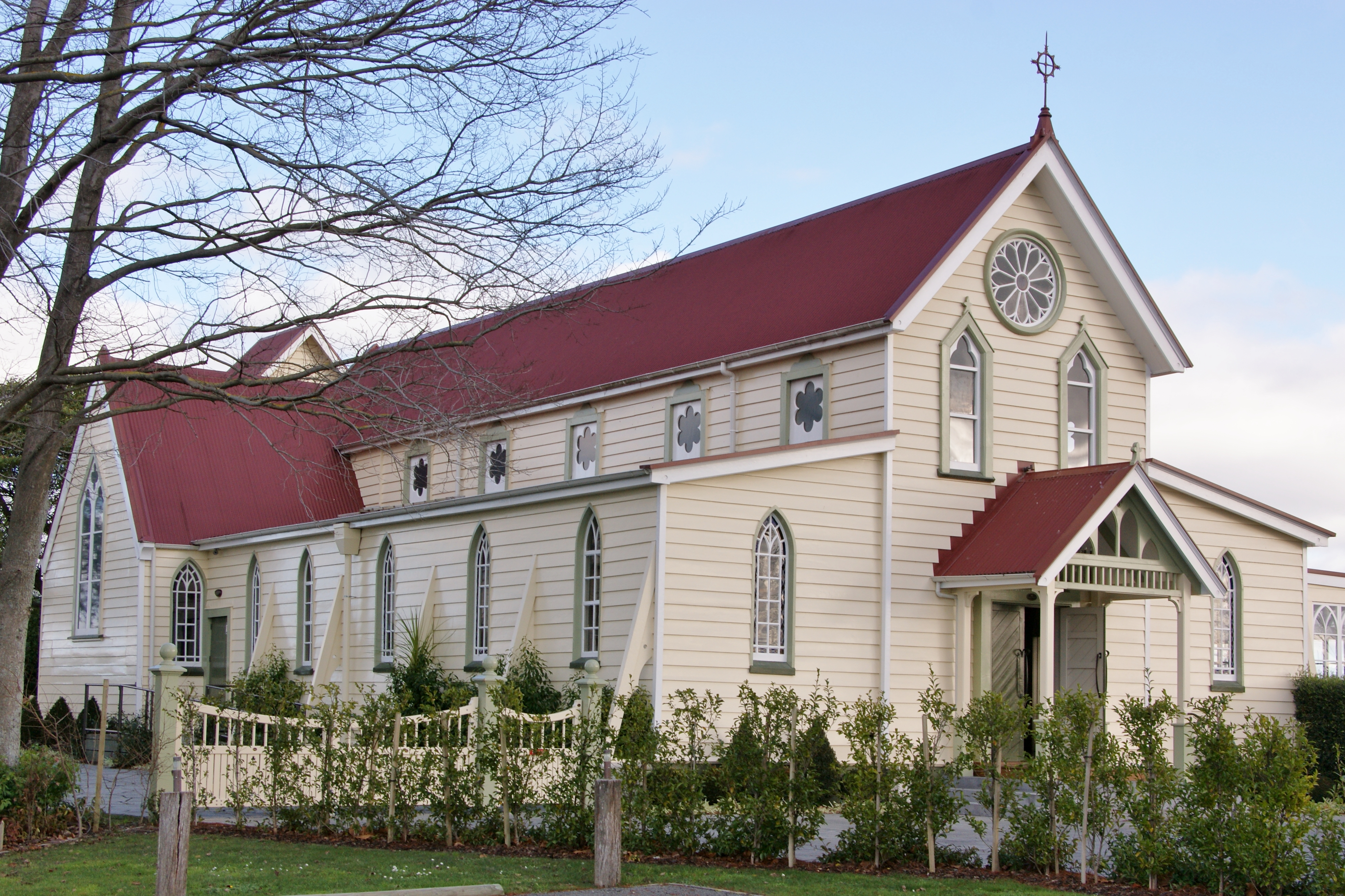
St Mary's Church, built 1863, Meeanee

Marist missionaries, in order to make sacramental wine, were the first to introduce viticulture to the Hawke's Bay Region, planting the first vineyards in 1851 at the original mission station in Pakowhai. The mission moved 5 kilometres (3 miles) north to Meeanee in 1858, taking its cottage with it using steam-powered traction engines, and subsequently building residence halls, a school, and St Mary's Church (built 1863). More vineyards were planted at Meeanee, and the mission recorded its first commercial sale of wines in 1870. In 1880 the mission built its seminary building at Meeanee, the two-storey La Grande Maison (French, "the grand house"), and purchased a large 325-hectare (800-acre) plot of land nearby in Taradale in 1897, where more vineyards were planted. The vines were tended by travelling from Meeanee, however disastrous flooding in 1909 prompted the mission to move its operations to the Taradale location. In 1911 the wooden La Grande Maison building was sawn into 11 separate pieces and transported 5 kilometres (3 miles) to its current location over two days, using traction engines. The 1931 Hawke's Bay earthquake caused extensive damage to the region and the mission estate, including the loss of nine lives when the stone chapel was destroyed.

The early 21st century saw Mission Estate undergo considerable expansion, mirroring the overall expansion of the New Zealand wine industry. New buildings and facilities at Mission Estate were opened in 2007, greatly increasing its wine production capacity. In 2012, Mission Estate purchased 100 hectares (245 acres) of Marlborough vineyards after the Great Recession forced Cape Campbell Wines, the former owner of the land, into receivership. In 2017, Mission Estate took over ownership of founding Bridge Pa Triangle winery Ngatarawa Wines when its owners, Alwyn and Brian Corban (whose family established the Corbans winery), reached retirement age.

== Concerts ==
Following the death of Michael Jackson in 2009, Mission Estate Winery announced their hosting of The Motown Event; a concert featuring various artists of the Motown music era, to take place on February 13, 2010. Featuring various artists such as Jimmy Barnes, The Temptations, The Four Tops, Joan Osborne and Martha Reeves, the concert sold out and was a critical and financial success.
