= Taradale High School =

- Te Haikura o Otatara

Location
- 50 Murphy Road, Taradale, Napier, New Zealand; 39.5424°S 176.8506°E

Information
- Type: State secondary co-educational Years 9–13
- Motto: Piki ake. Kia maia / Be Determined, Aim High
- Established: 1970
- Ministry of Education Institution no.: 215
- Principal: David Oliver
- Enrolment: 1,049 (July 2026)
- Socio-economic decile: 7O
- Website: ths.school.nz

Taradale High School (Māori: Te Haikura o Otatara) is a co-educational secondary school in Taradale (a suburb of the city of Napier in New Zealand). It caters for years 9 to 13 and has an attendance of approximately 1,049 students as of July 2026.

== Facilities ==
The school was originally constructed to the Nelson Two-Storey standard plan, like most New Zealand secondary schools built in the 1960s. The Nelson Two-Storey is distinguished by its two-storey H-shaped classroom blocks, with stairwells at each end of the block and a large ground floor toilet and cloak area on one side.

== History ==
The school opened on 3 February 1970, although some of the buildings were not yet complete or painted, and the playing fields were bare earth with stones and rocks. The science class had no equipment, and the library was short of books. The opening ceremony was not held until 17 July 1970, and the Minister of Education, Brian Talboys, was unable to attend and a replacement speaker was hastily organised. Of the original ten staff members, four left during the first year. Despite these problems, the school presented a concert involving every class at the end of the second term, and a basketball marathon set an endurance record for the Guinness Book of Records. The school magazine, then called Teamhar Leabhar (Gaelic for The Book of Tara), published its first issue.

The school grew rapidly over the next decade. B block was built in 1971–72 and C block in 1975. A mezzanine floor was added to the library in 1974, and the gymnasium opened in 1981. The roll increased to over 800 in 1976 and was then stable until 1984 when it increased to over 900. The school magazine become The Brooch in 1976.

In 1975 the local community decided that the school should have its own Board of Governors in place of the Napier High Schools Board. The school gained the right to internally assess all School Certificate subjects from 1977.

A connection with Tomakomai Commercial High School in Tomakomai, Hokkaidō, Japan, formed in 1979, with several Japanese students spending a year at Taradale. A second sister school relationship was formed with Samil Commercial High School in South Korea in 1993.

The school celebrated its 25th anniversary with a reunion during Easter 1995.

Taradale High School received unfavourable national attention when the head boy, deputy head boy, head of sport, and four fellow pupils anally gangraped an acquaintance with a broomstick coated with muscle relaxant during a party on the evening of 17 October 2001. Six of the students were convicted of sexual assault and sentenced to between 2 and 2.5 years imprisonment.

== Notable alumni ==
- Ross Burden – celebrity chef
- Krysten Cottrell – rugby union player
- Rhiarna Ferris – rugby union player
- Laura Nagel – middle- and long-distance runner

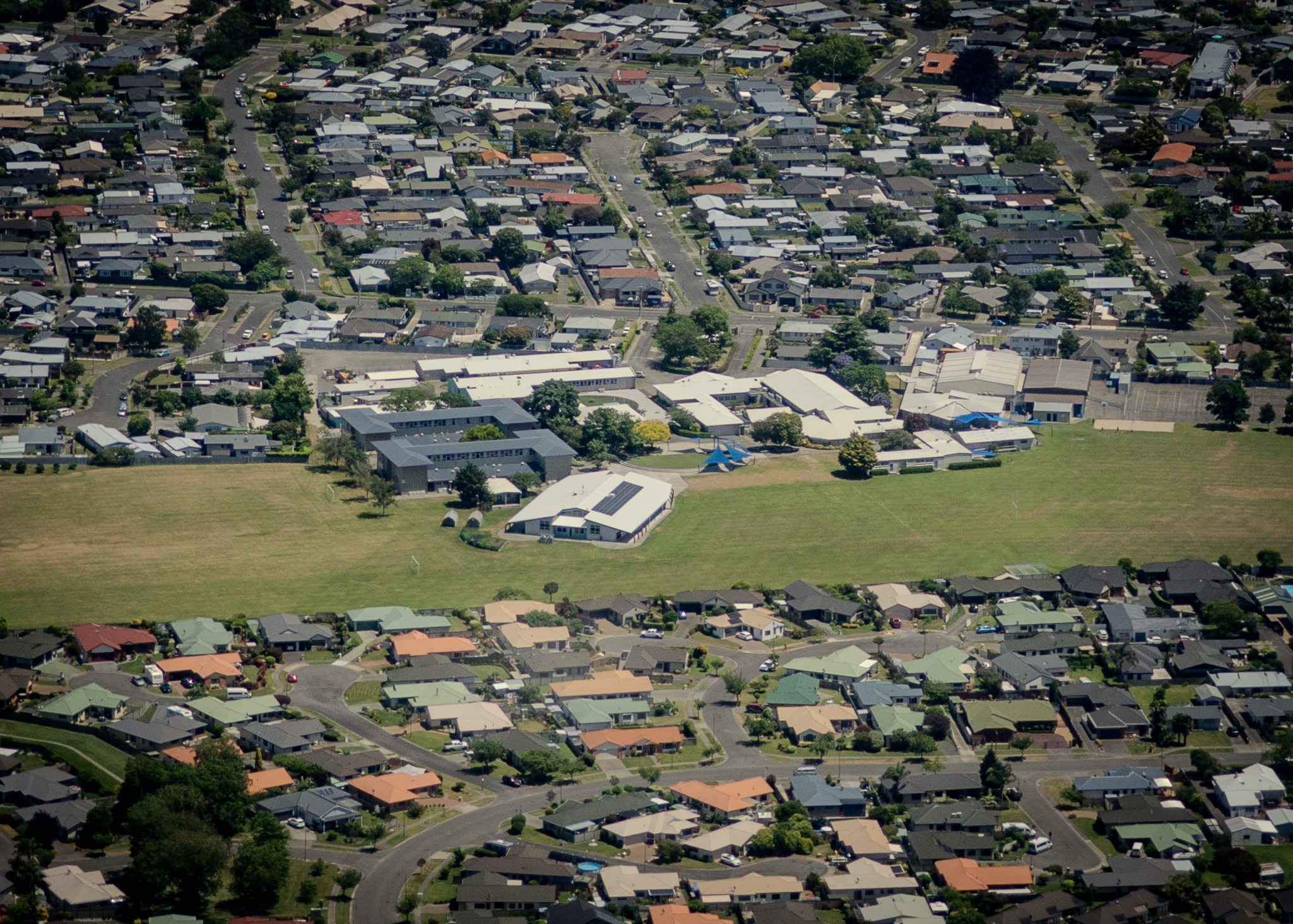
Aerial view of the school.

== Principals ==
#	Name	Term
1	Bob Twaddle	1970–1984
2	Ian Eliffe	1984–1985
3	Michael Kilty	1985–2003
4	John Pitts	2003–2006
5	Stephen Hensman	2006–2019
6	David Oliver	2019–current
