= 1989 New Year Honours (New Zealand) =

Annual awards for New Zealanders

The 1989 New Year Honours in New Zealand were appointments by Elizabeth II on the advice of the New Zealand government to various orders and honours to reward and highlight good works by New Zealanders. The awards celebrated the passing of 1988 and the beginning of 1989, and were announced on 31 December 1988.

The recipients of honours are displayed here as they were styled before their new honour.

== Knight Bachelor ==
- The Venerable Archdeacon Kīngi Matutaera Īhaka MBE JP – of Auckland. For services to the Māori people.
- Dr Robin Orlando Hamilton Irvine – of Dunedin; vice-chancellor, University of Otago.
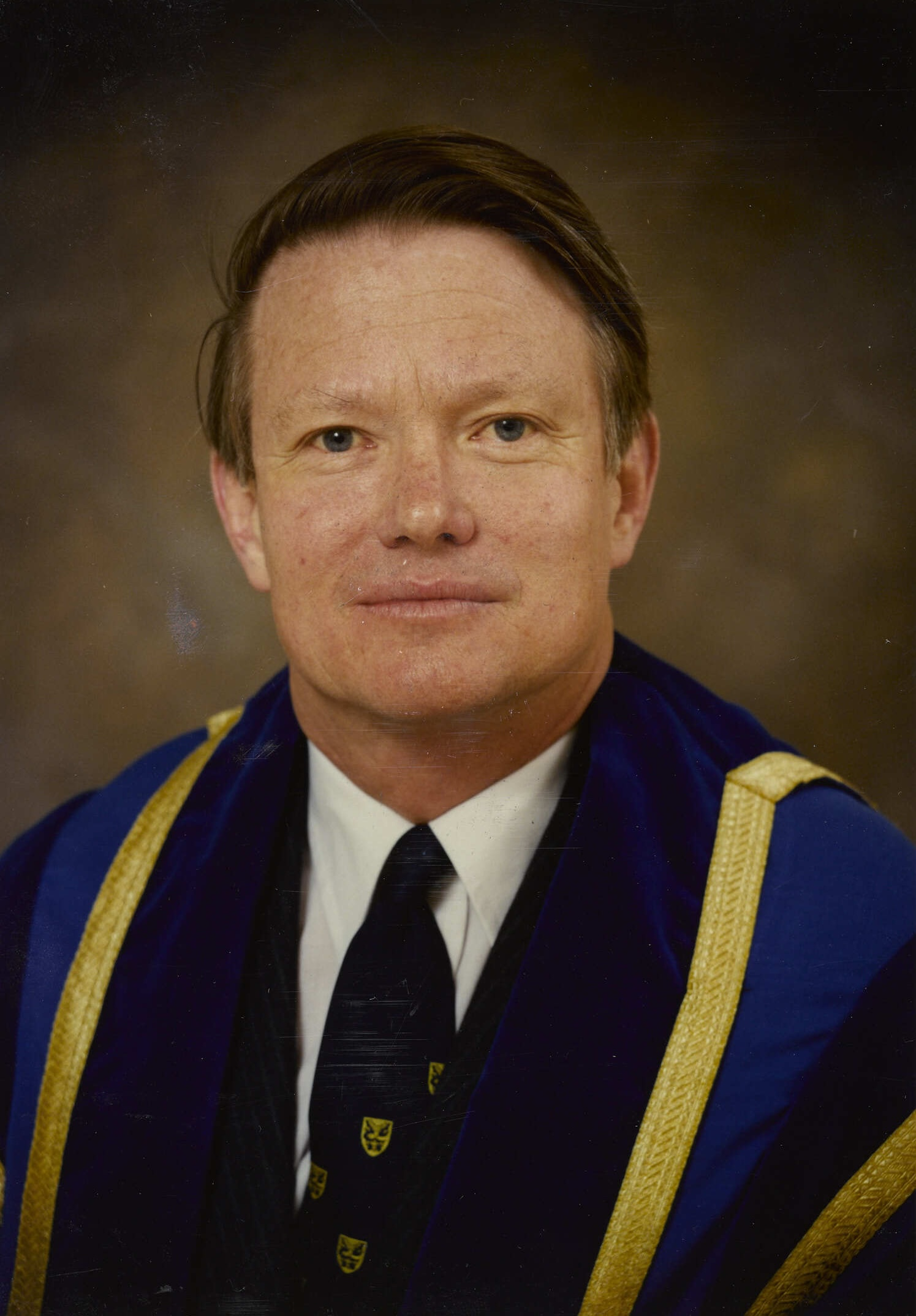
Sir Robin Irvine

== Order of the Bath ==
=== Companion (CB) ===
Military division

- Rear Admiral Douglas Brian Domett CBE – Royal New Zealand Navy; Chief of Naval Staff.

== Order of Saint Michael and Saint George ==
=== Companion (CMG) ===
- Brian Hall Picot – of Auckland. For public and community service.
- Thomas Graeme Shadwell – of Silverstream; lately Commissioner of Works.

== Order of the British Empire ==
=== Dame Commander (DBE) ===
Civil division

- Barbara Goodman QSO JP – of Auckland. For services to the community.
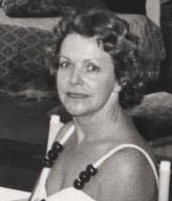
Dame Barbara Goodman

=== Knight Commander (KBE) ===
Civil division

- Roy Allan McKenzie – of Wellington. For services to education and the community.
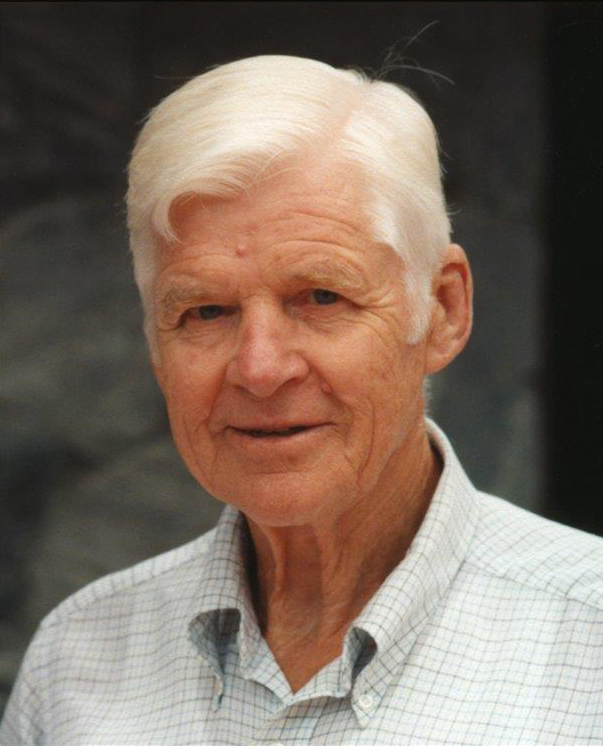
Sir Roy McKenzie

=== Commander (CBE) ===
Civil division

- Professor Donald Ward Beaven – of Christchurch. For services to medicine and the community.
- David Rendel Kingston Gascoigne – of Wellington. For services to the film industry.
- Clutha Nantes Mackenzie OBE JP – of North Canterbury. For services to local government.
- Janetta Mary McStay MBE – of Auckland. For services to music.
- Professor Alan Francis Mark – of Dunedin. For services to conservation.
- Maurice Francis Richard Shadbolt – of Auckland. For services to literature.
- Margaret Mary Timms (Sister Margaret Timms) – of Auckland. For services to the hospice movement.
- Douglas Owen Walker OBE JP – of Auckland. For services to business management and the community.
- Rachael Ngeungeu Te Irirangi Beamish Zister JP – of Clevedon. For services to the Māori people.

Military division

- Brigadier Raymond John Andrews OBE – Brigadiers' List, New Zealand Army.
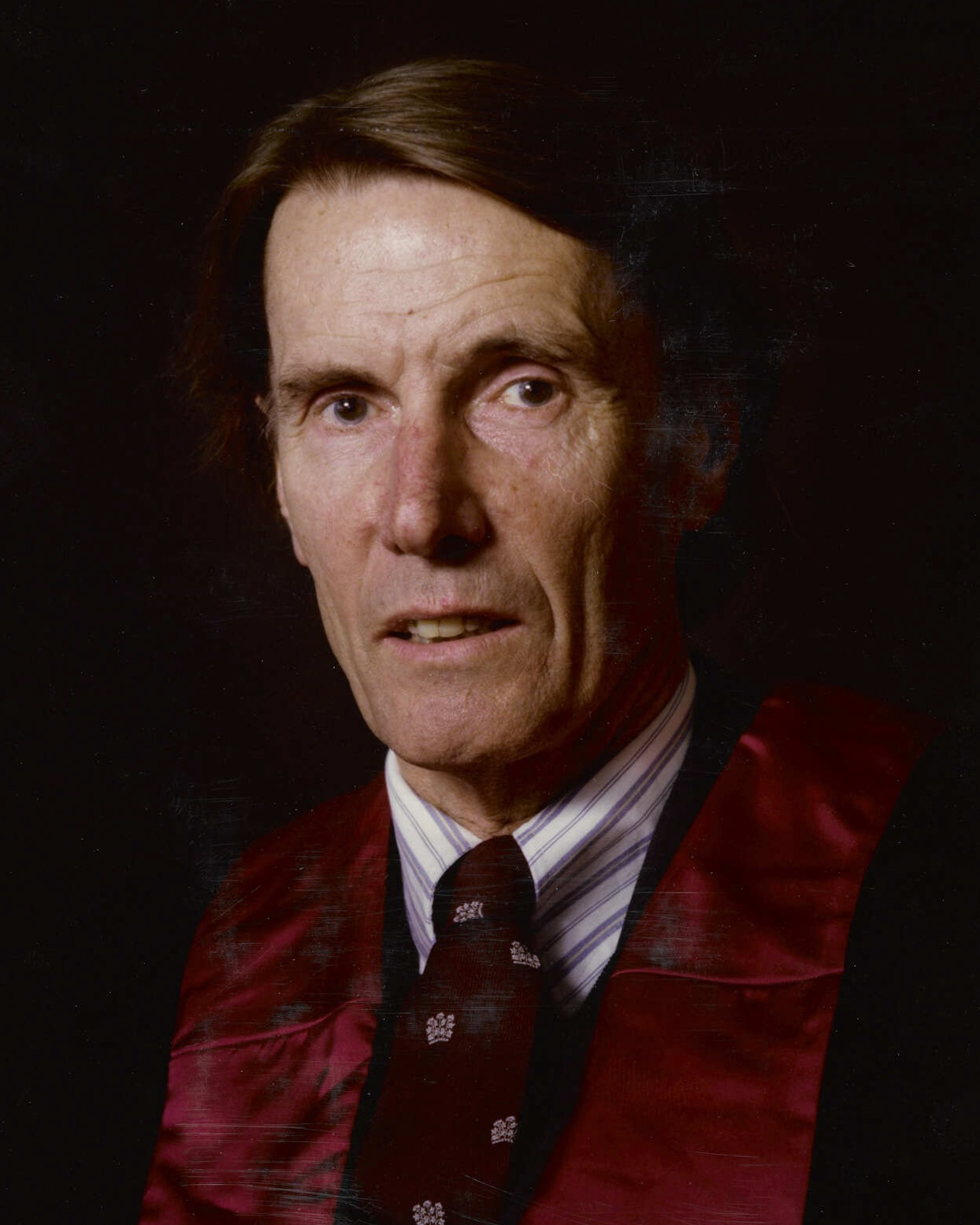
Don Beaven

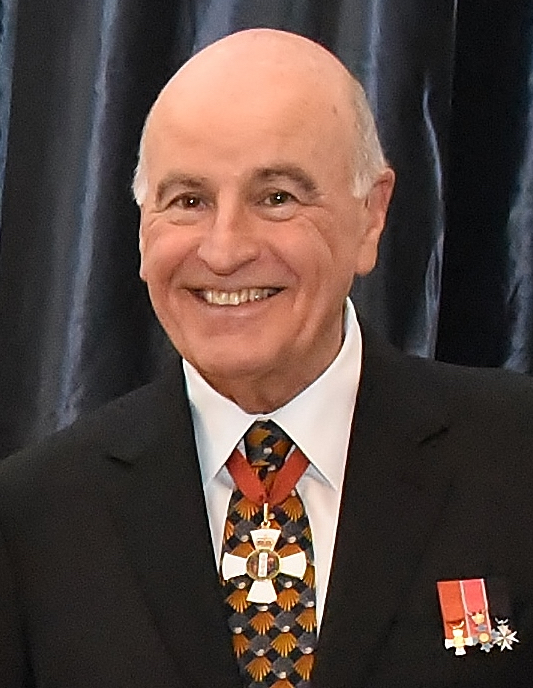
David Gascoigne

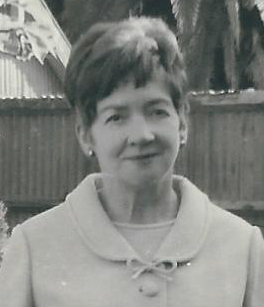
Janetta McStay

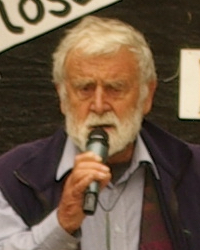
Alan Mark

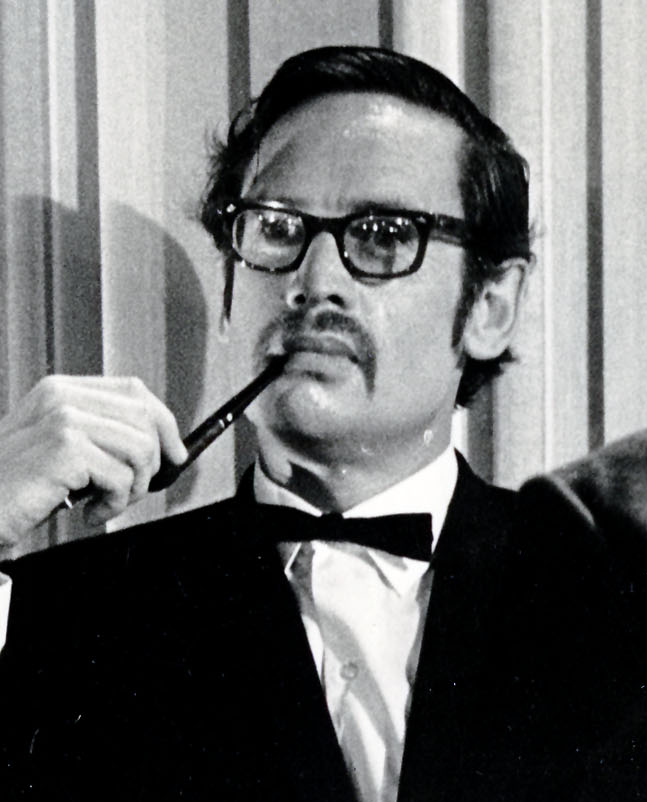
Maurice Shadbolt

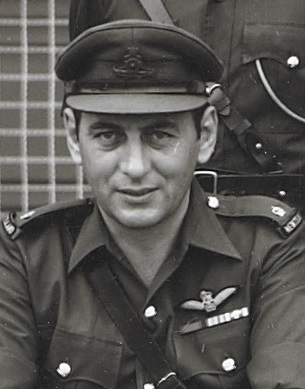
Ray Andrews

=== Officer (OBE) ===
Civil division

- William Harold Bongard – of Tauranga. For services to education.
- James Alexander Boomer – of Nelson. For services to the trade-union movement.
- Leslie Thomas Bradshaw – of Dunedin. For services to athletics.
- Gordon Charles Burgess – of Auckland. For services to cricket.
- Lillian Jessie Chrystall – of Auckland. For public services.
- Sharon Margaret Crosbie – of Wellington. For services to broadcasting.
- Sidney Murray Hurst – of Oamaru. For services to agriculture and education,
- Bernard Kelly – of New Plymouth. For services to racing.
- Dr Derek Alexander Larnder – of Christchurch. For services to dermatology.
- Dr James Connell Marshall – of Christchurch. For services to the intellectually handicapped.
- Ivan Gerald Mauger MBE – of Runaway Island, Queensland, Australia. For services to speedway sport.
- Frederick Kenneth McInerney – of Dannevirke; lately chief executive, Telecom Corporation of New Zealand.
- Brian Spencer Mooney – assistant commissioner, New Zealand Police.
- Professor Jane Ritchie – of Hamilton. For services to women, education and the community.
- Leslie John Raymond Tucker – of Hastings. For services to local government.

Military division

- Colonel Graeme William Talbot – Colonels' List, New Zealand Army.
- Group Captain (now Air Commodore) John Stuart Hosie – Royal New Zealand Air Force.
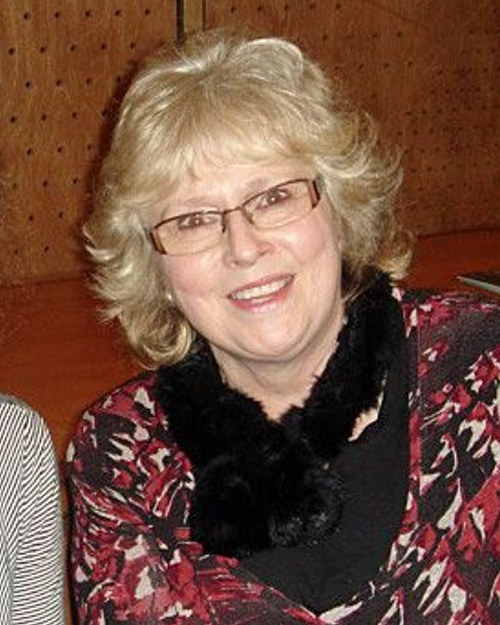
Sharon Crosbie

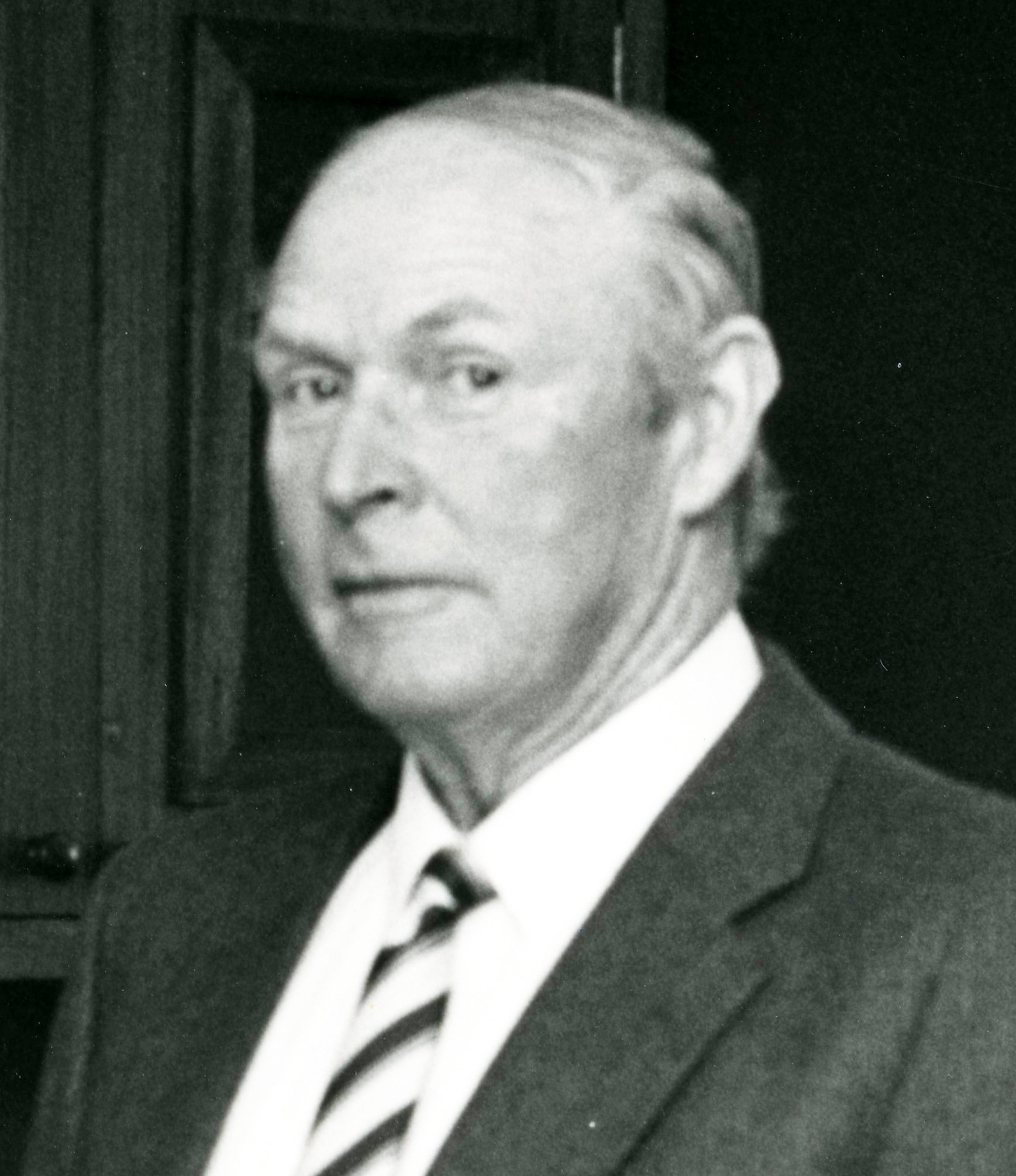
Sid Hurst

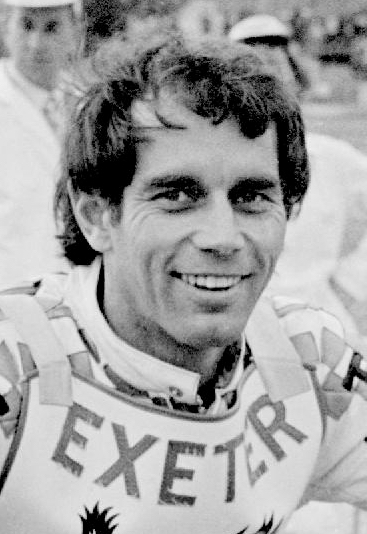
Ivan Mauger

=== Member (MBE) ===
Civil division

- Douglas Frank Bond – of New Plymouth. For services to cycling.
- Dr Kathleen Audrey Bradford – of Nelson. For services to medicine and the community.
- Seton William Clare – of Gisborne. For services to local government.
- Ivan David Cox – of Auckland. For services to returned servicemen.
- Oroya Day – of Wellington. For services to the preservation of local history.
- Clodagh May Flynn – of Foxton. For services to the community.
- Leonard Fortune – of Picton. For services to industrial relations.
- Leslie Alexander Hine – of Wanganui; lately superintendent, Auckland Maximum Security Prison, Department of Justice.
- Trevor Milton Inch – of Rangiora. For services to local government.
- Diedre Allison Irons – of Wellington. For services to music.
- John James Patrick Kirwan – of Auckland. For services to rugby.
- Heather McCrostie Little JP – of Hawarden. For services to local government and the community.
- Patrick Macaskill – of Wellington. For services to education and the community.
- Royce Peter McGlashen – of Nelson. For services to pottery.
- Colin Francis Alexander McLennan – of Paraparaumu. For services to welfare work.
- Dr James Ng – of Dunedin. For services to the community.
- Noela Olwyn Page – of Tauranga. For services to local government and the community.
- Ramesh Bhai Patel – of Auckland. For services to the Indian community.
- Roy Clevedon Purdon – of Takanini. For services to harness racing.
- John Goodwin Smith – of Auckland. For services to the construction industry.
- The Reverend Dr David Garth Stewart – of Auckland. For services to religious studies.
- Ronald William Ward – of Taradale. For services to outdoor education and the community.
- Peter Roy Warnock JP – of Wanganui. For services to the community.

Military division

- Lieutenant Commander Gerrard Owen Harvey – Royal New Zealand Navy.
- Warrant Officer Radio Supervisor Paul Murray – Royal New Zealand Navy.
- Warrant Officer Class 1 Robert Arthur Davies – Royal New Zealand Infantry Regiment.
- Warrant Officer Kevin Charles Faulkner – Royal New Zealand Air Force.
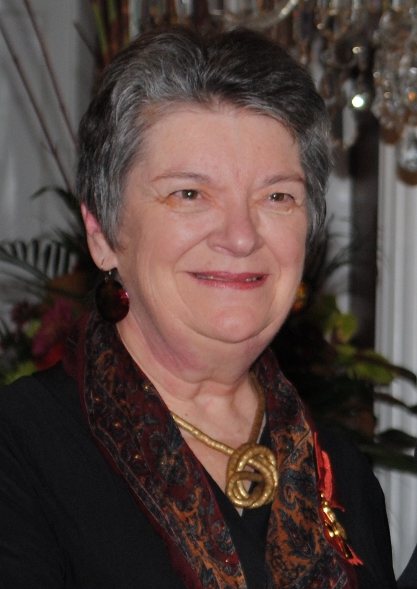
Diedre Irons

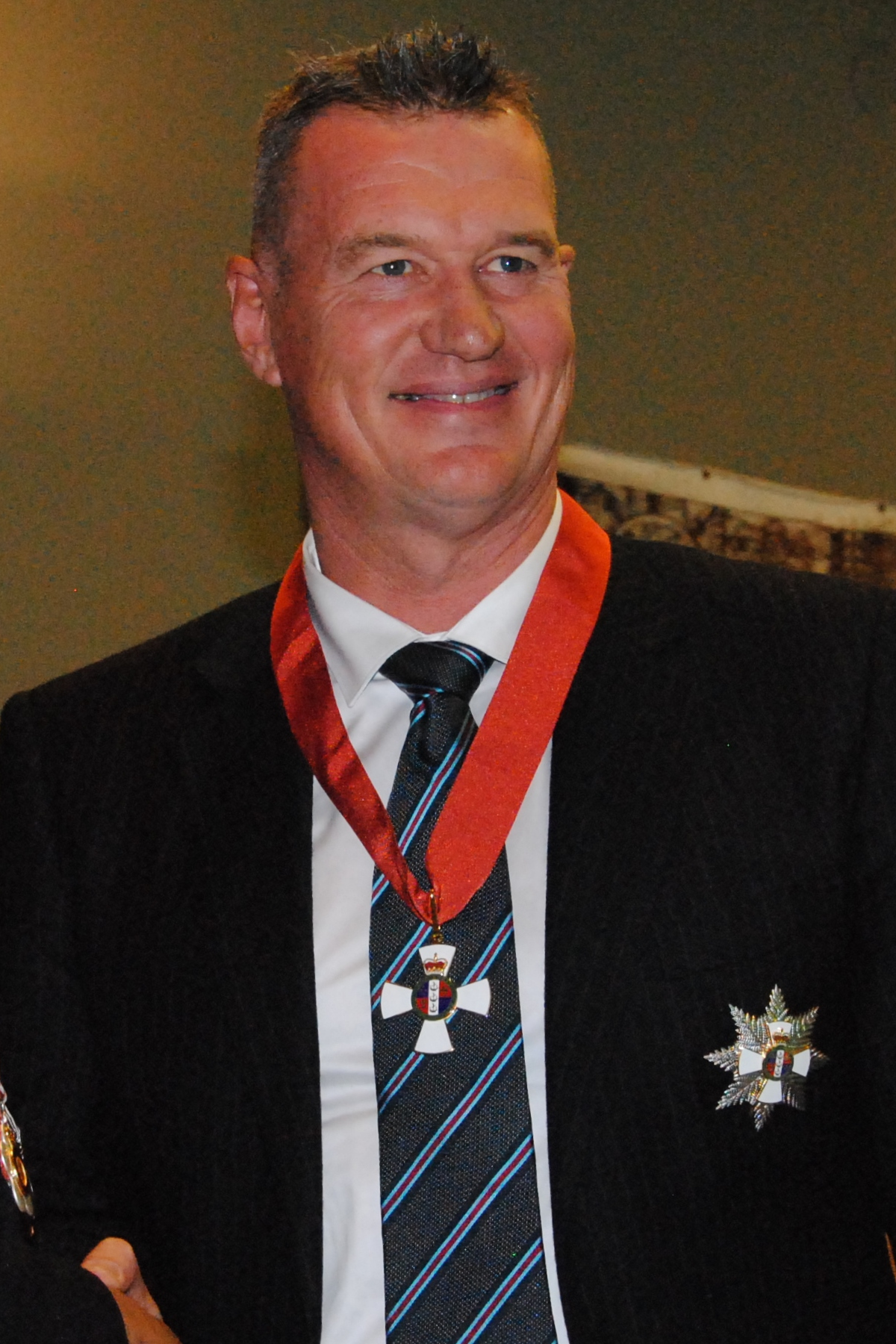
John Kirwan

== Companion of the Queen's Service Order (QSO) ==
=== For community service ===
- James Francis Keenan JP – of Hokitika.
- Ian Hamilton Kilgour – of Auckland.
- Georgina Kamiria Kirby JP – of Auckland.
- Frank Donald Robson – of Taradale.
- Brenda Marie Sampson – of Wellington.
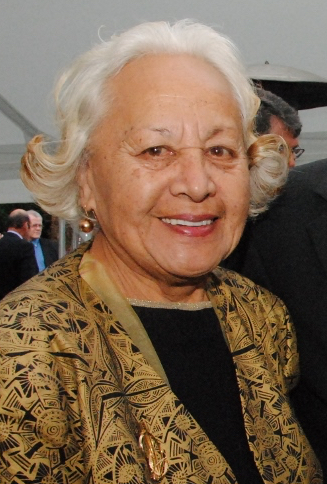
Georgina Kirby

=== For public services ===
- Jacqueline Nancy Mary Adams – of Wellington; lately scientist, National Museum.
- Emeritus Professor John Alexander Asher – of Auckland.
- Janet Mary Clews JP – of Auckland.
- Dr Robert Graham Gudex – of Hamilton.
- Ronald Albert Kelly – of Lower Hutt; lately director-general and chairman, Housing Corporation of New Zealand.
- Roderick Macalister Miller – of Waikanae.
- The Right Honourable Alfred Morris MP – of London, United Kingdom.
- John Simcock – of Upper Hutt; lately Commissioner of Inland Revenue.
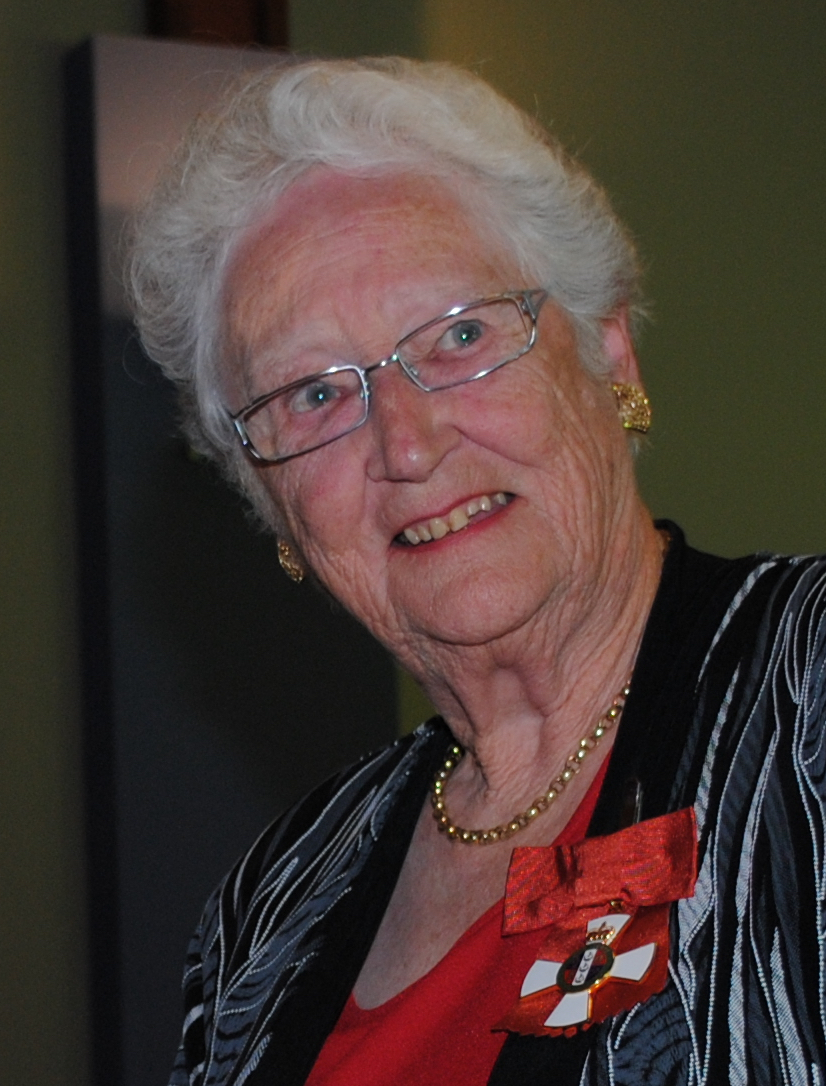
Janet Clews

== Queen's Service Medal (QSM) ==
=== For community service ===
- Donald Stoneham Bergin – of Auckland.
- Edwin Thomas Brownlee – of Christchurch.
- Enid Annie Evans – of Auckland.
- Joyce Lilian Farmiloe – of Auckland.
- John Barry Fenton – of Auckland.
- Bridget Madge Isabel Francois – of Nelson.
- Major Marjory Jack Hardcastle NZWRAC (Retd) – of Lower Hutt.
- Nola Winifred Harrington – of Christchurch.
- Joseph Oscar Hattersley – of Christchurch.
- Carol Mary Hayward – of Christchurch.
- Ida Winifred Henderson – of Dunedin.
- Daphne Doreen Hunt – of Foxton.
- Harry Morgan Lewis JP – of Auckland.
- Beryl Doris Lyle – of Gisborne.
- Valerie Joan Minn – of Wellington.
- Frederick Ronald (Jack) Moore – of Lower Hutt.
- Dorothy Kate Mouat – of Christchurch.
- Margery Lois Moyse – of Christchurch.
- Christopher Michael Pickett – of Auckland.
- Mikolaj Jan Stanislaw (Nick) Polaczuk – of Lower Hutt.
- Trevor Lawson Richards – of Wellington.
- Mary Ethna Lockwood Roper – of Auckland.
- Keith Fraser Scott – of Featherston.
- Boyce Simiona – of Tokoroa.
- Betty May Stanley – of Lyttelton.
- Dawn Noeline (Donna) Sullivan – of Whangārei.
- Hugh Henry Thomas Sweeny – of Napier.
- George Noel Thorne – of Ōpōtiki.
- Wairata Walker – of Ōpōtiki.
- Dan Wilkinson – of New Plymouth.

=== For public services ===
- Colin Herbert Archer – of Wellington.
- Allan Ward Beck – of Eltham.
- Joyce Bell – of Paihia.
- Graham Reeves Bracey – sergeant, New Zealand Police.
- Arthur Ernest Budd JP – of Oamaru.
- John Chirnside JP – of Christchurch.
- George James Christie – of Paremata.
- Alan James Crowther – of Christchurch.
- Gordon Lee Dine – of Māhia Beach.
- Edith Margaret Dovell – of Thames.
- Raymond Philip Edward Ellis – of Auckland.
- Harry Charles Evison – of Christchurch.
- John Alexander Gray – of Wellington.
- Ronald Stephen Francis Halpin – lately senior sergeant, New Zealand Police.
- James Alexander Hopa – of Geraldine.
- Colin Clyde McCready – of Christchurch.
- Bernard Trevor Matthews – of Norwich, Norfolk, United Kingdom.
- Mary Merekatohau Mita – of Murupara.
- Mary Rei Preston-Thomas – of Rotorua; principal nurse, Queen Elizabeth Hospital, Rotorua.
- James Alexander Price JP – of Tītahi Bay.
- Kenneth Allan Richards – of Petone.
- Peter Murray Robinson – of Auckland.
- Juliet Christina Ryan – of Auckland.
- Jennifer Mary Seddon – of Tauranga.
- Howard Leslie Shadbolt – of Christchurch.
- Ian Alfred Shaw JP – of Auckland.
- Iain Archibald Simpson – of Taumarunui.
- John William Stewart JP – of Papatoetoe.
- Margaret Rosemary Swarbrick – of Te Awamutu.
- Robert Owen Vaile – of Te Awamutu.
- David Costello Vallely JP – of Wanganui.
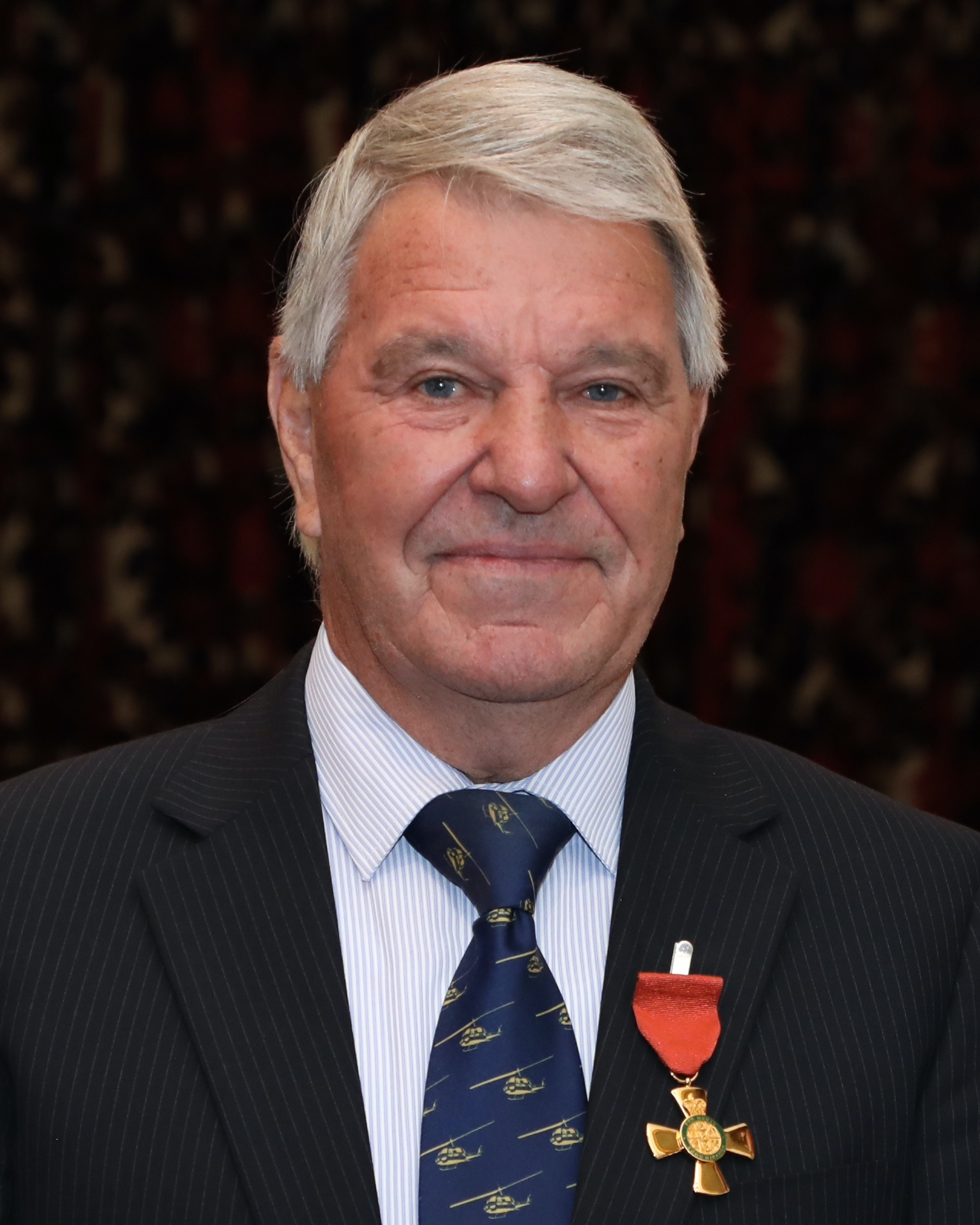
Allan Beck

== Royal Red Cross ==
=== Member (RRC) ===
- Lieutenant Colonel Thursa Margaret Kennedy – Royal New Zealand Nursing Corps.

== Queen's Fire Service Medal (QFSM) ==
- Ernest Barry Bridges – chief fire officer, Blenheim Volunteer Brigade, New Zealand Fire Service.
- Evan John Carroll – chief fire officer, Eastbourne Brigade, New Zealand Fire Service.
- Clifford John Garrett – senior station officer, Ravensbourne Volunteer Brigade, New Zealand Fire Service.
- Ronald Harry Hartley Smith – fire force commander, No. 3 Region, Palmerston North, New Zealand Fire Service.

== Queen's Police Medal (QPM) ==
- Ian Edward Robson – detective sergeant, New Zealand Police.

== Air Force Medal (AFM) ==
- Sergeant Helicopter Crewman John Austin Bray – Royal New Zealand Air Force.
