= Oroya Day =

New Zealand art historian (1931–2014)

Oroya Day MBE
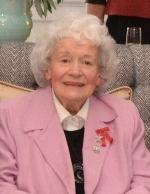
- Born: 14 March 1931
- Died: 26 August 2014; Wellington
- Awards: Member of the Order of the British Empire

Academic work
- Institutions: Victoria University of Wellington

Oroya Day MBE (née McAuley, 14 March 1931 – 26 August 2014) was a New Zealand art historian and academic, and was a lecturer at the Victoria University of Wellington. Day was a founding member and trustee of the Wellington Civic Trust, a life member of the New Zealand Historic Places Trust, and founder and president of the Katherine Mansfield Birthplace Society. In 1989 Day was appointed as a Member of the Most Excellent Order of the British Empire for services to the preservation of local history.

== Early life and education ==
Day was born in Christchurch on 14 March 1931 as Oroya McAuley. Her father was an accountant for New Zealand Railways. She attended St Mary's College in Wellington, and at the age of 21 married artist and art historian Melvin Day in Rotorua, against the wishes of her father. The couple travelled to London for Melvin to attend the Cortauld Institute of Art. Day earned a Diploma in Art History at the University of London in 1968.

== Academic career ==
Day lectured at the Walthamstow School of Art in London, and then taught art history at Victoria University of Wellington. She was the Chairperson of the Wellington Regional Committee of the Historic Places Trust from 1976 to 1978, and both a board member and a life member of the New Zealand Historic Places Trust.

Day was a founding member and trustee of the Wellington Civic Trust in 1981, and founder and inaugural president of the Katherine Mansfield Birthplace Society, established in 1986. She is described as "the driving force" behind the society, and was responsible for the purchase and restoration of the house, Katherine Mansfield's childhood home.

Day died in August 2014, aged 83, survived by her husband.

== Honours and awards ==
In the 1989 New Year Honours, Day was appointed a Member of the Most Excellent Order of the British Empire for services to the preservation of local history.
