= Taradale, New Zealand =

Suburb of Napier, New Zealand

Taradale
- Suburb
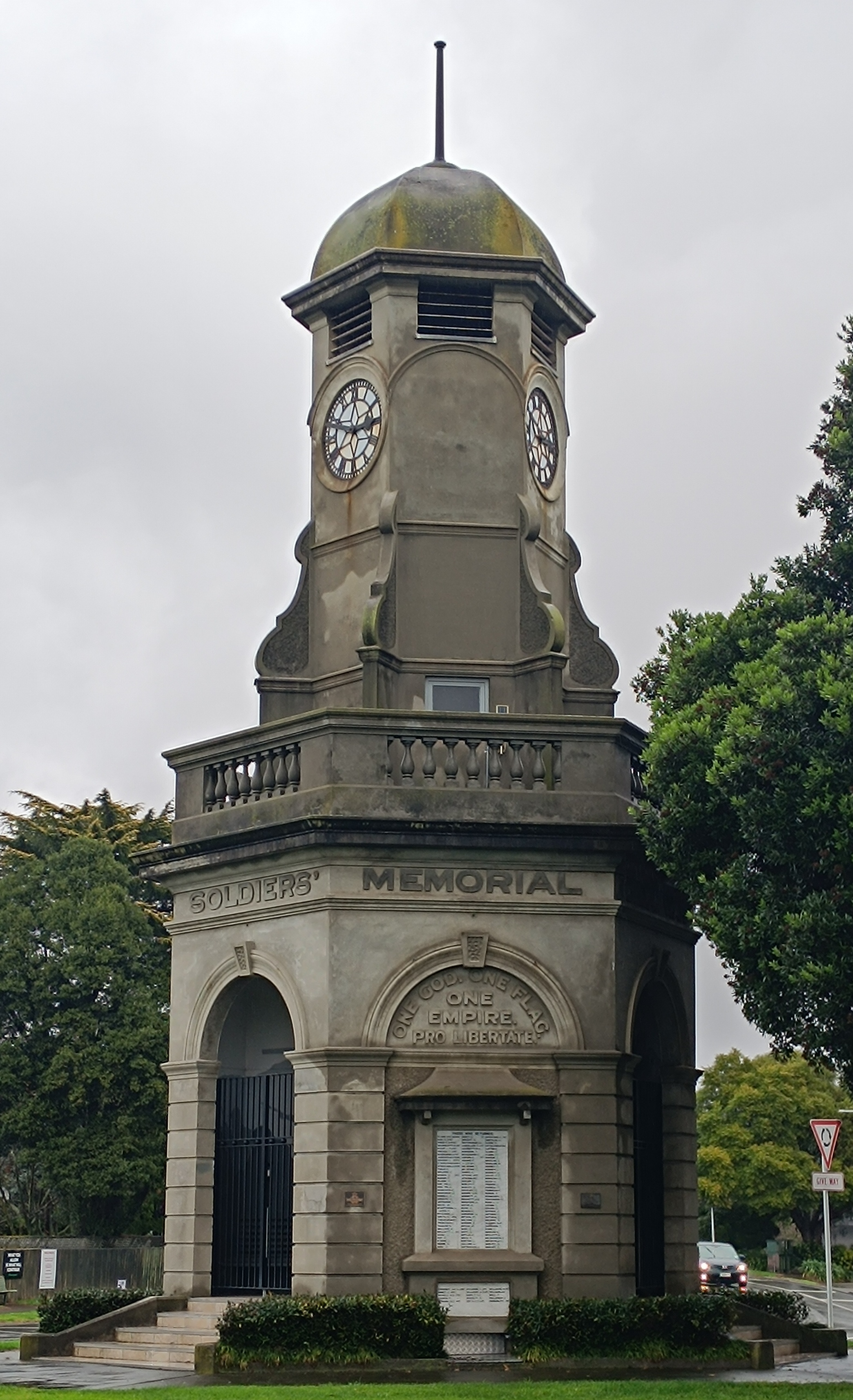
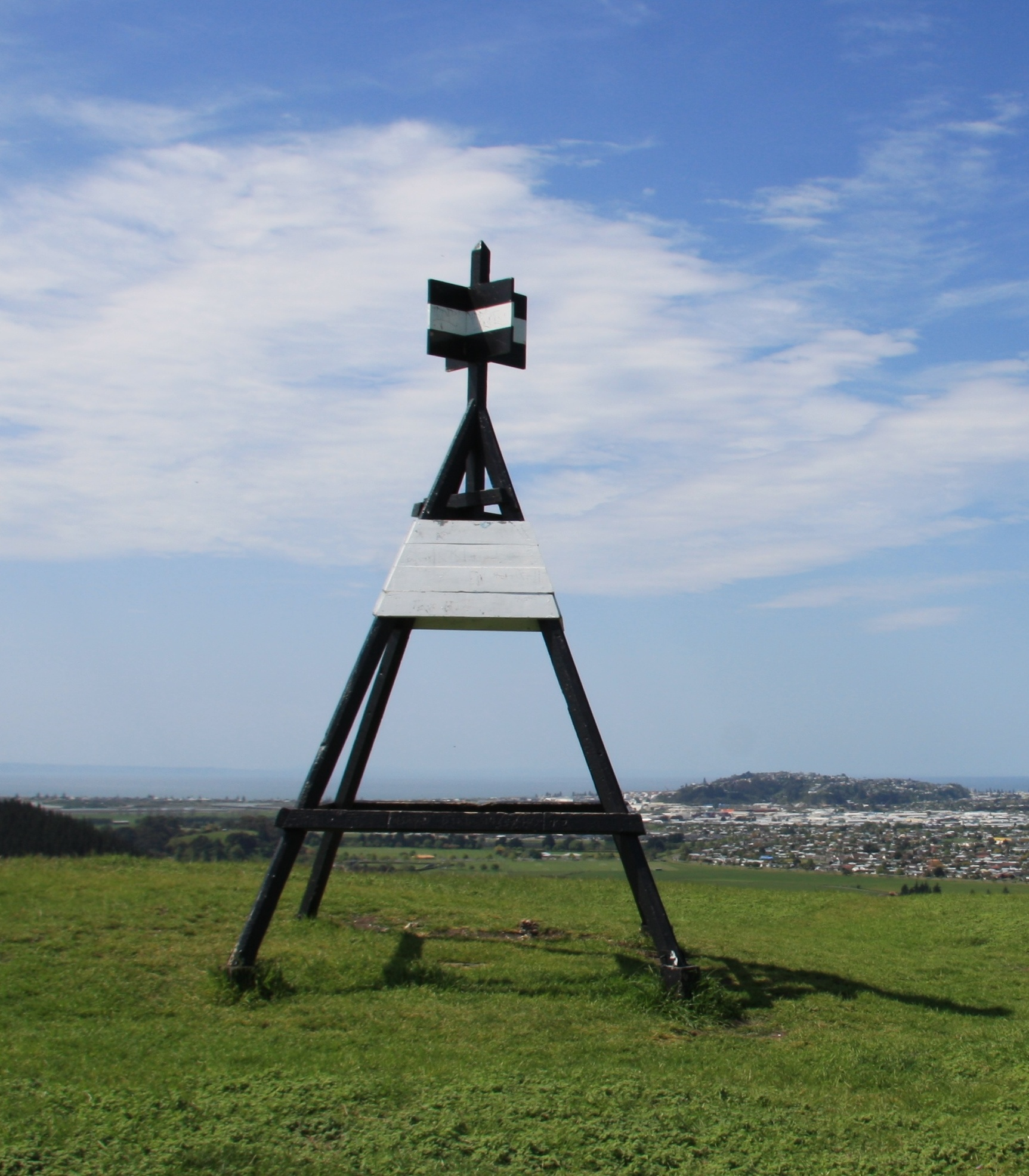
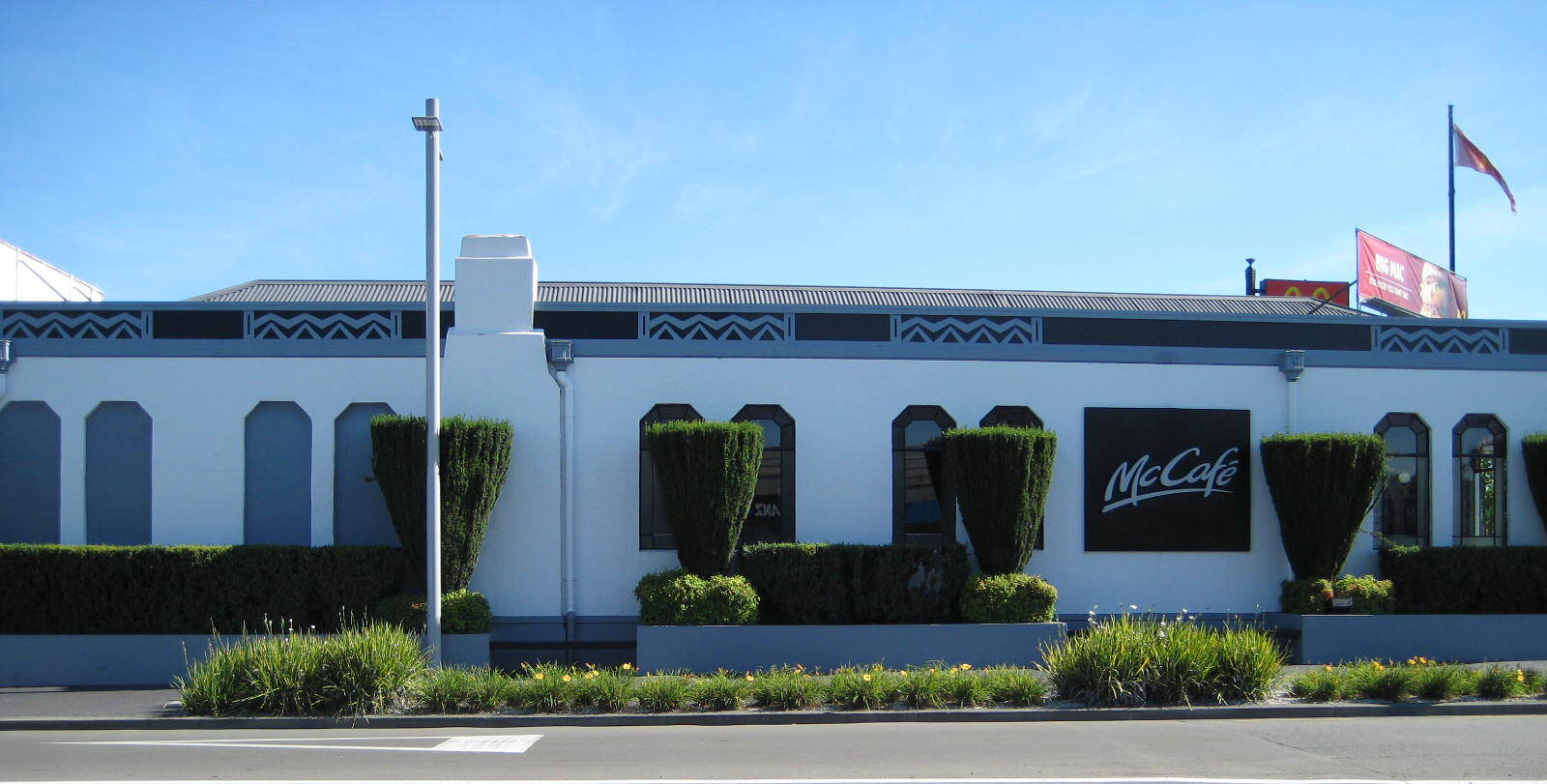
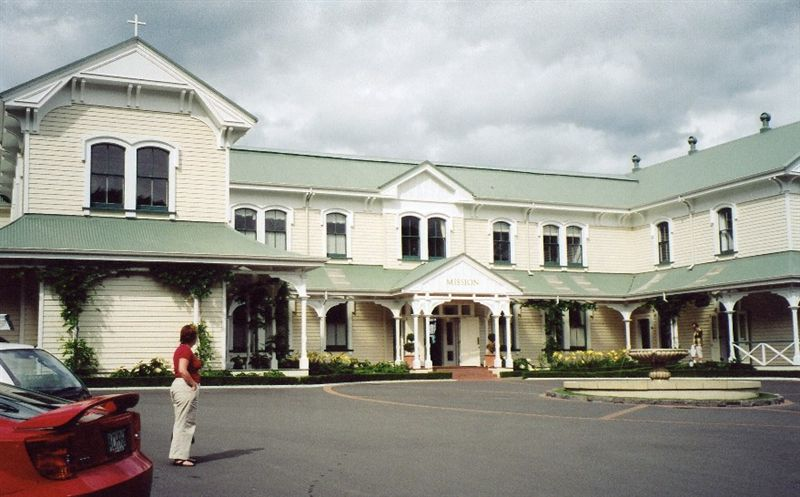
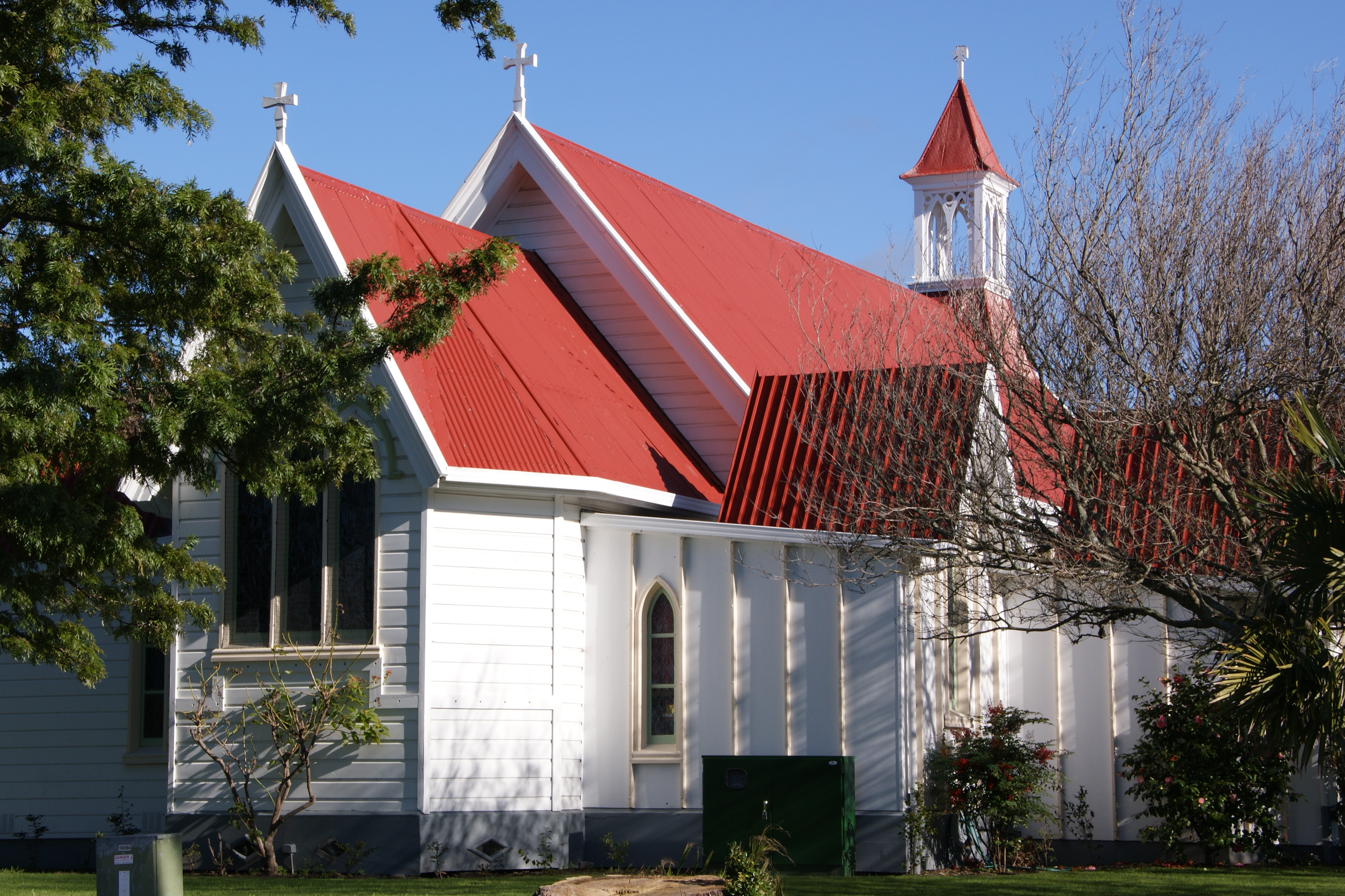
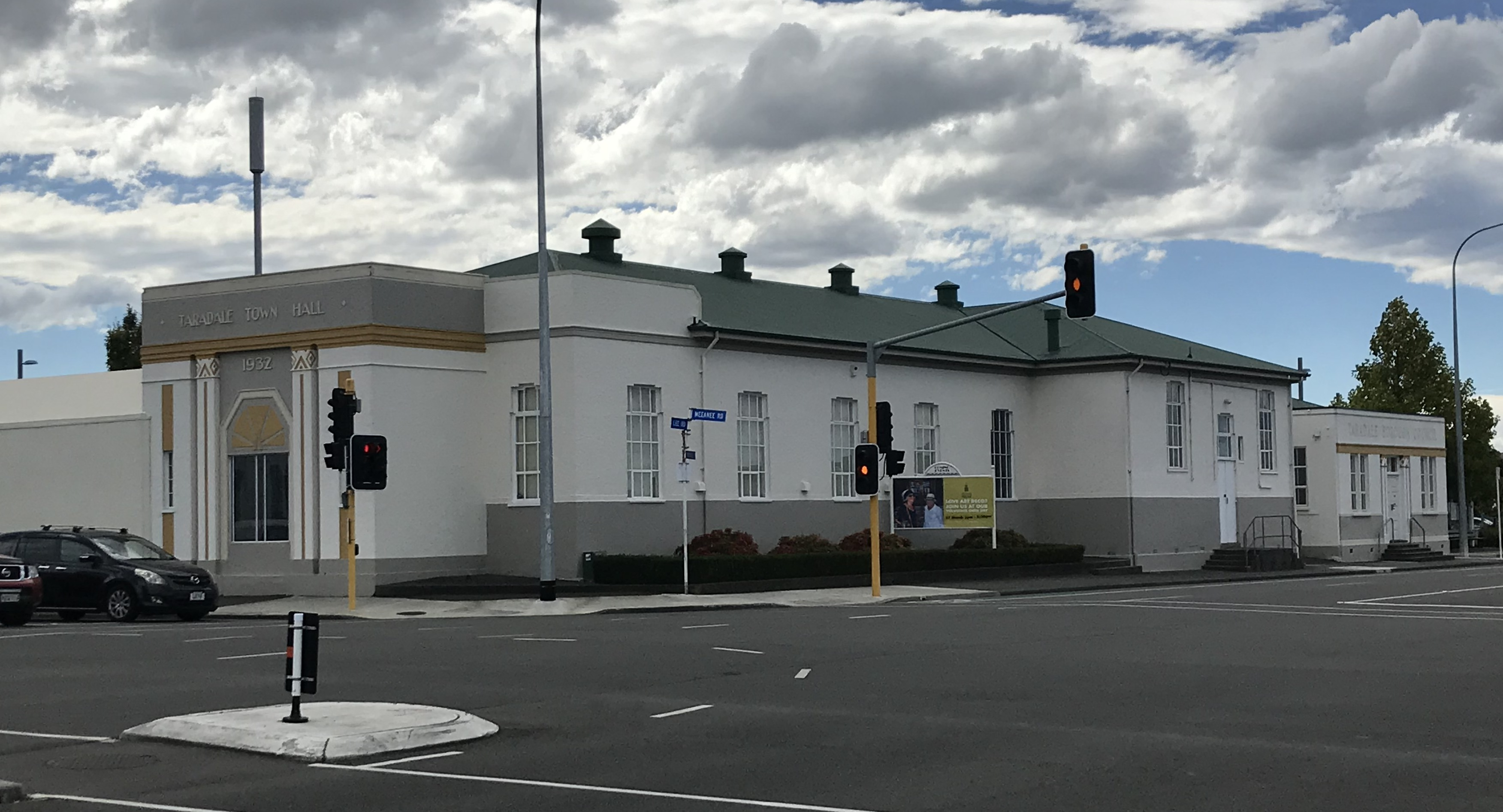
- From top, left to right: War memorial clock tower, trig point atop Sugar Loaf, former Taradale Hotel, Mission Estate, All Saint's Church, Old Town Hall
- Interactive map of Taradale
- Coordinates: 39°32′S 176°51′E
- Country: New Zealand
- City: Napier
- Local authority: Napier City Council
- Electoral ward: Taradale Ward

Area
  - Land: 1,063 ha (2,630 acres)

Population (June 2025)
  - Total: 12,910
  - Density: 1,214/km^{2} (3,146/sq mi)
- Postcode: 4112

Puketapu	Poraiti	Greenmeadows
	Taradale	Meeanee
Waiohiki		Pakowhai

Taradale is a residential suburb of the city of Napier in the Hawke's Bay region of the North Island of New Zealand. It is located 10 kilometres south-west of the centre of Napier.

For hundreds of years, hills overlooking what is now Taradale were the site of villages occupied by Māori people, latterly of the Ngāti Kahungunu tribe. Europeans started settling at Taradale in the 1850s, and it was officially recognised as a town in 1886. It was a town district from 1886 to 1953, and a borough from 1953 to 1968, when it merged with Napier City. The Taradale area is home to some of New Zealand's oldest and finest vineyards and wineries, with wine-making dating back to the 1850s.

== History ==
=== Early Māori history ===
Several hundred years ago there was a large Māori pā (fortified settlement) on the hills at the southern edge of what is now Taradale. Originally a double pā, the top part was called Hikurangi and the bottom Ōtātara. Occupied by the Tini-o-Awa tribe, also known as Ngāti Awa, the pā covered about 100 hectares and had about 3,000 residents. The pā was on an excellent defensive site beside the Tūtaekurī River, which was navigable by canoe from the sea. Food was plentiful, the hillsides were suitable for kūmara growing and much of the area was a large tidal location with fish, eels and shellfish.

The pā was attacked early in the 16th century by the Ngāti Kahungunu tribe under chiefs Taraia and Rakai-hiku-roa. They came from Tūranga, near what is now Gisborne, and conquered the Hikurangi pā. Unable to take Ōtātara at that time, Taraia set up a new pā at Pākōwhai. Some time later he organised another war party and besieged Ōtātara again. According to legend, he waited until the defenders were short of food, then left, leaving a small party concealed near a patch of bracken fern. The defenders sent two men out to dig for fern-root. They were ambushed and killed and their places taken by two of Taraia's men. When the defenders saw the men digging, they thought they were from Ōtātara so opened up the pā and went out to help. Taraia's men attacked and killed many of the local Māori. The pā then collapsed and was abandoned.

Over the years marriages took place between local Māori and Ngāti Kahungunu and peace was restored. Today the Ōtātara pā site has become a memorial to the Māori who were once so numerous in the area.

=== Early European history ===
Taradale was on the original route from Napier to the farms and settlements of its hinterland and over the ranges to Taihape and Taupō, and on to Auckland. In 1851 Donald McLean purchased the Ahuriri Block, which included present-day Taradale and Greenmeadows, on behalf of the Crown. By the mid-1850s settlers started flocking to Hawke's Bay, with the 1856 census recording 1,057 males and 458 females. The government purchased the Tutaekuri Block in 1856, and it was subdivided along with the Ahuriri Block as the River Meeanee District and released for sale in April 1857. William Colenso purchased several blocks of land in Puketapu and Meeanee, and a 364-acre block that lay between Guppy Road and the hills, and between the Great North Road (now Meeanee Road / Puketapu Road) and the Tūtaekurī River. Henry Stokes Tiffen bought most of the land north of Colenso's block and named his block Green Meadows after the native danthonia grass that covered the region.

Henry Alley arrived and leased land from Colenso in 1858, naming the area "Taradale". It was once thought that he named it after the Hill of Tara, in County Meath, Ireland, where he was supposed to have been born. However, death records indicate that he was instead born in Queen's County (now county Laois), Ireland. He emigrated with his sister Frances to Australia, where he lived in the township of Taradale, Victoria, until circa 1855. Alley built what was reputed to be the first house, somewhere in the vicinity of Alley Place and Lowther Place. Taradale High School retains a link with the early days of Taradale, its emblem incorporating the Tara Brooch.

The Battle of Omarunui, fought nearby on 12 October 1866, saw the settlers and local Māori join to defend against an intrusion by the Hauhau faction during the New Zealand Wars.

In 1886 a petition was sent to the governor of New Zealand, Sir William Francis Drummond Jervois, asking him to proclaim the district of Taradale as a dependent town district under the provision of the Town Districts Act 1881. The Hawke's Bay County Council confirmed the petition and the Town District of Taradale was proclaimed on 2 December 1886. A town board was formed with John Drummond (chairman), Robert Davidson, Richard Martin, Richard Neagle and George Bradley. William Waterhouse was the first town clerk. Taradale was administered by the town board from 1886 to 1953.

=== Twentieth century onwards ===
Before the 1931 Hawke's Bay earthquake, Taradale and Greenmeadows were separated from Napier by a lagoon and tidal mudflats, bridged from 1874 by Taradale Road. Other access was by the coastal road to Awatoto, then to Meeanee village and the Great North Road (Meeanee Road). As well as the geographical boundaries, Anderson Park and green patches on the edge of Greenmeadows are visual boundaries that separate Taradale and Greenmeadows from the rest of Napier City. As a consequence of the 1931 earthquake, the raised seabed enabled Napier's residential suburbs to spread slowly south towards Taradale and Greenmeadows as swamps were reclaimed. Buildings destroyed by the earthquake were rebuilt in Art Deco style architecture, examples being Taradale Town Hall and Taradale Hotel (now a McDonald's restaurant).

The town was administered by Taradale Borough Council from 1953 to 1968. It was one of the fastest-growing boroughs in New Zealand in the 1960s. Retailers considered it a good place to establish shops with rapidly expanding population. People took pride in their property and Taradale became known as the Garden Borough. Amalgamation with Napier was proposed and debated for many years until it was approved by referendum in 1968. The final meeting of the borough council was held on 26 March 1968 before it was absorbed by Napier City Council. The last mayor of Taradale was Arthur Miller, who pushed to establish Taradale Intermediate School and Taradale High School. His support for education was recognised in 1971, when a new primary school in Guppy Road was named Arthur Miller School.

== Geography ==
Taradale is a residential township nestled against the Taradale hills, a 10-minute drive from the centre of Napier. It has one of the highest socioeconomic demographic profiles in Hawke's Bay. Residential housing spans decades of design styles from villas through art deco. Many of Taradale's residents commute to the Napier or Hastings CBDs.

Greenmeadows is a suburb some two kilometres north of the Taradale town centre, and an integral part of the Taradale community. Greenmeadows from the beginning has been seen as an extension of Taradale rather than a separate community. It became part of Taradale Town District formally in 1941. It has a small shopping village with essential services and a New World supermarket. The Taradale and Greenmeadows area is also known merely as Taradale, or Greendale for local facilities.

== Demographics ==
Taradale covers 10.63 km^{2} (4.10 sq mi) and had an estimated population of 12,910 as of June 2025, with a population density of 1,214 people per km^{2}.

Historical population
Year	Pop.	±% p.a.
2006	11,325	—
2013	11,829	+0.62%
2018	12,456	+1.04%
2023	12,855	+0.63%

Taradale had a population of 12,855 in the 2023 New Zealand census, an increase of 399 people (3.2%) since the 2018 census, and an increase of 1,026 people (8.7%) since the 2013 census. There were 6,024 males, 6,795 females, and 36 people of other genders in 5,052 dwellings. 2.3% of people identified as LGBTIQ+. The median age was 46.4 years (compared with 38.1 years nationally). There were 2,220 people (17.3%) aged under 15 years, 1,884 (14.7%) aged 15 to 29, 5,430 (42.2%) aged 30 to 64, and 3,318 (25.8%) aged 65 or older.

People could identify as more than one ethnicity. The results were 84.7% European (Pākehā); 14.4% Māori; 2.3% Pasifika; 8.3% Asian; 0.8% Middle Eastern, Latin American and African New Zealanders (MELAA); and 2.4% other, which includes people giving their ethnicity as "New Zealander". English was spoken by 97.4%, Māori by 3.2%, Samoan by 0.4%, and other languages by 10.0%. No language could be spoken by 1.4% (e.g. too young to talk). New Zealand Sign Language was known by 0.3%. The percentage of people born overseas was 20.9, compared with 28.8% nationally.

Religious affiliations were 34.4% Christian, 1.0% Hindu, 0.4% Islam, 1.2% Māori religious beliefs, 0.9% Buddhist, 0.3% New Age, 0.1% Jewish, and 1.2% other religions. People who answered that they had no religion were 54.3%, and 6.5% of people did not answer the census question.

Of those at least 15 years old, 2,358 (22.2%) people had a bachelor's or higher degree, 5,781 (54.4%) had a post-high school certificate or diploma, and 2,490 (23.4%) people exclusively held high school qualifications. The median income was $39,200, compared with $41,500 nationally. 1,122 people (10.6%) earned over $100,000 compared to 12.1% nationally. The employment status of those at least 15 was 5,004 (47.1%) full-time, 1,392 (13.1%) part-time, and 180 (1.7%) unemployed.

Individual statistical areas
Name	Area (km^{2})	Population	Density (per km^{2})	Dwellings	Median age	Median income
Taradale West	1.69	1,806	1,069	660	48.3 years	$48,200
Taradale South	5.12	2,790	545	1,056	49.6 years	$36,300
Taradale Central	1.18	2,637	2,235	1,155	51.7 years	$36,100
Bledisloe Park	0.88	2,370	2,693	951	40.8 years	$41,400
Tareha Reserve	1.76	3,255	1,849	1,230	42.2 years	$38,100
New Zealand					38.1 years	$41,500

== Wineries ==
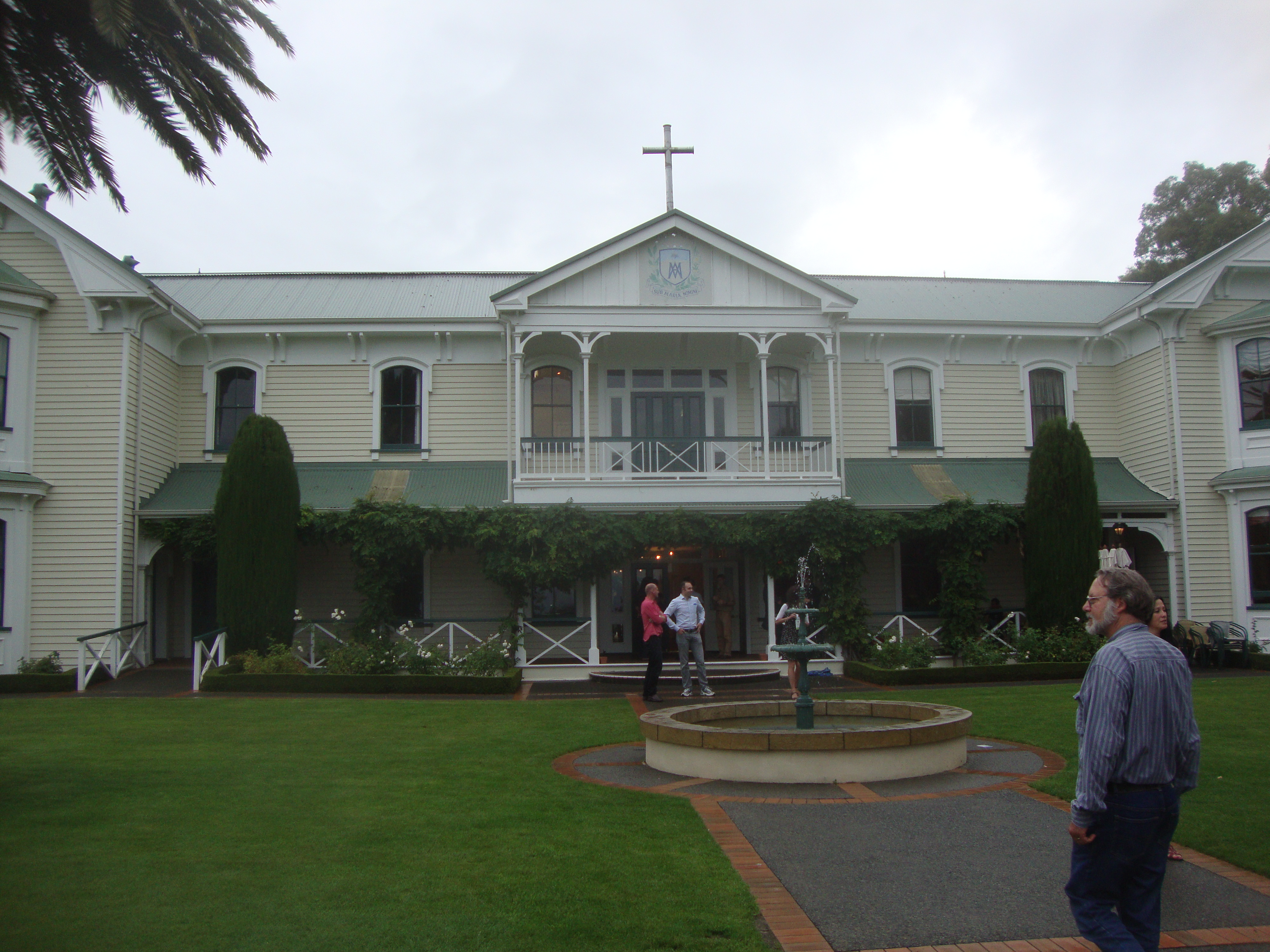
Mission Estate Winery – one of a number of wineries in the area

Taradale is a gateway to some of the finest and oldest wineries in New Zealand. The area is rich in wine heritage dating back as far as the 1850s. Two of the most famous vineyards in Hawke's Bay, Mission Estate Winery and Church Road Winery, together attract over 300,000 tourists annually.

Mission Estate Winery, founded in 1851 and occupying its present site in Church Road since 1897, is the oldest New Zealand winery still in operation and is a tourist attraction. French Marist missionaries established the Hawke's Bay Marist Mission at Pākōwhai in 1851. The mission was moved to Meeanee in 1858 and a vineyard was established to produce sacramental and table wines, and a church and school were built soon after. In 1880 a two-storied house was built as a seminary. Following the 1887 flood, an 800-acre (325 hectares) property in Church Road was purchased from Henry Tiffen and a new vineyard was established. Some of the original terracing can be seen on the hillside area now used for the Mission Concert held every February. In 1910 the Mount St. Mary Seminary building was moved from Meeanee to its present Mission location on Church Road. It was cut into eleven sections and rolled on logs towed by a traction engine, an operation that took two days. An accommodation block was built and opened in February 1931. The next day the Hawke's Bay earthquake struck, causing serious damage to the entire Mission. Two priests and seven students were killed when the stone chapel was destroyed. The seminary building was refurbished in the early 2000s to accommodate a restaurant and function rooms. The Mission is a popular venue for weddings.

The Church Road Winery, formerly McDonald's Wines, was founded in 1897 by Bartholemew Steinmetz, a lay brother from the Marist Mission, and is one of the oldest wineries in Hawke's Bay. Some of its most illustrious years were spent under the leadership of pioneer winemaker Tom McDonald, now widely acknowledged as the father of New Zealand's premium red wine industry. The winery buildings now include a restaurant, and a wine museum, housed underground, traces the history and techniques of winemaking.

With the rapid growth of the wine industry in Hawke's Bay the number of wineries in the Taradale area is increasing. Other wineries near the area include Brookfield's Vineyards, Dolbel Estate situated on the banks of the Tūtaekurī River, Moana Park Winery behind the Taradale hills and Tironui Estate nestled just below Sugarloaf hill.

== Landmarks and facilities ==
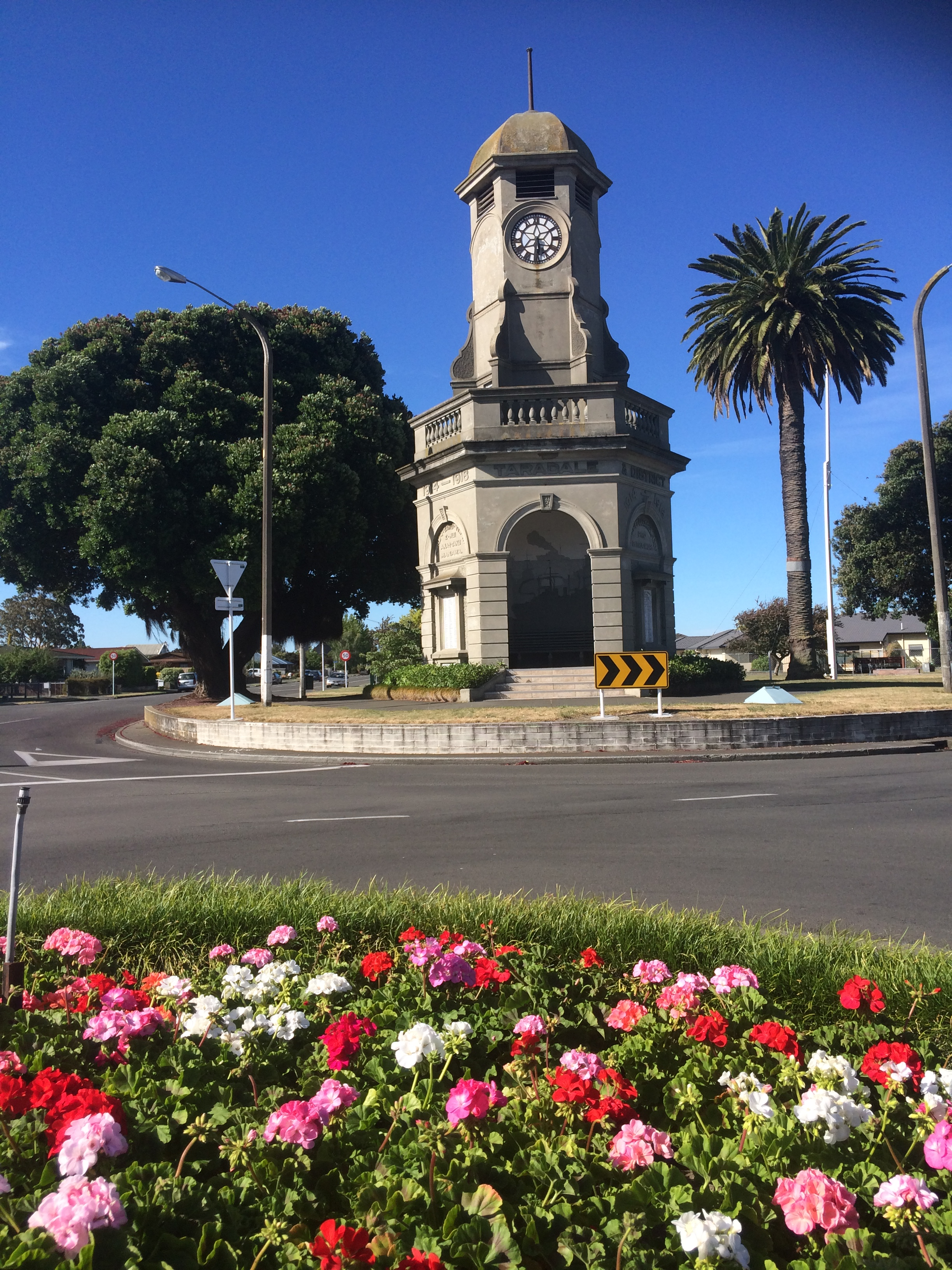
The clock tower

War Memorial Clock Tower

The Taradale clock tower was built in 1923 as a Taradale and District World War 1 Memorial. The tower is situated where several roads converge and is a prominent landmark. Designed by John Ellis and built by Mr A. B. Davis, the hexagonal tower is 15 metres tall. The tower was unveiled in 1923 by Admiral Viscount Jellicoe, Governor General of New Zealand. Following the 1931 earthquake, the tower developed a lean of two feet (0.61 metres) but was able to be restored by John Ellis. In 1997 murals depicting the three armed services were painted by Brenda Morrell.

Taradale Library

When Taradale amalgamated with Napier in 1968, Taradale Library became a branch of Napier Library; the joint library service has been called "Napier Libraries" since a rebranding in 2008. Taradale Library was in a building on Gloucester Street until 1995, when it moved to a new extension of the former rugby club rooms on White Street. A 2007 study recommended that the building be extended to a total floor area of 1275 square metres. The current re-built and enlarged building cost $1.7 million and opened on 13 July 2009. It has seating and large windows that take advantage of views of Centennial and Taradale parks.

Pettigrew Green Arena

Pettigrew Green Arena is a large facility that can accommodate small or large sports games, concerts and fairs. It has a gym, squash / badminton facilities, yoga and ball training. It also has the Sport Hawke's Bay office, which helps with promoting sport to young people, organising games and competitions and has a service offered to young children to help them lead more healthy lives, as well as some programs for adults.

Tareha Recreational Reserve

Tareha Recreational Reserve is a sport and recreation ground at the southern end of Taradale, near the Tūtaekurī River. The land was originally set aside as a Crown reserve in 1917, as part of a soil conservation and river control reserve for the river. The land was separated from the riverbed by the construction of the stopbank in 1970. Its ownership passed from the Hawke's Bay Catchment Board to the Hawke's Bay Regional Council, and during this period it was used as a nursery and for grazing stock. In 1992, Taradale Rugby Club approached the regional council looking to lease the area for playing fields. Following negotiations the land was transferred to Napier City Council to be developed as a recreation reserve. The park's name commemorates Tareha Te Moananui, a Māori tribal leader and member of Parliament who lived nearby at Waiohiki.

== Parks and reserves ==
Sugar Loaf

The 127-metre hill known as Sugar Loaf or Pukekura dominates the skyline of the western hills above Taradale and its distinctive shape can be seen from all over Taradale and parts of Napier. On the summit of the hill was once Pukekura Pā, an outpost pā of Ōtātara Pā and Hikurangi Pā, built and occupied at about the same time. Mr G. Halliwell bought the hill and surrounding land from Henry Tiffen in the 1980s. It has always been a focus for recreation in the area, probably due to the magnificent 360-degree views of Hawke's Bay from the summit. In the 1920s it was site of moonlight picnics particularly popular with younger people, and in the 1930s motorbike races were held in Taradale each Easter, with the hill-climb section taking the riders up the steep slopes of Sugar Loaf. The hill did not escape unscathed in the earthquake of 1931. Church Road Winery winemaker Tom McDonald recalled 'seeing the top of the hill rise up in the air and fall down again an estimated seven feet'. The Halliwell family gave the summit and surrounding area in the 1980s to be retained as a reserve.

Eastern views from the summit cover the Napier–Taradale area and much of the Heretaunga Plains, while western views include the Ruahine and Kaweka Ranges. The track to the summit is steep, especially from the Cumberland Rise entrance. The walk is graded moderate to difficult.

The Taradale Hills are split into 4 parts: The pine tree-covered hill of Mission Heights, the distinctive Sugarloaf, the reserve hill of Dolbel/Puketapu and the steep hill slope of Ōtātara.

Ōtātara Pā Historical Reserve

Located on a commanding hill site south of Taradale, Ōtātara Pā is among New Zealand's most important archaeological sites. Providing an insight into the area's Māori history, the original Ōtātara and Hikurangi pā sites are encompassed in the 33-hectare historical reserve formed in 1973. Ngāti Pārau of Waiohiki, kaitiaki (caretakers) of Ōtātara, have partnered with the Department of Conservation in developing and managing the reserve. Māori occupied the knoll as long ago as the late 15th century, and it was here that Ngāti Kahungunu gained a foothold in Heretaunga and spread to become the dominant iwi in Hawke's Bay and the Wairarapa. The remains of house terraces and food pits can be seen, and restoration work has included tree planting, palisades and pouwhenua, the carved posts symbolising the relationship between Māori iwi and hapu and the land.

Following the hilly track, walkers can appreciate the site's natural defensive qualities. Standing sentinel over the Heretaunga Plains to the south, both pā were protected from attack by cliffs, steep spurs and a steep drop to the Tūtaekurī River.

Dolbel Reserve

Dolbel Reserve is named after brothers Philip and Richard Dolbel, who came from Jersey to New Zealand in 1855 and owned farmland that included the present reserve land. The reserve covers 18 hectares of flat land and hill terrain and a walk to the top gives extensive views over Hawke's Bay from Mahia to Cape Kidnappers. There are approximately 10 km of track, on the flat and climbing to the hilltop over open slopes and through gullies of native planting. In 1991 Taradale Rotary Club took on the project of creating a tree park on this council-owned reserve under the guidance of the former Napier Council Parks and Reserves Manager Don Bell. The vision of Rotary was to establish a memorial park of trees for the free use of the community, with people able to arrange to plant a tree to mark a family milestone.

Anderson Park

Anderson Park covers an area of 40 hectares and is situated on what was once a racecourse owned by Henry Tiffen. Napier Park Racing Club set up their headquarters here in 1886 and racing continued until 1961. Several saltwater creeks, used as hazards in the horse races, traversed the area and the line of these can still be traced in the contours of the park. The large pond was used as a "borrowing pond", the silt being dredged and spread on the straight each season to level and top-dress it. In 1931 the large open space was used as a field hospital for casualties of the earthquake. After the stand was demolished, the rubble was consolidated and grassed over, rather than being removed, now forming a low mound on the southern side of the park. A block of the original stables has been preserved on the western edge of the park, today used as Parks and Reserve Department storage. The land could have become a residential subdivision, but was acquired as a pleasure ground in 1962 by Napier City Council and has been developed into the fine open space it is today. On his death in 1963 Haskell Anderson, after whom the park was named and founder of a large local nursery, left a bequeath to Napier City Council to establish the JN Anderson Family Endowment Fund for tree planting.

Taradale Domain and Centennial Park

Taradale Park was opened in 1916 on land leased and later purchased by Taradale Town Board and over the years has become a valuable community amenity. The water wheel was erected by the Rotary Club in 1968. The wheel was originally built in 1920 and was used to generate electricity in a private home. Taradale Park is the home of the Taradale Sports Association, which includes Taradale Cricket Club, Napier Harriers Club, Greendale Tennis Club and Taradale Association Football Club. Taradale Public Library and associated parking are on a separate title subdivided off Centennial Park. The southern corner of the reserve provides a children's play area and a skateboard bowl. Taradale Kindergarten and Taradale Friendship Centre are also on the reserve. A passive recreation area, the western extension – Centennial Park – is treed and includes a rose garden and water features.

== Education ==
- Arthur Miller School is a Years 1 to 6 state primary school with a roll of 310. It opened as Bledisloe No. 2 in 1969, and was named Arthur Miller School in 1971 after the mayor of Taradale Borough.
- Bledisloe School is a Years 1 to 6 state primary school with a roll of 286. It opened in 1958.
- Reignier Catholic School is a Years 1 to 8 state-integrated Catholic primary school with a roll of 216. A parish school was opened by Father Reignier in Meeanee in 1873. The current school opened in 1926 as St Joseph's Primary School, and was renamed in 1974.
- Taradale Primary School is a Years 1 to 6 state primary school with a roll of 414 It opened in 1879.
- Taradale Intermediate is a Years 7 to 8 state intermediate school with a roll of 504. It opened in 1967.
- Taradale High School is a Years 9 to 13 state secondary school with a roll of 1,049. It opened in 1970.
- Fairhaven special needs school was open in 1958.

All these schools are co-educational. Rolls are as of July 2026.

The expanding Eastern Institute of Technology (EIT) provides a broad range of diploma and degree qualifications.
