= 1905 New Zealand rugby union tour of Australia =

- Manager: N. Gallbraith
- Tour captain: Jimmy Hunter
- Top point scorer: Billy Wallace (23)
- Top try scorer(s): Billy Wallace (5); Duncan McGregor (5)
Summary
| P | W | D | L |
Total
| 7 | 4 | 1 | 2 |
Test match
| 0 | 0 | 0 | 0 |

Tour chronology
- ← 1903 Australia 1905–06 Europe & N.America →

The 1905 New Zealand rugby union tour of Australia was the fifth tour by the New Zealand team to Australia and the first in their own country. Three matches were played against Australian teams and four against provincial sides in New Zealand.

== Touring party ==
- Manager: N. Gallbraith
- Captain: Jimmy Hunter

| Name | Province | Position |
|---|---|---|
| George Gillet | Canterbury | Fullback |
| Billy Wallace | Wellington | Utility back |
| Ernest Booth | Otago | Wing three-quarter |
| Duncan McGregor | Wellington | Wing three-quarter |
| Hector Thomson | Wanganui | Wing three-quarter |
| George Smith | Auckland | Centre three-quarter |
| Jimmy Hunter | Taranaki | Centre three-quarter |
| Simon Mynott | Taranaki | Fly-half |
| Fred Roberts | Wellington | Halfback |
| Steve Casey | Otago | Hooker |
| John Corbett | West Coast | Forward |
| Frank Glasgow | Taranaki | Forward |
| Fred Newton | Canterbury | Lock |
| William Speirs Glenn | Taranaki | Loose forward |
| Massa Johnston | Otago | Loose forward |
| Alex McDonald | Otago | Loose forward |
| George Nicholson | Auckland | Loose forward |
| James O'Sullivan | Taranaki | Loose forward |
| Charlie Seeling | Auckland | Loose forward |

== Matches ==
Complete list of matches played by New Zealand during their tour:

=== Tour matches ===
| # | Date | Rival | City | Venue | Score |
|---|---|---|---|---|---|
| 1 | 1 Jul | Auckland RU | Auckland | Alexandra Park | 3–9 |
| 2 | 8 Jul | NSW Waratahs | Sydney | Cricket Ground | 19–0 |
| 3 | 12 Jul | Metropolitan Union | Sydney | Cricket Ground | 22–3 |
| 4 | 15 Jul | NSW Waratahs | Sydney | Cricket Ground | 8–8 |
| 5 | 22 Jul | Otago / Southland RU | Dunedin | Caledonian Ground | 10–10 |
| 6 | 27 Jul | Canterbury RU | Christchurch | Lancaster Park | 21–3 |
| 7 | 29 Jul | Wellington RU | Wellington | Athletic Park | 0–3 |

Balance
| Pl | W | D | L | Ps | Pc |
|---|---|---|---|---|---|
| 7 | 4 | 1 | 2 | 89 | 30 |
