= The Original All Blacks =

First New Zealand national rugby union team to tour outside Australasia

1905–1906 New Zealand tour in Europe and North America
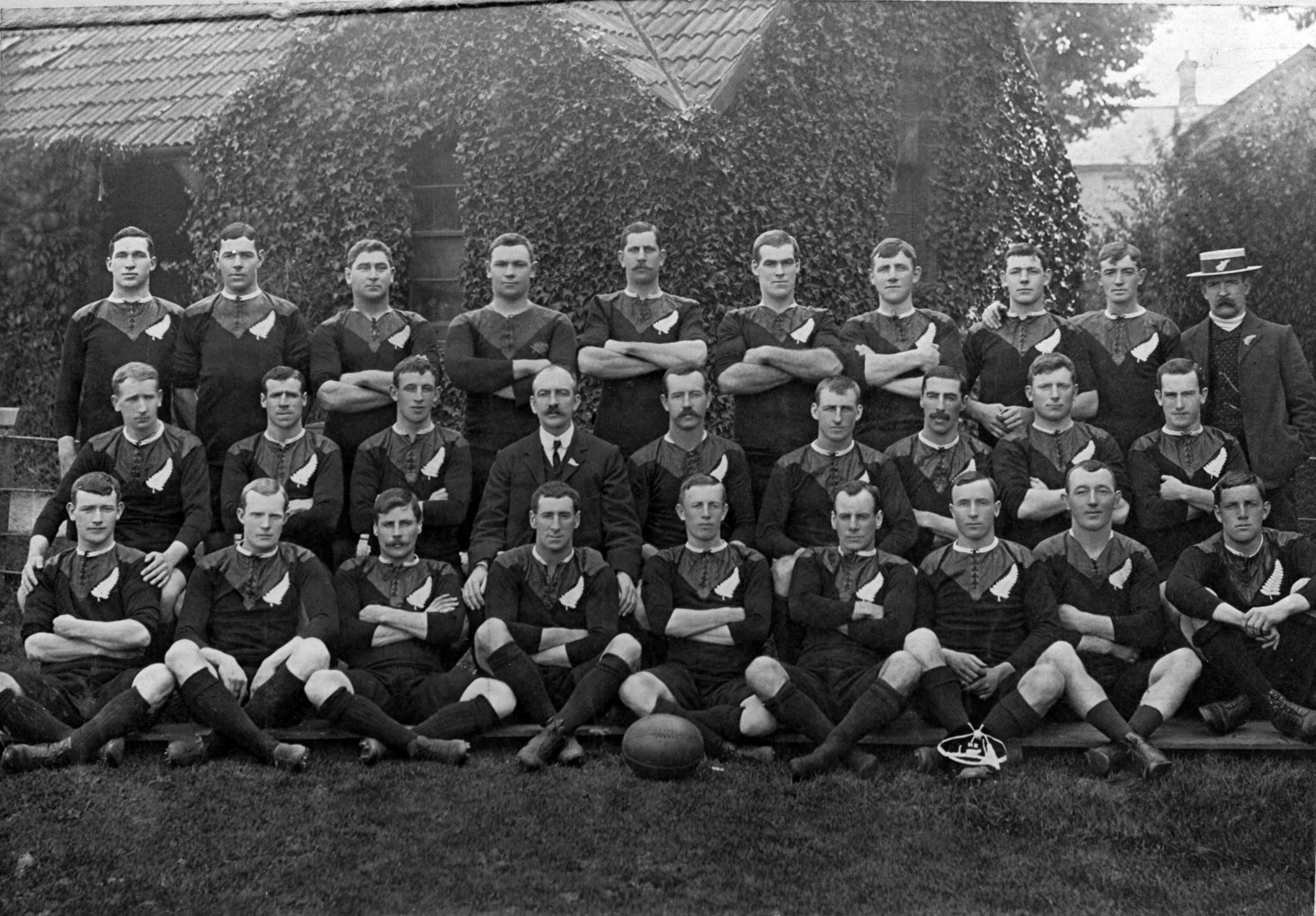
- The Original All Blacks while on tour in the United Kingdom.
- Manager: George Dixon
- Coach: Jimmy Duncan
- Tour captain: Dave Gallaher
- Top point scorer: Billy Wallace (246)
- Top try scorer: Jimmy Hunter (43)
Summary
P	W	D	L
Total
35	34	0	1
Test match
5	4	0	1
Opponent
P	W	D	L
Scotland
1	1	0	0
Ireland
1	1	0	0
England
1	1	0	0
Wales
1	0	0	1
France
1	1	0	0

Tour chronology
- ← 1905 Australia 1907 Australia →

The Original All Blacks (also known simply as the "Originals") were the first New Zealand national rugby union team to tour outside Australasia. They toured the British Isles, France and the United States of America during 1905–1906. Their opening game, on 16 September 1905, was against Devon whom they defeated 55–4. They defeated every English side that they faced, including a 16–3 victory over English county champions Durham, and a 32–0 victory over Blackheath. They defeated Scotland, Ireland, and England with the closest of the three matches their 12–7 victory over Scotland. The team's only loss of the tour was a 3–0 defeat by Wales at Cardiff Arms Park. A try claimed by winger Bob Deans was not awarded by the referee and later became a subject of controversy. However, Wales were generally considered the better team with the All Blacks playing particularly poorly in the first half of the game. They managed narrow wins against four Welsh club teams and went on to play France in France's first-ever test match. They returned to New Zealand via North America where they played two matches against Canadian teams. Overall they played a total of thirty-five matches, which included five tests, and only lost once—the defeat by Wales.

The 1905 All Blacks tour of Britain went on to achieve legendary status within the rugby world and New Zealand in particular. They scored 976 points and conceded only 59, and thus set the standard for future All Blacks sides. The tour also saw the first use of the All Blacks name and established New Zealand's reputation as a world-class rugby nation. Some of these players eventually defected to participate in the professional 1907–08 tour of Australia and Great Britain where they played against Northern Union sides in the sport that would eventually become known as rugby league.

== History ==
=== Background ===
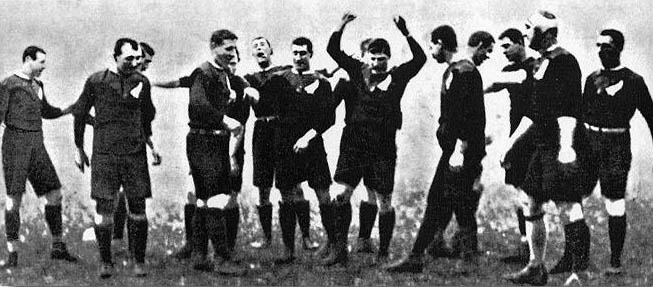
The 1905 Originals during the "haka".

After the formation of the New Zealand Rugby Football Union in 1892, New Zealand representative teams were selected for matches against international opponents. The first tour by a New Zealand representative side under NZRFU auspices was in 1894 to New South Wales (although an earlier team had toured Britain and Australia in 1888–1889). New Zealand's first test match was in 1903 when they played Australia in Sydney. New Zealand's first home test was played the following year when they defeated Britain at Athletic Park, Wellington, by 9–3. The win was significant as Britain had been unbeaten in their Australian tour, yet they won only two out of five matches in New Zealand. The captain of Great Britain, David Bedell-Sivright, said after the test that he could not see New Zealand winning the big matches on their Northern Hemisphere tour, but "I think you will probably win most of the county matches."

The New Zealand selectors named a squad of 53 players from which the touring team would be selected in late 1904. The following year, on 25 February, a list of 16 "certainties" for the tour was named (one of whom would eventually not tour due to injury). A final opportunity for selection was the North-South inter-island match on 3 June 1905 after which, 25 players were selected for the team, and an additional two were added prior to the team's departure to Britain.

Before the Northern Hemisphere tour, 18 of the squad conducted a preliminary three-match tour of Australia where they won two matches and drew the other. They also played four pre-tour matches in New Zealand, winning two, drawing one, and losing their final match 3–0 to Wellington.

The team departed for England aboard the Rimutaka on 30 July. There were two ports of call on the journey – Montevideo, and Tenerife – before their arrival in Plymouth, England. The day after their arrival on 8 September, the squad travelled 24 km (15 mi) to Newton Abbot, which served as the team's training base throughout much of the tour.

=== Early matches ===
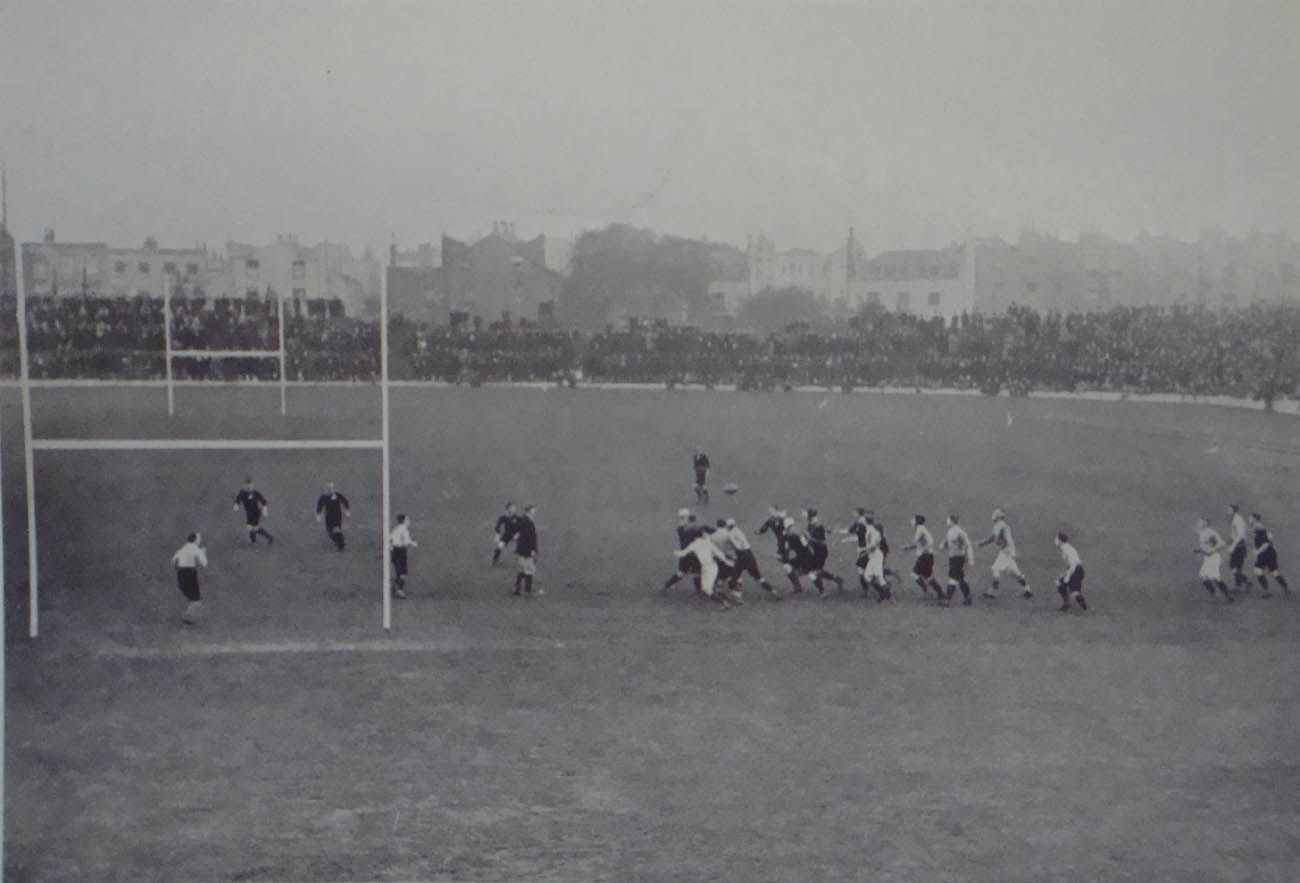
The Originals playing Middlesex at Stamford Bridge.

Their first match took place on 16 September 1905 against Devon, who had been runners-up in the most recent English county championship, and for whom played ten members of Devonport Albion, the top club in England. Because of this, Devon went into the match as favourites, however the crowd of 6,000 at the match were soon stunned by the New Zealanders as they scored 12 tries and eventually won 55–4. Billy Wallace scored 28 points, including three tries, and it would be another 51 years before another All Black would score more points in one match. The score caused a sensation in Britain, and some newspapers even incorrectly reported the score as Devon 55, New Zealand 4. Eventually the reports were corrected, and the New Zealanders returned to Newton Abbot to be greeted by a brass band and cheering crowd.

Five days later New Zealand faced Cornwall at Recreation Ground in Camborne. Although the score was only 12–0 at half time, the New Zealanders ended up with 11 tries, and a 41–0 victory. The team then travelled to play Bristol, who they played on 23 September. The game was played in front of 6,500 spectators, with the same result as the Cornwall match, a 41–0 victory for New Zealand. They then travelled to Northampton, after stopping in London. The game resulted in another victory, this time 31–0, to the All Blacks. By now, the All Blacks had scored 169 points in their four games, with only four against.

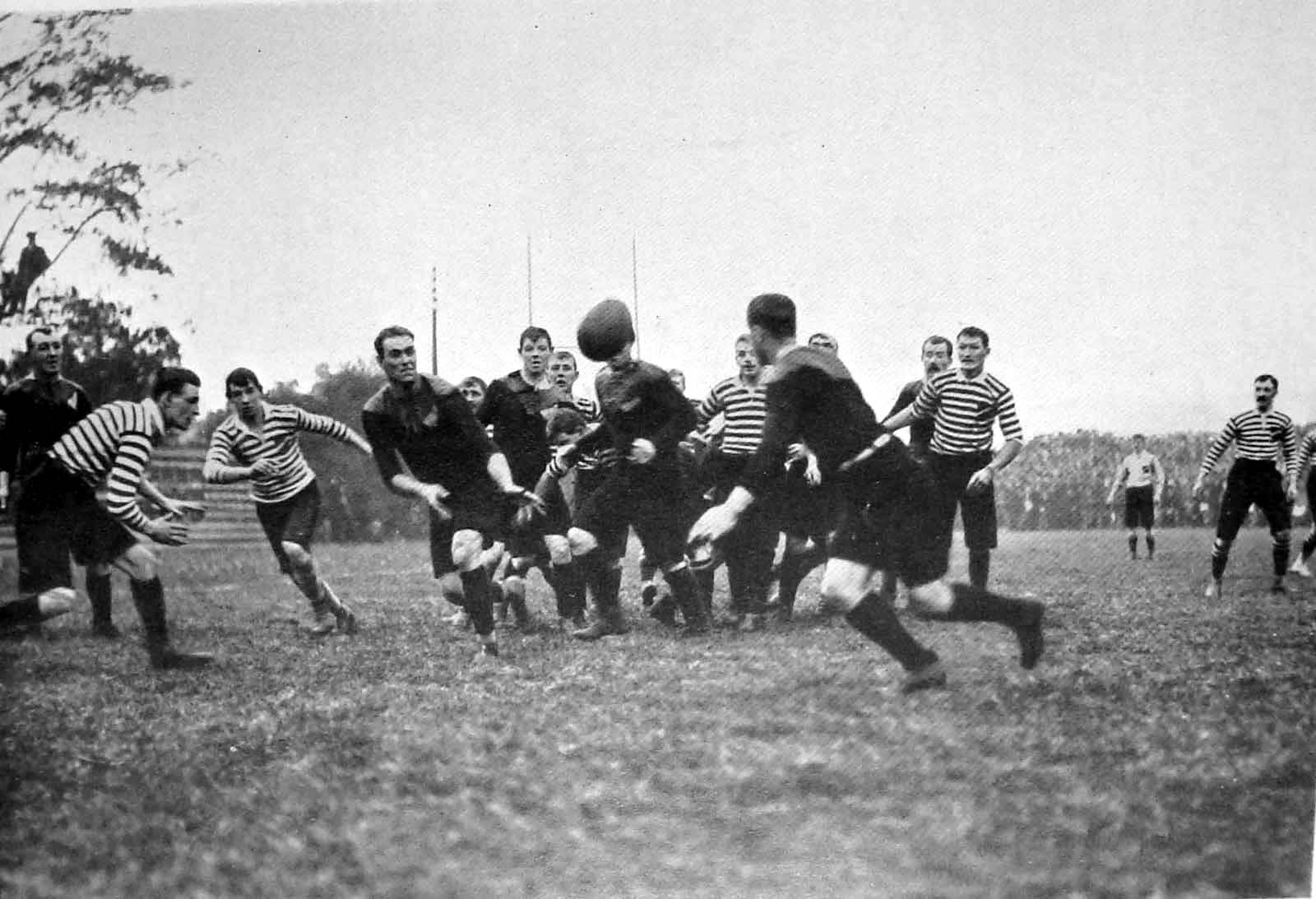
The match vs. Somerset at Jarvis's Field.

The next match was against Leicester at Welford Road on 30 September. Four players in the Leicester team would go on to play in the England test; more than any other club. Although the All Blacks were held scoreless for the first 25 minutes, at the time the longest period that the All Blacks had gone without scoring on tour, George Smith eventually crossed for the All Blacks first score of the game. The All Blacks ended the match 28–0 winners.

After the following match against Middlesex, won 34–0 by the All Blacks, The Daily Chronicle said "These New Zealanders turn defence into attack with such bewildering rapidity as to prove that scrummaging is a mere detail. There is nothing in the game in which they do not excel."

The toughest game of the tour so far was against Durham County, on 7 October. Durham were the English county champions, and were the first team to score a try against the All Blacks on tour. Despite the small 6–3 advantage to the All Blacks at the break, they scored 10 unanswered points in the second half to win 16–3. The All Blacks' closest game of the tour so far was immediately followed by their largest win. The match against Hartlepool Clubs, one of the strongest teams in northern England, was won 63–0 by the All Blacks.

The All Blacks next three games were against Northumberland, Gloucester, and Somerset. None of the sides scored against the All Blacks; with them losing by 31, 44, and 23 points to nil respectively. Four days following the Somerset match, the All Blacks faced Devonport Albion. Devonport Albion were England's club champion, and the runners-up for Great Britain club champion. 20,000 spectators witnessed another All Blacks victory; this time by 21–3.

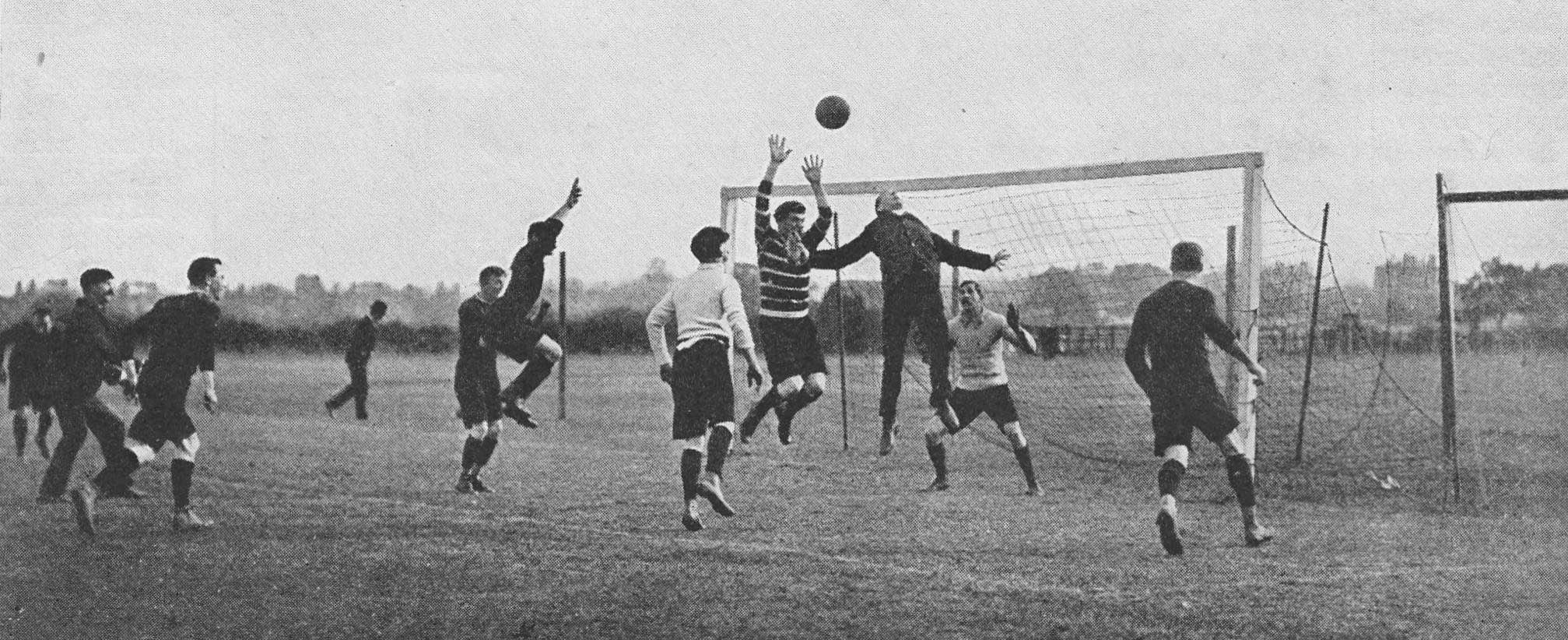
The All Blacks playing association football during a training before the match against Surrey.

For the match against Midland Counties at Leicester, 17,000 spectators, as well as officials from the Welsh rugby union attended the match. Although Midland Counties scored a converted try, the All Blacks retained their winning record with a 21–5 victory. The victory over Midland Counties was followed by an 11–0 victory over Surrey, and 32–0 victory over Blackheath. The seven try win over Blackheath was considered by Wallace to be the end of the All Blacks' peak—"Unfortunately, after this game injuries began to take their toll and prevented us ever putting in so fine a team again on the tour."

The next three game for the All Blacks would be played in five days. The All Blacks scored 13 tries, and Jimmy Hunter five of them, as they ran up a 47–0 victory over Oxford University. Their next match, two days later, was against Cambridge University. The Scotland test was approaching, and the All Blacks decided to rest several players, Hunter, Billy Stead, Selling and George Gillett. Cambridge's kicking game, and fast backs helped them to restrict the score to 14–0 to the All Blacks. Two days later the All Blacks faced Richmond, and scored five tries to register a 17–0 victory. Their last game before the Scotland test was against a Bedford XV in Richmond. There were four All Black tries in the first half, and six in the second. The final score was 41–0; the All Blacks had now scored over 600 points on tour.

=== Scotland ===
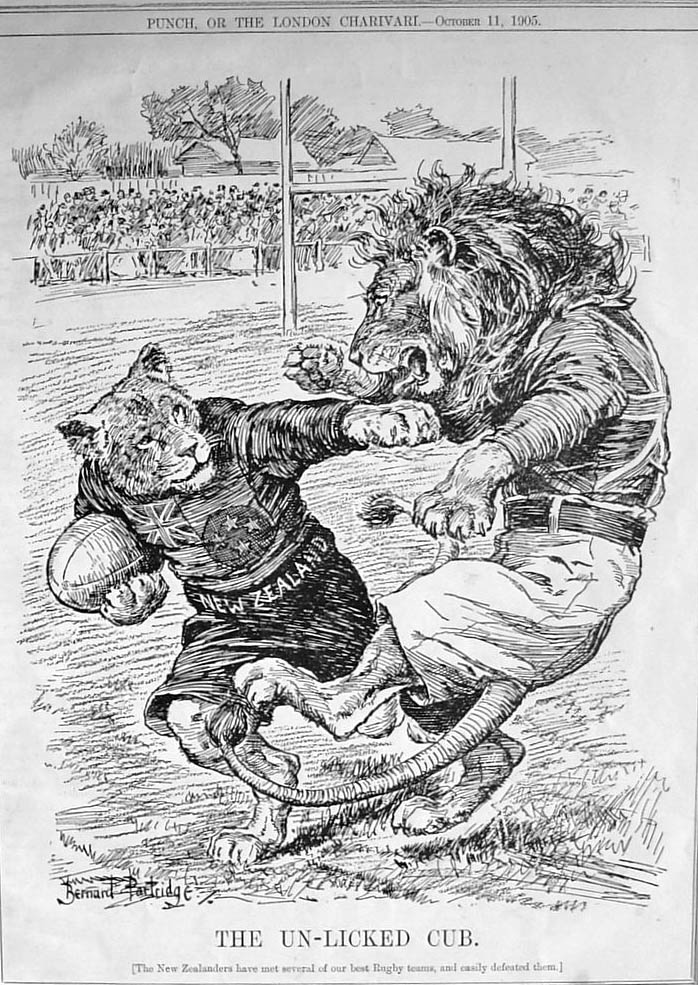
Illustration by Bernard Partridge published in Punch magazine, with a depiction of a cub beating a lion

At the time of the Tour, rugby in Scotland was a game of the upper classes, and the Scottish Rugby Union (SRU) was very conservative. Their officials believed the game should remain strictly amateur, and that rugby was for the players, not the spectators. The Scottish were uncomfortable with the public interest in the All Blacks, and did not make them feel very welcome. They interpreted a letter sent to them stating that the All Blacks did not want to be entertained after their match quite literally, and the All Blacks were not invited to the after-match dinner organised by the Scottish Union. As well as this, the SRU refused to grant international caps for the game.

The game was a financial success for the NZRFU. The NZRFU had asked for a £500 financial guarantee from the SRU for the game, but because of their poor finances, the SRU offered instead to give the entire gate (minus expenses). Due to a big attendance, the NZRFU received a fee of over £1700 for the game. Although the SRU were very happy with this (they offered the same terms to the Springboks when they toured in 1906), there were also concerns about the three shillings a day each All Black received whilst on tour. After they found that the Rugby Football Union had approved the payments, a Calcutta Cup match was cancelled.

The game was played on 18 November on an icy pitch (straw had not been spread over the pitch the night before), which nearly caused the game to be cancelled. The All Blacks kicked off, and had the best of the first ten minutes. Scotland eventually got a scrum near the All Blacks goal-line, and after winning the scrum, passed to Ernest Simson, who dropped a goal to put Scotland ahead 4–0. It was the first time the All Blacks had been behind on tour. The All Blacks replied with a try under the posts, which was unconverted. A second try was then scored, by Smith; again it went unconverted. Scotland then scored an unconverted try, to lead at half time 7–6. With less than ten minutes to go the score remained 7–6 and it looked like the All Blacks might lose their first match on tour. However, with four minutes to go the All Blacks had a scrum on halfway; the resulting movement finished with George Smith crossing for a try. Bill Cunningham then scored a try with seconds remaining, and the All Blacks were victorious 12–7.

Four days after the Scotland test the All Blacks faced West of Scotland District in Glasgow. The cities' secondary schools were given half a day off to watch the match. The All Blacks scored six tries on the way to a 22–0 victory. The team then travelled to Ireland, for their third test.

=== Ireland ===
The welcome extended by the Irish Rugby Football Union (IRFU) was in contrast to that of Scotland. The morning they arrived in Belfast they were met by several IRFU officials who took them out for breakfast. The arrival in Ireland also marked a homecoming for the captain Dave Gallaher, who was born in County Donegal, but had moved to New Zealand at the age of four. Thousands awaited the All Blacks when they arrived in the Dublin train station. On the Thursday before the test, both teams attended the theatre together; sitting alternatively so they could better mix.

The sold out test was played on Saturday 25 November at Lansdowne Road. The 12,000 that turned up did not get to see Gallaher though, as he was injured. Simon Mynott was also selected to play on the wing despite having never played there before, and there being three three-quarters available. For a 30-minute period in the first half the Irish forwards dominated, however the deadlock was broken close to half time when Bob Deans scored a try under the posts; Wallace converted the try giving the All Blacks a 5–0 half-time lead. Early in the second half Deans scored another try; again converted by Wallace. Smith lost the ball over the line before Alex McDonald scored the All Blacks third and final try. Wallace successfully converted to give the All Blacks a 15–0 victory.

The All Blacks then headed to Limerick for their one other game in Ireland. Not all of the team travelled for the match against Munster, and Dixon had even tried to get the All Blacks out of the game. The match played on Tuesday 28 November was won 33–0 by the All Blacks. The eight tries witnessed by the 3,000 strong crowd included a penalty try after Fred Roberts was tripped close to the line.

=== England ===
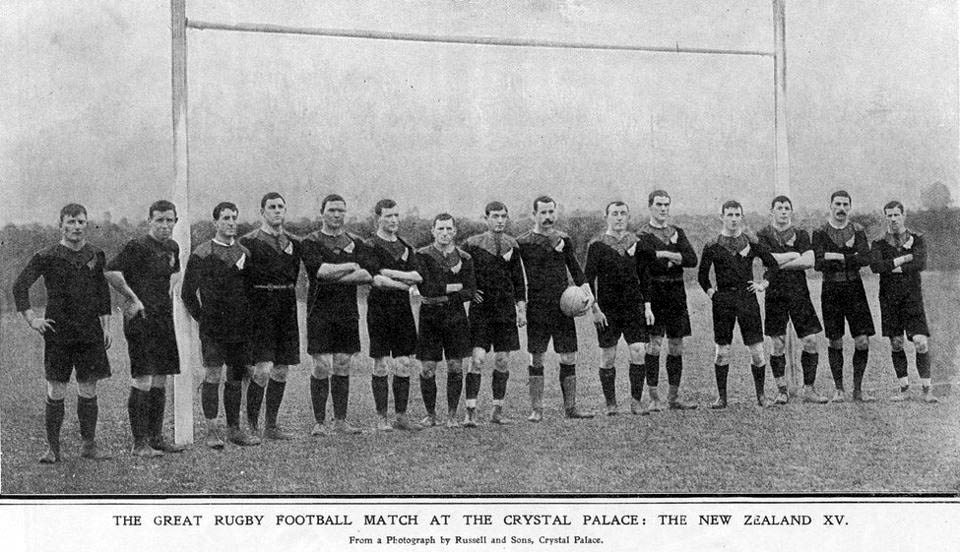
The team that beat England at the Crystal Palace on 9 Dec 1905

Following the Munster match the All Blacks returned to England. Due to its larger capacity, the game was played at Crystal Palace (which had an official capacity of 50,000) rather than Blackheath. Despite the official capacity, it is estimated between 70,000 and 100,000 people attended the match; many of them non-paying spectators. The 100,000 spectators, including George, Prince of Wales (the future King George V), was a record for a rugby or football match in London.

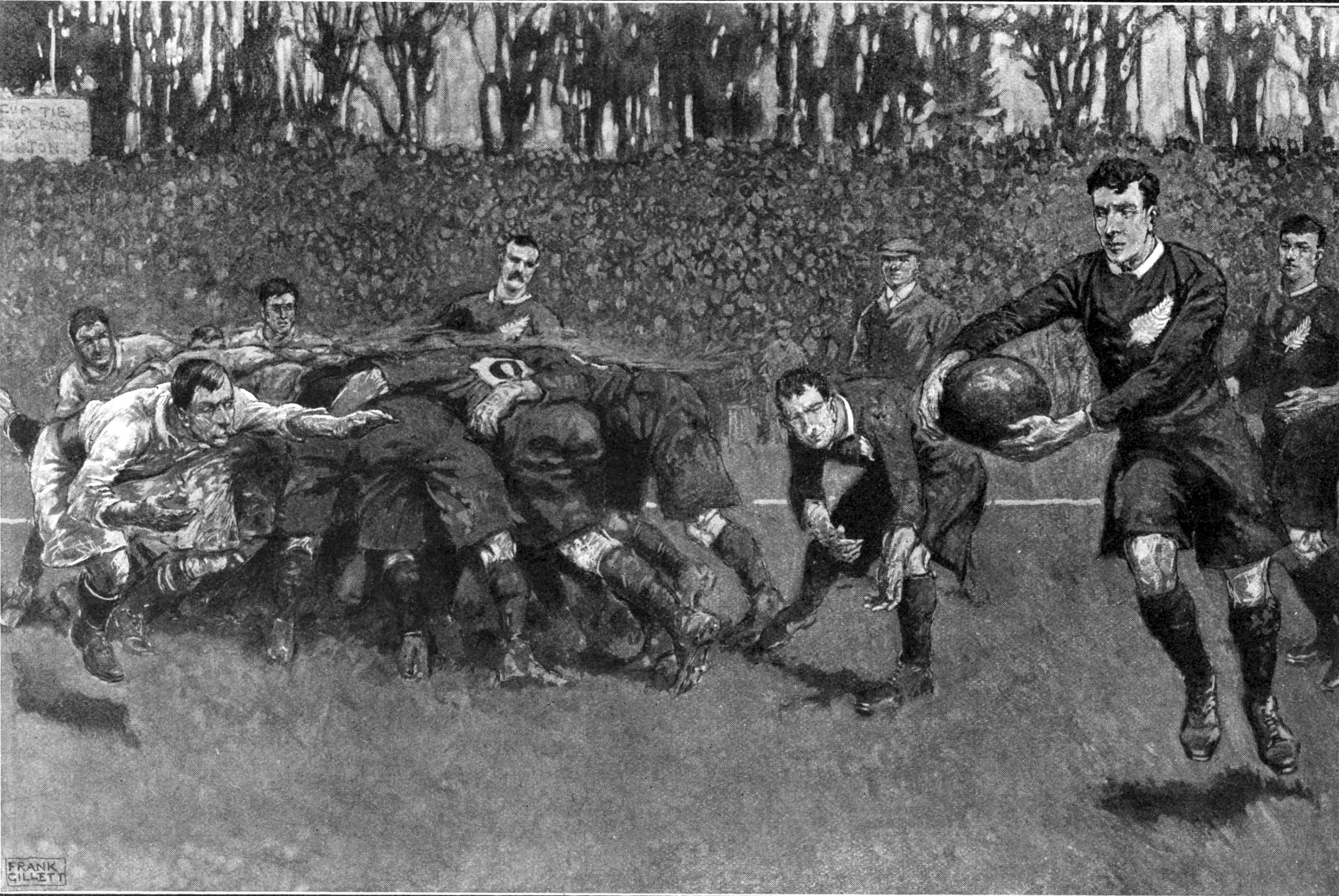
Illustration by Frank Gillett showing the England versus All Blacks test attended by a then record crowd of at least 50,000

The England test was the All Blacks' third international in as many weeks; they had been played on successive Saturdays, with a mid-week match between each. England named eight new caps in their side, and played a rover (or wing-forward) on top of seven forwards. The game has been described as "a benefit for All Black wing Duncan McGregor". He scored four tries in the test—a record not equalled by an All Black until 1987. (Note: The feat eventually surpassed when Marc Ellis scored six tries for the All Blacks against Japan at the 1995 Rugby World Cup.) A try was also scored by Fred Newton, and with none of the five tries converted, the score finished 15–0. English sportsman C. B. Fry said after the match, "The notion that these men beat us because of our physical degeneracy is nonsense. They beat us by organisation and by tactics." (Note: Fry was an international cricketer, soccer player, and former long jump world-record holder.) A legacy of this match is that the whistle used by the referee, Gil Evans, has been used to start the opening match of every Rugby World Cup tournament. Between tournaments the whistle is housed at the New Zealand Rugby Museum in Palmerston North and was donated to them by the chairman of the NZRFU and manager of the 1924–25 All Blacks.

The All Blacks had three more games before their Wales test Their first was again Cheltenham on 6 December at Cheltenham. The match was won by the All Blacks 18–0 after they scored four tries; three of them by Abbott. The next match was at Birkenhead against Cheshire. The All Blacks scored 10 tries and recorded their biggest win in nearly a month. The final score witnessed by the 8,000 strong crowd at Birkenhead Park was 34–0. The All Blacks' last match before facing Wales was against Yorkshire in Leeds. The game was played in Northern Union territory, and there were many league scouts trying to recruit All Black squad members to the rival code. 24,000 spectators watched as the All Blacks won 40–0, which included 10 tries.

=== Wales test ===
The Originals' test against Wales is still considered one of sport's great matches. The test was played at Cardiff Arms Park, 16 December 1905 in front of 47,000 spectators. The All Blacks were applauded onto the park where they performed their haka in front of a silent crowd. Once they had applauded their haka, the crowd, led by 'Teddy' Morgan, sang the Welsh national anthem Hen Wlad Fy Nhadau (Land of My Fathers). The match was reportedly the first time a national anthem had been sung before a sporting fixture. (Note: Although the United States national anthem, "The Star-Spangled Banner", was first sung before baseball games in the mid-19th century, it did not become the country's official national anthem until 1931. In addition, the song's pregame use did not become customary until the 1920s.)

The lead-up to the match was controversial. The All Blacks' manager George Dixon and the Welsh Rugby Union (WRU) could not agree on a referee. Dixon rejected all of the WRU's proposed referees, and the WRU all of Dixon's. The rules of the day dictated that in such a case the WRU could ask another union to appoint a referee. They asked the Scotland Rugby Union, who appointed Scotsman John Dallas. As well as the referee, the selection of Mynott at first five-eighth over Billy Stead was highly controversial. Several explanations were given for Stead's omission. One was that he was originally selected, but gave up his spot in the team for a disappointed Mynott. The official reason given for Stead's omission was injury—although he was fit enough to act as touch judge during the test.

After the kick-off there was soon a scrum ordered The All Blacks were repeatedly penalised by the referee whenever they had a scrum. The reason for this was the All Blacks 2–3–2 scrum formation where they had only two front-rowers. (Note: 2–3–2 refers to two front rowers, three-second rowers and two back rowers. This is different from the standard 3–2–3 scrum formation which was used by the Home Nations at the time.) The Welsh team used a three-man front row, and had studied the All Blacks scrummaging technique. The Welsh countered the All Blacks 2–3–2 scrum formation by setting their front row after the All Blacks, and hence preventing the All Blacks from gaining the loosehead. Consequently, every time the All Blacks tried to hook the ball they were penalised, and this prompted their captain Gallaher to order his team not to contest the scrums, and to instead let the Welsh win the ball.

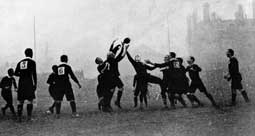
A line-out in the All Blacks versus Wales test

The All Blacks' first-half play was generally considered poor—with aimless kicking to Welsh fullback Winfield who returned much better kicks into touch. The first ten minutes saw New Zealand's Roberts break the line twice only, to be caught by Winfield without support. Eventually Wales had a scrum-feed 25 yards out from the All Blacks' try-line. From this Wales executed a planned move—Owen got the Wales scrum-ball and dummied on his right to Bush. He then turned left and passed to Cliff Pritchard. Pritchard then passed to Gabe, who passed to Bush, who eventually passed to Morgan. Morgan then raced 25 yards down the touchline, eluding Gillett, to score for Wales. Winfield missed the resulting conversion—leaving the score at 3–0. In the final stages of the first half the All Blacks began to assert themselves and were attacking strongly when half-time was sounded. Dixon claimed half-time was called two minutes early, and Wallace that it was three minutes early.

The All Blacks kicked off for the second half and the two teams were evenly matched. The All Blacks first five-eighth Mynott was having a poor game—dropping the ball frequently. Eventually Roberts stopped passing to him, and would instead run the ball himself. The Welsh had try-scoring opportunities, but drop-goal attempts and dropped passes prevented them scoring. Some time during the second half (various accounts are given—all identifying different times in the match) the All Blacks got their best attacking opportunity of the match. The Welsh won a line-out on the All Blacks side of half-way and, with the resulting ball, kicked diagonally across-field which was fielded by New Zealand's Wallace. Wallace then ran and broke through the Welsh line before confronting their fullback Winfield. Wallace then passed to Deans who was tackled either on, or near the Welsh line. The referee Dallas awarded a scrum to Wales five yards from their line. A contemporary report states "Morgan sprinted across from the left wing, and helped Winfield to save what otherwise would have been a try by tackling Deans before he grounded the ball, and, though a splendid effort was made by the centre threequarter to straggle over, timely reinforcements came to Morgan, and the ball was grounded between two and three feet from the line, though Deans considers he grounded the ball in goal. The incident was later the subject of different accounts, with Cliff Pritchard, Rhys Gabe and Welsh captain Gwyn Nicholls claiming to have been among the tacklers and in a good position to see that the ball was grounded short of the line, while Morgan believed a try should have been awarded. The All Blacks had further opportunities to score during the match, with Mynott held up over the line, Deans nearly scoring before being tackled by the Welsh, and McGregor nearly scoring except for a forward pass.

=== Welsh games ===
Following the Wales test, Dixon and the WRU continued to clash over referee appointments. The dispute escalated to the point where Dixon threatened to pull out of the All Blacks' remaining Welsh fixtures. The WRU responded by threatening to cancel the fixtures if their referee choices were rejected. The dispute was resolved when the chairman of the RFU, Rowland Hill, got the WRU to accept Gil Evans (a Welshman from Birmingham) as referee for the final three matches. Gil Evans had refereed the All Blacks versus England test and was well respected by the New Zealanders.

The All Blacks played Glamorgan in Swansea on 21 December. The All Blacks had the advantage of the wind in the first 30 minutes. Late in the first half Roberts worked a move from a scrum to pass to Smith, who passed to Harold Abbott. Abbott then passed back to Smith who scored in the corner. In the second half Glamorgan attacked but could not score, and late in the game the All Blacks scored tries to McDonald and Wallace to win 9–0.

Two days later the All Blacks faced Newport at the city's Athletic Ground. The All Blacks scored a try early to Eric Harper and Wallace recalled "It looked as though we were going to win comfortably." Wallace then scored a penalty for the All Blacks and they ended the first half ahead 6–0. Newport's Rowland Griffiths scored a penalty early in the second half but, despite their strong display in the second half, they could not score again and the All Blacks won 6–3.

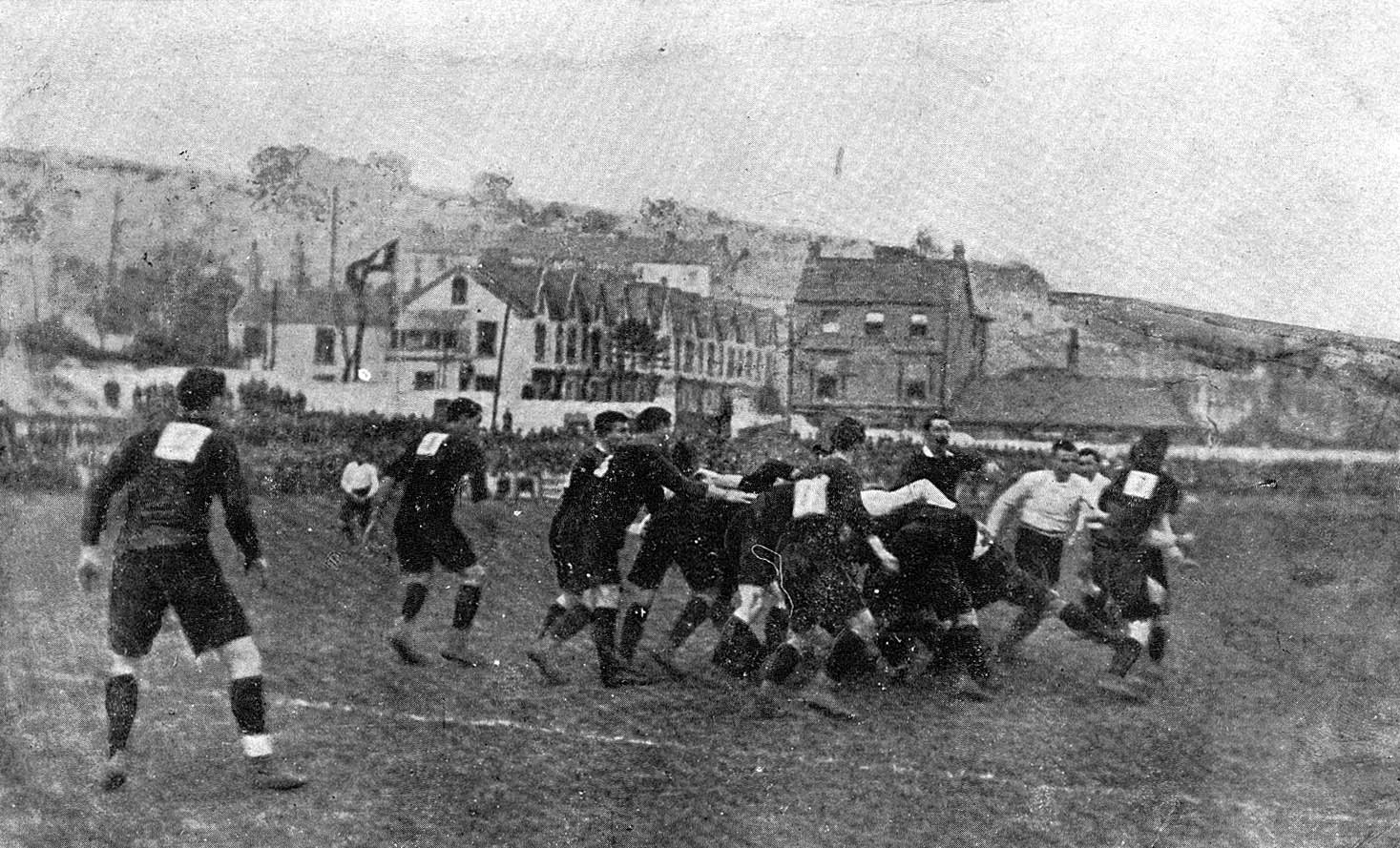
The match v. Swansea was the last in the British Isles

The next game was against Cardiff on 26 December. It was billed as a virtual second test against a side that boasted several test players. The match was played at Cardiff Arms Park in front of 50,000 spectators. After a missed drop goal and missed penalty Cardiff scored with a try to Nicholls that was set up by Gabe. The conversion was successful giving Cardiff a 5–0 lead. about 20 minutes into the match Jimmie O'Sullivan broke his collarbone after being tackled heavily; as a result the All Blacks played the rest of the match with only 14 men. The All Blacks attacked with every opportunity they could and before half time Mona Thomson scored in the corner for the All Blacks. Wallace converted the try to leave the scores 5–5 at half time. For the first 30 minutes of the second half the two teams attacked one after the other. After Cardiff captain Percy Bush failed to force down a ball behind his own goal-line George Nicholson dived on the ball to score a try. Wallace converted to give the All Blacks a 10–5 lead. Cardiff responded by scoring a try themselves, but Winfield failed to convert it and the All Blacks won 10–8. The loss was Cardiff's only loss of the season, and the next year they defeated the touring South Africans 17–0.

The All Blacks' last match in the British Isles was against Swansea at Saint Helen's Ground on 30 December. Swansea had only lost once in over two seasons (to Cardiff) and were the champion club team of Great Britain. Wallace said of the match "This was the thirty-second match of the tour and our hearts rejoiced at the thought that this was to be the last." The first half was mainly spent in All Blacks territory as they struggled to gain ground kicking into a strong wind and, after 25 minutes, Swansea scored a try through Fred Scrine that was unconverted. The half finished 3–0 to Swansea. The All Blacks playing with the wind to their backs nearly scored a try to McGregor but he was ruled to have stepped out. However, soon after, Wallace gained possession and ran towards Swansea's 25-yard line before kicking a drop-goal in the strong wind to give the All Blacks a 4–3 lead. The All Blacks then kept forcing Swansea back with kick after kick for the next 15 minutes to win the match 4–3.

The loss to Wales and the fact that they had only narrowly avoided losing to all of the Welsh club teams confirmed Wales as the pre-eminent rugby force of this era.

=== France and North America ===
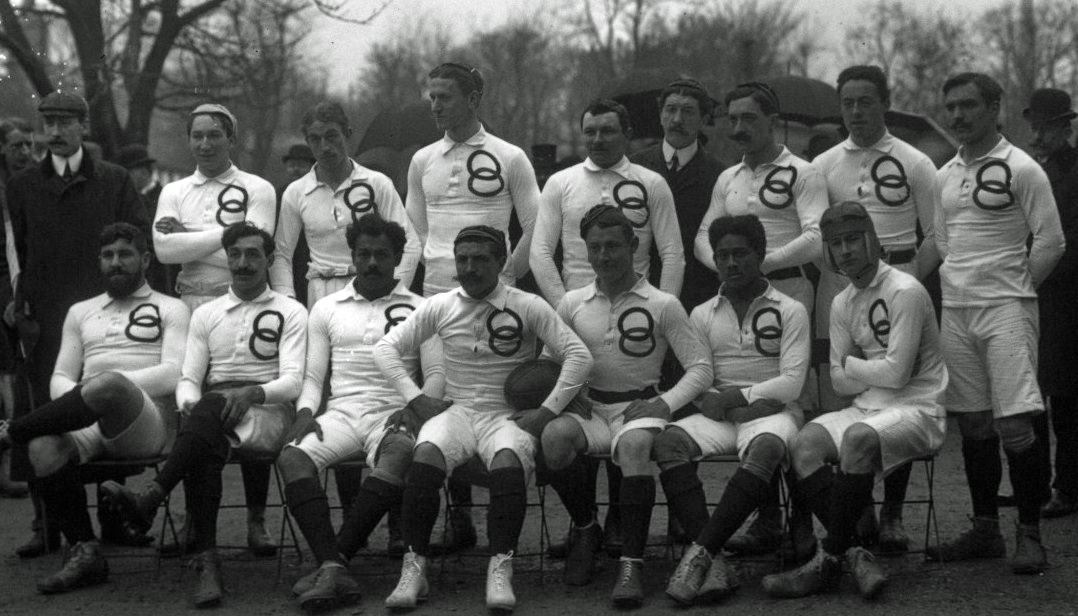
The original France XV v New Zealand, 1 January 1906, Paris

The All Blacks travelled to Paris on New Year's Eve and on 1 January faced France at Parc des Princes. The match was France's first test ever. French captain Henri Amand gave the All Blacks choice of ends and the kick off. Although the All Blacks dominated, France scored a try to Noel Cessieux in the first half; the half ended 18–3 to the All Blacks. Georges Jérôme then scored for France after the break to make it 18–8 for the All Blacks. The All Blacks ended up scoring another six tries for a total of ten, and a 38–8 win. The eight points, and two tries scored by France were as many as any team in the British Isles had against the All Blacks.

After spending several days sight seeing around Paris, the All Blacks returned to London. Instead of returning to New Zealand directly, they discovered that New Zealand Prime Minister Richard Seddon had organised for the team to travel home via the United States. Although the team wanted to return home immediately, Seddon insisted. The All Blacks had two weeks before they departed. Many of them stayed with friends or relatives, while Stead and Gallaher wrote The Complete Rugby Footballer. The team reassembled on 19 January and were farewelled by a dinner with the London New Zealand Society before departing Southampton on the SS New York the next day.

After arriving in New York City, they stayed for several days and an exhibition game was organised. The match was played in Brooklyn and was supposed to be New Zealand versus New York, however several New Zealanders played for New York to make up their numbers. Despite this New Zealand won the match. The team then travelled to San Francisco, via the Niagara Falls, Chicago, and the Grand Canyon. In San Francisco they played two matches against British Columbia; the first won 43–6 and the second 65–6. From there they sailed back to New Zealand.

== Innovations and tactics ==
The Original All Blacks introduced several innovations to rugby in France and the British Isles. At the time of their tour many critics in the Northern Hemisphere blamed the use of the wing–forward for the All Blacks success. These critics claimed this player—who fed the ball into the scrum—would obstruct opposition players, and that the only reason they were not being penalised was due to poor refereeing. Their success however was due to a combination of factors, the most important being the team's discipline and organisation, which was described at the time as a scientific approach.

Each forward in the team had a specific role in the scrum; they would each have a predetermined position within the scrum. This was different from their opposition— their forwards' position in a scrum was determined by the order in which they arrived. This was described as "first-up, first-down", and meant that the All Blacks were better drilled—giving them a significant advantage. The All Blacks had also practised their line-outs, and as a result had a very good understanding between the player that threw in the line-out ball, and the player who was supposed to receive it.

The All Blacks back-line formation was also different from that in Britain. They played two five-eighths, (Note: This is similar to a fly-half – which is the common term for the position outside New Zealand—see Rugby union positions#Names of positions.) a position invented in New Zealand, that refers to the player between the half-back and three-quarters. (Note: A half-back is 4/8, and three-quarters is 6/8, therefore a player between them is 5/8 or five-eighths.) These two five-eighths gave the All Blacks a defensive advantage. The British press were also surprised to see All Blacks fullback Billy Wallace attacking so often—They had generally viewed the fullback as a defensive position. The All Blacks also thought that every player, whether a back or a forward, should make themselves available to take a pass in support of an attacking player. The teams they encountered had forwards that understood their main role of winning possession for their backs, but would not support them when attacking.

The other major factor that helped the All Blacks to success was their superior fitness. In New Zealand each half was 45 minutes, not 35 like in Britain. As well as that, the All Blacks spent much time on fitness. This enabled them to play with speed much longer than their opposition.

== Results ==
Scores and results list New Zealand's points tally first.

Northern Hemisphere tour results, with test matches in bold.
Opposing Team	For	Against	Date	Venue	Status
Devon	55	4	16 September 1905	County Ground, Exeter	Tour match
Cornwall	41	0	21 September 1905	Recreation Ground, Camborne	Tour match
Bristol	41	0	23 September 1905	Memorial Ground, Bristol	Tour match
Northampton	32	0	28 September 1905	Northampton Ground, Northampton	Tour match
Leicester	28	0	1 October 1905	Welford Road, Leicester	Tour match
Middlesex	34	0	4 October 1905	Stamford Bridge, London	Tour match
Durham	16	3	7 October 1905	Hollow Drift, Durham	Tour match
Hartlepool Clubs	63	0	11 October 1905	Hartlepool Rovers' Ground, Hartlepool	Tour match
Northumberland	31	0	14 October 1905	Percy Park RFC Ground, North Shields	Tour match
Gloucester	44	0	19 October 1905	Kingsholm, Gloucester	Tour match
Somerset	23	0	21 October 1905	Jarvis's Field, Taunton	Tour match
Devonport Albion	21	3	25 October 1905	Rectory Ground, Devonport Plymouth	Tour match
Midland Counties	21	5	28 October 1905	Welford Road, Leicester	Tour match
Surrey	11	0	1 November 1905	Richmond Athletic Ground, London	Tour match
Blackheath	32	0	4 November 1905	Rectory Field, London	Tour match
Oxford University	47	0	7 November 1905	Iffley Road, Oxford	Tour match
Cambridge University	14	0	9 November 1905	Grange Road, Cambridge	Tour match
Richmond	17	0	11 November 1905	Richmond Athletic Ground, London	Tour match
Bedford XV	41	0	15 November 1905	Goldington Road, Bedford	Tour match
**Scotland**	**12**	**7**	**18 November 1905**	**Inverleith, Edinburgh**	Test match
West of Scotland	22	0	22 November 1905	Hampden Park, Glasgow	Tour match
**Ireland**	**15**	**0**	**25 November 1905**	**Lansdowne Road, Dublin**	Test match
Munster	33	0	28 November 1905	Market's Field, Limerick	Tour match
**England**	**15**	**0**	**2 December 1905**	**Crystal Palace, London**	Test match
Cheltenham	18	0	6 December 1905	Athletic and Recreation Ground, Cheltenham	Tour match
Cheshire	34	0	9 December 1905	Birkenhead Park, Birkenhead	Tour match
Yorkshire	40	0	13 December 1905	Headingley, Leeds	Tour match
**Wales**	**0**	**3**	**16 December 1905**	**Cardiff Arms Park, Cardiff**	Test match
Glamorgan	9	0	21 December 1905	St Helen's, Swansea	Tour match
Newport	6	3	23 December 1905	Athletic Ground, Newport	Tour match
Cardiff	10	8	26 December 1905	Cardiff Arms Park, Cardiff	Tour match
Swansea	4	3	30 December 1905	St Helen's, Swansea	Tour match
**France**	**38**	**8**	**1 January 1906**	**Stade Colombes, Paris**	Test match
British Columbia	43	6	10 February 1906	University of California Ground, Berkeley	Tour match
British Columbia	65	6	13 February 1906	Recreation Park, San Francisco	Tour match
Total Points	976	59			

== Squad ==
The squad, manager, and coach for the Northern Hemisphere tour:

Name	Position	Province	Tour points
George Gillett	Fullback	Canterbury	18
Billy Wallace	center	Wellington	246
Duncan McGregor	center	Wellington	50
Ernie Booth	center	Otago	17
George Smith	Three-quarters	Auckland	57
Harold Abbott	wing	Taranaki	47
Hector (Mona) Thomson	wing	Wanganui	44
Eric Harper	center	Canterbury	24
Jimmy Hunter	Five-eighths	Taranaki	129
Simon Mynott	Five-eighths	Taranaki	49
Bob Deans	Five-eighths	Canterbury	60
Billy Stead	Five-eighths	Southland	33
Fred Roberts	Halfback	Wellington	48
Steve Casey	Forward	Otago	0
John Corbett	Forward	West Coast	0
Bill Cunningham	Forward	Auckland	22
Frank Glasgow	Forward	Taranaki	37
Bill Glenn	Forward	Taranaki	0
Bill Johnston	Forward	Otago	9
Bill Mackrell	Forward	Auckland	3
Alex McDonald	Forward	Otago	12
Fred Newton	Forward	Canterbury – West Coast	3
George Nicholson	Forward	Auckland	18
Jimmie O'Sullivan	Forward	Taranaki	3
Charlie Seeling	Forward	Auckland	24
George Tyler	Forward	Auckland	18
Dave Gallaher (Captain)	Forward	Auckland	5

Manager – George Dixon
Coach – Jimmy Duncan

== See also ==
- 1888–89 New Zealand Native football team
- History of rugby union matches between All Blacks and France

== Sources ==
Books and articles

- Elliot, Matt (2012). Dave Gallaher – The Original All Black Captain. HarperCollinsPublishers. ISBN 978-1-86950-968-2.
- McCrystal, John (2005). The Originals. Auckland, New Zealand: Random House New Zealand. ISBN 1-86941-729-1.
- McLean, Terry (1959). Great Days in New Zealand Rugby. Wellington, New Zealand: A. H. & A. W. Reed.
- Palenski, Ron (2003). Century in Black – 100 Years of All Black Test Rugby. Hodder Moa Beckett Publishers Limited. ISBN 1-86958-937-8.
- Ryan, Greg (2005). The Contest for Rugby Supremacy – Accounting for the 1905 All Blacks. Canterbury University Press. ISBN 1-877257-36-2.
- Tobin, Christopher (2005). The Original All Blacks 1905–06. Auckland, New Zealand: Hodder Moa Beckett. ISBN 1-86958-995-5.

News

- Jenkins, Graham (3 September 2011). "World Cup whistle is dusted off". espnscrum.com.

Web

- "1st All Black Test: 45th All Black Game". allblacks.com.
- "2nd All Black Test: 47th All Black Game". allblacks.com.
- "4th All Black Test: 75th All Black Game". allblacks.com.
- "5th All Black Test: 77th All Black Game". allblacks.com.
- "6th All Black Test: 79th All Black Game". allblacks.com.
- "7th All Black Test: 83rd All Black Game". allblacks.com.
- "8th All Black Test: 88th All Black Game". allblacks.com.
- "56th All Black Game". allblacks.com.
- "57th All Black Game". allblacks.com.
- "58th All Black Game". allblacks.com.
- "59th All Black Game". allblacks.com.
- "60th All Black Game". allblacks.com.
- "61st All Black Game". allblacks.com.
- "62nd All Black Game". allblacks.com.
- "63rd All Black Game". allblacks.com.
- "64th All Black Game". allblacks.com.
- "65th All Black Game". allblacks.com.
- "66th All Black Game". allblacks.com.
- "67th All Black Game". allblacks.com.
- "68th All Black Game". allblacks.com.
- "72nd All Black Game". allblacks.com.
- "73rd All Black Game". allblacks.com.
- "74th All Black Game". allblacks.com.
- "76th All Black Game". allblacks.com.
- "78th All Black Game". allblacks.com.
- "80th All Black Game". allblacks.com.
- "81st All Black Game". allblacks.com.
- "82nd All Black Game". allblacks.com.
- "85th All Black Game". allblacks.com.
- "86th All Black Game". allblacks.com.
- "87th All Black Game". allblacks.com.
- "The 1905/06 'Originals'". New Zealand Rugby Museum.
- "All Blacks – The Name?". New Zealand Rugby Museum. Archived from the original on 14 October 2008.
- "in Australia and New Zealand". allblacks.com.
- "In the British Isles, France and North America". allblacks.com.
- "The Haka – In The Beginning". New Zealand Rugby Union. Archived from the original on 14 October 2008.
