= Eric Harper =

NZ international rugby union player (1877–1918)

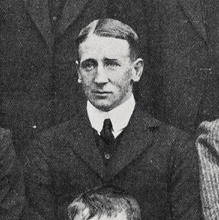
- Born: Eric Tristram Harper; 1 December 1877 Papanui, Christchurch, New Zealand
- Died: 30 April 1918 (aged 40) Jerusalem, Palestine
- Height: 1.80 m (5 ft 11 in)
- Weight: 80 kg (180 lb)
- School: Christchurch Boys' High School St Patrick's College, Wellington
- Notable relative(s): Henry Harper (grandfather); George Harper (father); Leonard Harper (uncle); A.P. Harper (cousin)

Rugby union career
- Position: Second five-eighth and centre
Amateur team(s)
Years	Team	Apps	(Points)
- Christchurch
Provincial / State sides
Years	Team	Apps	(Points)
1900–05	Canterbury	14	
International career
Years	Team	Apps	(Points)
1904–06	New Zealand	2	(6)

Eric Tristram Harper (1 December 1877 – 30 April 1918) was a New Zealand sportsman and lawyer, who is most notable for playing rugby union for the New Zealand national rugby union team and in 1905 became one of the Original All Blacks when he toured Britain and Ireland with Dave Gallaher's team.

A keen athlete, Harper was a hurdler at national level, and also played cricket representing Canterbury. In 1918, while serving in the New Zealand Expeditionary Force during World War I, he was killed in action in Jerusalem; becoming one of 11 New Zealand rugby internationals to die during the conflict.

== Personal history ==
Harper was born in the Christchurch suburb of Papanui in 1877 into a prominent pioneering family: his grandfather was Henry Harper, the first bishop of Christchurch; one of his uncles was Leonard Harper, a New Zealand member of Parliament; and his father was Sir George Harper, a prominent lawyer. He was first educated at St Patrick’s College Wellington (1889-1892) This may be because, there was no Catholic secondary school in Christchurch until 1911, when St. Bede’s opened in Ferry Road. Then he was educated at Christchurch Boys' High School. A sportsman of some note he won the first national track title in 1901 in the 440 yards hurdle and the next year won the 880 yards hurdles. Harper was also a keen mountaineer and made important discoveries in the Southern Alps.

In January 1905, he and Guy Dobrée Pascoe (father of Paul and John Pascoe) joined his father's law firm as partners, with the firm then known as George Harper, Son and Pascoe. The law firm's name remained in place until May 1919, when G. H. Buchanan joined his Ashburton legal practice with the firm and it was from then known as George Harper, Pascoe and Buchanan.

With the outbreak of the First World War, Harper joined the New Zealand Expeditionary Force, a military unit sent from New Zealand to fight for the British. Reaching the rank of Sergeant Major he served in the Canterbury Mounted Rifles division and was posted to Palestine. On 30 April 1918, while his unit was coming under artillery bombardment in Jerusalem, he attempted to quiet horses and was killed in the attack. He is commemorated at the Jerusalem British War Cemetery.

== Rugby career ==
Harper first came to note as a rugby player when he represented the Christchurch team. In 1900 he was selected to play for Canterbury Province. On 6 August 1904, Harper faced his first international opposition when he played for a combined Canterbury / West Coast team against the touring British Isles team. Seven days later Harper was selected for his first international match for New Zealand, facing the same British Isles team. The game ended in a 9–3 victory for the New Zealand team.

Despite the victory, Harper received mixed reviews, and was not chosen for the preliminary tour of Australia, in preparation for the main tour to Britain and Ireland. When the full squad left for Europe, Harper was amongst the team, but was injured in an early encounter, playing in only four of the first 17 British matches. Though Harper did score a try in the match against Newport. The tour took in six international games, the warm-up in Australia, four matches against the Home Nation teams and a final game in France. Harper was only chosen for the encounter against France, but was part of a high scoring three-quarters line, that managed seven tries and three conversions between them. Harper scored two of the tries against France. During the tour Harper acquired the nickname "Aristocratic Eric" due to his wealthy background. He used his wealth to good effect by financially supporting his less well off teammates. He never represented his country again.
