= Cliff Pritchard =

Welsh rugby player

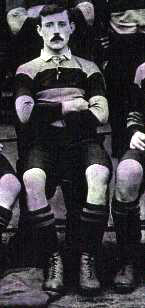
- Pritchard in Newport strip
- Born: Clifford Charles Pritchard; 1 October 1881 Pontypool, Wales
- Died: 14 December 1954 (aged 73) Pontypool, Monmouthshire
- Occupation: undertaker

Rugby union career
- Position: Centre
Amateur team(s)
Years	Team	Apps	(Points)
1899-1906	Newport RFC		
1906	Pontypool RFC		
International career
Years	Team	Apps	(Points)
1904-1906	Wales	5	(6)

Cliff Pritchard (1881–1954) was a Welsh international centre who played club rugby for Newport RFC and Pontypool RFC. Pritchard was capped on five occasions and scored two tries for his country. He is best known as one of the Welsh squad that beat the 1905 touring All Blacks in the Match of the Century.

== International career ==
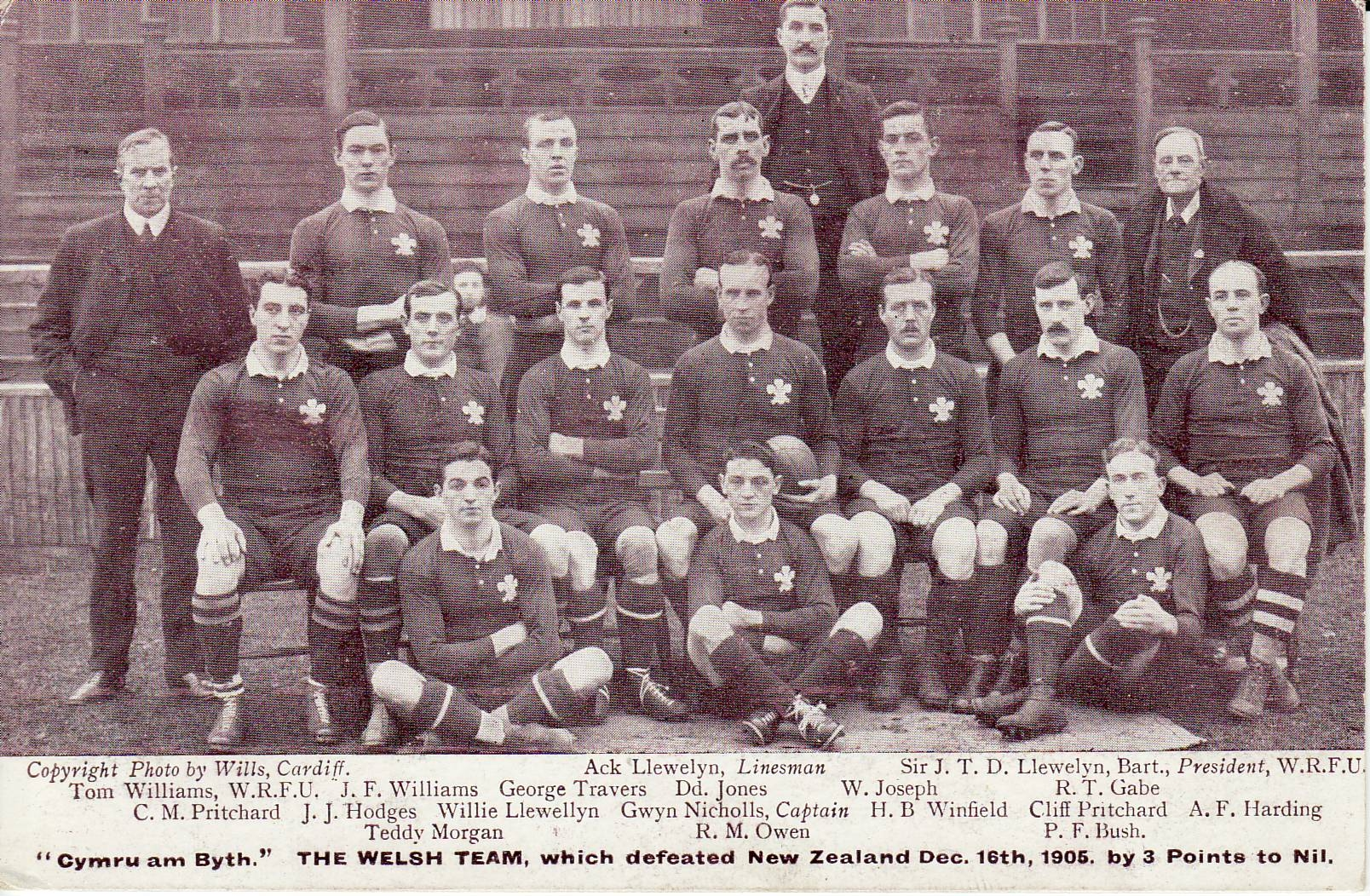
1905 Wales squad, Pritchard, middle row, second from right

Pritchard was first capped for his country in a winning game against Scotland in 1904; he was paired with seasoned international Rhys Gabe as a replacement for Gwyn Nicholls. His debut was reported in the South Wales Evening Post as "Once Pritchard got over early nervousness, he settled down to tackle well".

Pritchard was not the first choice for the famous Match of the Century against New Zealand in 1905, as Pritchard was a forward player and the role he was required to fill in at the edge of the scrum, for this particular game, required speed and vision. He was known by the Welsh as the 'extra back' as his role required him to play up close to the scrum in defence, but also as an additional prong of attack. On the day of the match against the All Blacks, Pritchard proved he had taken his role seriously and executed his position as a roving player to neutralise the New Zealand loose-head during scrum play with great skill. Pritchard was also part of the game's only try when he managed to collect a low pass from Dicky Owen, he drew the New Zealand centre Bob Deans and passed to Gabe, who in turn passed to the try scorer Teddy Morgan.

International matches played:

- England 1906
- Ireland 1904
- New Zealand 1905
- Scotland 1904, 1906

== Bibliography ==
- Parry-Jones, David (1999). Prince Gwyn, Gwyn Nicholls and the First Golden Era of Welsh Rugby. Bridgend: seren. ISBN 1-85411-262-7.
- Smith, David; Williams, Gareth (1980). Fields of Praise: The Official History of The Welsh Rugby Union. Cardiff: University of Wales Press. ISBN 0-7083-0766-3.
