= Fred Newton (rugby union) =

- Born: Frederick Newton; 7 May 1881 Christchurch, New Zealand
- Died: 10 December 1955 (aged 74) Christchurch, New Zealand
- Height: 1.82 m (6 ft 0 in)
- Weight: 95 kg (209 lb)
- Occupation: Railway worker

Rugby union career
- Position(s): Lock; Loose forward
Amateur team(s)
Years	Team	Apps	(Points)
1901, 1904	Linwood		
1908	White Star		
Provincial / State sides
Years	Team	Apps	(Points)
1901, 1904	Canterbury	7	
1908	Buller	1	
International career
Years	Team	Apps	(Points)
1905–06	New Zealand	3	(3)

Fred Newton (7 May 1881 – 10 December 1955) was a New Zealand rugby union player who represented the All Blacks between 1905 and 1906. His positions of choice were lock and loose forward.

He was born in Christchurch in 1881 and he died in Christchurch in 1955. His ashes were placed at Lancaster Park.

== Career ==
Newton had an unusual playing career.

Out of the Linwood club in Christchurch, he played just one game for the Canterbury provincial side in 1901. He did not play again until 1904 where he totalled a further 6 matches.

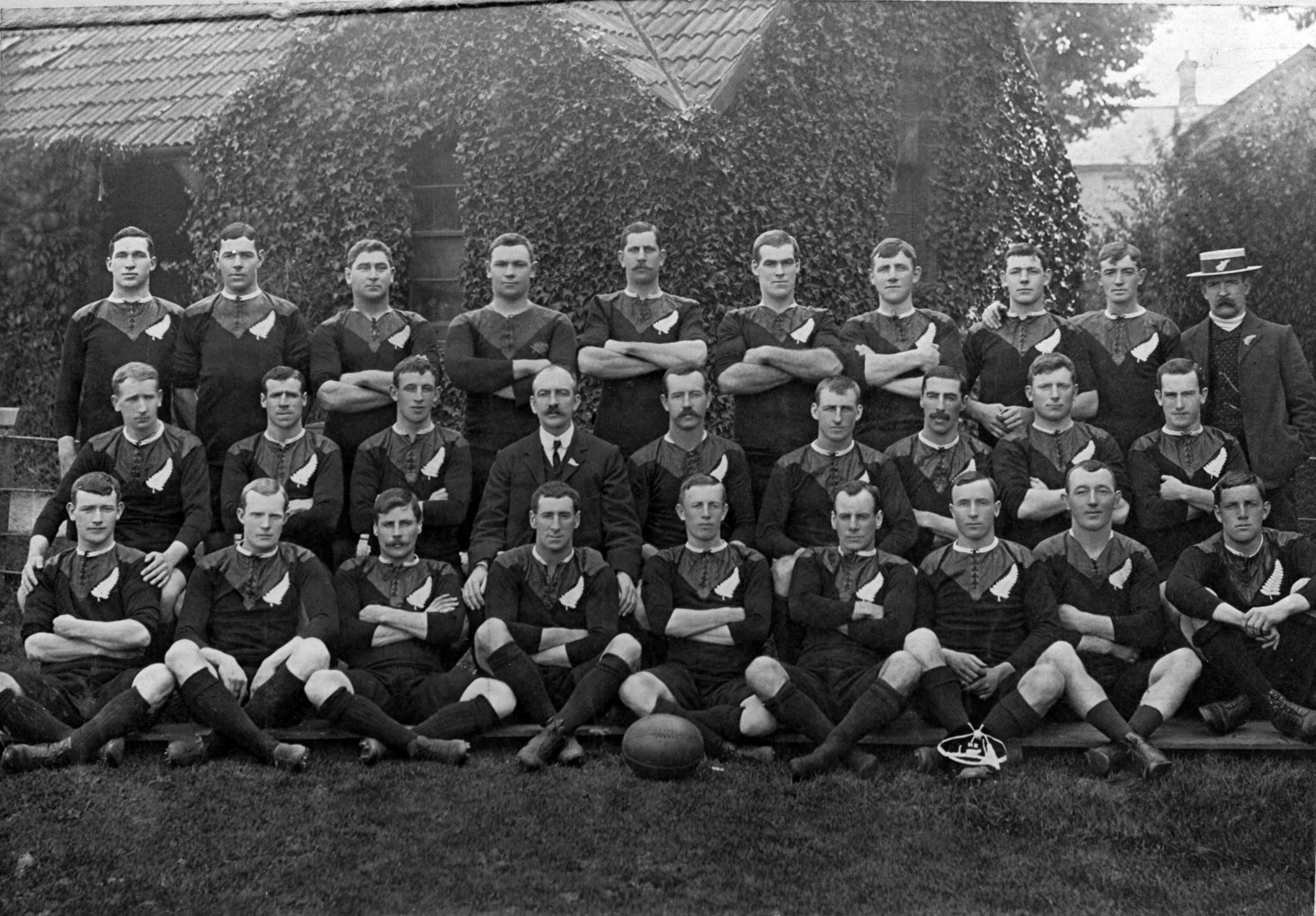
Newton and the other Original All Blacks. Newton is standing in the back row, fourth from left.

Newton was selected for the famous Original's tour of the Northern hemisphere. Before leaving Newton played in the three matches on the tour to Australia.

He was the heaviest player in the squad and because of that he was given the nickname, "Fatty".

An injury prevented Newton from appearing in the first eight matches, but he recovered to play in 16 games.

Although Bill Cunningham was preferred over Newton, Cunningham suffered injuries and then became sick preventing him from playing, thus Newton was selected in the teams for the test against England and the famous "Match of the Century" against Wales. Cunningham had recovered for the test against France but fortunately Newton was kept with Cunningham played as a loose forward.

Newton scored a try in the test against England.

After the tour Newton moved to Westport for his job working with the railways. He joined the White Star club in Westport. Ineligible for Canterbury, he played one final match for the Buller union, against Marlborough in 1908.

It was reported that Newton had no desire to train hard in order to keep fit otherwise he certainly would've played more 1st-class games.

He had lived for a number of years in Loburn, but died in Christchurch.

== Family ==
Newton was the grandfather of former All Black Ian MacRae's wife.
