= Fred Roberts (rugby union) =

NZ international rugby union player (1881-1956)

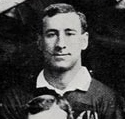
- Roberts in 1908
- Born: Frederick Roberts; 7 April 1882 Wellington, New Zealand
- Died: 21 July 1956 (aged 75) Wellington, New Zealand
- School: Thorndon School

Rugby union career
- Position: Halfback
Amateur team(s)
Years	Team	Apps	(Points)
- Oriental
Provincial / State sides
Years	Team	Apps	(Points)
1901–12	Wellington	58	
1902	South Island (Note: Despite only ever playing provincially for Wellington, Roberts appeared for the South Island in 1902 as an emergency replacement.)	1	
International career
Years	Team	Apps	(Points)
1905–10	New Zealand	12	(11)

Frederick Roberts (7 April 1882 – 21 July 1956) was a rugby union footballer who played for the New Zealand national team, commonly called the All Blacks. Playing at halfback, he played for the 1905 Original All Blacks, the first New Zealand representative team to tour the British Isles. He was the only halfback taken on the tour, and played in 28 of their 32 matches in the British Isles. New Zealand rugby historian Winston McCarthy wrote of Roberts that he was "a superb passer, a judicious runner from the scrum, and excellent two-foot kicker and a giant on defence." Roberts continued to be selected by the All Blacks until 1910, when he captained the New Zealand team on their tour of Australia.

== Original All Blacks ==
Having represented Wellington since 1901, Roberts was selected for the historic 1905–06 New Zealand team to tour the British Isles. This was the first New Zealand representative side to visit Britain and Ireland, and the team became known as the "Original All Blacks". Roberts was the only halfback selected in the squad and this did raise concerns in the press over what would happen if he was injured. However Roberts ended up playing more matches than any other All Black on tour, 30. The side had enormous success, winning 35 of their 36 matches. Their only loss was the famous "Match of the Century", a narrow 3–0 defeat to Wales. Roberts played in that Test match, as well as the Tests against England, Ireland and Scotland. He did not play against France, with Billy Stead taking his place. Of their 32 matches in the British Isles New Zealand scored 830 points and conceded 39, and overall they scored 976 points and conceded only 59.

After the British Isles leg of the tour, the team traveled through North America to San Francisco. After playing two matches against British Columbia there, the team returned to New Zealand. Roberts was ill however, and remained in San Francisco for several weeks with Wellington teammate Billy Wallace. After surgery to remove his infected tonsils, Roberts recovered well enough to travel back to New Zealand; only a few weeks after he and Wallace departed, the 1906 San Francisco earthquake struck, destroying the hotel in which they'd been staying.

== Later career ==
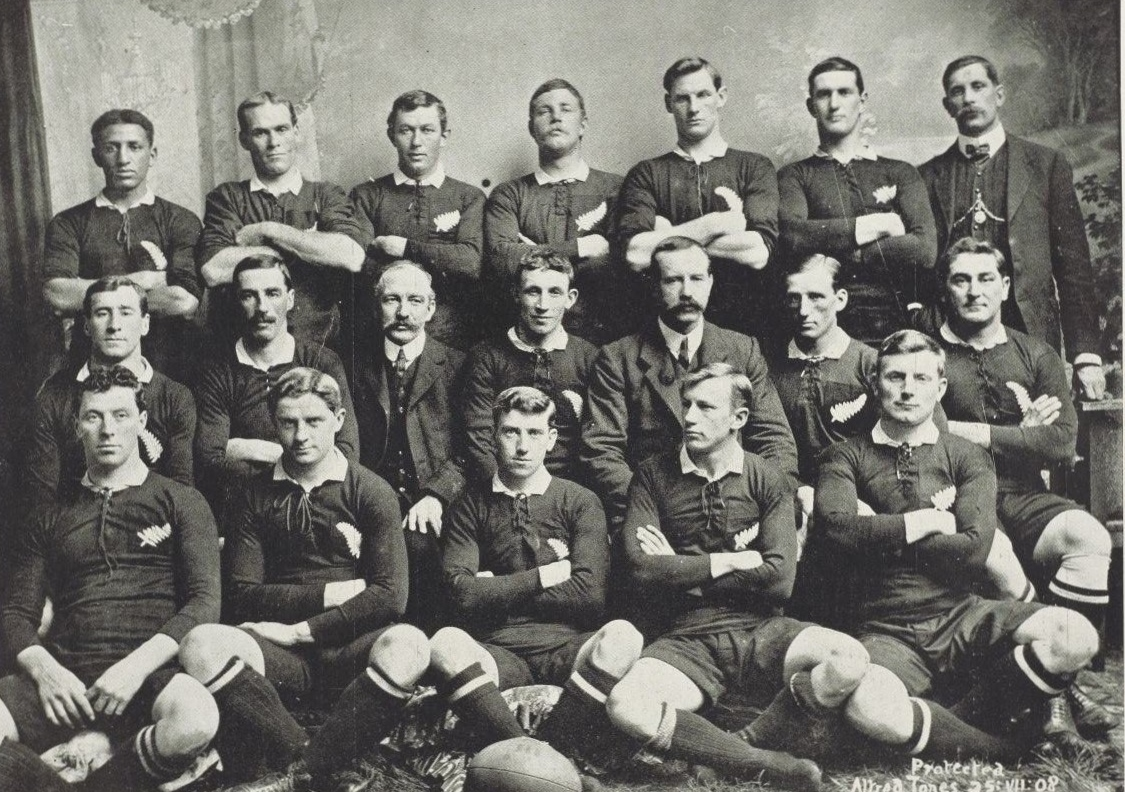
The 1908 New Zealand side that played the touring Anglo-Welsh. Roberts is seated in the middle row on the far left.

Roberts continued to play for both Wellington and New Zealand after the tour. He toured with New Zealand to Australia in 1907, and in 1908 played two Tests against the Anglo-Welsh team in New Zealand. The Anglo-Welsh played three Tests against the All Blacks while on tour, but Roberts missed the second due to injury. The first and third were comfortably won by New Zealand, 32–5 and 29–0.

Roberts' last appearance for the All Blacks was on their 1910 tour of Australia. He was appointed captain, and appeared in all three Test matches. The New Zealand side was relatively inexperienced, only seven had appeared for New Zealand before, but they won the Test series 2–1 after winning the third Test 28–13. He continued to play provincially for Wellington until 1912, and was involved with his Wellington club Oriental for a number of years. His record of 58 appearances for Wellington was the team's record until overtaken by Ranji Wilson.

== Sources ==
- Luxford, Bob. "Fred Roberts". allblacks.com. New Zealand Rugby Museum.
- McCarthy, Winston (1968). Haka! The All Blacks Story. London: Pelham Books.
- Swan, Arthur C.; Jackson, Gordon F. W. (1952). Wellington's Rugby History 1870 – 1950. Wellington, New Zealand: A. H. & A. W. Reed.
- Verdon, Paul (2000). Born to Lead – The Untold Story of the All Black Test Captains. Auckland, New Zealand: Celebrity Books. ISBN 1-877252-05-0.
- "The 1905/06 'Originals'". New Zealand Rugby Museum.
