= Steve Casey (rugby union) =

- Born: Stephen Timothy Casey; 24 December 1882 Dunedin, Otago, New Zealand
- Died: 10 August 1960 (aged 77) Dunedin, Otago, New Zealand
- Height: 1.78 m (5 ft 10 in)
- Weight: 78 kg (12 st 4 lb)
- School: Christian Brothers School

Rugby union career
- Position: Hooker
Amateur team(s)
Years	Team	Apps	(Points)
- Southern
Provincial / State sides
Years	Team	Apps	(Points)
1903–04	Otago		
International career
Years	Team	Apps	(Points)
1905–08	All Blacks	38	(0)

Stephen Timothy "Steve" Casey (24 December 1882 – 10 August 1960) was a New Zealand international rugby player. He was a member of the All Blacks in 1905–1908 (an "original" All Black), playing in the hooker position.

== Early life ==
Casey was born in Dunedin, New Zealand and was educated at Christian Brothers School where he played rugby.

== Senior rugby ==
Casey played for the Southern Rugby Football Club from 1900, captaining the seniors in 1906 and 1913, and was assistant coach of the seniors that won the championship in 1915 and coach in 1922. He represented Otago in 57 matches between 1903–04 and from 1906 until 1913. He played four matches for the South Island Team in the years 1904–07.

== All Blacks ==
Casey was selected for the 1905–06 Original All Blacks tour. He played against Scotland, Ireland, England and the famous "Match of the Century" against Wales. He also played against Australia in 1907 and in the first test against the Anglo-Welsh team in 1908. He played 38 matches (including 8 tests) for the All Blacks but never scored a point for them.
