= Duncan McGregor =

NZ dual-code rugby international footballer (1881–1947)

Personal information
- Born: 16 July 1881 Kaiapoi, Canterbury region, New Zealand
- Died: 11 March 1947 (aged 65) Timaru, Canterbury Region, New Zealand

Playing information
- Height: 175 cm (5 ft 9 in)
- Weight: 72 kg (11 st 5 lb)

Rugby union
- Position: Wing, Centre
Club
Years	Team	Pld	T	G	FG	P
1900–1903	Canterbury
1904–1906	Wellington
	Total	0	0	0	0	0
Representative
Years	Team	Pld	T	G	FG	P
1903–1905	New Zealand	4	6	0	0	18

Rugby league
- Position: Wing, Centre
Club
Years	Team	Pld	T	G	FG	P
1908	Merthyr Tydfil	3	1	0	0	3
Representative
Years	Team	Pld	T	G	FG	P
1907–08	New Zealand	8	6	2	0	22

Duncan McGregor (16 July 1881 – 11 March 1947), was a New Zealand rugby union and rugby league footballer. He was a member of the legendary 1905 Original All Blacks and later converted to rugby league when he went on the 1907 New Zealand league tour of Britain and Australia. He stayed in Britain following the 1907–08 tour, and opened a sport store as well as playing for Merthyr Tydfil RLFC. He returned to New Zealand after five years and continued to be involved in rugby league as an administrator and official.

== Early life ==
Duncan McGregor was the son of Alexander McGregor and his wife Barbara McGregor, née Gudex. Duncan was born on 16 July 1881 at Kaiapoi. His father Alexander McGregor was a railway worker, working for the New Zealand Railways Department.

HIs father, Alexander McGregor arrived in New Zealand on [name of ship] in [year]. His mother, Barbara Gudex, along with her brother MIchael Gudex left Kindenheim, Germany in 1866 and arrived at Lyttelton on the "Mermaid", on 5 January 1867.

== Rugby union ==
McGregor made his provincial rugby union début playing for Canterbury in 1900 when he was just 19. In 1902 he had a stellar season, scoring 17 tries for Canterbury and 2 for South Island in just 10 first class matches. McGregor was subsequently selected for the 1903 New Zealand rugby union tour of Australia and won his first Test cap for New Zealand on 15 August 1903 against Australia.

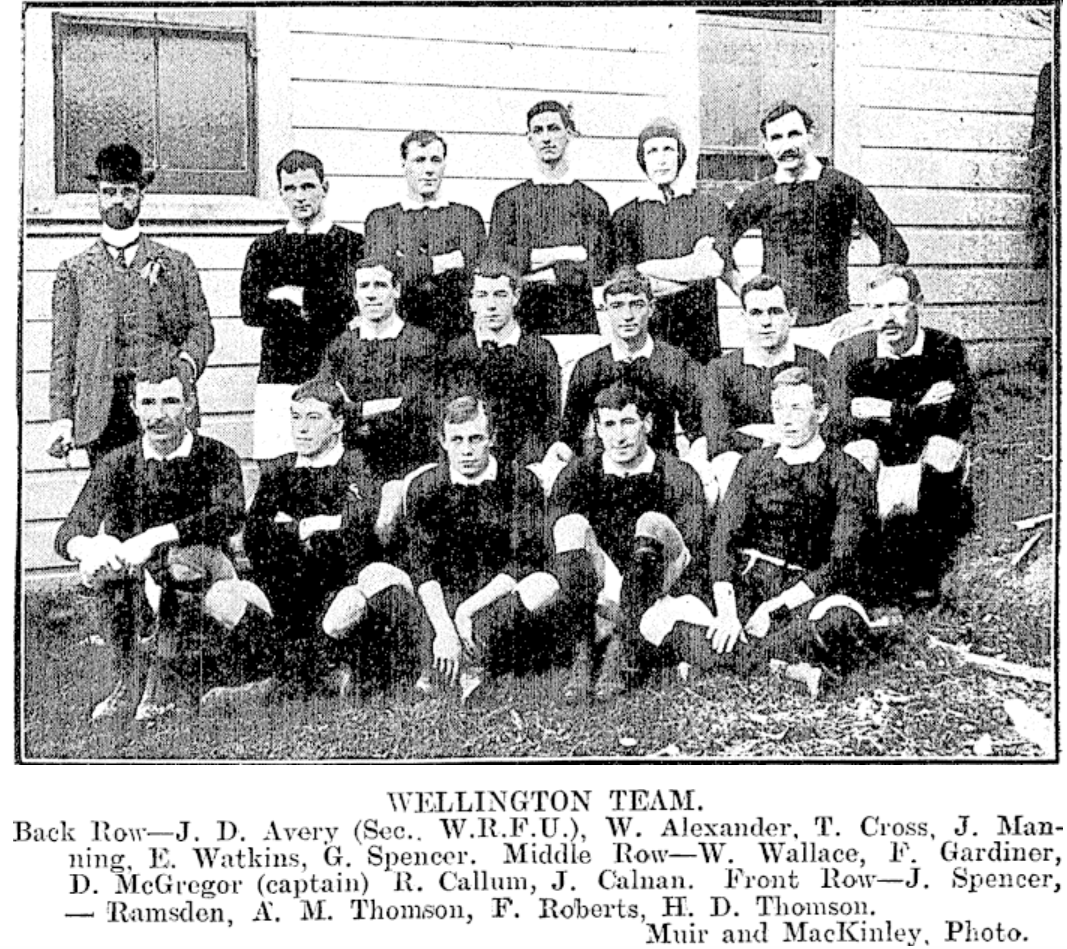
The Wellington team which defeated Wairarapa 62-9 on 4 June 1906.

He transferred to Wellington in 1904 due to his employment taking him to Petone, there he joined the Petone Rugby Club and was later one of six players from the club that made the 1907-08 tour. McGregor represented Wellington and the North Island and retained his place in the All Blacks in 1904 and in 1905 was selected for the All Blacks tour of Great Britain. While on tour, the British press dubbed him the "Flying Scotsman" in recognition of his speed. While on tour he scored four times in one match in a Test match against the English and played in the famous Match of the Century against Wales.

In all first class rugby union McGregor scored 66 tries in just 59 games.

== Rugby league ==
In 1907 McGregor joined the professional New Zealand team that toured Great Britain and Australia; this team played the sport now known as rugby league. He was a strong supporter of the tour from the outset and was one of the tours selectors, served on the tours Management committee and had a role in coaching the backs. However, while on tour, he could not consistently make the first team and played in many of the mid-week games. McGregor only ended up playing in one of the eight test matches on tour.

He opted not to return to New Zealand, instead staying behind in Great Britain to open a sports store in Gloucestershire and sign with the Merthyr Tydfil club. In 1912 he suffered an ankle injury and retired from the game, opting to return to New Zealand.

== Later years ==
After returning to New Zealand McGregor stayed involved with rugby league, becoming a referee and a national selector. In 1920 he was made a life member of the New Zealand Rugby League.

He died 11 March 1947 in Timaru, and is buried at Timaru Cemetery, Timaru.
