= Ernie Booth =

New Zealand international rugby union footballer and coach

- Born: Ernest Edward Booth; 24 February 1876 Teschmakers, North Otago, New Zealand
- Died: 18 October 1935 (aged 59) Christchurch, New Zealand
- Height: 1.70 m (5 ft 7 in)
- Weight: 74 kg (163 lb)
- Occupation(s): Journalist, rugby union coach

Rugby union career
- Position(s): Fullback, three-quarter
Provincial / State sides
Years	Team	Apps	(Points)
1896–1908	Otago	28	
1908–1909	New South Wales		
1909	Leicester Tigers	5	
International career
Years	Team	Apps	(Points)
1905–1907	New Zealand	3	(0)

Ernest Edward Booth (24 February 1876 – 18 October 1935) was a New Zealand rugby union player. A fullback and three-quarter, Booth represented Otago at a provincial level between 1896 and 1907, and was a member of the New Zealand national side, the All Blacks, from 1905 to 1907. He played 24 matches for the All Blacks including three internationals, and was a member of the Original All Blacks on their 1905–06 tour of the British Isles, France and North America.

Booth moved to Sydney and played for New South Wales between 1908 and 1909. He toured as a press correspondent with the Australian rugby union team on their 1908–09 tour of Britain, and while there played 5 matches for Leicester becoming the first non-British international to play for the club. He served with the Australian forces during World War I as secretary in the YMCA.

In the 1920s, Booth was appointed as a professional coach by the Southland Rugby Union, developing the game in that region. In 1924, he accompanied the All Blacks on their tour of Britain, Ireland and France as the representative of the Australian Press Association. He then toured with New Zealand Māori on the British and French legs of their 1926–27 tour, reporting for newspapers in the North Island.

Booth died in the Christchurch suburb of St Albans on 18 October 1935, and he was buried in the Oamaru Old Cemetery.
