= Billy Wallace (rugby union) =

NZ international rugby union player (1878-1972)

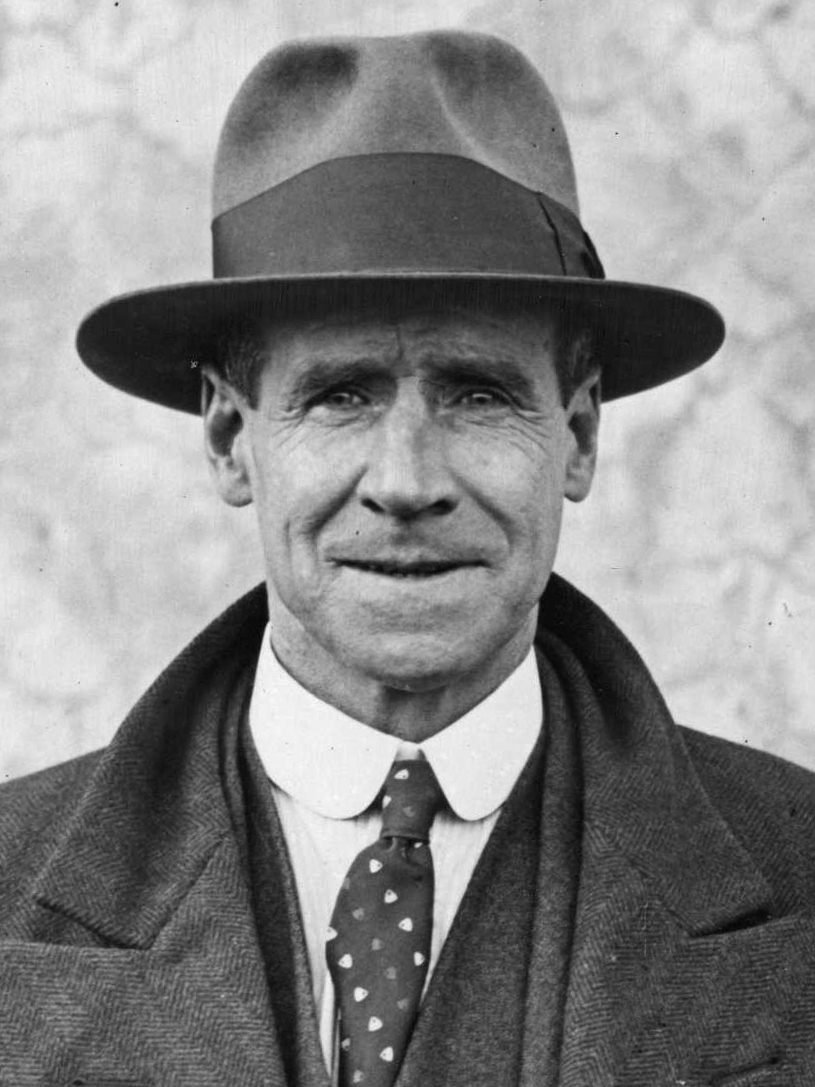
- Wallace in 1934
- Born: William Joseph Wallace; 2 August 1878 Wellington, New Zealand
- Died: 2 March 1972 (aged 93) Wellington, New Zealand
- Height: 1.73 m (5 ft 8 in)
- Weight: 76 kg (168 lb)
- Occupation: Foundryman

Rugby union career
- Position: Utility back
Provincial / State sides
Years	Team	Apps	(Points)
1897–99, 1901–08	Wellington	51	
1900	Otago		
International career
Years	Team	Apps	(Points)
1903–08	New Zealand	11	(50)

William Joseph Wallace (2 August 1878 – 2 March 1972) was a New Zealand rugby union footballer and foundryman.

== Personal life ==
Wallace was born in Wellington on 2 August 1878.

He attended Mount Cook Boys’ School.

After retiring from Rugby in 1908, he was awarded 400 gold sovereigns by the Wellington public, which he used to set up an Iron foundry. He worked at the foundry until he retired.

Billy Wallace married Jessie Mowatt, on 9 October 1911. They had two daughters and a son.

== Rugby career ==
=== Domestic career ===
Wallace started his rugby career playing for Pōneke Football Club. He was selected as centre for Wellington at the age of 19. One of his first games for Wellington was the infamous “Butcher’s Match” against Otago at Carrisbrook, where the Otago crowd taunted the Wellington team.

In 1900 Wallace moved to Dunedin and played for the Alhambra Rugby Football Club, and Otago provincial team. He then returned to Pōneke and Wellington for the 1901 season.

Wallace played for Wellington from 1901-1908, but did not play in the 1905 season. He also played for the North Island team for four seasons during this time.

Wallace finished his career with 527 first class points - the first New Zealander to break the career 500 point barrier.

=== International career ===
Wallace won his first Test cap for New Zealand on 15 August 1903 against Australia - the first official test played by a New Zealand team.

==== Originals ====
Wallace was a member of the legendary 1905 Original All Blacks and played in the famous Match of the Century against Wales. As fullback, Wallace was the highest scoring player on the tour - scoring 230 points from 23 tries, 72 kicked conversions, 3 penalty goals, and 2 drop goals. His 23 tries made him the second most prolific try scorer on the tour after Jimmy Hunter, who scored 42 tries.

==== Other tours ====
Wallace was a member of the All Blacks team which toured Australia in 1907, and the also played against the Anglo-Welsh team which toured New Zealand in 1908. He retired at the end of the Anglo-Welsh tour.

==== Career Matches ====
In total, Wallace played 51 matches for the All Blacks including 11 internationals. He had scored 379 points for New Zealand in total - a record which remained unbeaten until surpassed by Don Clark in the late 1950s.

=== Post-player rugby career ===
After his retirement as a player, Wallace stayed connected to the sport. He served as manager for All Black and Māori teams touring Australia, on the New Zealand Rugby Football Union’s management committee, and as a selector for the Wellington provincial team. He was appointed Wellington Rugby Football Union president in 1955.

== Honours ==
Wallace was made a Life Member of the Poneke club in 1929, and of the Wellington team in 1971.

He was added to the New Zealand Sports Hall of Fame in 1990.

== Death ==
Following the death of Loftus Armstrong in 1959, Wallace was the oldest living All Black - a distinction he held for the 13 years until he died in Wellington in 1972. He was buried at Karori Cemetery.

Records
Preceded by Loftus Armstrong	Oldest living All Black; 30 January 1959 – 2 March 1972	Succeeded by Frank Mitchinson
