= Simon Mynott =

- Born: Harry Jonas Mynott; 4 June 1876 Auckland, New Zealand
- Died: 2 January 1924 (aged 47) New Plymouth, New Zealand
- Height: 1.70 m (5 ft 7 in)
- Weight: 74 kg (163 lb)

Rugby union career
- Position: First five-eighth
Provincial / State sides
Years	Team	Apps	(Points)
1899–1911	Taranaki	71	
International career
Years	Team	Apps	(Points)
1905–10	New Zealand	8	(0)

Harry Jonas "Simon" Mynott (4 June 1876 – 2 January 1924) was a New Zealand rugby union player. A first five-eighth, Mynott represented Taranaki at a provincial level, and was a member of the New Zealand national side, the All Blacks, from 1905 to 1910. Mynott played 39 matches for the All Blacks, twice as captain. He played in eight internationals including the Match of the Century against Wales. In all he scored 58 points for the team, including 18 tries. Mynott went on to serve as a Taranaki selector between 1910 and 1914, and an All Black selector in 1913.

Mynott died in New Plymouth on 2 January 1924, and was buried at Te Henui Cemetery.
