= Frank Glasgow =

- Born: Francis Turnbull Glasgow; 17 August 1880 Dunedin, New Zealand
- Died: 20 February 1939 (aged 58) Wellington, New Zealand
- Height: 1.78 m (5 ft 10 in)
- Weight: 84 kg (185 lb)
- School: Wellington College
- Occupation: Bank manager

Rugby union career
- Position: Loose forward
Provincial / State sides
Years	Team	Apps	(Points)
1899–1900	Wellington		
1901–05	Taranaki		
-	Hawke's Bay		
–	Southland		
International career
Years	Team	Apps	(Points)
1905–08	New Zealand	6	(9)

Francis Turnbull Glasgow (17 August 1880 – 20 February 1939) was a New Zealand rugby union player. A loose forward, Glasgow represented Wellington, Taranaki, Hawke's Bay and Southland at a provincial level, and was a member of the New Zealand national side, the All Blacks, from 1905 to 1908 and played in the famous "Match of the Century" against Wales. He played 35 matches for the All Blacks including six internationals. His work as a Bank Officer included being Manager at Ōhura.

Frank's grandfather was Rev Adam D.Glasgow, from Co Antrim. He served as an Irish Presbyterian missionary to India from 1842 until 1855 (retired through ill health) and then in Dunedin New Zealand from November 1861 to March 1863.
