= John Corbett (rugby union) =

New Zealand rugby union player

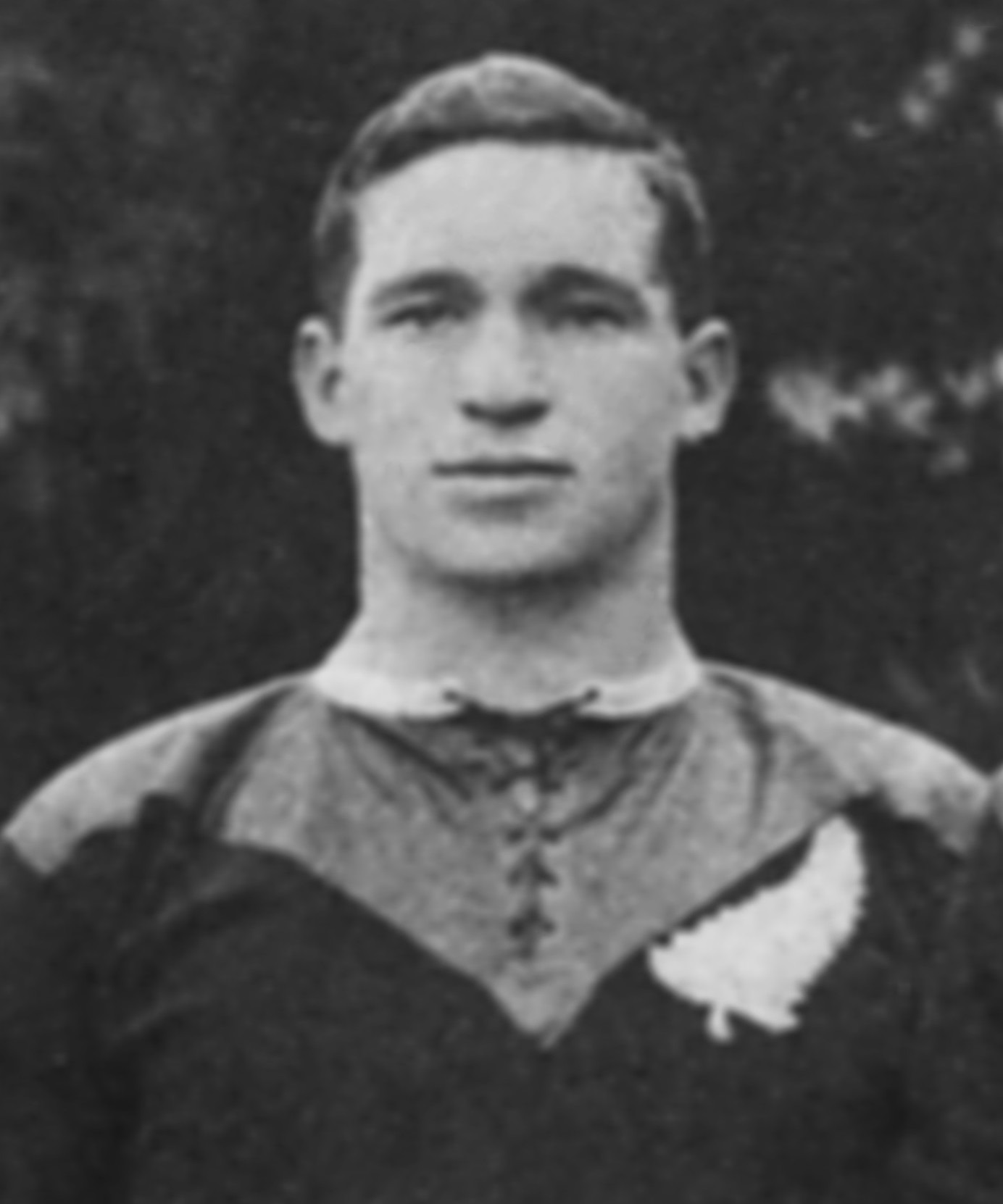
- Corbett in 1905
- Born: 1 January 1880 Reefton, New Zealand
- Died: 11 April 1945 (aged 65) Ratapiko, New Zealand
- Height: 1.80 m (5 ft 11 in)
- Weight: 89 kg (196 lb)
- Occupation(s): Baker; farmer

Rugby union career
- Position: Forward
Provincial / State sides
Years	Team	Apps	(Points)
1906–07	West Coast		
1908–10	Buller		
International career
Years	Team	Apps	(Points)
1905	New Zealand	0	(0)

John Corbett (1 January 1880 – 11 April 1945) was a New Zealand rugby union player. A forward, Corbett represented West Coast and Buller at a provincial level, and was a member of the New Zealand national side the All Blacks in 1905, selected from the West Coast.

He played 16 games for the All Blacks but did not appear in any test matches.
