= Alex McDonald (rugby union) =

NZ international rugby union player

- Born: Alexander McDonald; 23 April 1883 Dunedin, New Zealand
- Died: 4 May 1967 (aged 84) Dunedin, New Zealand
- Height: 1.78 m (5 ft 10 in)
- Weight: 83 kg (183 lb)
- School: George Street School, Dunedin

Rugby union career
- Position: Loose forward
Provincial / State sides
Years	Team	Apps	(Points)
1904–1919	Otago		
International career
Years	Team	Apps	(Points)
1905–13	New Zealand	8	(11)

Alexander McDonald (23 April 1883 – 4 May 1967) was a New Zealand rugby union player. A loose forward, McDonald represented Otago at a provincial level, and was a member of the New Zealand national side, the All Blacks, between 1905 and 1913. He played 41 matches for the All Blacks including 14 as captain. McDonald played in eight internationals, including the famous "Match of the Century" against Wales. He went on to coach both the Otago and Wellington provincial teams, and was a North Island, South Island and national selector. He co-managed the All Blacks on their 1938 tour of Australia, and was assistant manager for the 1949 South African tour.

McDonald died at Dunedin on 4 May 1967, and his ashes were buried in Andersons Bay Cemetery.

Sporting positions
Preceded by	All Blacks coach 1949	Succeeded by Ian Foster
