= Jimmy Hunter =

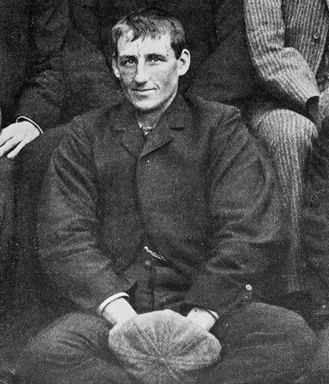
- Born: James Hunter; 6 March 1879 Hāwera, New Zealand
- Died: 14 December 1962 (aged 83) Whanganui, New Zealand
- Height: 1.68 m (5 ft 6 in)
- Weight: 76 kg (168 lb)
- School: Wanganui Collegiate School
- Occupation: Farmer

Rugby union career
- Position: Second five-eighth
Provincial / State sides
Years	Team	Apps	(Points)
1898–1908	Taranaki	43	
1904–1908	North Island	5	
International career
Years	Team	Apps	(Points)
1905–1908	New Zealand	36	(144)

James Hunter (6 March 1879 – 4 December 1962) was a rugby union footballer who played for New Zealand's national team, the All Blacks. He played mainly at second five-eighth, although he could play any position in the backline. He played for Hawera Club before being selected for Taranaki in 1898 and the North Island in 1904 before his first All Blacks selection in 1905. He toured with the 1905 All Blacks that travelled to Great Britain, France and North America. After returning he continued to be selected for the All Blacks until retiring after the 1908 season.

== Playing career ==
Hunter was from a farming family in Taranaki, and attended Wanganui Collegiate. He then joined the Hawera Rugby Club and was selected to play for Taranaki in 1898 at the age of 18. He played in almost every position in the Taranaki backline before settling on second five-eighth. He continued to play for Taranaki and played for them against the touring Great Britain team that toured New Zealand in 1904. He was also selected to play for the All Blacks to play the one Test match against Great Britain, but after an injuring himself the day before the match, he was replaced. He was first selected for the North Island team in the annual inter-island match that year as well. In 1905 he captained the North Island to a 26–0 victory over the South Island; the match was also used as a trial for the All Blacks team to tour the British Isles that year.

He was selected for the New Zealand team that toured the New Zealand and Australia that July. This was a preliminary tour and Hunter was appointed captain. Although there were seven matches, Hunter only played in three. He was selected for the final squad the tour the Northern Hemisphere, but was replaced by Dave Gallaher as captain and Billy Stead as vice-captain. The team became famously known as The Original All Blacks, and played a total of 35 matches.

The first of Hunter's 24 matches on tour was the match against Devon in Exeter. He scored eight tries in his first four games on tour, and after nine games had scored 23. He twice scored five tries in a single match on the tour, the first of which was against Northumberland. The second was when they played Oxford University, and the Morning Leader wrote "Hunter was the most destructive medium on attack and his personal tally was five tries. One half of this little wonder's tricks have not been told yet and the Oxford men were simply paralysed by his tenacity." His next match was against Richmond. Hunter played at half-back for that match, and the Athletic News wrote of his performance "it could only be a player like Hunter who, by the way, was brought to halfback, who could have got through the stonewall arrangements by which Richmond defied the New Zealanders for 30 minutes."

Hunter did play in the All Blacks all five Tests on the tour, including the famous Match of the Century, a 3–0 loss to Wales. His first ever Test was the 12–7 victory over Scotland, and his first ever Test try was scored against France when he scored two in the All Blacks 38–8 victory. Hunter finished the tour with 44 tries which is described by writer Paul Verdon as "a sensational feat that has never been approached in the near-century of New Zealand tours and is most unlikely ever to be."

He continued to play for Taranaki, the North Island and the All Blacks following the tour, and captained the All Blacks in their 1907 tour of Australia. He captained all three Tests against Australia; the first two won 26–6 and then 14–5 and the third drawn 5–5. Hunter then played in all three Tests against the Anglo-Welsh team that toured New Zealand in 1908, and captained the second. Following the 1908 season he retired from active play. After his retirement he farmed at Mangamahu. His homestead was called Oeta and is still in existence.

== Bibliography ==
- McLean, Terry (1987). New Zealand Rugby Legends. Auckland, New Zealand: MOA Publications. ISBN 0-908570-15-5.
- Verdon, Paul (2000). Born to Lead: The Untold Story of the All Black Test Captains. Auckland, New Zealand: Celebrity Books. ISBN 1-877252-05-0.
