= Hector Thomson =

- Born: Hector Douglas Thomson; 20 February 1881 Napier, New Zealand
- Died: 9 August 1939 (aged 58) Wellington, New Zealand
- Height: 1.73 m (5 ft 8 in)
- Weight: 68 kg (150 lb)
- School: Wellington College
- Occupation: Public servant

Rugby union career
- Position: Wing three-quarter
Provincial / State sides
Years	Team	Apps	(Points)
1900, 1906, 1908	Wellington		
1901–02	Auckland	3	
1903	Canterbury	2	
1904	Wanganui		
International career
Years	Team	Apps	(Points)
1905–08	New Zealand	1	(3)

Hector Douglas Thomson (20 February 1881 – 9 August 1939) was a New Zealand rugby union player. A wing three-quarter, Thomson represented Wellington, Auckland, Canterbury, and Wanganui at a provincial level. He was a member of the New Zealand national side, the All Blacks, between 1905 and 1908, appearing in 15 matches including one international. In all, he scored 16 tries and kicked one conversion for the All Blacks. He was the first player to score six tries in a match for New Zealand, against British Columbia in 1906.

Outside of rugby, Thomson was a public servant, rising to become under-secretary for immigration. He died in Wellington on 9 August 1939.
