= 1904 British Lions tour to Australia and New Zealand =

Rugby union team tour

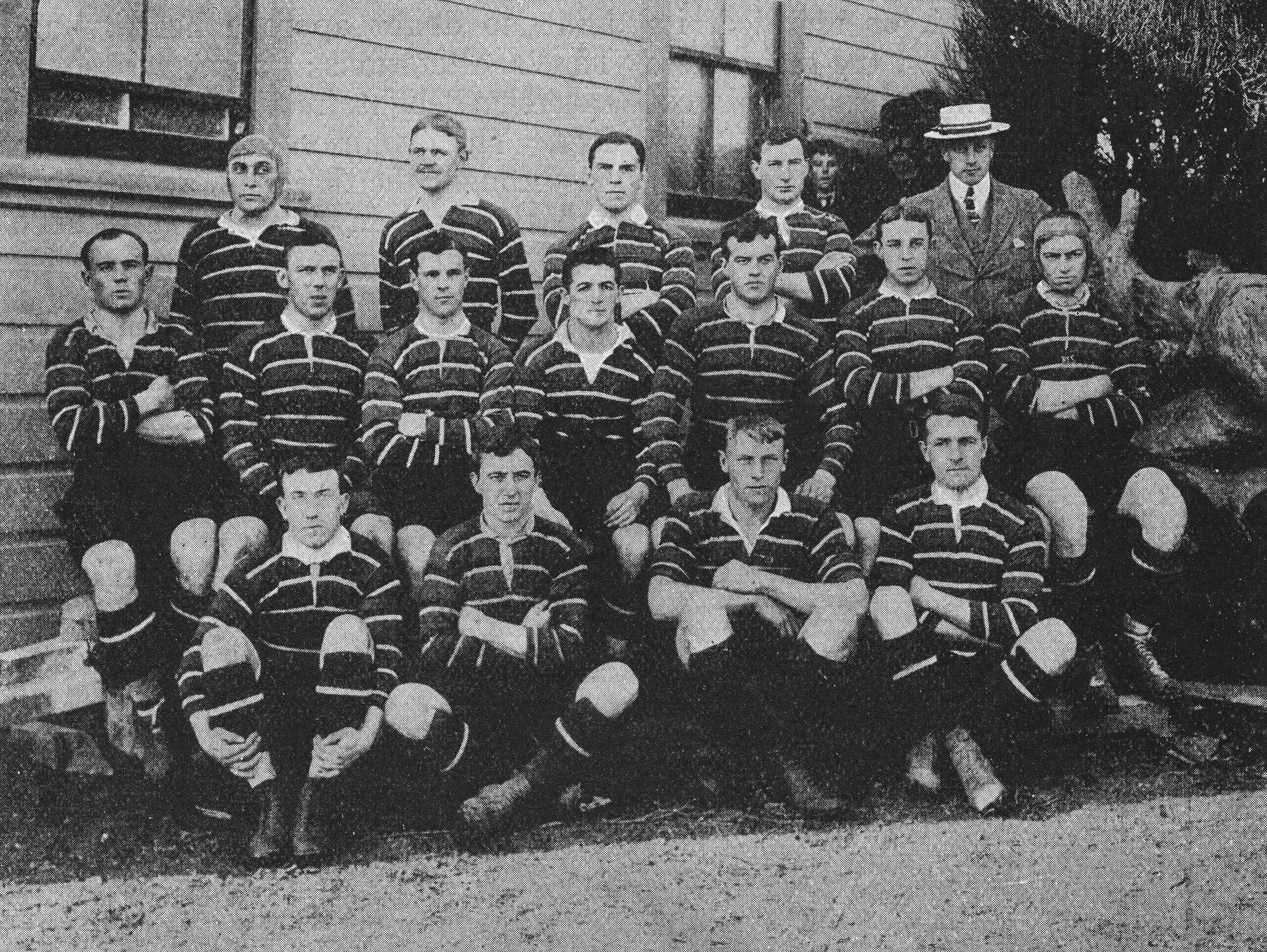
- The British Isles team
- Date: 18 June – 31 August
- Coach: Arthur O'Brien
- Tour captain: (Scotland) David Bedell-Sivright
- Test series winners: (v Australia): British Isles (0–3) (v New Zealand): New Zealand (1–0)
- Top test point scorer: (Wales) Percy Bush (20)

Tour chronology
- ← South Africa 1903 New Zealand & Australia 1908 →

The 1904 British Isles tour to New Zealand and Australia was the sixth tour by a British Isles rugby union team and the third to New Zealand or Australia. It is retrospectively classed as one of the British Lions tours, as the Lions naming convention was not adopted until 1950.

Led by Scotland captain David Bedell-Sivright and managed by Arthur O'Brien the tour included 19 matches, 14 in Australia and 5 in New Zealand. Four of the fixtures were test matches – three against Australia and one against the New Zealand All Blacks. The Lions won all three Australian tests but lost the All Blacks game.

This was the first time that a British team played both Australia and New Zealand in the same tour. It was also the last series until 1989 in which Australian matches were the major component; in between the only Australian fixtures were those appended onto a longer New Zealand tour. The team's captain, Bedell-Sivright, a veteran of the 1903 tour of South Africa, was requested to lead the team by England's Rugby Football Union. Bedell-Sivright broke his leg in the opening match of the New Zealand leg of the tour and Teddy Morgan took over the captaincy.

The uniforms worn by the Lions remained the same as previous tours, blue used in thick hoops and the red and white in thin bands.

== Touring party ==
- Manager: Arthur O'Brien

=== Full-backs ===
- Christopher Stanger-Leathes (Northern)

=== Three-quarters ===
- John Fisher (Hull and East Ridings)
- Rhys Gabe (Cardiff)
- Fred Jowett (Swansea)
- Willie Llewellyn (Newport)
- Teddy Morgan (London Welsh)
- Pat McEvedy (Guy's Hospital)
- Arthur O'Brien (Guy's Hospital)

=== Half-backs ===
- Percy Bush (Cardiff)
- Tommy Vile (Newport)
- Frank Hulme (Birkenhead Park)

=== Forwards ===
- David Bedell-Sivright (Cambridge University and Scotland) (captain)
- Sid Bevan (Swansea)
- Sidney Nelson Crowther (Lennox FC)
- John Sharland (Streatham)
- Denys Dobson (Oxford University)
- Charlie Patterson (Malone RFC)
- Reg Edwards (Malone RFC)
- Arthur Harding (Cardiff)
- Burnett Massey (Hull and East Ridings)
- Ron Rogers (Bath)
- Stuart Saunders (Guy's Hospital)
- D.H. Traill (Guy's Hospital)
- Blair Swannell (Northampton)

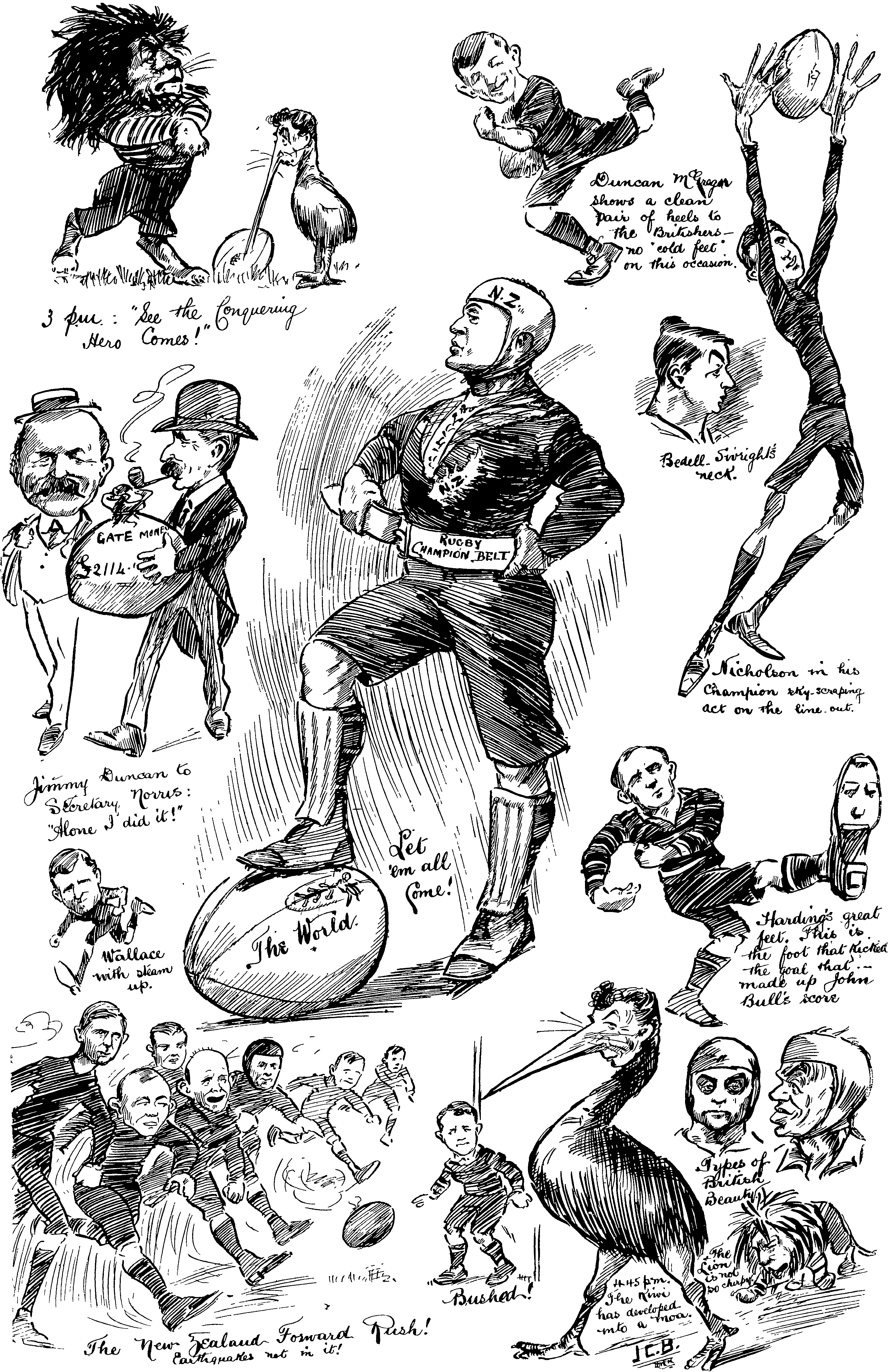
Caricature published in The New Zealand Free Lance following New Zealand's defeat of the British Isles in their Test match in Wellington

== Results ==
Complete list of matches played by the British Lions:

Test matches

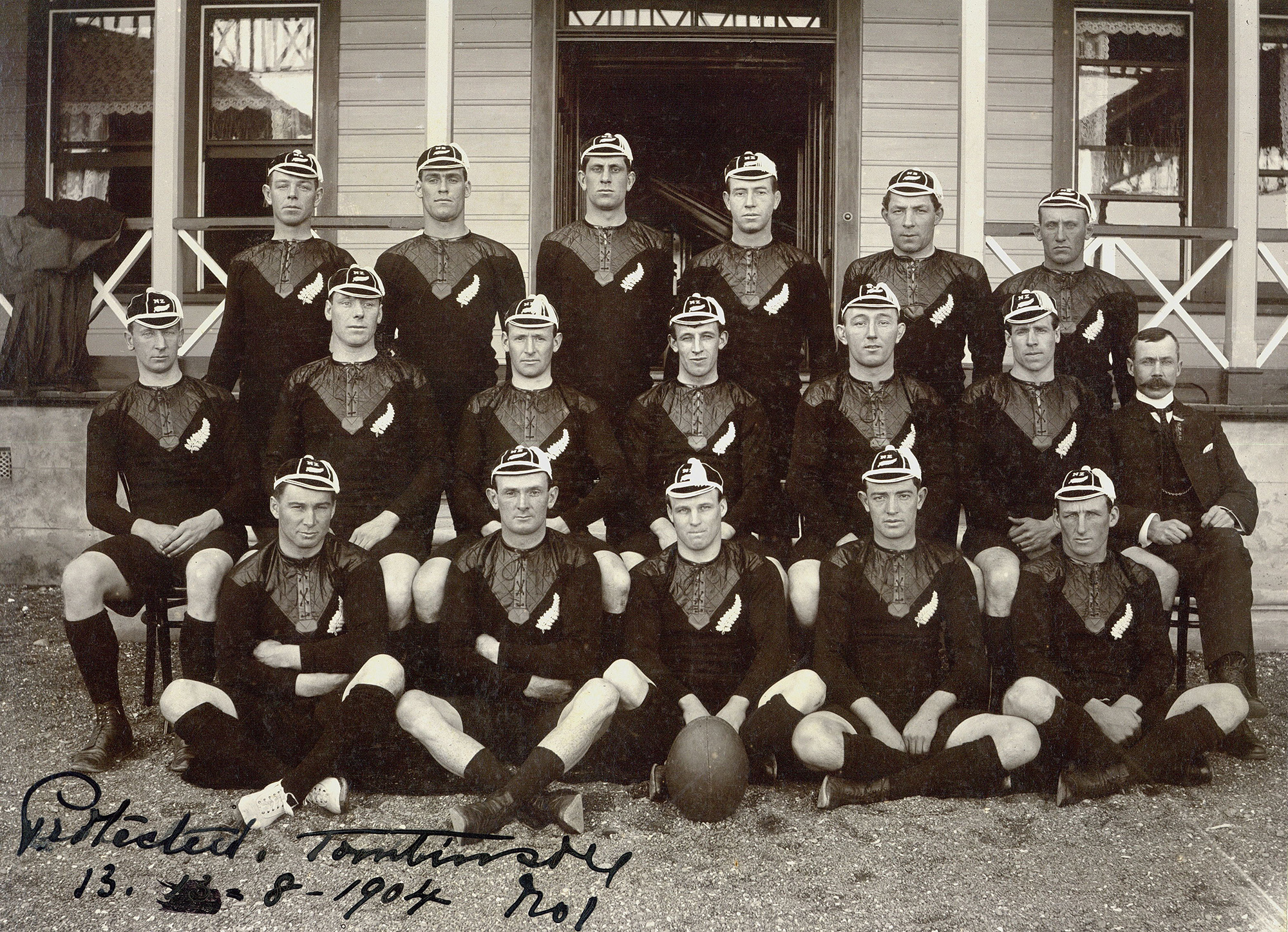
New Zealand national team that played British Isles in Wellington

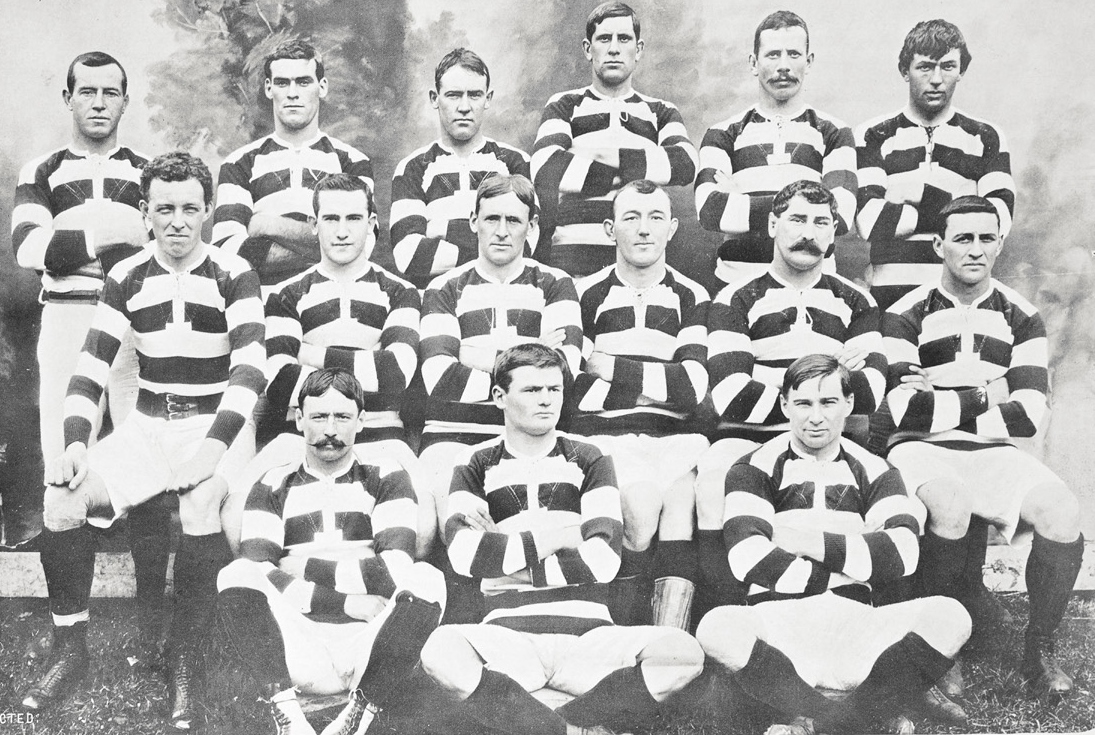
The Auckland side that defeated the Lions team on 20 August

Match	Date	Opponent	Location	Result	Score
Match 1	18 June	NSW Waratahs	Sydney, Australia	Won	27–0
Match 2	22 June	Western District Combined	Bathurst, Australia	Won	21–6
Match 3	25 June	NSW Waratahs	Sydney, Australia	Won	29–6
Match 4	29 June	Metropolitan Union	Sydney, Australia	Won	19–6
Match 5	2 July	Australia	Sydney, Australia	Won	17–0
Match 6	6 July	Northern Districts	Newcastle, Australia	Won	17–3
Match 7	9 July	Queensland Reds	Brisbane, Australia	Won	24–5
Match 8	13 July	Metropolitan Union	Brisbane, Australia	Won	17–3
Match 9	16 July	Queensland Reds	Brisbane, Australia	Won	18–7
Match 10	20 July	Toowoomba	Toowoomba, Australia	Won	12–3
Match 11	23 July	Australia	Brisbane, Australia	Won	17–3
Match 12	27 July	New England	Armidale, Australia	Won	26–9
Match 13	30 July	Australia	Sydney, Australia	Won	16–0
Match 14	6 August	Canterbury / West Coast RU	Christchurch, New Zealand	Won	5–3
Match 15	10 August	Otago / Southland RU	Dunedin, New Zealand	Won	14–8
Match 16	13 August	New Zealand	Wellington, New Zealand	Lost	3–9
Match 17	17 August	Taranaki / Wanganui / Manawatu RU	New Plymouth, New Zealand	Drew	0–0
Match 18	20 August	Auckland RU	Auckland, New Zealand	Lost	0–13
Match 19	31 August	NSW Waratahs	Sydney, Australia	Won	5–0

Summary
Played in	Matches	Won	Lost	Drawn	Points for	Points against
Australia	14	14	0	0	265	51
New Zealand	5	2	2	1	22	33
Total	19	16	2	1	287	84

== Test details ==
=== Australia 1st Test ===
2 July

Australia	0–17	(United Kingdom) British Isles
		Try: Bush; Llewellyn; Con: Harding; O'Brien; Drop: Bush

Sydney Cricket Ground
Attendance: 34,000
Referee: Tom Pauling

Team details

Australia (Note: From 1899, Australia tended to use the colours of the state they were playing in, the Waratah's light blue in Sydney and the Queensland Reds' maroon in Brisbane.)	British Isles

Australia: Jack Verge, Charlie White, Jack Hindmarsh, Stan Wickham, Charlie Redwood, Lew Evans, Snowy Baker, Alec Burdon, Eric Dore, Frank Nicholson (c), Billy Richards, Denis Lutge, Thomas Colton, Harold Judd, Patrick Walsh
British Isles: Christopher Stanger-Leathes, Willie Llewellyn, AB O'Brien, Rhys Gabe, T Morgan, P Bush, Frankie Hulme, Darkie Bedell-Sivright (c), DH Trail, D Dobson, S Bevan, Stuart Saunders, SN Crowther, B Swannell, Boxer Harding

=== Australia 2nd Test ===
23 July

Australia	3–17	(United Kingdom) British Isles
Try: Burdon		Try: Bush; Llewellyn; O'Brien; Goal: Bush

Exhibition Ground, Brisbane
Attendance: 15,000
Referee: W.H Beattie

Team details

Australia	British Isles

Australia: Jack Verge, Stan Wickham (c), Phil Carmichael, Doug McLean, Snr., Charlie Redwood, John Manning, Snowy Baker, Alec Burdon, Allen Oxlade, Voy Oxenham, Alex McKinnon, Denis Lutge, Puddin Colton, Harold Judd, Patrick Walsh
British Isles: AB O'Brien, Willie Llewellyn, Rhys Gabe, Pat McEvedy, T Morgan(c), P Bush, Tommy Vile, Reg Edwards DH Trail, D Dobson, S Bevan, Stuart Saunders, SN Crowther, B Swannell, Boxer Harding

=== Australia 3rd Test ===
30 July

Australia	0–16	(United Kingdom) British Isles
		Try: Gabe, Llewellyn; Morgan, Swannell; Con: Bush, O'Brien

Sydney Cricket Ground
Attendance: 24,000
Referee: Tom Pauling

Team details

Australia: Charlie Redwood, Fred Nicholson, Frank Futter, Stan Wickham (c), Doug McLean, Snr., Lew Evans, Francis Finley, Jack Meibusch, Allen Oxlade, Billy Richards, Blue Dixon, Denis Lutge, Jim White, Harold Judd, Patrick Walsh
British Isles: AB O'Brien, Willie Llewellyn, Rhys Gabe, Pat McEvedy, T Morgan(c), P Bush, Tommy Vile, Reg Edwards DH Trail, D Dobson, S Bevan, Burnett Massey, SN Crowther, Blair Swannell, Boxer Harding

=== New Zealand ===
13 August 1904

New Zealand	9-3	(United Kingdom) British Isles
Try: McGregor (2); Pen: Wallace		Pen: Harding

Athletic Park, Wellington
Attendance: 20,000
Referee: FT Evans (New Zealand)

Full Back	15	Dick McGregor
Right Wing Three-quarter	14	Billy Wallace (Goal Kicker)
Centre Three-quarter	13	Eric Harper
Second Five-eighth	12	Morrie Wood
Left Wing Three-quarter	11	Duncan McGregor
First Five-eighth	10	Billy Stead
Half Back	9	Peter Harvey
Wing Forward	8	Dave Gallaher (Captain)
Back Row	7	Bronco Seeling
Back Row	6	Billy Glenn
Side Row	5	George Nicholson
Lock	4	Bernie Fanning
Side Row	3	Tom Cross
Hooker	2	Paddy McMinn
Hooker	1	George Tyler
Manager:
Jimmy Duncan

Full Back	15	Arthur O'Brien
Right Wing	14	Teddy Morgan (Captain)
Outside Centre	13	Rhys Gabe
Inside Centre	12	Willie Llewellyn
Left Wing	11	Pat McEvedy
Fly Half	10	Percy Bush
Scrum Half	9	Tommy Vile
Number 8	8	Arthur Harding (Goal Kicker)
Openside Flanker	7	Blair Swannell
Blindside Flanker	6	Sid Crowther
Right Lock	5	Reg Edwards
Left Lock	4	Sid Bevan
Tight Head Prop	3	Ron Rogers
Hooker	2	David Trail
Loose Head Prop	1	Denys Dobson
Coach:
Arthur O'Brien

== Team Strip ==
|- |

New Zealand	British Isles
