= Jack Verge =

Australia international rugby union player (1880–1915)

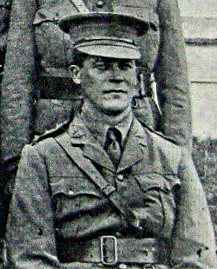
- Born: Arthur Verge; 12 February 1880 Kempsey, New South Wales
- Died: 8 September 1915 (aged 35) Alexandria, Egypt
- Weight: 10 st 7 lb (67 kg)
- School: The King's School, Parramatta, NSW
- University: St Paul's College, University of Sydney
- Notable relative: John Verge (Grandfather)
- Occupation: Dermatologist

Rugby union career
- Position: Fullback
Amateur team(s)
Years	Team	Apps	(Points)
1900–01	Sydney University II		
1902–04, 1906	Sydney University I		
1907–08	Edinburgh University		
Senior career
Years	Team	Apps	(Points)
1902–07	Metropolitan Rugby Union		
Provincial / State sides
Years	Team	Apps	(Points)
1902, 1904	New South Wales	8	
International career
Years	Team	Apps	(Points)
1904	Australia	2	(0)
- Military career
- Burial place: Chatby Military Cemetery (Row Q, Grave No. 523), Egypt; 31.2069°N 29.91812°E
- Allegiance: Australia
- Branch: Australian Army
- Service years: 1914–15
- Rank: Captain (Medical Officer)
- Unit: 6th Light Horse Regiment
- Conflicts: First World War; Gallipoli campaign (DOW)

Arthur "Jack" Verge (Note: McCrery (2014, p. 13) has confused Arthur Verge with his younger brother, C. A. Verge. They were both doctors of medicine and both played for University and New South Wales, at least on one occasion in the same match.) (12 February 1880 – 8 September 1915) (Note: Some contemporary newspaper articles say that he died on 5 September at Ghezireh, Egypt.) was a rugby union player who represented Australia, New South Wales and Sydney University. Playing as a fullback, Verge won both his caps for Australia in 1904 against a touring team from the British Isles. Although he was relatively light for his position, he was repeatedly praised for his tackling and all-round defensive work, and in attack, he was a fast and deceptive runner. His kicking, on the other hand, was inconsistent.

Verge went to The King's School, Parramatta, and from 1900 to 1904, studied medicine at St Paul's College, University of Sydney. After graduating, he practised as a dermatologist. In 1907, he won a fellowship at the Royal College of Surgeons of Edinburgh. In October 1914, soon after the start of the First World War, he was commissioned captain in the Australian Army Medical Corps of the First Australian Imperial Force, and was attached as medical officer to the 6th Light Horse Regiment. He embarked for Alexandria, Egypt in December 1914, and was deployed in May 1915 to Gallipoli, where he contracted dysentery. He was evacuated to Egypt, but died of his illness in September 1915.

== Early life and family ==
Arthur "Jack" Verge was the second son of Austral and Matilda Verge of Hampden Hall, Kempsey, New South Wales. He attended the King's School, Parramatta, which at the time produced many senior rugby players. From 1899 to 1904 he studied medicine at St Paul's College, University of Sydney, and after graduating, practised as a dermatologist.

He had two elder siblings, Mary Elizabeth and John. His younger brother, Cuthbert, also played rugby for Sydney University and New South Wales, and went on to become a doctor.

== Rugby career ==
Jack Verge went to Sydney University in 1900 and for the first two years played fullback for the University second rugby team. In his second year, he began to be noticed by the rugby press, both for his defensive play and kicking skills. In the July 1901 match between University II and Balmain II, Verge scored two tries, and was then selected to play for the New South Wales (NSW) second team.

He also played cricket at University, initially for the second team, and he was considered to be as good a cricketer as he was at rugby. He was a slow-pace bowler, and at one time, he was the most successful bowler at the University. He played in two matches against Melbourne University: in 1903, he took two wickets for 22 runs in the first innings, and six wickets for 20 in the second; in 1904, he took four for 70 and three for 69.

=== Selection for University XV and NSW XV (1902) ===
At the start of the 1902 rugby season in May, Verge was up for selection to the University first XV, either at fullback or threequarter, and also for NSW as fullback. He took the place at fullback on the University XV from A. J. McKenzie. By June 1902, Verge was gaining recognition in the press. The Referee reported: "Verge, as full back, deserves a special word of praise for quickness and all-round ability: he has steadily improved until he now may be compared with any man we have in the position. And he is likely to still further improve." After a lacklustre performance by John Maund at fullback in the first inter-state match between NSW and Queensland, Verge gained his first cap for NSW in the return match on 19 July 1902 at University Oval, Sydney.

Some 16,000 spectators turned out to watch. From the start, both sides had good attacking opportunities. Early on, through the kicking of Verge and Blarney (playing threequarter), NSW got to within 25 yards of the Queensland try line but the visitors managed to get the ball away. Shortly after, Queensland kicked the ball hard towards Verge, who was back at the NSW goal line, and the Queensland threequarter—and captain—Lonnie Spragg, chased fast after it but Verge kicked the ball away safely. NSW scored the first points with a goal from a mark by Stan Wickham and Queensland responded with a penalty goal before half time. The score at the break was 4–3 to NSW. Verge's defensive work in the first half was noted by The Sunday Times of Sydney. Straight after the break, Wickham kicked a drop goal for NSW but Queensland scored a try moments later, which was converted and gave Queensland the lead 7–8. Another penalty and a try for NSW put the home side ahead 13–8 for the victory. The game was considered one of the best between the two states. Verge, according to The Sunday Times, "made a highly creditable debut in representative football, in a match that required the full back to have his wits about him." The Sydney Morning Herald noted that "Verge on several occasions saved splendidly, generally finding the line with useful punts and never losing his head." Playing for University against South Sydney soon after, Verge gave a "brilliant exposition ... sure in catching, very quick and tricky on his feet, and excellent in finding the line, he could not have done better work."

The premiership competition of 1902 was decided in the match between University and Western Suburbs on 27 August 1902. After the match, Verge and other players from both teams departed for Brisbane with the NSW team, where neither he, nor several others of his teammates, had ever played. Western beat University and one commentator thought that Western's fullback, Richard Simpson, had outplayed Verge. The first match against Queensland on 30 August was won by the home side, 16–11. Verge's performance was less well received than in the previous inter-state match, with comments that his tackling was unreliable, although he kicked well. The following week, on 6 September, NSW played Queensland again and won a hard-fought victory 8–13, although a man short for the final 20 minutes. According to The Brisbane Courier, Verge "played a game at full back that could not have been improved on".

Three players were considered for selection to play fullback for NSW in 1903 for the New Zealand tour of Australia: Maund, Verge and Hawthorne. Maund was selected and Verge continued to play for University.

=== 1904 season ===
Early in the 1904 season, according to "Rhabdos" writing in The Town and Country Journal, Verge was "showing fine form ... kicking and tackling splendidly, and [was], in addition, very sure." The selectors for NSW had a difficult choice at fullback between Maund, who had played in 1903, Verge, and two or three others. The Sunday Times praised Verge's handling, kicking and rush-stopping. "Gulliver" writing for The Arrow preferred Verge's quickness and positioning judgment ahead of Maund's weight advantage but thought that both were playing a "first-rate" game at fullback. It was Verge, in the end, who was selected to represent NSW on 11 June against Queensland.

A crowd of 22,000 spectators gathered at the University Oval for the NSW v Queensland match on 11 June. It was not considered a good game, with the home side's 11–6 victory coming through stronger defence. The fast pace of the Queensland backs almost resulted in a try early in the first half but the ball was knocked on over the line after the defenders were beaten. Instead it was NSW who got the first points through a converted try. Repeated attacks from Queensland failed to provide points and NSW scored another try for an 8–0 lead at the end of the first half. A further try came for NSW from "some sparkling work", and Queensland gained two penalty goals, being prevented from scoring any tries by the defensive work of Verge, J. McMahon and Iggy O'Donnell, the NSW skipper. In the final moments, Pat Walsh, the NSW forward, got close to scoring but lost the ball in the tackle. A scrum ensued and Queensland won the ball and kicked it away. Verge caught the ball running at full pace and went for the corner, but was pushed off the field just before he could score. Verge's good game at fullback earned him selection for the return match on 15 June.

The match on 15 June was played at the Agricultural Ground in front of 12,000 spectators. NSW soon put points on the scoreboard when O'Donnell marked and Verge kicked a goal. Queensland responded soon after with an unconverted try, and then, after some fast play, scored a second try, this one converted to put the visitors ahead 4–8. Verge then kicked a penalty goal to bring the difference to one point. The second half was a demonstration of good attacking play and strong defensive work on both sides. The only points scored were from a try for Queensland, giving them a 7–11 win.

==== The British Isles tour of Australia ====
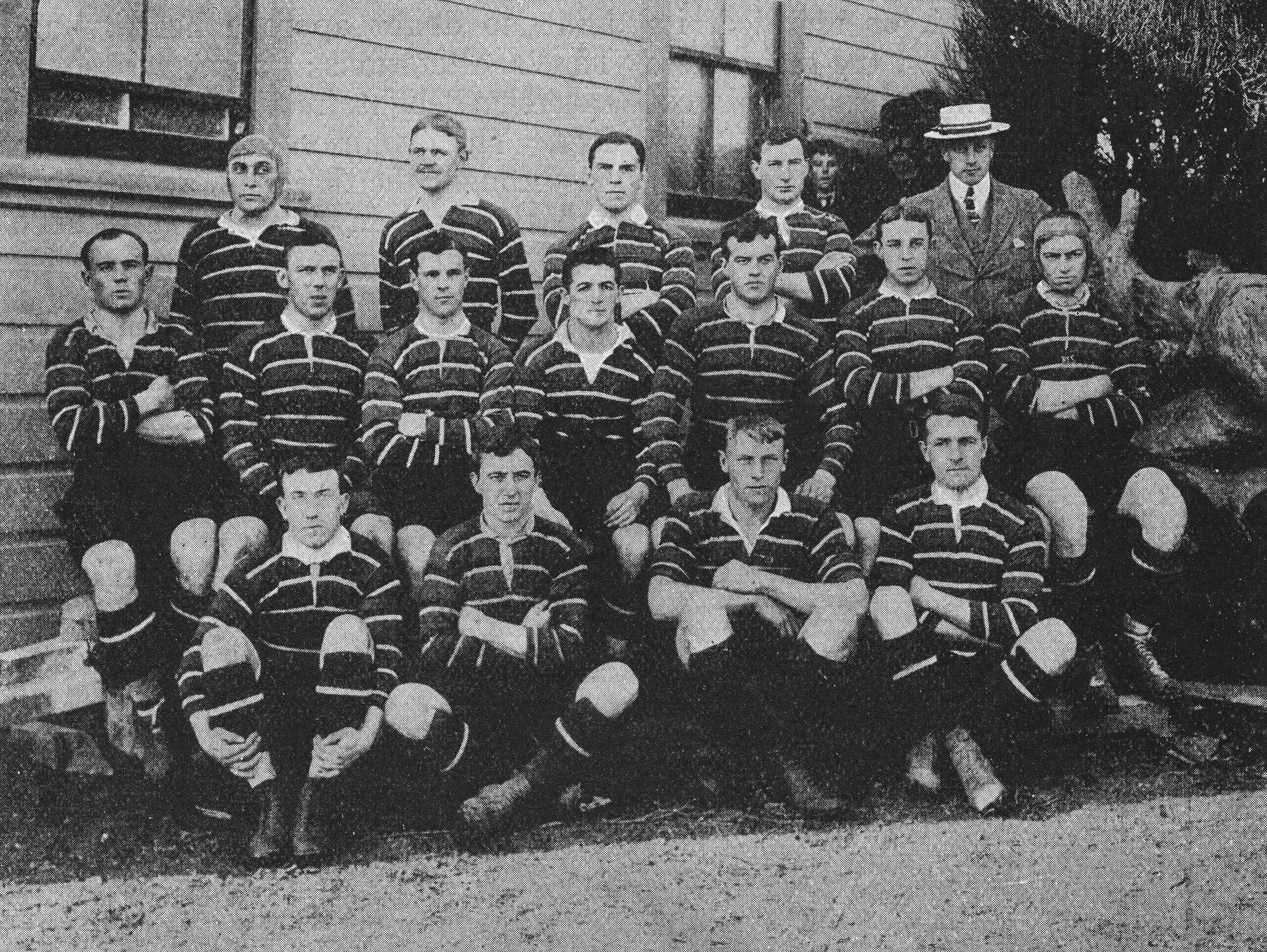
The 1904 British Isles team.

The NSW backs, with the exception of Verge and Wickham, did not play very well in the two inter-state matches, but the forwards, ahead of the match against the British Isles touring team, were seen to be good. The British team, in contrast, led by David Bedell-Sivright, arrived in Australia with a reputation for the excellence of its back line. The tourists' first game was against NSW on 18 June in front of 35,000 spectators at the Sydney Cricket Ground. The game had barely begun when the visitors were already attacking the tryline and NSW was forced to defend. Percy Bush, the British halfback, scored a drop goal within the first ten minutes, and soon after the British scored a try. They were proving to be very quick and aggressive, and the home side had to defend right on its tryline for much of the first half, which ended 0–12. Another try came for the British within three minutes of the second half. NSW's chance to score came when Britain was penalised inside its 25 but Wickham missed what should have been an easy goal. Instead the visitors scored another two converted tries and ended victors, 0–27. It was said by The Sunday Times that it was the best rugby team to have visited Australia, whether from Britain or New Zealand. NSW played well but were "outclassed in every point of play"; Verge, for his part, did "as well as could be expected", although his attempt at a drop goal in the second half failed.

For the return match between NSW and the British Isles on 25 June, each side made four changes. In the opening period, the sides were evenly matched but eventually the British scored a try in the corner, which was converted, and a second try soon after took them eight points clear. The visitors were up 13–0 at half time after another converted try: the home side had made numerous attacking attempts but had failed to cross the line. The second half started as the first had ended, with NSW dominating, but they failed to score; instead, the British managed to counter-attack to score another converted try. NSW then managed to score a try but Verge failed to convert. The tourists then scored another three tries, one of them converted. With Britain leading 3–29 in the closing minutes, NSW scored a second try; this time Wickham missed the conversion. The final score was 6–29.

After the first match between NSW and the tourists, the Metropolitan Union made its selection for the team to play the tourists on 29 June, Verge amongst them; some of the other eligible NSW players were not picked. On the day, however, it was Maund, not Verge, who played at fullback.

Verge was selected to play fullback for Australia against the British team in the first of the three test matches, on 2 July 1904 at the Sydney Cricket Ground. With 35,000 spectators, the first half was dominated by the home team. Britain was forced to defend, and prevented Australia from scoring. Britain gained the upper hand after halftime, scoring 17 points with no response from Australia. The Australians played the second half with a man short after Charlie White, the threequarter, broke a rib towards the end of the first half. The Sunday Times reported that it was a "very fast and excellent contest with Britishers very little superior." Verge was active in preventing the British scoring, making a try-saving tackle early in the first half, and numerous crucial defensive plays throughout the game. Although his tackling was commended, his kicking game received some criticism.

The second test match, on 23 July at the Exhibition Ground in Brisbane, started well for Australia. In the first quarter, a kick from Wickham towards the British corner was picked up by Pat McEvedy, the New Zealand-born winger playing for Britain, and he was tackled into touch by the Australian forward Alec Burdon. The ball then came to Verge, who kicked towards the British halfback Bush, and Burdon took it and ran over the tryline for the opening score, with no conversion. The British levelled the score at the start of the second half with an unconverted try by Bush, and then immediately after, he scored a drop goal to put the visitors 3–7 ahead. The British added a further ten points to their tally, and won the match 3–17. Verge kicked well in this game, according to The Sunday Times. Verge was not selected to play in the third test, and returned to play for the University team.

=== End of rugby career ===
At the end of the 1904 season, after passing his final medical examinations, Verge left Sydney University and stopped playing rugby for the team. A. J. McKenzie, whom he had displaced in 1902, took over at fullback, although he soon gave way to Verge's brother, Cuthbert. The older Verge was granted a blue, and was elected a vice-president of the club. However, he returned to the team for the tour of New Zealand in September 1906. Both Verge and his brother were selected for the tour squad.

The first game was against Otago University on 10 September, which the home side won easily, 21–0. Jack Verge was the only one of the team to play well, preventing the home side scoring through his tackling. For the return match on 15 September, the younger Verge was brought in at five-eighth, which helped strengthen the team. No points were scored in the first half, although the visitors came close to getting a try but were held up on the line. In the second half, Otago scored six points to Sydney's three, and again came away the winners. Verge missed scoring from a penalty kick, which hit the crossbar.

Jack Verge departed for England aboard the RMS Mongolia on 25 May 1907, to spend three years in the UK and Europe undertaking further studies in medicine, while also playing rugby. He was awarded a Fellowship at the Royal College of Surgeons of Edinburgh, and played rugby for Edinburgh University in 1908. Verge's brother, meanwhile, continued to play for University and also played fullback for Metropolitan against the Anglo-Welsh touring team in Sydney on 15 August 1908, which the tourists won 13–16 with a try in the final moments, and against the Ponsonby team on tour from New Zealand in August 1909. On his return from Europe, Verge practised as a doctor in Macquarie Street before joining the army, and did not play competitive rugby again.

=== International appearances ===
Opposition	Score	Result	Date	Venue	Ref(s)
(United Kingdom) British Isles	0–17	Lost	2 July 1904	Sydney	
(United Kingdom) British Isles	3–17	Lost	23 July 1904	Brisbane	

== Military service ==
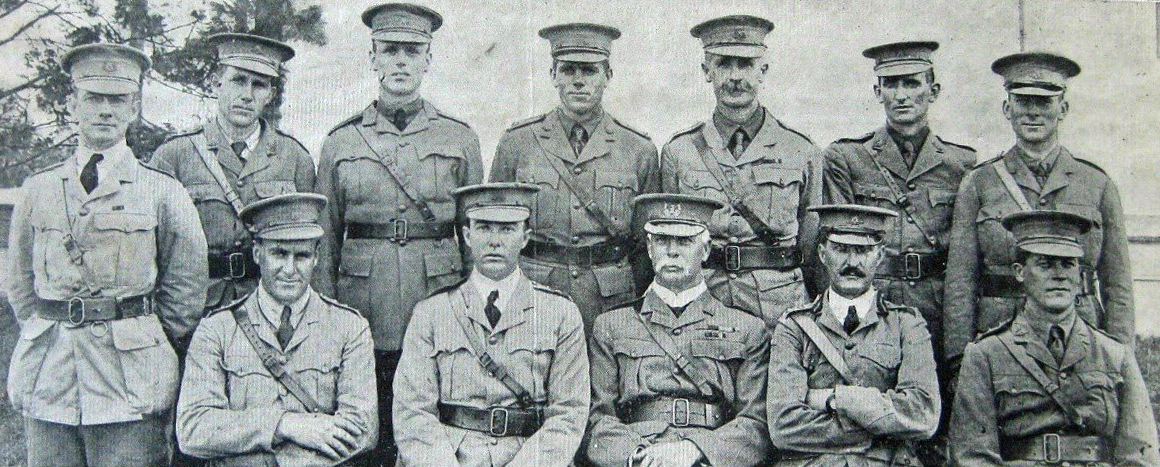
Officers of the 6th Light Horse, 1914. Verge is seated at the far right.

On 2 October 1914, shortly after the outbreak of the First World War, Verge enlisted in the Australian Imperial Force as a captain in the Australian Army Medical Corps. He was subsequently attached to the 6th Light Horse Regiment as its medical officer. After completing rudimentary training in Sydney, his regiment embarked on HMAT A29 Suevic on 21 December, reaching Egypt on 1 February 1915. When the light horse regiments were sent to Gallipoli as reinforcements following the initial landing, Verge was attached to the 1st Australian Division. The reinforcements landed on 20 May, just after the failed Turkish attack on Anzac Cove. The 6th Light Horse Regiment was tasked with securing the right hand flank of the Allied lodgement, and during the months that followed undertook mainly defensive duties around the beachhead. The conditions on the peninsula were very harsh, and sanitation was poor. Several months after landing, Verge contracted dysentery and was evacuated to No. 17 British General Hospital in Alexandria, Egypt. He died on 8 September 1915, and was buried at the Chatby War Memorial Cemetery (Row Q, Grave No. 523) in Alexandria.

== See also ==
- List of international rugby union players killed in World War I

== Bibliography ==
- Grey, Jeffrey (2008). A Military History of Australia (Third ed.). Cambridge University Press. ISBN 978-0-521-69791-0.
- McCrery, Nigel (2014). Into Touch: Rugby Internationals Killed in the Great War. Pen and Sword. ISBN 978-1-4738-3321-0.
