= Denys Dobson =

British Lions & England international rugby union player

- Born: Denys Douglas Dobson; 28 October 1880
- Died: 10 July 1916 (aged 35) Ngama, Nyasaland
- University: Oxford University
- Occupation: Civil servant

Rugby union career
- Position: Forward
Amateur team(s)
Years	Team	Apps	(Points)
–	Oxford University RFC		
Senior career
Years	Team	Apps	(Points)
–	Newton Abbot RFC		
–	Barbarian F.C.		
–	London Welsh RFC		
–	Devon		
1907	Leicester Tigers	1	
International career
Years	Team	Apps	(Points)
1902–1903	England	6	(9)
1904	British Isles	4	(0)

Denys Douglas Dobson (28 October 1880 – 10 July 1916) was an English international rugby union forward who played club rugby for Oxford University and Newton Abbot. Dobson played international rugby for England and the British Isles team on its 1904 tour of Australia. Dobson was the first player from a British touring rugby team to be dismissed from the playing field, when he was sent off in a match against the Northern District in Newcastle, New South Wales.

== Rugby career ==
Dobson first came to note as a rugby player when he was selected to represent Oxford University. He won three sporting Blues, all in rugby union, playing in The Varsity Match from 1899 through to 1901. While still playing for Oxford University, Dobson was selected to represent England at international level. Dobson played in two full Home Nations Championships, 1902 and 1903. His first match was a narrow loss to Wales, a game which saw all 8 English points coming from the forward positions, one try came from Dobson himself, scoring on his debut. Despite winning both games against Scotland and Ireland, England came second in the Championship to a Wales Triple Crown winning team. Before the end of the 1902/03 season, Dobson played for his third notable team when he was selected to play for invitational touring side the Barbarians.

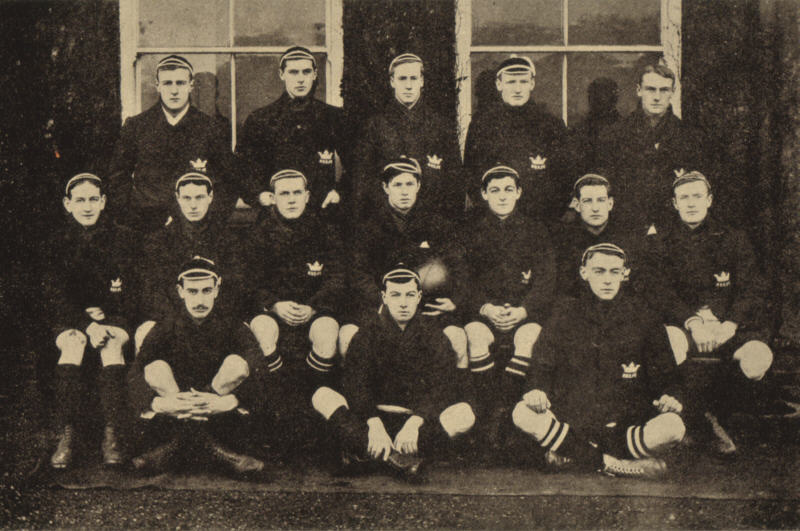
Oxford University XV 1901, Dobson is back row far right

In 1903 Dobson played his second and final Championship campaign when he was selected for all three games of the 1903 tournament. English selection was very fickle during this Championship, with Dobson being only one of five members of the team to play throughout the season. It was a terrible campaign for England, finishing bottom of the table after losing all three matches, made all the worse by the low scoring achieved by the team. Dobson scored two tries in the 1903 Campaign, one against Wales and one against Scotland, his six points were more than the rest of the team could muster between them over the three encounters. Dobson did not play for England again, but his three tries in six games remains a notable tally for a forward player.

In 1904, Dobson was selected for the British Isles team to tour Australia and New Zealand. Led by Scottish international and fellow Barbarian David Bedell-Sivright, Dobson played in all four Test matches, three wins over Australia and a loss to New Zealand. Despite a successful tour, Dobson is notable as being the first representative of a British Isles team to be sent off in an overseas tour. As well as the Test matches, the British Isles team played regional and invitational teams. The sixth invitational encounter was the Northern Districts, played at Newcastle in New South Wales on 6 July, just four days after the first Australia Test. During the second-half of the game, Harry Dolan, the referee, awarded the Northern District team a free-kick at a scrum. Dobson supposedly resented the decision and swore at Dolan. The referee then ordered Dobson from the field. The British captain ordered his entire team off the field. Twenty minutes later Bedell-Sivright and the team emerged from the pavilion and resumed the game, without Dobson.

Bedell-Sivright later described Dobson as "one of the quietest and most gentlemanly of members of the team" The New South Wales Rugby Union had an inquiry into the matter. Five Northern District players supported the referee's statement that the language was used; three British players, Swannell, Bush and Dobson himself, claimed it was not. A controversial ruling one month later exonerated Dobson, ruling that..."the indecent expression reported by the referee was not used by Mr Dobson", downgrading his infringement from using "indecent language" to using "an improper expression". Dobson played a single match for Leicester Tigers, away to Plymouth in 1907.

With his rugby career behind him, Dobson, a civil servant, was posted as a Colonial Officer in Nyasaland. In 1916, while serving in Ngama he was fatally gored by a charging rhinoceros. When news of his death reached England, a former Oxford lecturer remarked that Dobson "...always had a weak hand off."

=== International caps ===
England

- Ireland 1902, 1903
- Scotland 1902, 1903
- Wales 1902, 1903

British Isles

- Australia 1904 (1st Test), 1904 (2nd Test), 1904 (3rd Test)
- New Zealand 1904

== Bibliography ==
- Godwin, Terry (1984). The International Rugby Championship 1883–1983. London: Willows Books. ISBN 0-00-218060-X.
- Griffiths, John (1987). The Phoenix Book of International Rugby Records. London: Phoenix House. ISBN 0-460-07003-7.
- Jenkins, Vivian (1981). Rothmans Rugby Yearbook 1981–82. Aylesbury: Rothmans Publications Ltd. ISBN 0-907574-05-X.
- Starmer-Smith, Nigel (1977). The Barbarians. Macdonald & Jane's Publishers. ISBN 0-86007-552-4.
