= John Hindmarsh (disambiguation) =

John Hindmarsh (1785–1860) was a naval officer and colonial governor.

John Hindmarsh may also refer to:

- Jack Hindmarsh (born c. 1880), rugby union player
- John Hindmarsh (footballer) (1913–1990), footballer
- John Stuart Hindmarsh (1907–1938), racecar driver and aviator

== See also ==
- Hindmarsh
