= Vaux Nicholson =

- Full name: Vaux Morisset Nicholson
- Born: 18 November 1917 Beaudesert, QLD, Australia
- Died: 9 February 1976 (aged 58) near Gatton, QLD, Australia
- Height: 176 cm (5 ft 9 in)
- Weight: 76 kg (168 lb)
- School: The Southport School
- University: University of Queensland
- Notable relative(s): Fred Nicholson (father); Frank Nicholson (uncle)
- Occupation: Barrister / Judge

Rugby union career
- Position: Wing
Provincial / State sides
Years	Team	Apps	(Points)
1938–39	Queensland		
International career
Years	Team	Apps	(Points)
1939–40	Australia		

Vaux Morisset Nicholson (18 November 1917 – 9 February 1976) was an Australian international rugby union player.

== Biography ==
Nicholson was the son of Wallabies winger Fred Nicholson and the nephew of national captain Frank Nicholson. Raised in the Queensland town of Beaudesert, where his father was a solicitor, Nicholson was educated at The Southport School and the University of Queensland. He played rugby for the university while pursuing a degree in law.

A wing three-quarter, Nicholson scored a try on his Queensland debut in 1938, against New South Wales in Sydney. He crossed for three tries against the same opponent a year later to put himself in contention for the ill-fated 1939–40 Wallabies tour and after performing well in the trials was one of four specialist wingers selected. Two days after the team arrived in Southampton, Britain declared war on Nazi Germany and the tour was consequently called off.

Nicholson served in the AIF during the war and reached the rank of lieutenant. He was captured by the Japanese in Malaya and sent to a Borneo prison of war camp near Sandukan, from which he returned in a poor condition.

After a brief return to rugby, Nicholson was forced to give the sport up due to his physical state and concentrated on studies, completing his law degree in 1949. He became a barrister and was later a District Court Judge.

Nicholson died in a car accident in 1976 while travelling on the Warrego Highway outside Gatton.

== See also ==
- List of Australia national rugby union players
