= Tom Pauling =

Tom Pauling may refer to:

- Tom Pauling (barrister) (1946–2023), Australian lawyer and NT government administrator
- Tom Pauling (rugby union, born 1912) (1912–1978), Australian international rugby union player
- Tom Pauling (rugby union, born 1873) (1873–1927), New Zealand international rugby union player
