= Sidney Nelson Crowther =

British Lions international rugby union player

Sidney Crowther
- Born: Sidney Nelson Crowther circa 1875 Bromley, England
- Died: 18 October 1914 (aged 38-39) L'Epinette near Armentières, France
- School: Warwick School

Rugby union career
- Position: Forward
Senior career
Years	Team	Apps	(Points)
- Westminster Hospital FC
–	Lennox FC		
International career
Years	Team	Apps	(Points)
1904	British Isles	4	(0)

Sidney Crowther (1875–1914) was an English rugby union international who represented Great Britain on the 1904 tour to Australia and New Zealand.

== Early life ==
Sidney Crowther was born in the early part of 1875 in Keston, Kent and grew up at Holly Lodge. He was the son of Alfred H. Crowther, a solicitor, of Gray's Inn and Mary Crowther. He had a number of siblings, including Julia (b. c1866); Nelson (b. c 1872); Keston (b. c. 1874); and Bertrand (b. c 1877). Sidney attended Warwick School, and was the first Old Warwickian to gain international honours for Great Britain, when he later went on a tour to Australia and New Zealand. In the same school rugby side as Sidney was Robert Challoner who emigrated to Australia and represented New South Wales and later Australia in the second test against a touring Great Britain side in 1899.

== Rugby union career ==
He went to Westminster Hospital that by the time of his arrival had a distinguished rugby union playing record being one of the teams competing for the United Hospitals Cup. Whilst in London he also played for Lennox FC, then a club that had some measure of prominence having won the inaugural Surrey Cup in 1891.

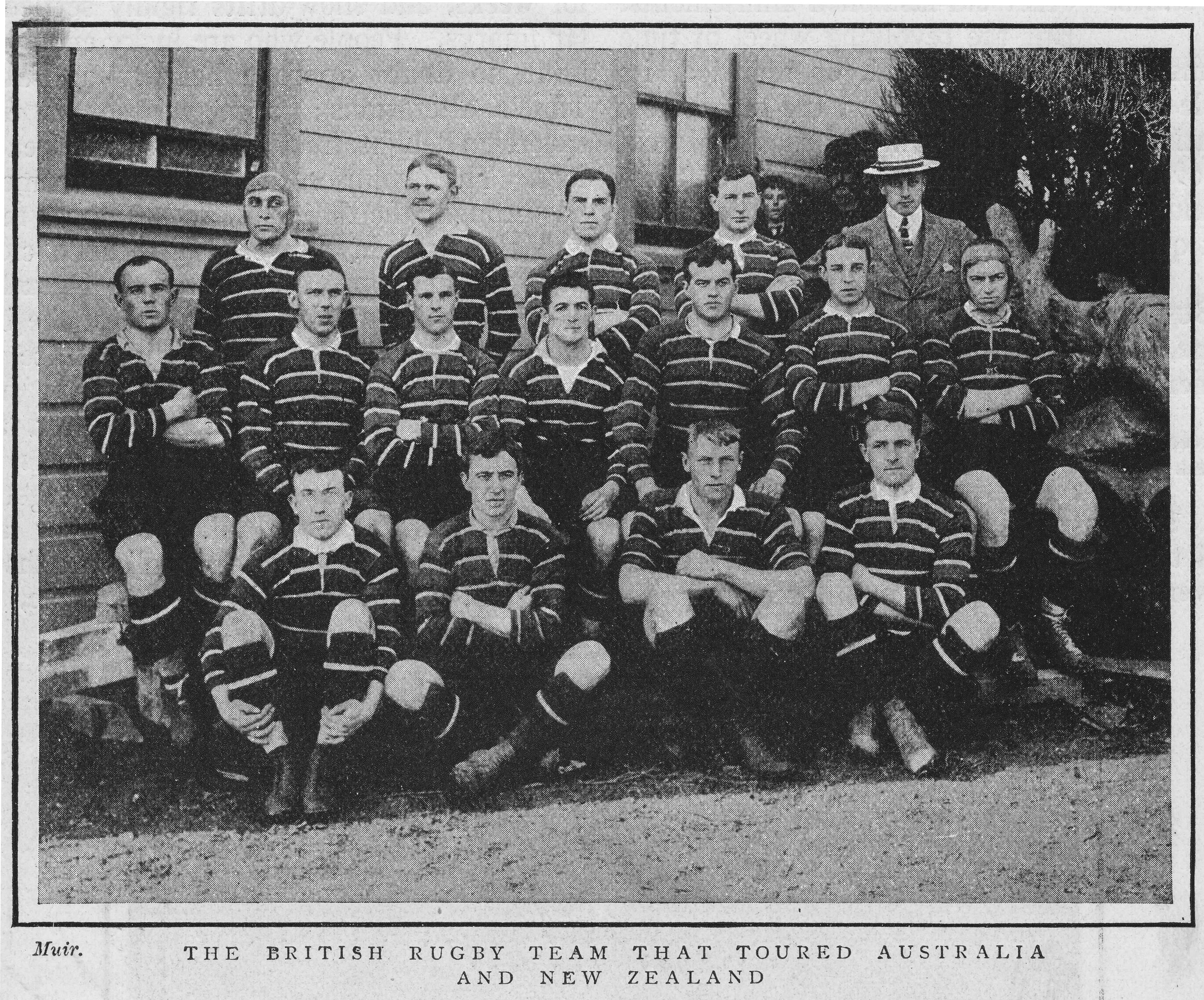
1904 British Isles team

Crowther was selected for the 1904 tour of the British Isles to Australia and New Zealand. He played in all Test Matches, three against Australia and the final Test against New Zealand. The British Isles were victorious over the Australians, but lost the New Zealand match. When the team returned home after the 1904 campaign, Crowther, along with team-mates David Bedell-Sivright, and Blair Swannell decided to remain in Australia, to begin a new life, although Crowther later returned to England. All three of these players lost their lives in the First World War.

== Career ==
Sidney Nelson Crowther practised as a medical doctor. He received his medical education at Westminster Hospital, becoming MRCSEng and LRCPLond in 1903. Following his time at Westminster, he took up asylum work at Brookwood Hospital and on completion of the new Surrey asylum at Netherne transferred there as Senior Assistant and later was the Superintendent elect of the Netherne facility. He did not live long enough to become superintendent because, having enlisted as a motor cyclist dispatch rider, he was killed in action during the First World War near Armentières on 18 October 1914. He had been assigned to the 2nd Signal Troop of the Royal Engineers as a Corporal.

He is commemorated on the Le Touret War Memorial.
