= Sid Bevan =

British Lions & Wales international rugby union footballer

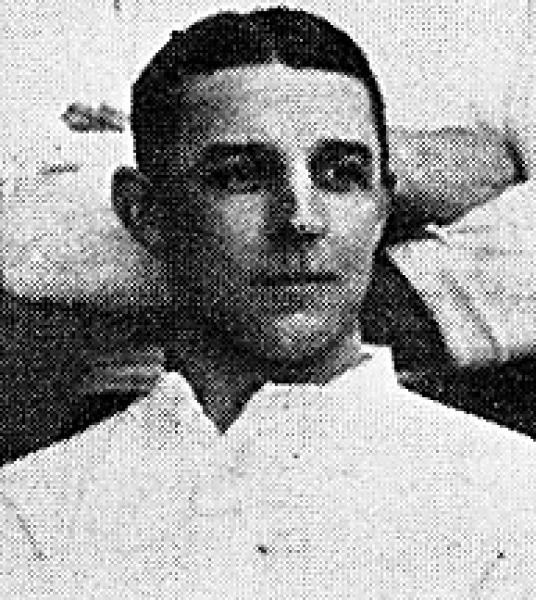
- Bevan in Swansea strip
- Born: Thomas Sidney Bevan; 2 May 1877 Morriston, Wales
- Died: 17 October 1933 (aged 56) Swansea, Wales
- School: Ardwyn Grammar School

Rugby union career
- Position: Forwards
Amateur team(s)
Years	Team	Apps	(Points)
- Morriston RFC
1897–?	Swansea RFC		
–	Glamorgan County RFC		
International career
Years	Team	Apps	(Points)
1904	Wales	1	(0)
1904	British Isles	4	(0)

Thomas Sidney "Sid" Bevan (2 May 1877 – 17 October 1933) was a Welsh rugby union player who represented Wales and the British Lions. Bevan played club rugby for Swansea, joining the club in 1897.

== Rugby career ==
Bevan came to note as a rugby player while representing local team Morriston RFC. In 1897 he switched to first class side, Swansea, and while playing for Swansea he was selected to play for Wales. His first and only cap was on 2 March 1904 at Balmoral Showgrounds in Belfast against Ireland. In the same year Bevan was selected to represent Bedell Sivright's British Lions on their tour of Australia and New Zealand. He played in four of the tests.

During World War I, Bevan was a second lieutenant in the 6th battalion of the Welch Regiment.

=== International matches played ===
Wales

- Ireland 1904

British Lions

- Australia 1904, 1904, 1904
- New Zealand 1904

== Bibliography ==
- Parry-Jones, David (1999). Prince Gwyn, Gwyn Nicholls and the First Golden Era of Welsh Rugby. Bridgend: seren. ISBN 1-85411-262-7.
- Smith, David; Williams, Gareth (1980). Fields of Praise: The Official History of The Welsh Rugby Union. Cardiff: University of Wales Press. ISBN 0-7083-0766-3.
