= List of Adelaide United FC records and statistics =

Adelaide United Football Club is an Australian professional soccer club based in Hindmarsh, Adelaide. The club was formed in 2003, as they became the first and only South Australian member admitted into the A-League Men in 2005.

The list encompasses the honours won by Arsenal at national, regional, county and friendly level, records set by the club, their managers and their players. The player records section itemises the club's leading goalscorers and those who have made most appearances in first-team competitions. It also records notable achievements by Arsenal players on the international stage, and the highest transfer fees paid and received by the club. Attendance records at Hindmarsh, and Adelaide Oval, their occasional home for important matches, are also included.

Adelaide United have won eight top-flight titles, and hold the record for the most Australia Cup wins, with three. The club's record appearance maker is Eugene Galekovic, who made 285 appearances between 2007 and 2017. Craig Goodwin is Adelaide United's record goalscorer, scoring 60 goals.

All figures are correct as of the match played on 25 October 2026.

== Honours and achievements ==
Adelaide United's first ever silverware was won in 2006. The A-League Men Premiership, won by the club was Adelaide United's first trophy. In 2019 they became the most successful club in Australia Cup history with three titles.

Adelaide United's honours and achievements include the following:

=== Domestic ===
- A-League Men Premiership

Winners (2): 2005–06, 2015–16
Runners-up (2): 2006–07, 2008–09

- A-League Men Championship

Winners (1): 2016
Runners-up (2): 2007, 2009

- Australia Cup

Winners (3) – Record: 2014, 2018, 2019
Runners-up (1): 2017

- A-League Pre-Season Challenge Cup

Winners (2): 2006, 2007

=== AFC ===
- AFC Champions League

Runners-up (1): 2008

== Player records ==
=== Appearances ===
- Most league appearances: Eugene Galekovic, 238
- Most national cup appearances: Isaías, 26
- Most AFC Champions League appearances: Eugene Galekovic, 33
- Youngest first-team player: Teeboy Kamara, 15 years, 212 days (against Gold Coast United, A-League, 16 December 2011)
- Oldest first-team player: Romário, 40 years, 320 days (against Newcastle Jets, A-League, 15 December 2006)
- Most consecutive appearances: Eugene Galekovic, 74 (from 15 November 2008 to 26 December 2010)
- Most separate spells with the club: 4
  - Craig Goodwin (2014–16; 2018–19; 2021–23 and 2025-

==== Most appearances ====
Competitive matches only, includes appearances as substitute. Numbers in brackets (if applicable) indicate goals scored.

As of 1 May 2024

#	Name	Years	League^{a}		National Cup^{b}	AFC Champions League Elite	AFC Champions League Two	Other^{c}	Total
#	Name	Years	Regular season	Finals series	National Cup^{b}	AFC Champions League Elite	AFC Champions League Two	Other^{c}	Total
1	(Spain) Isaías	2013–2019; 2021–2025	240 (9)	15 (1)	30	4	—	—	289 (10)
2	(Australia) Eugene Galekovic	2007–2017	226	12	11	33	—	3	285
3	(Australia) Ryan Kitto	2013–2015; 2016–	219 (19)	13 (1)	24 (2)	1	—	—	257 (22)
4	(Australia) Michael Marrone	2008–2010; 2013–2021	154 (2)	6 (1)	19 (1)	13	—	1	193 (4)
5	(Australia) Craig Goodwin	2014–2016; 2018–2019; 2021–2023; 2025–	162 (50)	14 (6)	11 (8)	2	2 (2)	—	191 (66)
6	(Australia) Travis Dodd	2005–2011	124 (27)	13 (3)	17 (2)	25 (8)	—	4 (1)	183 (41)
7	(Australia) Bruce Djite	2006–2008; 2011–2016	125 (33)	8 (2)	13 (6)	19 (3)	—	—	165 (44)
8	(Brazil) Cássio	2007–2014	119 (7)	5	8 (3)	25 (1)	—	1	158 (11)
9	(Australia) Jordan Elsey	2013–2021; 2024–2026	121 (5)	7	16 (2)	1	—	—	145 (7)
10	(Australia) Ben Halloran	2018–2022; 2022–2024	119 (23)	7 (1)	15 (4)	—	—	—	141 (28)

a. Includes the National Soccer League and A-League Men.
b. Includes the A-League Pre-Season Challenge Cup and Australia Cup
c. Includes goals and appearances (including those as a substitute) in the FIFA Club World Cup and 2005 Australian Club World Championship Qualifying Tournament.

=== Goalscorers ===
- Most goals in a season: Sergio van Dijk, 17 goals (in the 2010–11 season)
- Most league goals in season: Sergio van Dijk, 16 goals in the A-League, 2010–11
- Youngest goalscorer: Mohamed Toure, 15 years, 325 days (against Central Coast Mariners, A-League, 14 February 2020)
- Youngest hat-trick scorer: Nestor Irankunda, 18 years and 49 days (against Western United, A-League Men, 29 March 2024)
- Oldest goalscorer: Romário, 40 years, 320 days (against Newcastle Jets, A-League, 15 December 2006)

==== Top goalscorers ====
Craig Goodwin is the all-time top goalscorer for Adelaide United. He passed Bruce Djite's record after scoring against Perth Glory in October 2022.

Competitive matches only. Numbers in brackets indicate appearances made.

As of 1 May 2024

#	Name	Years	League^{a}		National Cup^{b}	AFC Champions League Elite	AFC Champions League Two	Other^{c}	Total
#	Name	Years	Regular season	Finals series	National Cup^{b}	AFC Champions League Elite	AFC Champions League Two	Other^{c}	Total
1	(Australia) Craig Goodwin	2014–2016; 2018–2019; 2021–2023	50 (162)	6 (14)	8 (11)	0 (2)	2 (2)	—	66 (191)
2	(Australia) Bruce Djite	2006–2008; 2011–2016	33 (125)	2 (8)	6 (13)	3 (19)	—	—	44 (165)
3	(Australia) Travis Dodd	2005–2011	27 (124)	3 (13)	2 (17)	8 (25)	—	1 (4)	41 (183)
4	(Spain) Sergio Cirio	2013–2017	20 (94)	0 (5)	7 (8)	3 (7)	—	—	30 (114)
4	(Japan) Hiroshi Ibusuki	2022–2024	28 (66)	0 (5)	2 (3)	—	—	—	30 (74)
6	(Indonesia) Sergio van Dijk	2010–2012; 2016	24 (53)	1 (2)	—	4 (16)	—	—	29 (71)
7	(Australia) Ben Halloran	2018–2022; 2022–2024	23 (119)	1 (7)	4 (15)	—	—	—	28 (141)
8	(Argentina) Marcelo Carrusca	2012–2017	25 (108)	0 (6)	2 (8)	0 (1)	—	27 (123)	
8	(Australia) Carl Veart	2003–2007	21 (63)	3 (11)	3 (9)	0 (3)	0 (2)	27 (88)	
10	(Australia) Stefan Mauk	2016; 2020–2022; 2024–2025	24 (95)	0 (5)	2 (6)	0 (1)	—	—	26 (107)

a. Includes the National Soccer League and A-League Men.
b. Includes the A-League Pre-Season Challenge Cup and Australia Cup
c. Includes goals and appearances (including those as a substitute) in the FIFA Club World Cup and 2005 Australian Club World Championship Qualifying Tournament.

=== International ===
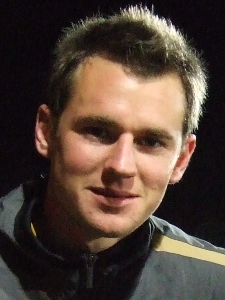
Shane Smeltz was the first Adelaide United player to receive an international cap.

This section refers only to caps won while an Adelaide United player.

- First capped player: Shane Smeltz for New Zealand against United States on 8 June 2003.
- First capped player for Australia: Travis Dodd and Michael Valkanis for Australia against Kuwait on 16 August 2006.
- Most capped player: Craig Goodwin with 12 caps for Australia.

=== Transfers ===
==== Record transfer fees paid ====
#	Fee	Paid to	For	Date	Notes	Ref
1	$250k	(Belgium) Club Brugge	Riley McGree	5 July 2019		

==== Record transfer fees received ====
#	Fee	Received from	For	Date	Notes	Ref
1	$5.3m	(Germany) Bayern Munich	Nestory Irankunda	14 November 2023	Details were officially undisclosed, plus add-ons.	
2	$2.4m	(England) Aston Villa	Joe Gauci	2 February 2024	Details were officially undisclosed, plus add-ons.	
3	$1.3m	(Denmark) Midtjylland	Awer Mabil	20 July 2015		
4	$900k	(United States) Charlotte	Riley McGree	6 October 2020		
5	$700k	(Switzerland) Sion	Dario Vidošić	27 August 2013		
6	$100k	(Belgium) Club Brugge	Riley McGree	4 July 2017	A further $50k in add-ons.	
7	$50k	(Malaysia) Selangor	Taylor Regan	9 January 2019	Fee was paid by player.	

== Managerial records ==
- First full-time manager: John Kosmina managed Adelaide United from 1 July 2003 to 22 February 2007.
- Longest-serving manager: John Kosmina – 4 years, 344 days (15 June 2020 to 25 May 2025)
- Shortest tenure as manager: Michael Valkanis – 5 months, 2 weeks (28 January 2013 to 30 June 2013)
- Highest win percentage: Gertjan Verbeek, 53.85%
- Lowest win percentage: Michael Valkanis, 20.00%

== Club records ==
=== Matches ===
==== Firsts ====
- First match: Adelaide United 1–0 Brisbane Strikers, National Soccer League, 17 October 2003
- First A-League Men match: Newcastle Jets 0–1 Adelaide United, 26 August 2005
- First national cup match: Adelaide United 2–2 Perth Glory, A-League Pre-Season Challenge Cup, 22 July 2005
- First Australia Cup match: Adelaide United 1–0 Wellington Phoenix, 5 August 2014
- First AFC Champions League match: Adelaide United 0–1 Shandong Luneng Taishan, Group stage, 7 March 2007
- First home match at Coopers Stadium: Adelaide United 1–0 Brisbane Strikers, National Soccer League, 17 October 2003
- First home match at Adelaide Oval: Adelaide United 1–3 Sydney FC, A-League 28 December 2007

==== Record wins ====
- Record league win:
  - 8–1 against North Queensland Fury, A-League, 21 January 2011
  - 7–0 against Newcastle Jets, A-League, 24 January 2015
- Record national cup win: 6–1 against Darwin Olympic, FFA Cup Round of 32, 5 August 2015
- Record AFC Champions League Elite win:
  - 3–0 against Gach Dong Tam Long An, Group stage, 23 May 2007
  - 4–1 against Bình Dương, Group stage, 23 April 2008
  - 3–0 against Persipura Jayapura, Qualifying round, 16 February 2012
- Record AFC Champions League Two win:
  - 3–0 against Tai Po, Group stage, 17 September 2026

==== Record defeats ====
- Record league defeat: 1–7 against Brisbane Roar, A-League, 28 October 2011
- Record national cup defeat: 5–1 against Western Sydney Wanderers, Australia Cup Round of 16, 29 August 2023
- Record AFC Champions League defeat: 0–3 against Gamba Osaka, Group stage, 22 February 2017

==== Record consecutive results ====
- Record consecutive wins: 7, from 13 November 2005 to 12 January 2006
- Record consecutive defeats: 4
  - from 14 December 2007 to 13 January 2008
  - from 31 October 2008 to 15 November 2008
  - from 25 October 2015 to 13 November 2015
  - from 14 October 2016 to 6 November 2016
  - from 22 December 2019 to 11 January 2020
  - from 21 February 2020 – 15 March 2020
  - from 17 February 2024 – 9 March 2024
- Record consecutive matches without a defeat: 13, from 20 January 2008 to 30 August 2008
- Record consecutive matches without a win: 9
  - from 22 September 2015 to 28 November 2015
  - from 3 August 2016 to 26 November 2016
- Record consecutive matches without conceding a goal: 4
  - from 6 August 2005 to 9 September 2005
  - from 16 July 2006 to 4 August 2006
  - from 18 April 2012 to 29 May 2012
  - from 1 August 2018 to 5 October 2018
- Record consecutive matches without scoring a goal: 3
  - from 5 November 2008 to 15 November 2008
  - from 30 March 2010 to 27 April 2010
  - from 26 December 2016 to 7 January 2017
  - from 24 February 2019 to 15 March 2019
  - from 20 March 2022 to 2 April 2022

=== Goals ===
- Most league goals scored in a season: 53 in 26 matches, A-League Men, 2022–23 and 2024–25
- Fewest league goals scored in a season: 24 in 27 matches, A-League, 2009–10
- Most league goals conceded in a season: 55 in 26 matches, A-League Men, 2024–25
- Fewest league goals conceded in a season: 19 in 21 matches, A-League, 2008–09

=== Points ===
- Most points in a season: 50 in 30 matches, A-League, 2010–11
- Fewest points in a season: 23 in 27 matches, A-League, 2016–17

=== Attendances ===
- Highest attendance at Hindmarsh: 17,000, against Gamba Osaka, AFC Champions League 12 November 2008
- Lowest attendance at Hindmarsh: 3,156 against Melbourne Victory, FFA Cup, 5 January 2022
- Highest attendance at Adelaide Oval: 50,119 against Western Sydney Wanderers, A-League Finals, 1 May 2016
- Lowest attendance at Adelaide Oval: 16,429 against Sydney FC, A-League, 29 December 2010

== See also ==
- Adelaide United FC
- A-League Men
