= Alex McKinnon =

Alex McKinnon may refer to:

- Alex McKinnon (ice hockey) (1895–1949), Canadian professional ice hockey player
- Alex McKinnon (baseball) (1856–1887), American baseball player
- Alex McKinnon (rugby union) (1878–c. 1944), Australian rugby union player
- Alex McKinnon (rugby league) (born 1992), Australian rugby league footballer
- Alex McKinnon (footballer) (1865–1935), Scottish footballer
- Alexander H. McKinnon (1904–1973), Canadian lawyer, judge and politician
