= Fred Jowett (rugby) =

GB & Wales international rugby union & league footballer

- Born: William Frederick Jowett; 1879 Swansea, Wales
- Died: 5 October 1939 (aged 59–60) Clydach, Wales

Rugby union career
- Position: Wing
Amateur team(s)
Years	Team	Apps	(Points)
–	Morriston RFC		
- Swansea RFC
–	Glamorgan		
International career
Years	Team	Apps	(Points)
1903	Wales	1	(0)
1904	British Isles	1	(0)
- Rugby league career

Playing information
- Position: Wing
Club
Years	Team	Pld	T	G	FG	P
1905-	Hull Kingston Rovers	43				68
Representative
Years	Team	Pld	T	G	FG	P
1906	Other Nationalities	1				0
- Military career
- Allegiance: United Kingdom
- Branch: British Army
- Rank: Corporal
- Conflicts: World War I

Fred Jowett (1879 – 5 October 1939) was a Welsh rugby union player who represented Wales, and the British Lions. Jowett played club rugby for Swansea, and county rugby for Glamorgan. His first and only cap was on 10 January 1903 at St Helens Ground in Swansea against England. He made his début in an experienced team, with only George Travers of Pill Harriers earning his first cap alongside Jowett. The match was a one sided affair, with Wales winning 21–5, thanks to a hat-trick of tries from Jehoida Hodges. Although playing his part in an excellent victory over England, Jowett was never selected again.

The next year Jowett was selected to represent Bedell Sivright's British Lions on their tour of Australia and New Zealand, and was selected for one test.

Jowett was a high scoring wing, and his 1902–03 season tally of 42 tries for Swansea is still a club record to this day. In 1905 the draw of professionalism proved too strong, and Jowett headed north to play for Hull Kingston Rovers, severing his ties with rugby union forever.

During World War I, Jowett was a corporal in the Welsh ammunition column.

International matches played
Wales

- England 1903

British Lions

- Australia 1904

== Bibliography ==
- Parry-Jones, David (1999). Prince Gwyn, Gwyn Nicholls and the First Golden Era of Welsh Rugby. Bridgend: seren. ISBN 1-85411-262-7.
- Smith, David; Williams, Gareth (1980). Fields of Praise: The Official History of The Welsh Rugby Union. Cardiff: University of Wales Press. ISBN 0-7083-0766-3.
