= Arthur O'Brien =

British Isles international rugby union player

- Born: Arthur Boniface O'Brien; 15 May 1878 Westport, New Zealand
- Died: 31 May 1951 (aged 73) Christchurch, New Zealand

Rugby union career
- Position: Fullback
Amateur team(s)
Years	Team	Apps	(Points)
- Guy's Hospital
International career
Years	Team	Apps	(Points)
1904	British Isles	4	(7)

Arthur Boniface O'Brien (15 May 1878 – 31 May 1951) was a New Zealand rugby union fullback who played club rugby for Guy's Hospital. O'Brien is most notable for playing international rugby for the British Isles team on its 1904 tour of Australia, for which he was also elected team manager.

== Rugby career ==
New Zealand born, O'Brien came to England to study medicine. While a student at Guy's Hospital, he joined the hospital rugby team. In 1904, a British Isles team was formed to tour Australia and New Zealand, and Guy's Hospital provided four members of the team. O'Brien and fellow New Zealander Pat McEvedy, were two of the medical staff chosen to represent the Lions against their home country. As well as being chosen to play, O'Brien was also given the task of managing the British team.

Of the 19 matches arranged for the tour, O'Brien played in 16 of them, and selected himself for all four Test games. His first match of the tour, against the New South Wales Waratahs, saw him score four conversions.

== Place of burial ==
Arthur O'Brien is buried in Linwood Cemetery, Christchurch, NZ in Block 40 Plot 4. His last known address is listed as 70 Papanui Road, Christchurch. He was aged 73.
