= Hindmarch =

Hindmarch is a surname. Notable people with the surname include:

- Anya Hindmarch (born 1968), British fashion accessories designer
- Bob Hindmarch (1930–2021), Canadian professor and ice hockey coach
- Dave Hindmarch (born 1958), Canadian former professional ice hockey player
- Paul Hindmarch (born 1988), English cricketer
- Rob Hindmarch (1961–2002), English footballer
- Stephen Hindmarch (born 1989), English footballer
