= Hindmarsh =

Hindmarsh is a surname. Notable people with the surname include:

- Alfred Hindmarsh, MP for Wellington South (New Zealand electorate) and first leader of the New Zealand Labour Party
- Ian Hindmarsh, Australian rugby league player
- Jim Hindmarsh, Australian dual-code rugby player
- Jean Hindmarsh, singer and actress
- John Hindmarsh (disambiguation), articles about people with the name, John Hindmarsh
- Johnny Hindmarsh, 1930s racing-car driver and test pilot
- Mary MacLean Hindmarsh, Australian botanist
- Mike Hindmarsh, Major General in the Australian Defence Force
- Nathan Hindmarsh, Australian rugby league player
- Robert Hindmarsh, first minister and chief organiser of the New Church (Swedenborgian)

== See also ==
- Shire of Hindmarsh, in Australia
- Hindmarch
