= David Trail =

British Lions international rugby union player

- Born: David Herbert Trail; 17 October 1875 Munrorie
- Died: 11 April 1935 (aged 59) Falmouth, Cornwall, England
- School: Dulwich College

Rugby union career
- Position: Forward
Senior career
Years	Team	Apps	(Points)
- Guy's Hospital Football Club
International career
Years	Team	Apps	(Points)
1904–1904	British and Irish Lions	4	(Pts:0; Tries:0; Conv:0; Pens:0; Drop:0)

David Trail (1875-1935) was a rugby union international who represented a forerunner of the British and Irish Lions, known as the Anglo-Welsh on their tour of Australasia in 1904.

== Early life ==
David Trail was born on 17 October 1875 in Munrorie. He attended Dulwich College. He went on to study medicine and became a doctor practising at Guy's Hospital.

== Rugby union career ==
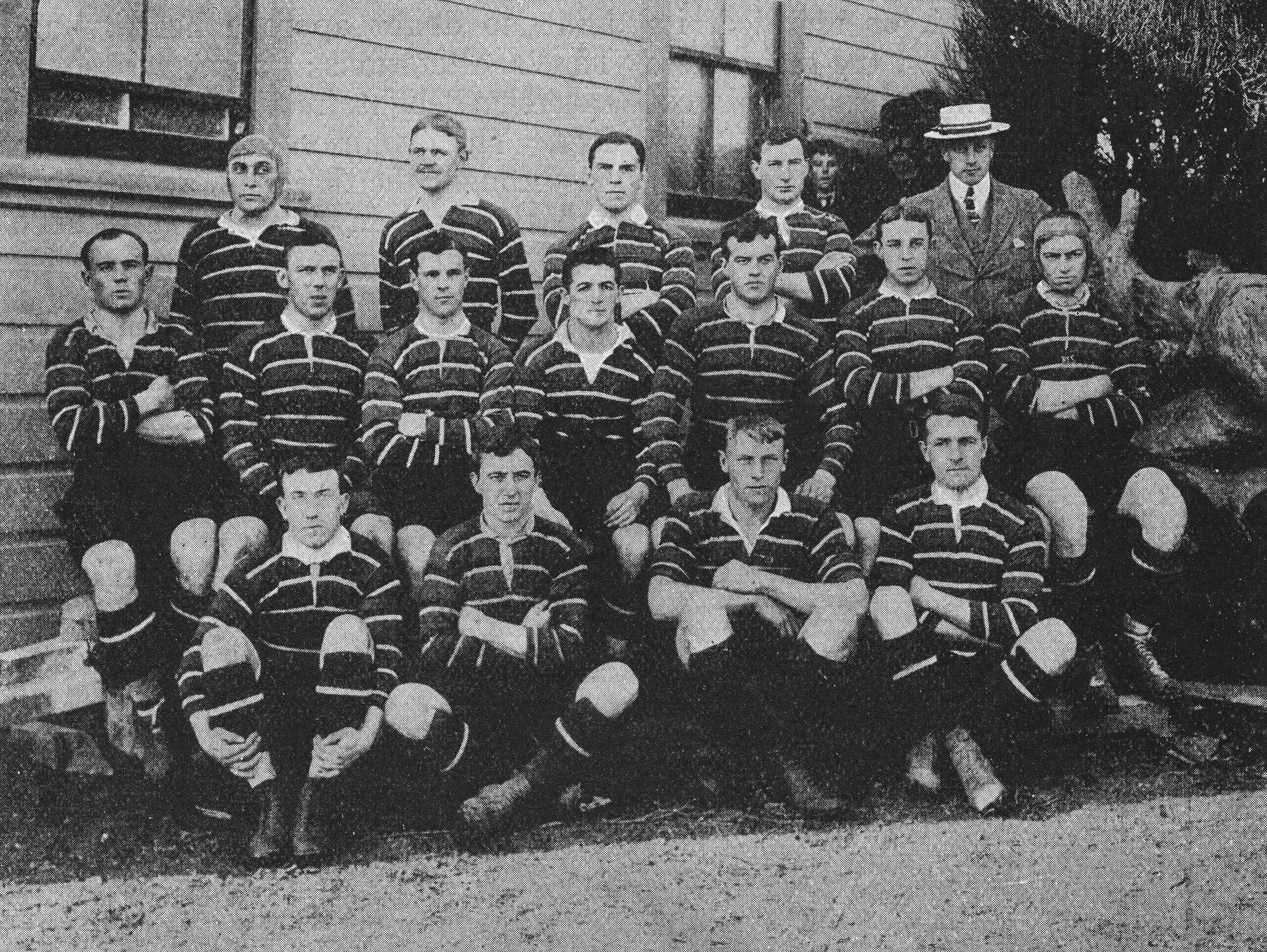
Trail in the 1904 British Isles team

Trail learnt his rugby at Dulwich College, a school that had already produced a number of international players. He went on to play for the powerful Guy's Hospital Football Club. He made his international debut on 2 July 1904 at Sydney in the Australia vs Anglo-Welsh match. Of the 4 matches he played he was on the winning side on 3 occasions. He played his final match for Anglo-Welsh on 13 August 1904 at Wellington in the New Zealand vs Anglo-Welsh match.
