= John Bedell-Sivright =

Scotland international rugby union player

John Bedell-Sivright was a Scottish rugby union player.

== Career ==
He was capped once for Scotland in 1902. He also played for Cambridge University RFC.

== Personal life ==
He was the brother of David Bedell-Sivright who was also capped for Scotland, and who is considered one of the great Scotland players of all time.

=== Additional information about John Bedell-Sivright career below ===
JOHN BEDELL-SIVRIGHT Scotland
Full name John Vandaleur Bedell-Sivright

Born 18 October 1881, Inverkeithing

Died 21 October 1920, Montrose (aged 39 years 3 days)

Major teams Scotland

Position Forward

Test Career
	Span	Mat	Start	Sub	Pts	Tries	Conv	Pens	Drop	GfM	Won	Lost	Draw	%
All Tests	1902-1902	1	1	0	0	0	0	0	0	0	0	1	0	0.00
Five/Six Nations	1902-1902	1	1	0	0	0	0	0	0	0	0	1	0	0.00

Career Statistics
Only Test	Wales v Scotland at Cardiff, Feb 1, 1902 match details
Test Statsguru	Main menu | Career summary | Match list
