= Edmund Dore =

- Born: Edmund Dore; 9 November 1879 Shanangolden, County Limerick, Ireland
- Died: 3 September 1964 (aged 84) Cairns, Queensland, Australia
- Height: 1.746 m (5 ft 9 in)
- Notable relative(s): Michael Joseph Dore, brother
- Occupation(s): cooper, police officer

Rugby union career
- Position: hooker
International career
Years	Team	Apps	(Points)
1904	Australia	1	(0)

Edmund Dore (1879–1964) was a rugby union player who represented Australia.

Dore, a hooker, claimed one international rugby cap for Australia. His debut game was against Great Britain, at Sydney, on 2 July 1904.

His younger brother Michael was also an Australian rugby union representative player and was one of the founding pioneers of the code of rugby league in Queensland in 1908.

== Early life ==
Born to Robert Dore and Sarah Creagan (–1925), he had at least seven younger siblings born in Queensland: Michael (1882–), Patrick William (1885–1041), Robert junior (1887–1954), John (1891–1918), James (1893–1962), Vincent (1895–), and Mary Patricia (1898–1969, m. William Spencer in 1920).

His birth name is Edmund, whilst as a police officer, he was known as Edward. His nicknames included Eric, and Edge.

In 1910, Dore married Annie Guerin (–1981; to parents Michael William Guerin and Ann McNulty), and had at least five children in Queensland: Robert John (1911–1972), (E)dward (V)incent Basil (1914–1981; married Patricia Friel in 1945), James Gustav (1916–1917), Mary Therese (1918–2008; married Lawrence O'Connor in 1943), Michael Joseph 'Joe' (1920–2016) and Patricia Dore (1928 -2017) married Patrick Byrne Simpson in 1955.

== Career ==
Dore joined the Queensland Police Force, became a police officer after training on 2 July 1903, and was promoted to sergeant before medically retiring on 8 August 1935.

After policing, Edward Dore settled in the Tully areas as a sugar cane farmer. He died in 1964 and is buried in the Martyn Street Cemetery, Cairns, Australia.
