= Blair Swannell =

Australian rugby union footballer

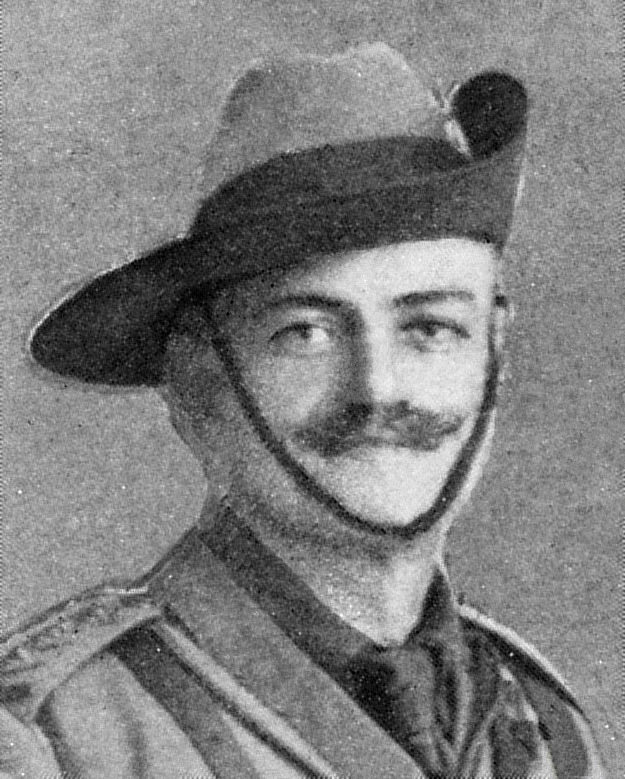
- Major B. I. Swannell
- Born: Blair Inskip Swannell; 20 August 1875 Weston Underwood, Buckinghamshire, England
- Died: 25 April 1915 (aged 39) Anzac Cove, Gallipoli, Adrianople Vilayet, Ottoman Turkey
- Height: 177 cm (5 ft 10 in)
- Weight: 77 kg (12 st 2 lb)
- School: Repton School

Rugby union career
- Position(s): forward, number 8
Amateur team(s)
Years	Team	Apps	(Points)
- Olney RFC
- Western Turks
?–1904	Northampton	116	
1904–?	Northern Suburbs Rugby Club		
Provincial / State sides
Years	Team	Apps	(Points)
- East Midlands
International career
Years	Team	Apps	(Points)
1899,1904	British Isles	7	(3)
1905	Australia	1	(0)
- Military career
- Allegiance: United Kingdom; Australia
- Branch: British Army; Australian Army
- Service years: 1902–03 (UK); 1914-15 (Australia)
- Rank: First Lieutenant (UK); Major (Australia)
- Units: 35th Battalion (Buckinghamshire), Imperial Yeomanry (1902-03); 1st Battalion, Australian Expeditionary Force (1914-15)
- Conflicts: Second Boer War; World War I; Gallipoli campaign; Landing at Anzac Cove †

Blair Inskip Swannell (20 August 1875 – 25 April 1915) was an English-born international rugby union forward who played club rugby for Northampton, and internationally for the British Isles and later Australia. He was invited to tour with the British Isles on their 1899 tour of Australia and then their 1904 tour of Australia and New Zealand. He played a total of seven Test matches on these tours, and scored one Test try – against Australia during the 1904 tour. After settling in Australia, Swannell played a single game for his new home when they faced New Zealand. He was viewed as a violent player, and this made him unpopular with other players. Former Australian captain Herbert Moran said of him that "... his conception of rugby was one of trained violence".

During the Second Boer War, Swannell served in the British Army in South Africa, rising to the rank of lieutenant.

During the First World War he transferred from the Australian Army to the Australian Imperial Force in September 1914; and, retaining his rank of captain, he served with the 1st Battalion. Promoted to major on 1 January 1915, he was killed on 25 April 1915 while taking part in the Landing at Anzac Cove, during the first day of the Gallipoli Campaign.

== Personal history ==
Swannell was born in Weston Underwood, Buckinghamshire on 20 August 1875 to William and Charlotte Swannell, and was the third child of at least five siblings. His father was a farmer, who ran a 423-acre (1.71 km^{2}) farm which employed 17 adults and children. He was home schooled as an infant before beginning his formal education at Repton School. After leaving school he attended the Thames Nautical Training College where he gained qualifications as a second mate. He remained single throughout his life.

In 1897 he made his first visit to Australia, as a mate on a schooner. On his return to Britain, Swannell joined the British Army and served in South Africa during the Second Boer War, where he was commissioned as a lieutenant in the 35th Battalion (Buckinghamshire) Imperial Yeomanry on 20 January 1902. He returned to the UK with his battalion on the SS Orotava in December 1902, and retained the rank of honorary lieutenant when he resigned his commission on 3 February 1903. It was reported that during his time in South Africa, he was personally recommended on the field for a commission by General Lord Methuen.

Swannell was a keen self-promoter, claiming a number of exploits that were so abounding, that his adventures were "too numerous to be recorded". These claims included: fighting among the insurrectionists in Uruguay, to have hunted seal down the South American coast and around Cape Horn as well as Labrador, and to have played rugby in France, Germany, South Africa, India and North and South America. Many of these claims are unsubstantiated. One claim that is problematic, made by the Fielding Star newspaper in 1909, was that he took part in the Cape Frontier war. This cannot be a reference to the Xhosa Wars as the last of that series of wars ended in 1879, when he was merely the age of four. An article from 1925, claimed he represented Wales and Argentina.

After touring Australia with the British Isles team for the second time in 1904, he settled in Sydney. A keen all-round sportsman he coached not only rugby but also hockey, was vice-president of the Sydney Swimming Club, and training senior military cadets for surf life-saving examinations. He also joined the Australian Militia, and by 1914 had reached the rank of captain and had passed the promotion exams for the rank of major.

== Rugby career ==
Swannell played as a forward, and in his last Test specifically at number eight. He was an unconventional and hard rugby player, known for his violent play. He would turn up for training in unwashed kit, and wore the same pair of breeches for every game, again unwashed. His poor personal hygiene and overly violent playing style, made him an unpopular character in the eyes of other players.

Swannell first came to note as a rugby player when he represented English club team Northampton. It was while with Northampton that Swannell was invited to tour with Matthew Mullineux's British Isles team, on their 1899 tour of Australia. Swanell played in 17 matches of the tour including three of the four Tests against the Australian national team, missing only the opening defeat. He also guested for Sydney's Wallaroo FC in one game to improve his match fitness. Swannell scored in only one game on the tour, a try in a win over the New South Wales Waratahs on 29 July 1899.

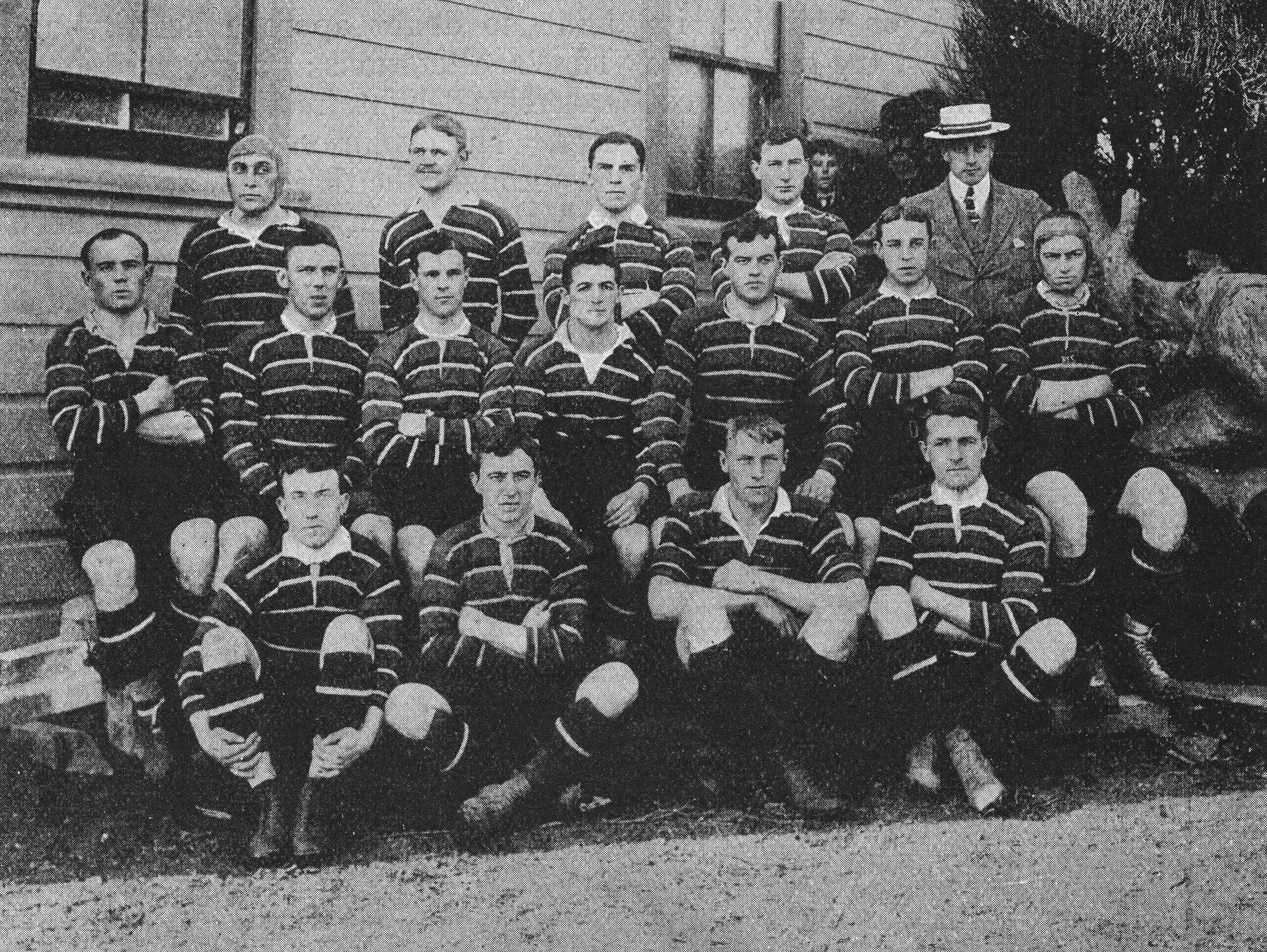
1904 British Isles team, Swannell is back row, second left

Swannell returned to Britain with the touring team, and was reselected for the 1904 tour, this time taking in Australia and New Zealand. Swannell played in 15 games, including all four Test Matches, three against Australia and the final Test against New Zealand. In the third Test, Swannell scored his first and only international points, a try against Australia in Sydney. The British Isles were victorious over the Australians, but lost the New Zealand match, this was the first international game that Swannell had been on the losing side. In the New Zealand clash, Swannell's violent playing style, was targeted by countering with equally rough play. He left the field at the end of the match with two black eyes, and bleeding, but with his spirit undaunted.

When the touring British team returned home after the 1904 campaign, Swannell along with team-mates David Bedell-Sivright, and Dr. Sidney Crowther decided to remain in Australia, to begin new lives, although Crowther later returned to England. Swannell joined club team Northern Suburbs, based in Sydney. In 1905 he was selected to play for the Australian national team, even though he had already faced them as an opponent on six occasions. The match was against New Zealand, and was the first overseas tour the Australians had undertaken; Australia lost 14–3. Wallaby captain Herbert Moran didn't mince words when speaking of Swannell in Viewless Winds saying "Swannell was, for a number of years, a bad influence in Sydney football...his conception of rugby was one of trained violence"

With his playing career behind him, Swannell continued his involvement with the sport by coaching at youth and school level, namely at St Joseph's College where he coached the team to a number of championships. He was an advocate for team training and in particular for forwards to rehearse scrummaging and break-down techniques. He argued that the forwards won or lost the game. In 1909, he became Secretary of the Metropolitan Rugby Union, and in 1910 the club raised his salary from £200 to £250. Financial stress on the club lead him to resign in 1911 to save expense, but he continued in an 'honorary position'. He also served as a referee from 1911 to 1914, earning praise for his ability to control the game.

While in Australia, Swannell was often approached by the sporting press for his opinion on rugby matters. Particularly on clashes between British and Antipodean teams, including the 1905 New Zealand tour. He was vocal in his support for maintaining the amateur nature of rugby, but did not side with Bedell-Sivright in denying that a stipend had been paid during the 1904 tour. In 1908 he was also hired to write a series of articles for the Star on the topic of forward play, and scrummaging.

== Gallipoli and death ==
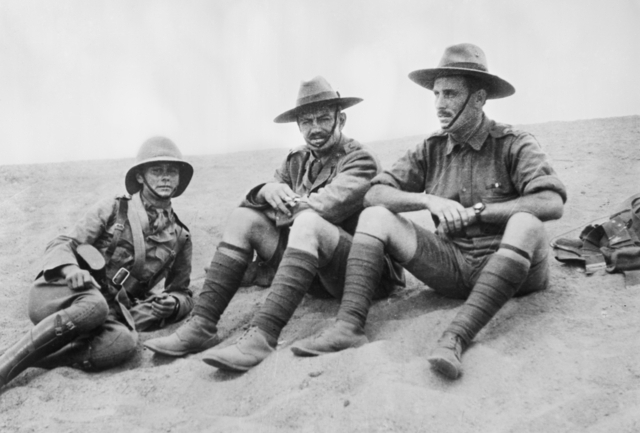
Major B. I. Swannell (center) in Egypt in 1915. On his right is future VC recipient Alfred Shout.

Already in the Australian Army, with the outbreak of the First World War, Swannell transferred to the Australian Imperial Force, telling friends he felt long odds to survive as “I have dodged bullets for three years, but this time I suppose they will get me”.

Swannell retained his rank of captain, and was posted to Egypt, travelling on the SS Afric on 18 October 1914, arriving in Egypt on 3 December 1914.

Although his promotion to the rank of major was effective 1 January 1915, his elevation in rank was not formally gazetted until 24 April 1915.

In April 1915, Swannell was part of the Australian forces that took part in the Gallipoli Campaign — an attempt to capture the Ottoman city of Istanbul.

Swannell and his men from D Company of the 1st Battalion, transported on the troopship SS Minewasska, landed at the peninsula on 25 April, and were immediately involved in heavy fighting after being diverted to reinforce the 12th Battalion. In the buildup to the assault on the hill known as Baby 700, Swannell and his men were pinned down under heavy enemy fire. While attempting to show his men the best method of aiming their rifles, he was shot in the head and killed by a sniper.

He is commemorated at Baby 700 Cemetery in Gallipoli, and also with a plaque on the walls at Weston-Underwood church in Buckinghamshire.

In April 2015 for the centenary of the Gallipoli landings, fellow Northampton Saints and England rugby international Ben Foden, was featured narrating tributes to Swannell on both BBC TV regional news and Radio Northampton. Foden penned and read the following message at the grave of Blair Swannell in Turkey:

From the turf of Franklin's Gardens where you stood,
To the shores of Gallipoli where you fell,
A truer Saintsman I know not,
Forever bleeding green, black and gold.
Rest in peace

== See also ==
- List of Australian military personnel killed at Anzac Cove on 25 April 1915
- List of international rugby union players killed in action during the First World War
