= John Hindmarsh (footballer) =

English footballer

Personal information
- Full name: John Smith Hindmarsh
- Date of birth: 29 January 1913
- Place of birth: Ashington, England
- Date of death: 1990 (aged 76–77)
- Height: 5 ft 8 in (1.73 m)
- Position: Wing half

Senior career*
Years	Team	Apps	(Gls)
1934–1935	Sheffield Wednesday	0	(0)
1935–1937	Burnley	39	(1)
1937–1939	Notts County	57	(0)
- * Club domestic league appearances and goals

John Smith Hindmarsh (29 January 1913 – 1990) was an English professional footballer who played as a wing half.
