= Harold Judd =

Australia international rugby union player (1880–c.1965)

- Born: Harold Augustus Judd; 11 April 1880 Dawes Point, New South Wales, Australia
- Died: c. 1965

Rugby union career
- Position: Flanker
International career
Years	Team	Apps	(Points)
1903–05	Australia	5	(0)

Harold Augustus Judd (11 April 1880 – c. 1965) was a rugby union player who represented Australia.

Judd, a flanker, was born in Dawes Point, New South Wales and claimed a total of 5 international rugby caps for Australia. His debut game was against New Zealand, at Sydney, on 15 August 1903, however it wasn't a clean game for Judd as he was involved in an altercation with opposing player Reuben Cooke, further investigation proved Judd to be the guilty party but it is unknown what his punishment was.
