= Tom Pauling (rugby union, born 1912) =

- Full name: Thomas Percival Pauling
- Born: 26 April 1912 Leichhardt, Sydney, Australia
- Died: 29 September 1978 (aged 66)
- Notable relative: Tom G. Pauling (father)

Rugby union career
- Position: Centre
International career
Years	Team	Apps	(Points)
1936–37	Australia	2	(0)

Thomas Percival Pauling (26 April 1912 — 29 September 1978) was an Australian rugby union international.

The son of All Blacks player also named Tom, Pauling was born in Sydney and educated at Sydney Boys High School. Built powerfully, he won junior state championship titles in the javelin and shot put, while also playing fullback for the Combined All Schools 1st XV. He played first-grade rugby for Sydney club Western Suburbs.

Pauling, having recently moved into the back row, earned his first Wallabies call up in 1936 for the tour of New Zealand. It was as an inside centre that he was picked to make his Test debut against the All Blacks in Wellington. He suffered concussion in a collision during the match and injured an optic nerve, missing the final two Tests as a result. The following year, Pauling was capped a second time, as a centre against the Springboks at the Sydney Cricket Ground.

His son, also Tom, was a lawyer who served as the Administrator of the Northern Territory from 2007 to 2011.

== See also ==
- List of Australia national rugby union players
