= Billy Richards (rugby union) =

Australia international rugby union player (1880–1928)

- Born: Edward William Richards; 5 November 1880 Vegetable Creek, New South Wales
- Died: 14 June 1928

Rugby union career
- Position: lock
International career
Years	Team	Apps	(Points)
1904–07	Australia	5	(0)

Edward William Richards (5 November 1880 – 14 June 1928) was a rugby union player who represented Australia.

Richards, a lock, was born in Vegetable Creek, New South Wales and claimed a total of 5 international rugby caps for Australia. His debut game was against Great Britain, at Sydney, on 2 July 1904.
