= Voy Oxenham =

Australian rugby player (1882–1919)

- Born: Anselm McEvoy Oxenham; 20 July 1882 Brisbane, Queensland, Australia
- Died: 20 December 1919 (aged 37) Brisbane, Queensland, Australia
- School: St Joseph's, Nudgee

Rugby union career
- Position: prop
International career
Years	Team	Apps	(Points)
1904-07	Australia	2	(0)

Anselm McEvoy "Voy" Oxenham (20 July 1882 – 20 December 1919) was a rugby union player who represented Australia.

Oxenham, a prop, was born in Brisbane, Queensland and claimed a total of 2 international rugby caps for Australia. His debut game was against Great Britain, at Brisbane, on 23 July 1904.

Oxenham died on 20 December 1919 at the age of 37.
