= Francis Finley =

Australian rugby union player

- Born: Francis George Finley; 27 February 1882 Armidale, New South Wales
- Died: c. 1943

Rugby union career
- Position: scrum-half
International career
Years	Team	Apps	(Points)
1904	Australia	1	(0)

Francis George Finley (27 February 1882 – c. 1943) was a rugby union player who represented Australia.

Finley, a scrum-half, was born in Armidale, New South Wales and claimed one international rugby caps for Australia, playing against Great Britain, at Sydney, on 30 July 1904.
