= Charlie Redwood =

- Born: Charles Edward Joseph Redwood; 19 May 1878 Blenheim
- Died: 16 February 1954 (aged 75) London

Rugby union career
- Position: wing
International career
Years	Team	Apps	(Points)
1903–04	Australia	4	(0)

Charles Edward Joseph Redwood (19 May 1878 – 16 February 1954) was a rugby union player who represented Australia.

Redwood, a wing, was born in Blenheim and claimed a total of 4 international rugby caps for Australia. His debut game was against New Zealand, at Sydney, on 15 August 1903.
