= Ngama =

- Location in Chad
- Coordinates: 11°47′26″N 17°09′44″E
- Country: Chad
- Region: Hadjer-Lamis Region
- Department: Dababa

Population (2012)
  - Total: 12,438
- Time zone: +1

Ngama is a city in Chad, located in the region of Hadjer-Lamis.
