= Richard Simpson (rugby union) =

- Born: Richard John Simpson c. 1885 Sydney
- Died: Unknown

Rugby union career
- Position: fullback
International career
| Years | Team | Apps | (Points) |
| 1913 | Wallabies | 1 | (4) |

Richard John Simpson (c. 1885 – ?) was a rugby union player who represented Australia.

Simpson, a fullback, was born in Sydney and claimed 1 international rugby cap for Australia.
