= Jim White (rugby union) =

Australia international rugby union player

- Born: James Matthew White circa 1883 Orange, New South Wales
- Died: circa 1935

Rugby union career
- Position: flanker
International career
Years	Team	Apps	(Points)
1904	Australia	1	(0)

James Matthew White (c. 1883 - c. 1935) was a rugby union player who represented Australia.

White, a flanker, was born in Orange, New South Wales and claimed one international rugby caps for Australia, playing against Great Britain, at Sydney, on 30 July 1904.
