= Pat McEvedy =

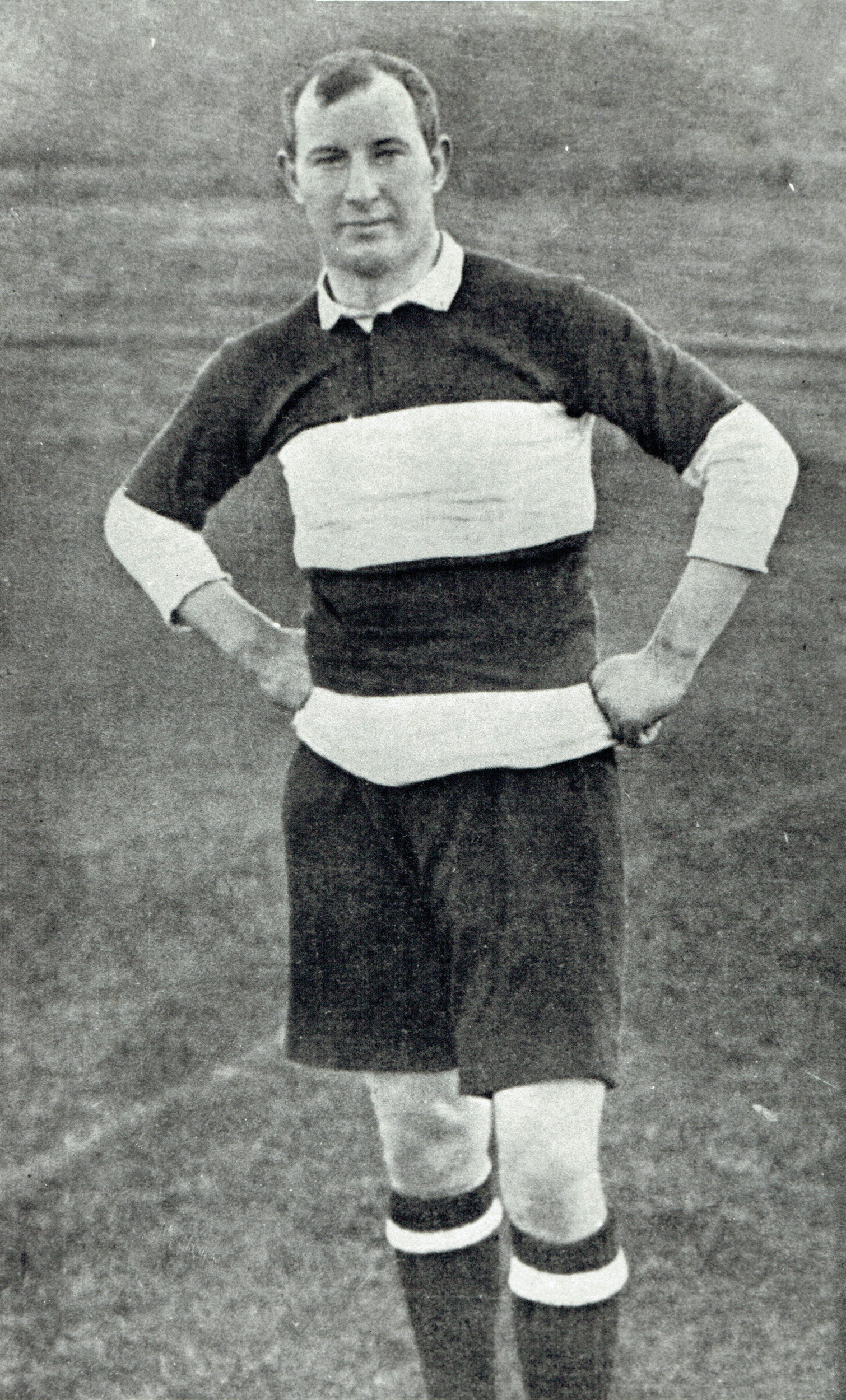
- McEvedy in 1908
- Born: 17 March 1880; Southbridge, New Zealand
- Died: 2 March 1935 (aged 54); Wellington, New Zealand

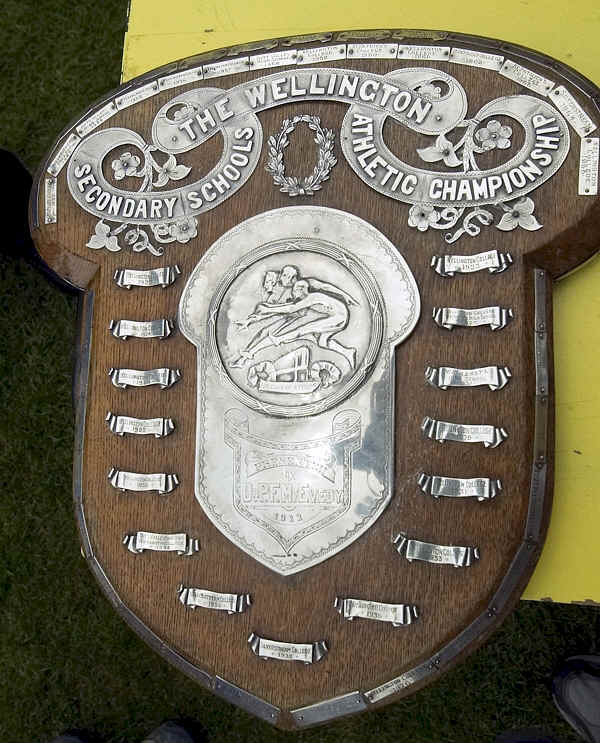
The McEvedy Shield.

Patrick Francis McEvedy (17 March 1880 – 2 March 1935) was a rugby union player from New Zealand. He has the unique distinction of being on two British Lions tours, but never actually being capped for any nation. McEvedy was born in Southbridge. He attended St Patrick's College, Wellington from 1895 to 1898, before going to Guy's Hospital in London to train as a doctor.

McEvedy toured New Zealand in 1904 with David Bedell-Sivright's British team and again in 1908 with the Anglo-Welsh team. During the 1908 tour he broke his arm and decided to retire from active playing, but he became involved in rugby administration. He returned to Wellington and set up his medical practice in 1909, then joined the New Zealand Rugby Union in 1910. McEvedy was Wellington Rugby Football Union President 1931–33, and NZRFU President 1934–35.

== McEvedy Shield ==
The McEvedy Shield was donated by McEvedy in 1922. It is an annual athletics competition held in Wellington, New Zealand, for four of the region's boys' secondary schools. The competition was cancelled in 1948 due to a polio epidemic, and in 2021 because of the coronavirus pandemic.
