= Blue Dixon =

- Born: Ernest Joseph Dixon c. 1885 Brisbane, Queensland
- Died: c. 1941

Rugby union career
- Position: lock
International career
Years	Team	Apps	(Points)
1904	Australia	1	(0)

Ernest Joseph "Blue" Dixon (c. 1885 – c. 1941) was a rugby union player who represented Australia.

Dixon, a lock, was born in Brisbane, Queensland and claimed one international rugby caps for Australia, playing against Great Britain, at Sydney, on 30 July 1904.
