= Tom Pauling (rugby union, born 1873) =

New Zealand rugby union player (1873–1927)

- Full name: Thomas Gibson Pauling
- Born: 17 June 1873 Doyleston, Canterbury, New Zealand
- Died: 30 September 1927 (aged 54) Clovelly, Sydney, NSW, Australia
- Weight: 89 kg (196 lb)
- Notable relative: Tom P. Pauling (son)

Rugby union career
- Position: Forward
Provincial / State sides
| Years | Team | Apps | (Points) |
- Wellington
| - | New South Wales | | |
International career
| Years | Team | Apps | (Points) |
| 1896–97 | New Zealand | | |

Thomas Gibson Pauling (17 June 1873 — 30 September 1927) was a New Zealand international rugby union player.

== Biography ==
A forward from Wellington club Athletic, Pauling made his national team debut in 1896 when Queensland visited the New Zealand capital. He subsequently gained a place on New Zealand's 1897 tour of Australia and scored four tries in eight uncapped appearances over the course of the trip. As he had to leave his job as a saddler in order to make the tour, Pauling afterwards opted to settle in Sydney, where he found work as a police officer. He continued his rugby with Randwick and earned New South Wales representative honours.

Pauling became a referee after suffering a knee injury and had charge of the two Test matches the 1904 British Lions played in Sydney. He also refereed an international during New Zealand's tour of Australia in 1914.

Active in local politics, Pauling served as an Alderman for Randwick municipality in his later years.

Pauling was the father of 1930s Wallabies centre Tom Pauling.

== See also ==
- List of New Zealand national rugby union players
