= Frank Nicholson (rugby union) =

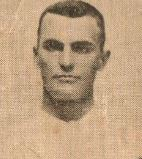
- Born: Frank Villenueve Nicholson; 15 October 1878 Villeneuve, Queensland
- Died: circa 1970
- School: Brisbane Grammar School and University of Pennsylvania School of Dental Medicine

Rugby union career
Amateur team(s)
Years	Team	Apps	(Points)
- Toombul, Qld.
Provincial / State sides
Years	Team	Apps	(Points)
1900-04	Queensland	13	
International career
Years	Team	Apps	(Points)
1903–04	Australia	2	(0)

Frank Villenueve Nicholson (15 October 1878 – c. 1970) was an Australian Boer War veteran and rugby union player, a state and national representative who made two test appearances in 1903–1904, captaining the side on one occasion.

== Early life ==
Nicholson was born in Villeneuve, Queensland, a place renamed from Humberstone by his father (also named Frank) who started the first sawmill in the area in 1877, founding the small town.

== Career ==
Nicholson, a prop, played thirteen times for Queensland between 1900 and 1904 with twelve of these matches played against New South Wales. The Howell reference claims that Nicholson's rugby career was interrupted by enlistment in the Boer War. He claimed two international rugby caps for Australia. He appeared for Queensland against the touring New Zealanders in Brisbane in August 1903 and two weeks later made his international debut against the same tourists in Sydney, on 15 August 1903.

In 1904, he captained Queensland in the inter-state series and played alongside his brother Fred who scored a try in that match. Later that season he had the honour of captaining Australia in a Test match against a touring British Lions side. Australia lost the match 17–0. Nicholson was selected in a 1905 squad that toured New Zealand but he did not play in any matches of the tour.

He left Australia in 1905 going to Philadelphia to study dentistry. In 1906, he reintroduced Rugby per Rugby Union code to University of Pennsylvania while attending University of Pennsylvania School of Dental Medicine (Class of 1910).

Upon his return in 1911 he became a selector and coach of the Queensland state side.

Preceded by Stan Wickham	Australian national rugby union captain 1904	Succeeded by Peter Burge

== Bibliography ==
- Howell, Max (2005) Born to Lead - Wallaby Test Captains, Celebrity Books, Auckland NZ
