= Fred Nicholson (rugby union) =

- Born: Frederick Charles Nicholson; 19 April 1885 Brisbane, Queensland
- Died: circa 1975

Rugby union career
- Position: wing
International career
Years	Team	Apps	(Points)
1904	Australia	1	(0)

Frederick Charles Nicholson (19 April 1885 – c. 1975) was a rugby union player who represented Australia.

Nicholson, a wing, was born in Brisbane, Queensland and claimed one international rugby cap for Australia, playing against Great Britain, at Sydney, on 30 July 1904. His brother Frank was also an Australian rugby union representative player.
