= Alex McKinnon (rugby union) =

- Born: Alexander McKinnon; 3 March 1878 Smeaton, Victoria
- Died: circa 1944

Rugby union career
- Position: lock
International career
Years	Team	Apps	(Points)
1904	Australia	1	(0)

Alexander McKinnon (3 March 1878 – c. 1944) was a rugby union player who represented Australia.

McKinnon, a lock, was born in Smeaton, Victoria and claimed one international rugby cap for Australia, playing against Great Britain, at Brisbane, on 23 July 1904.
