= Jack Hindmarsh =

Australian rugby union player

- Born: John A. Hindmarsh c. 1880 Brisbane, Queensland

Rugby union career
- Position: centre
International career
Years	Team	Apps	(Points)
1904	Australia	1	(0)

John A. "Jack" Hindmarsh (born c. 1880) was a rugby union player who represented Australia.

Hindmarsh, a centre, was born in Brisbane, Queensland and claimed international rugby cap for Australia. His debut game was against Great Britain, at Sydney, on 2 July 1904.
