= Percy Bush =

Welsh rugby union player (1879–1955)

Percy Frank Bush
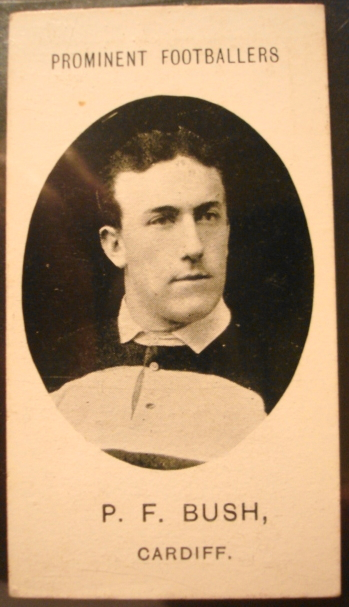
- Bush in his Cardiff jersey
- Born: 23 June 1879 Cardiff, Wales
- Died: 19 May 1955 (aged 75) Cardiff, Wales
- University: University College, Cardiff
- Occupation: School teacher

Rugby union career
- Position(s): Fly-half, half-back
Amateur team(s)
Years	Team	Apps	(Points)
- Cardiff Romilly
- University College Cardiff
- Penygraig RFC
1899–1913	Cardiff RFC		
- London Welsh RFC
1910	Stade Nantais		
- Glamorgan
International career
Years	Team	Apps	(Points)
1904	British Isles	4	(20)
1905–1910	Wales	8	(20)
- Correct as of 2007-07-27

Percy Frank Bush (23 June 1879 – 19 May 1955) was a Welsh rugby union player who played international rugby for Wales on eight occasions. Playing at fly-half, Bush is regarded as one of the most talented Welsh players of the pre-First World War era.

== Rugby career ==
Bush played most of his career for Cardiff RFC making 171 appearances and scoring 66 tries between 1899 and 1913. He captained the club for three seasons. He won eight caps for Wales (1905–1910), including for the famous Match of the Century, the 1905 victory over New Zealand. He also played in four tests for the 1904 British Isles on their tour to Australia and New Zealand. This was before he had been capped by Wales. He was the undoubted star of the tour, being dubbed 'Will o' the Wisp' by the Australian press for his devastating play.

== Cricket career ==
Bush also played county cricket for Glamorgan County Cricket Club and Marylebone Cricket Club. He played in three Minor Counties Cricket Championship matches between 1900 and 1903, all for Glamorgan. His first Minor Counties match was at St Helens against Wiltshire in 1900. Bush scored just 5 runs in his first innings, but his Glamorgan team won the match before he was required in the second innings. Bush failed to improve in his second match, played against Berkshire at the Cardiff Arms Park in 1902; scoring a single run in his only innings. Despite this Glamorgan won by an innings and ten runs. His final encounter for Glamorgan, was against a Surrey Second XI in 1903. Glamorgan lost the match by 61 runs, and Bush failed to enhance his record with 6 runs over two innings.

Rugby Union Captain
Preceded by Cecil Biggs	Cardiff RFC captain 1905–1907	Succeeded by Rhys Gabe
Preceded by Rhys Gabe	Cardiff RFC captain 1908–1909	Succeeded by Johnnie Williams
