= David Bedell-Sivright =

Scottish rugby union player (1880–1915)

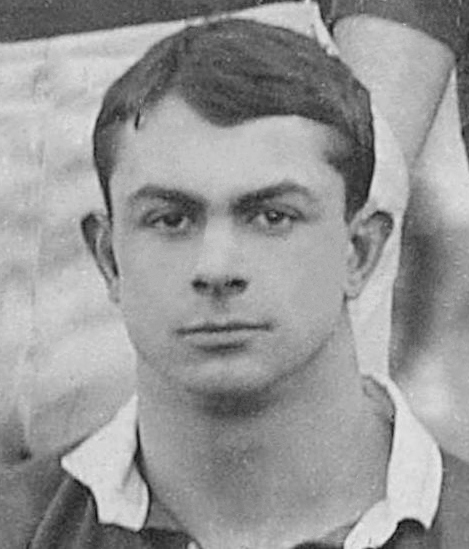
- Born: David Revell Bedell-Sivright; 8 December 1880 Edinburgh, Scotland
- Died: 5 September 1915 (aged 34) Gallipoli, Ottoman Turkey
- Height: 1.93 m (6 ft 4 in)
- School: Fettes College
- University: Trinity College, Cambridge
- Occupation: Surgeon

Rugby union career
- Position: Forward
Amateur team(s)
| Years | Team | Apps | (Points) |
| 1899–1903 | Cambridge University R.U.F.C. | | |
- Edinburgh University RFC
| 1901 | Fettesian-Lorettonian Club | | |
| 1903–07 | Barbarians | | |
| 1904– | West of Scotland F.C. | | |
| – | Edinburgh Wanderers FC | | |
Provincial / State sides
| Years | Team | Apps | (Points) |
- Edinburgh District
International career
| Years | Team | Apps | (Points) |
| 1900–08 | Scotland | 22 | (9) |
| 1903–04 | British Isles | 1 | (0) |
- Military career
- Allegiance: United Kingdom
- Branch: Royal Navy
- Service years: 1915
- Rank: Surgeon
- Units: Portsmouth Battalion, Royal Marine Light Infantry
- Conflicts: First World War: Gallipoli campaign (DOW)

David Revell "Darkie" Bedell-Sivright (8 December 1880 – 5 September 1915) was a Scottish international rugby union forward who captained both Scotland and the British Isles. Born in Edinburgh, and educated at Fettes College where he learned to play rugby, he studied at Cambridge University and earned four Blues playing for them in the Varsity Match. He was first selected for Scotland in 1900 in a match against Wales. After playing in all of Scotland's Home Nations Championship matches in 1901, 1902 and 1903, Bedell-Sivright toured with the British Isles side – now known as the British & Irish Lions – that toured South Africa in 1903. After playing the first 12 matches of the tour, he was injured and so did not play in any of the Test matches against South Africa.

The next year Bedell-Sivright was appointed captain for the British Isles team that toured Australia and New Zealand. Due to a broken leg he played only one Test match during the tour – against Australia – but was involved in a notable incident during a non-Test match. Despite not playing, Bedell-Sivright pulled the British team from the field for 20 minutes after disputing the decision by a local referee to send-off one of their players. Bedell-Sivright eventually allowed his side to resume play, but without their ejected teammate.

Following the tour Bedell-Sivright briefly settled in Australia, before returning to Scotland to study medicine. He captained Scotland against the touring New Zealanders in 1905, and in 1906 helped his country defeat the visiting South Africans 6–0. After retiring from international rugby in 1908 he went on to become Scotland's amateur boxing champion. A surgeon by profession, he joined the Royal Navy during the First World War, and died on active service during the Gallipoli Campaign.

Bedell-Sivright had a reputation as an aggressive and hard rugby player, as well as a ferocious competitor. He was an inaugural inductee into the Scottish Rugby Hall of Fame, and in 2013 was inducted into the International Rugby Board (IRB) Hall of Fame.

== Personal history ==
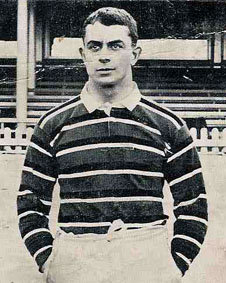
Bedell-Sivright c. 1904

David Bedell-Sivright was born in Edinburgh in 1880 to William Henry Revell Bedell-Sivright of North Queensferry. Bedell-Sivright was educated at Fettes College. before going to Trinity College, Cambridge in 1899 to read medicine. He later completed his medical training at the University of Edinburgh. His brother John played for Cambridge University RFC, and gained a single international cap in 1902.

There are many tales surrounding Bedell-Sivright, and it is difficult to separate fact from fiction. He had a reputation for aggression, and in 1909 became Scottish amateur boxing champion. After one international he rugby tackled a cart horse in Princes Street in Edinburgh after apparently laying down on a city tram track – this held up the traffic for an hour as no policeman would approach him. It is not clear exactly where Bedell-Sivright picked up the nickname "Darkie". One explanation is that it was due to "cynical" tactics he employed as captain, the other is that it was due to the dark rings around his eyes.

=== Military career ===
On 25 January 1915 Bedell-Sivright was commissioned as a surgeon in the Royal Navy. He was posted to the Hawke Battalion of the Royal Naval Division stationed at Gallipoli during the Dardanelles Campaign in May 1915. He was loaned to the Royal Scots Fusiliers from 8 to 20 June, and was then posted to the Portsmouth Battalion of Royal Marine Light Infantry. After a period onshore in the trenches while serving at an advanced dressing station, he was bitten by an unidentified insect. He complained of being fatigued and was taken offshore and transferred to the hospital ship HMHS Dunluce Castle. Two days later, on 5 September, he died of septicaemia and was buried at sea off Cape Helles. He is commemorated on the Portsmouth Naval Memorial.

== Rugby career ==
Bedell-Sivright learned his rugby while a student at Fettes College, but first came to note as a player when he represented Cambridge University in the Varsity matches – contested against Oxford University – between 1899 and 1902; this won him four sporting Blues. He was first capped for Scotland in 1900 in a match against Wales at St Helen's, Swansea. The match was a turning point for Welsh rugby, who won 12–3, (Note: Wales won the Home Nations Championship in 1900, and went on to endure a "Golden Age" until 1911.) but the selectors stuck with Bedell-Sivright who won another 21 caps for his country. He is the only Scottish player to have won three Triple Crowns – wins over Ireland, Wales and England within the same Home Nations Championship (now the Six Nations) – in 1901, 1903 and 1907.

In 1903 Bedell-Sivright was selected for his first match with invitational touring side the Barbarians. He played a total of five games for the side between 1903 and 1907, and captained them against Cardiff RFC in 1907.

Bedell-Sivright was later chosen to tour with two different British Isles teams. The first was the 1903 tour of South Africa under the captaincy of fellow Scottish international Mark Morrison. Although at the centre of the British Isles pack, Beddel-Sivright did not play in any of the test matches. He played in the first 12 tour matches, where the team won six and lost six, but was injured thereafter.

A captain of a team, like a general of an army, has an important part to play, and with every point he must be acquainted, or else disaster will almost invariably befall his side. The British team now on its way to Australasia will, judging from what one can learn, be well served in the way of leadership. D. R. Bedell-Sivright, who has been chosen as the skipper, has had vast experience as a leader.

— G. W. McArthur, selector of the 1904 British Isles team, on Bedell-Sivright

In 1904, at the request of the England Rugby Board (known as the Rugby Football Union), Bedell-Sivright was selected to lead a British Lions team on a tour of Australia and New Zealand. He only played in one Test, against Australia, because of a broken leg, but the team did go undefeated in Australia – winning all their matches there, and the three Test matches 17–0, 17–3 and 16–0. A notable incident on the Australian leg of the tour was a dispute between the British side and one of the Australian referees. The referee – Hugh Dolan – had ordered off British Isles player Denys Dobson after claiming Dobson had directed a personal insult at him. Bedell-Sivright was not playing, but pulled his team from the field for 20 minutes while disputing the decision with Dolan and the other officials. Eventually the British side returned to play, but without Dobson. Following the match Bedell-Sivright accused the referee of incompetence, and an inquiry eventually cleared Dobson of using indecent language, but he became the first British Isles player ever ordered off.

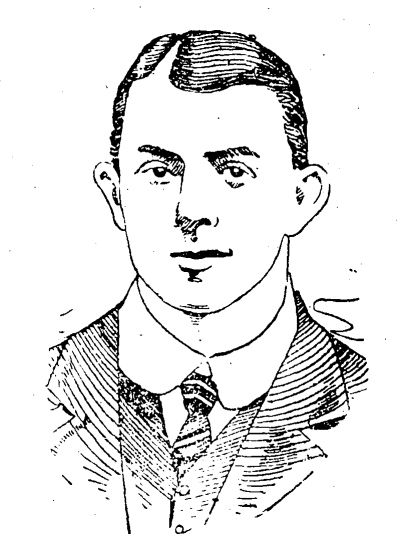
A sketch of Bedell-Sivright published prior to his tour of Australia with the 1904 British Isles team

The five-match New Zealand leg of the tour was far less successful for the British team. The tourists won their first two matches, but their third – the sole Test against New Zealand – was lost 9–3. Bedell-Sivright did not play in the Test after injuring himself in the teams' first New Zealand tour match, but blamed that loss, and their subsequent draw and loss (the final loss was 13–0 to Auckland) on fatigue after their tour of Australia. According to a New Zealand newspaper, Bedell-Sivright only ever claimed his side was "stale" after a loss, and never before. A New Zealand representative side was scheduled to tour the British Isles in 1905, and Bedell-Sivright did not report favourably on their chances of success. This may have contributed to the Home Nations underestimating the All Blacks – as the 1905 team become known – who ended up winning all but one of their 35 matches.

Bedell-Sivright was so impressed with Australia that he decided to settle there. After a year he became bored of jackarooing (stock-rearing), and decided to leave and head back to Scotland to study medicine. While studying in Edinburgh he joined the Edinburgh University RFC – captaining them for two seasons in 1906–07 and 1908–09. He had returned to Scotland in time to face the touring New Zealanders, and so he captained his country against them at Inverleith. The All Blacks had not been troubled in any of their previous matches on tour, scoring 612 points, and conceding only 15. Rugby writer Winston McCarthy described the Scottish forwards as "fast, vigorous and good dribblers", and they led 7–6 at half-time. However the New Zealanders were the better team, and scored six unanswered points in the second half to win 12–6.

In 1906 the South Africans were touring the British Isles, and Bedell-Sivright was selected for the Scotland side that defeated them 6–0. This was the last Home Nations team to defeat South Africa in nearly 60 years. Hence he became the first Home Nations' player to contest a Test match against each of Australia, New Zealand, and South Africa.

Bedell-Sivright was one of the inaugural inductees into the Scottish Rugby Hall of Fame in 2010, and in 2013 was inducted into the IRB Hall of Fame in a ceremony that honoured players from the British & Irish Lions (as the British Isles team is now known) and Australia during that year's Lions tour of Australia. Edinburgh University RFC have a scholarship in Bedell-Sivright's honour; the scholarships of between £500 and £2000 per year are intended "to attract the best young talent in the UK [United Kingdom] to play and study at The University of Edinburgh".

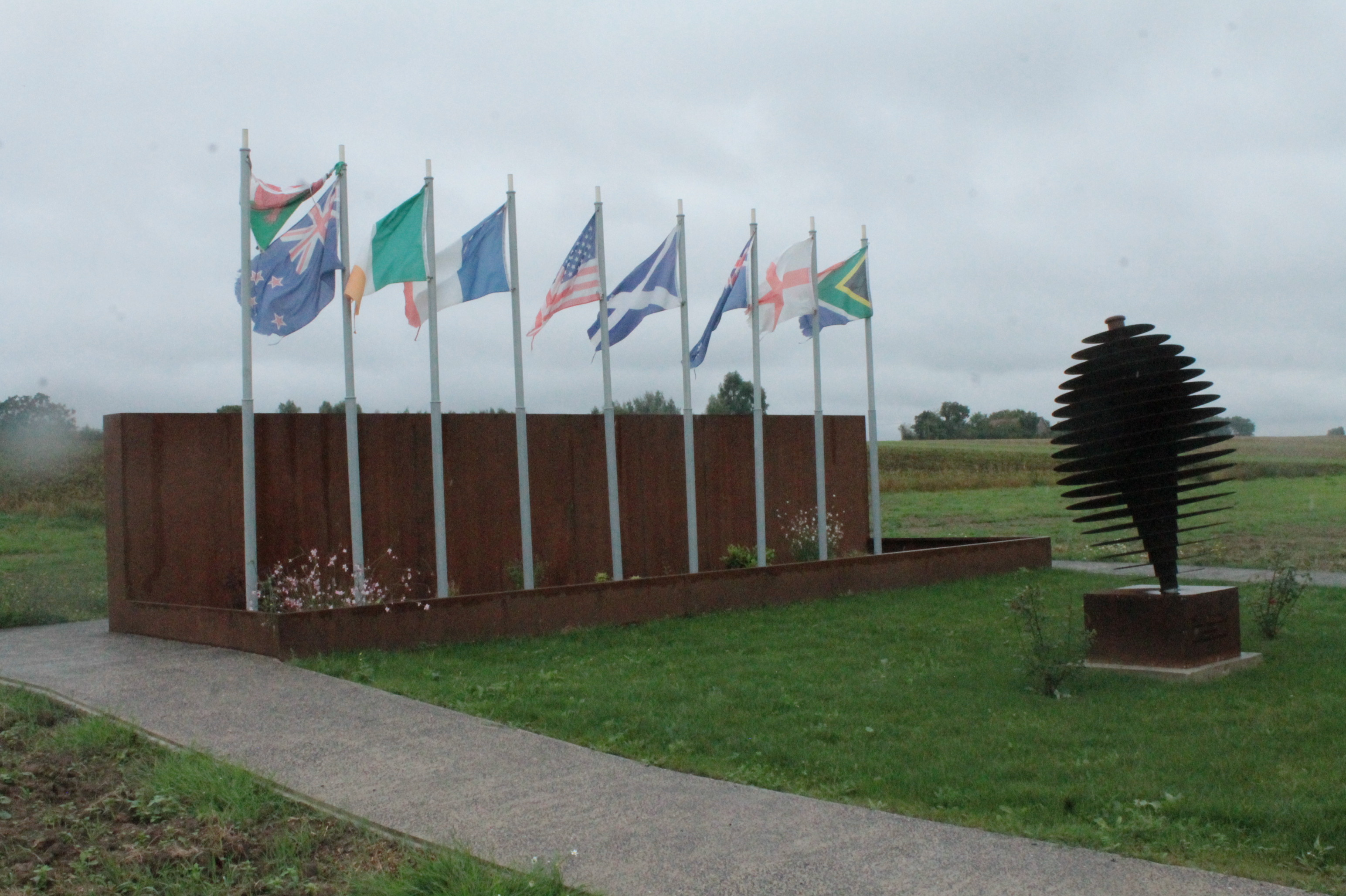
Memorial to the 133 rugby players killed in the Great War, at Fromelles, where David is listed

Writing in 1919, rugby journalist and author E. H. D. Sewell said of Bedell-Sivright "If a plebiscite was taken on the question: "Who was the hardest forward who ever played International football?" Sivright would get most votes if the voting was confined to players, and probably so in any event." Bedell-Sivright is described as one of the "hardest" men to ever play for Scotland, with author Nick Oswald – who wrote a book on the history of Scottish rugby – describing him as "a very aggressive forward. He didn't excel in any one aspect of the game, but he was an absolutely ferocious competitor." On hearing of his death, it was reported that:

It is cabled that Dr. D. R. Bedell-Sivright, who captained the British team in Australia and New Zealand in 1904, has died at the Dardanelles. He was a surgeon in the navy, and it is likely that he died on one of the warships engaged there against the Turks. Sivright was a Scottish forward of the most brilliant type, a hard player, but a clever one. He was one of the finest all-round forwards ever seen in Australia from over the seas. Among the forwards of the teams since 1899 he divided honours with A. F. Harding, the famous Welshman, and, at his best, was fit for a world's team. Sivright as captain was somewhat' dour, but as [a] player he was magnificent. A man of superb physique, it is hard to think that he has died an ordinary death at his age, and not to a bullet from the enemy.

— The Referee (Sydney), 15 September 1915

== International record ==
Home Nations Championship appearances for Scotland
| Country | 1900 | 1901 | 1902 | 1903 | 1904 | 1905 | 1906 | 1907 | 1908 |
|---|---|---|---|---|---|---|---|---|---|
| England | | X | X | X | | | X | X | |
| Ireland | | X | X | X | X | | X | X | X |
| Wales | X | X | X | X | X | | X | X | X |

Other Test appearances
| Team | Opponent | Date | Location | Score | Winner |
|---|---|---|---|---|---|
| British Isles | Australia | 2 July 1904 | Sydney | 0–17 | British Isles |
| Scotland | New Zealand | 18 November 1905 | Inverleith | 7–12 | New Zealand |
| Scotland | South Africa | 17 November 1906 | Glasgow | 6–0 | Scotland |

== See also ==
- List of international rugby union players killed in action during the First World War

== Bibliography ==
- McCarthy, Winston (1968). Haka! The All Blacks Story. London: Pelham Books.
- Elliott, Matt (2012). Dave Gallaher—The Original All Black Captain. Auckland, New Zealand: HarperCollinsPublishers. ISBN 978-1-86950-968-2.
