= Dave Gallaher =

New Zealand rugby union footballer

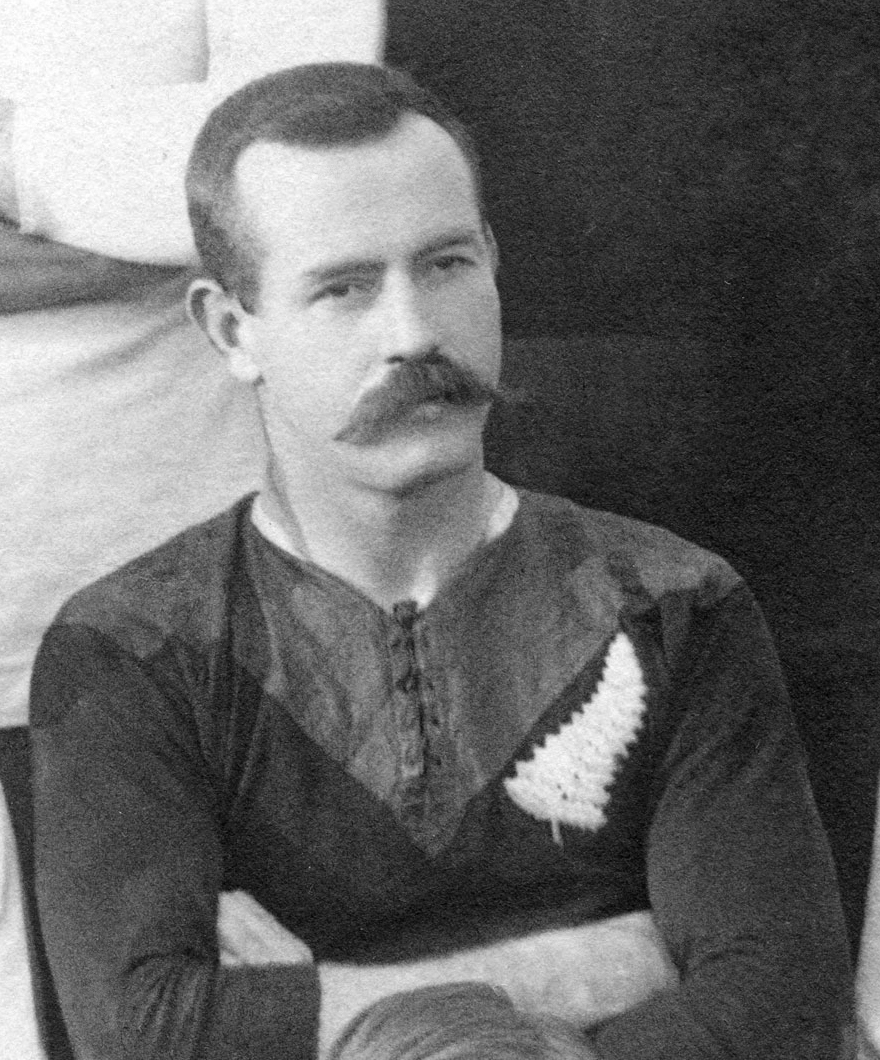
- Gallaher in 1905 during the Originals' tour
- Born: David Gallaher; 30 October 1873 Ramelton, County Donegal, Ireland
- Died: 4 October 1917 (aged 43) Broodseinde, Passchendaele salient, Belgium
- Height: 1.83 m (6 ft 0 in)
- Weight: 84 kg (13 st 3 lb)
- School: Katikati School
- Occupations: Freezing works foreman; soldier

Rugby union career
- Positions: Hooker; wing-forward
Amateur team(s)
Years	Team	Apps	(Points)
1896–1909	Ponsonby		
Provincial / State sides
Years	Team	Apps	(Points)
1896–1909	Auckland	26	
1903, 1905	North Island	2	
International career
Years	Team	Apps	(Points)
1903–1906	New Zealand	36	(14)
Coaching career
- Years: Team
- 1906–1915: Auckland
- 1908: New Zealand
- Military career
- Burial place: Nine Elms British Cemetery, Belgium
- Allegiance: New Zealand; United Kingdom
- Branch: New Zealand Army
- Service years: 1901–1902; 1916–1917
- Rank: Sergeant
- Service number: 3229; 32513
- Units: 6th New Zealand Contingent (1901‍–‍1902); 10th New Zealand Contingent (1902); 2nd Battalion, Auckland Regiment, New Zealand Division; (1916‍–‍1917)
- Conflicts: Second Boer War; First World War; Western Front; Battle of Messines; Battle of Passchendaele; Battle of Broodseinde (DOW)
- Memorials: Dave Gallaher Trophy; Gallaher Shield

David Gallaher (30 October 1873 – 4 October 1917) was an Irish-born New Zealand rugby union footballer best remembered as the captain of the "Original All Blacks"—the 1905–06 New Zealand national team, the first representative New Zealand side to tour the Irish and British Isles. Under Gallaher's leadership the Originals won 34 out of 35 matches over the course of tour, including legs in France and North America; the New Zealanders scored 976 points and conceded only 59. Before returning home he co-wrote the classic rugby text The Complete Rugby Footballer with his vice-captain Billy Stead. Gallaher retired as a player after the 1905–06 tour and took up coaching and selecting; he was a selector for both Auckland and New Zealand for most of the following decade.

Born in Ramelton, Ireland, Gallaher migrated to New Zealand with his family as a small child. After moving to Auckland, in 1895 he joined Ponsonby RFC and was selected for his province in 1896. In 1901–02 he served with the New Zealand Contingent in the Anglo–Boer War. He first appeared on the New Zealand national team for their unbeaten tour of Australia in 1903, and played in New Zealand's first ever Test match, against Australia in Sydney. The Originals Gallaher captained during 1905–06 helped to cement rugby as New Zealand's national sport, but he was relentlessly pilloried by the British press for his role as wing-forward. The use of a wing-forward, which critics felt was a tactic to deliberately obstruct opponents, contributed to decades of strain between the rugby authorities of New Zealand and the Home Nations; the International Rugby Football Board (IRFB) effectively outlawed the position in 1931.

During the First World War, Gallaher enlisted in the New Zealand Division to fight in Europe. He was fatally wounded by shrapnel wounds to the head in 1917 at the Battle of Passchendaele in Belgium. He has since been inducted into the World Rugby Hall of Fame, International Rugby Hall of Fame, and the New Zealand Sports Hall of Fame. A number of memorials exist in Gallaher's honour, including the Gallaher Shield for the winner of Auckland's club championship, and the Dave Gallaher Trophy contested between the national teams of France and New Zealand.

== Early life ==
Dave Gallaher was born as David Gallagher on 30 October 1873 at Ramelton, County Donegal, Ireland, the third son of James Henry Gallagher, a 69-year-old shopkeeper, and his 29-year-old wife, Maria Hardy Gallagher (née McCloskie). James was a widower who had married Maria in 1866, a year after the death of his first wife. James had two children from his first marriage, and David was the seventh from his marriage to Maria. The couple had three more children after David, but of their ten offspring, three died in infancy. The couple's other offspring were: Joseph (born 1867), Isabella (1868), James (1869), Maria (called Molly, 1870), Jane (1871), Thomas (1872), William (1875), Oswald (1876), and James Patrick (1878). (Note: Isabella, James and Jane all died as infants.) David was baptised as a Presbyterian in the First Ramelton Meeting House on 8 January 1874.

After struggling in his drapery business in Ramelton, James decided to emigrate with his family to New Zealand as part of George Vesey Stewart's Katikati Special Settlement scheme. In May 1878 the Gallaghers – minus the sick James Patrick who at eight weeks old was too weak to make the trip (Note: James Patrick was left with family in Ireland; he died aged two.) – sailed from Belfast on the Lady Jocelyn for Katikati in the Bay of Plenty. On arriving in New Zealand, the family altered their surname to "Gallaher" in an effort to reduce confusion over its spelling and pronunciation.

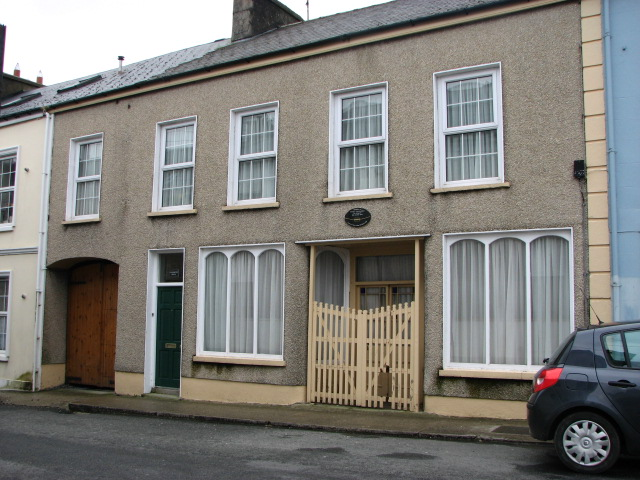
The house where Gallaher was born in Ramelton, Ireland. A plaque above the door commemorates his contributions to New Zealand rugby.

The Gallaher couple and their six children arrived in Auckland after a three-month voyage, and from there sailed to Tauranga in the Bay of Plenty, before their final voyage to Katikati. On arrival they found the settlement scheme was not what they had envisaged or been promised: the land allocated to the family required enormous work to be broken in before being suitable for farming, there was no easy access to water, and the settlement was very hilly. It had been hoped that James would be employed as the agent for the Donegal Knitting Company in New Zealand, which was to be established by Lord George Hill. But Hill died unexpectedly and his successor did not support the initiative. As the family's poor quality land was insufficient to make a living, the children's mother Maria soon became the chief breadwinner after she obtained a position teaching for £2 a week at the new No. 2 School.

In January 1886 David spent a week in Auckland hospital undergoing surgery to treat stunted muscles in his left leg which had led to curvature of his spine. His mother became sick that same year, and in 1887 lost her teaching position. His mother's condition worsened and she died of cancer on 9 September 1887. With a father in his seventies, the 13-year-old David was compelled to leave school so he could help his brothers to support the family. He took a job with a local stock and station agent.

The older Gallaher children had to work to prevent the local authorities from putting their younger siblings up for adoption. In 1889, with the exception of William who remained in Katikati, the family joined Joseph in Auckland, where he had found work. David – who was by now 17 years old – was able to obtain work at the Northern Roller Mills Company, and was soon a member of the firm's junior cricket team. In the late 1890s Gallaher took employment at the Auckland Farmers' Freezing Company as a labourer; by the time of his deployment for the First World War two decades later he had risen to the position of foreman. His work required the constant handling of heavy animal carcasses, which helped him build upper body strength and kept him fit.

== Early rugby career ==
Gallaher first gained attention for his talents as a rugby player while living in Katikati. After moving to Auckland, he played junior rugby for Parnell from 1890. He joined the Ponsonby District Rugby Football Club in 1895, after the family moved to Freemans Bay following Joseph's marriage to Nell Burchell. Gallaher, who played at hooker, was selected for an Auckland "B" side that year, and made his debut for Auckland against the touring Queensland team on 8 August 1896. The Aucklanders won 15–6. Gallaher was retained for Auckland's remaining fixtures that season: defeats to Wellington, Taranaki and Otago.

In 1897, Gallaher's Ponsonby won eight of their nine matches en route to the Auckland club championship. He was selected to play for Auckland against the New Zealand representative side that had just completed a tour of Australia. The Aucklanders won 11–10 after scoring a late try; it was only New Zealand's second loss of their eleven-match tour. Later that year Gallaher was selected for Auckland's three-match tour where they defeated Taranaki, Wellington and Wanganui. Wellington's defeat was their first loss at home since the formation of the Wellington Rugby Football Union in 1879. The following season was less eventful for Gallaher – he played much of the season for Ponsonby, but injury prevented his selection for Auckland.

After missing the 1898 season for Auckland, Gallaher continued to be selected for the union throughout 1899 and 1900. The side was undefeated over this time; he played for them twice in 1899, and in all four matches in 1900. He represented Auckland a total of 26 times over his career.

== Anglo-Boer War ==
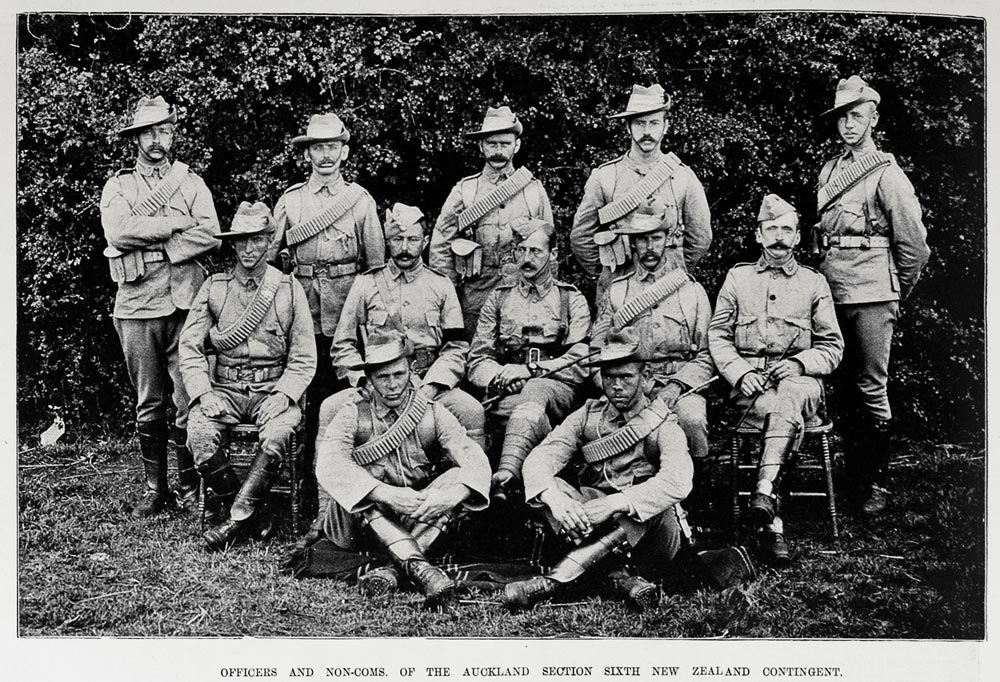
Gallaher with other corporals, sergeants and officers of the Sixth New Zealand Contingent before their departure for South Africa. Gallaher, then a corporal, is standing in the back row, second from right.

In January 1901 Gallaher joined the Sixth New Zealand Contingent of Mounted Rifles for service in the Anglo-Boer War. When enlisting he gave his date of birth as 31 October 1876, three years later than the actual date. It is unknown why he did this but the later date continued to be used in official records for the rest of his life. Gallaher was given a send-off dinner by his Ponsonby club before the contingent departed from Auckland on 31 January. After disembarking in South Africa at East London on 14 March 1901, Gallaher's contingent immediately embarked for Pretoria, and it was there that, as part of forces under the command of General Herbert Plumer, they set about their task of "rid[ding] the Northern Transvaal of Boer guerrillas and sympathizers."

A member of the contingent's 16th (Auckland) Company, he served in the advanced guard, who scouted ahead of the main force. In October 1901 Gallaher contracted malaria, and was hospitalised in Charlestown, Natal. In a letter he composed to his sister while recovering he wrote:

we have been all over S[outh] Africa pretty well I believe, on the trek the whole time and it looks as if we will be trekking till the end of the Chapter. We have a fair share of the fighting all the time and I am still alive and kicking although I have had a couple of pretty close calls, one day I thought I would have to say good bye to old New Zealand but I had my usual luck and so came out all right

— Dave Gallaher, Letter to his sister Molly, 18 October 1901

Between late December 1901 and early January 1902 Gallaher and his contingent were involved in a number of skirmishes. He described one incident where he had several Boer fighters in his sights, but did not have "the heart" to fire at them while they rescued one of their comrades. Describing a later encounter to his sister, Gallaher wrote: "We had a total of 22 killed and 36 injured and a few taken prisoners[;] it was a pretty mournful sight to see the Red Cross bearers cruising around the field fetching all the dead and wounded who were laying all over the place". By March 1902 Gallaher had reached the rank of squadron sergeant-major, and his contingent was on its way to Durban. There the unit boarded ship for New Zealand, but Gallaher stayed behind, transferring to the Tenth New Zealand Contingent. His new unit did not see active service in South Africa, and he returned with them to New Zealand in August 1902. For his service Gallaher received the Queen's South Africa Medal (Cape Colony, Orange Free State, and Transvaal Clasps), and King's South Africa Medal (South Africa 1901 and South Africa 1902 Clasps).

== Resumption of his rugby career ==
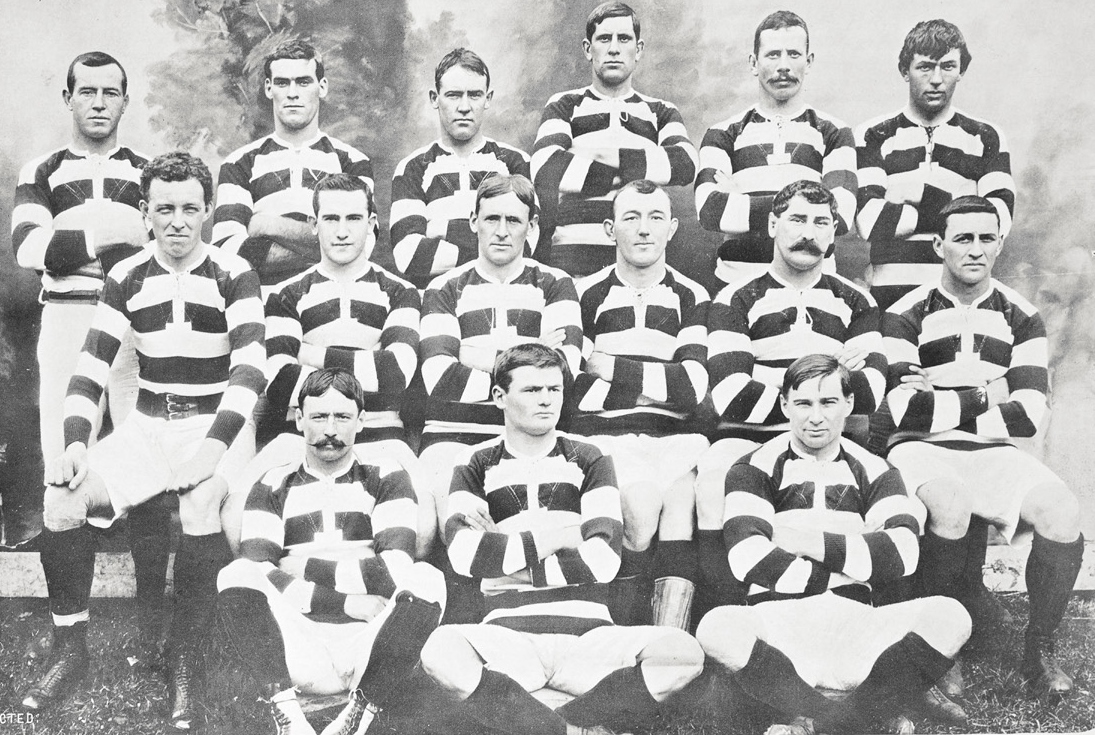
Gallaher with other members of the Auckland side that defeated the visiting British Isles team in 1904. Gallaher is standing in the back row on the far left.

During his time in South Africa Gallaher did play some rugby, But he was not fit enough to play immediately upon his return to New Zealand, and so did not resume playing rugby for Ponsonby until the 1903 season. When he did return for his club, for the first match of the year, he was described as "the outstanding forward" in a comprehensive defeat of Parnell.

Despite having missed two seasons of provincial rugby, Gallaher was included in the 22-man New Zealand representative squad to tour Australia during 1903. He was the first Ponsonby player ever to play for the New Zealand team, commonly known as the "All Blacks". The 1903 team to Australia was, according to Winston McCarthy's 1968 history of the All Blacks, "still regarded by old-timers as the greatest team to ever leave New Zealand." The tour did not start well – a preliminary match in New Zealand, against Wellington, was lost 14–5, though Gallaher did score his first try for his country.

Gallaher played eight matches – the first four as hooker and the remainder as wing-forward (Note: For a description of the archaic wing-forward position and 2-3-2 scrum formation used by teams throughout New Zealand at the time see Thomas Ellison § Wing-forward.) – out of eleven during the six-week tour. The party was captained by the veteran Otago player Jimmy Duncan, who was widely recognised as a master tactician. The first match in Australia, against New South Wales, was won 12–0 by the New Zealanders, despite their having a man sent off. After playing a Combined Western Districts side, New Zealand played a second match against New South Wales. New Zealand won again, but only 3–0 on a flooded pitch at Sydney Cricket Ground. The side continued touring the state before making their way north to Queensland, where they twice played the state side. The New Zealanders then returned to New South Wales, where the first-ever Australia–New Zealand rugby union Test match took place in Sydney.

Since the selection of the first New Zealand team in 1884, inter-colonial games had been played against New South Wales (ten New Zealand wins from thirteen matches), and Queensland (seven New Zealand wins from seven), but none had been contested against a combined Australian side. The match – won 22–3 by the New Zealanders, who scored three tries to nil – marked Gallaher's first international cap. The last match of the tour was against New South Wales Country; New Zealand won 32–0. On their ten-match tour of Australia, New Zealand had scored 276 points and conceded only 13.

Back in New Zealand, Gallaher was selected for the North Island in his first ever Inter-Island match; the South won 12–5. He then continued playing for Auckland, who were conducting a tour of both islands. Gallaher appeared in six of their seven matches, against Taranaki, Wellington, Southland, Otago, Canterbury, and South Canterbury. Auckland lost the first two matches, but won the others.

In 1904 the first Ranfurly Shield match was played. The shield, a provincial challenge trophy won by defeating the holder, was to become the most prestigious trophy in domestic New Zealand rugby. Due to their unmatched provincial record at the time Auckland were awarded the shield. The first shield challenge was played against Wellington, who were not expected to pose much of a threat. Auckland had not lost at home in six years, but, with Gallaher in the side, were upset 6–3 by the Wellingtonians. Gallaher was then selected for the New Zealand team that faced the touring British Isles in what was New Zealand's first Test match on home soil. The British team were conducting a tour of Australia and New Zealand, and had finished their Australian leg unbeaten.

Jimmy Duncan, who was coaching New Zealand after retiring as a player, said before the historic match: "I have given them directions. It's man for man all the time, and I have bet Gallaher a new hat that he can't catch [Percy] Bush. Bush has never been collared in Australia but he'll get it today." The match was tied 3–3 at half-time, but New Zealand were the stronger side in the second half and eventually won 9–3. Gallaher was praised by press for his all-round display at wing-forward, but in particular for his successful harassment of the British Isles' half-back Tommy Vile.

The New Zealand defeat was the first tour loss for the British side, who then drew with a combined Taranaki-Wanganui-Manawatu side before travelling to Auckland. Gallaher played for Auckland against the tourists and scored one of the tries in their 13–0 victory. He was part of a forward pack that dominated their opponents, and again he troubled Vile; his tackling of Vile and Bush killed many British attacks. The rugby historian Terry McLean would write in 1987 that "his display could be ranked with the finest exhibitions of wing-forward play". Gallaher represented Auckland once more in 1904, a 3–0 loss to Taranaki.

== 1905 tour ==
=== Background and preparations ===
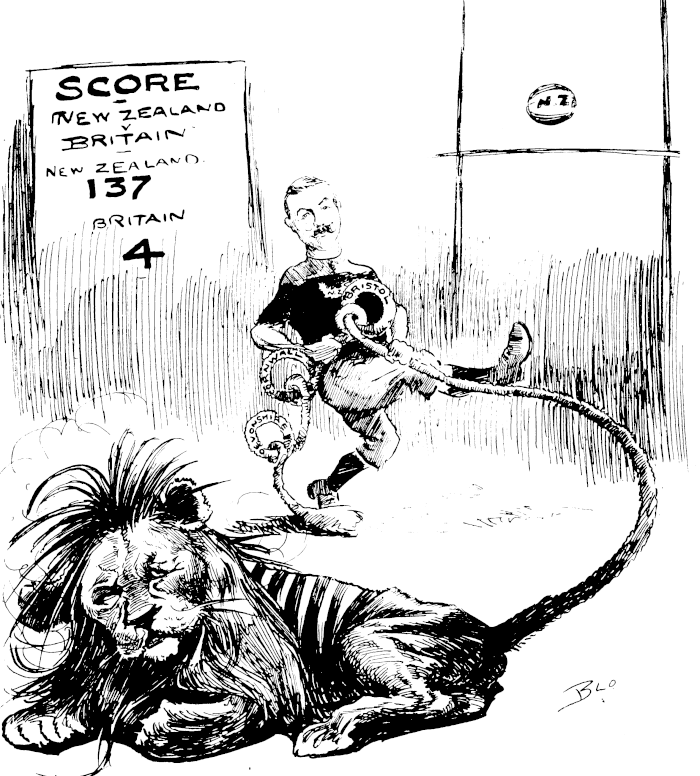
Cartoon by William Blomfield, published in the New Zealand Observer in 1905. "Aha," Gallaher is depicted as saying, "I'll have to give the tail of the British Lion another twist to stir him up. And they said England was the home of Rugby Football."

At the end of the 1904 season the New Zealand Rugby Football Union (NZRFU) suspended Gallaher from playing after a disagreement over a claim for expenses he had submitted to the Auckland Rugby Football Union for travel to play in the match against the British Isles. Eventually the matter was resolved when, under protest, Gallaher repaid the disputed amount. This settlement, coupled with his performance in 26–0 North Island win over the South Island in the pre-tour trial, allowed Gallaher to be considered for selection for New Zealand's 1905–06 tour of Europe and North America. The NZRFU had been trying to secure an invitation to send a team to Britain for some time, and were finally able to secure satisfactory financial guarantees to proceed in 1905. This was the first representative New Zealand team to undertake such a tour, though a privately organised team, the New Zealand Natives, had preceded them in 1888–89. (Note: The 1888–89 Natives was a team of predominantly Māori players that toured the British Isles and Australia. They played three "internationals" against England, Ireland and Wales. The team was privately funded and organised, with the New Zealand Rugby Football Union not formed until 1892.)

The NZRFU named Gallaher captain for the tour, with Billy Stead as vice-captain. A week into the voyage to Britain aboard the SS Rimutaka, rumours circulated that some of the southern players were unhappy with the appointment of Gallaher, and with what they perceived as an Auckland bias in the squad. The dissidents contended that the captain and vice-captain should have been elected by the players, as they had been on the 1897 and 1903 tours to Australia. Gallaher recognised the damage factionalism might do to the team and offered to resign, as did the vice-captain Stead. Although the teams' manager refused to accept the resignations, the players still took a vote—17 out of 29 endorsed the NZRFU's selections.

During the voyage to England the team conducted training drills on the ship's deck; for this the forwards were coached by Gallaher and fellow player Bill Cunningham, while Stead was in charge of the backs. Consequently, the services of the NZRFU-appointed coach Jimmy Duncan were not used; his appointment had caused opposition from many in the squad who believed his expertise was not required, and that an extra player should have been taken on tour instead. After a six-week voyage, the team arrived in Plymouth, England on 8 September 1905.

=== Early tour matches ===
No man before or since has been pilloried as was Gallaher in the British Isles in 1905, both by press and public. Castigated from all angles, Gallaher, in his firm belief that the wing-forward tactics were within the Laws, took it all with serenity.

— Winston McCarthy, Haka! The All Blacks Story, 1968

The New Zealanders' first match was against the Devon county side at Exeter. A close contest was expected, but New Zealand ran out 55–4 winners, scoring twelve tries and conceding only a drop-goal. Reaction to the match was mixed – the team were accompanied by a cheering crowd and marching band following the win, but Gallaher's play at wing-forward provoked some criticism in the press.

The use of a wing-forward was a distinctive feature of New Zealand play. Instead of having eight men in the scrum as was normal elsewhere, seven men were used – the missing man, the wing-forward, instead fed the ball into the scrum then held onto one of their hookers while the ball progressed through the scrum to their half-back. (Note: Under this scrum configuration there were no props, but instead two hookers.) With the wing-forward bound to the side of the scrum, the opposing half-back would then have to manoeuvre past him to tackle the player with the ball. This increased the amount of time the half-back would have in possession of the ball before his opposite could tackle him.

The use of this new tactic by New Zealand meant that Gallaher, the team's wing-forward, was repeatedly accused by the English of obstruction, though the referee Percy Coles, an official of the English Rugby Football Union (RFU), rarely penalised him in the Devon match. The Originals' fullback Billy Wallace posited that New Zealand's superior scrum made Gallaher's style of play more prominent. Unlike British and Irish teams of the time, New Zealand employed specialist positions for their forwards. Despite often facing an extra man in the scrum, the New Zealanders "drove like a cleaver through British forward packs". Gallaher later said: "I think my play is fair – I sincerely trust so – and surely the fact that both Mr Percy Coles and Mr D. H. Bowen – two of the referees of our matches, and fairly representative of English and Welsh ideas, have taken no exception so it ought to have some weight." The British press, looking to find fault in New Zealand's play, continued to criticise Gallaher throughout the tour. Gallaher believed the key to his side's success was a difference in playing styles, while Winston McCarthy believed the unique backline formation to be a major factor. (Note: This involved the use of two "five-eighths" rather than an extra half-back and centre three-quarter. For a detailed explanation of the formation see The Original All Blacks § Innovations and tactics.)

Following the opening match the "All Blacks" – as the New Zealand team came to be known (Note: For background on how the name was popularised on the tour see The Original All Blacks § Name.) – defeated Cornwall and then Bristol, both 41–0. They then defeated Northampton 32–0. The tour continued in much the same way, with the All Blacks defeating Leicester, Middlesex, Durham, Hartlepool Clubs and Northumberland; in nearly all cases the defeats were inflicted without conceding any points (the one exception being Durham, who scored a try against New Zealand). The New Zealanders then comfortably defeated Gloucester and Somerset before facing Devonport Albion, the incumbent English club champions, who had not lost at home in 18 months. New Zealand beat them 21–3 in front of a crowd of 20,000. Gallaher scored the All Blacks' final try, an effort described by the Plymouth Herald as, "... a gem. It was a tearing rush for about fifty yards with clockwork-like passing all the way."

New Zealand won their next seven matches, including victories over Blackheath, Oxford University and Cambridge University. Billy Wallace contended that the New Zealanders' form peaked with the win over Blackheath; he recalled that "after this game injuries began to take their toll and prevented us ever putting in so fine a team again on the tour." By the time the All Blacks played their first Test match, against Scotland, the team had played and won nineteen matches, and scored 612 points while conceding only 15.

=== Scotland, Ireland and England internationals ===
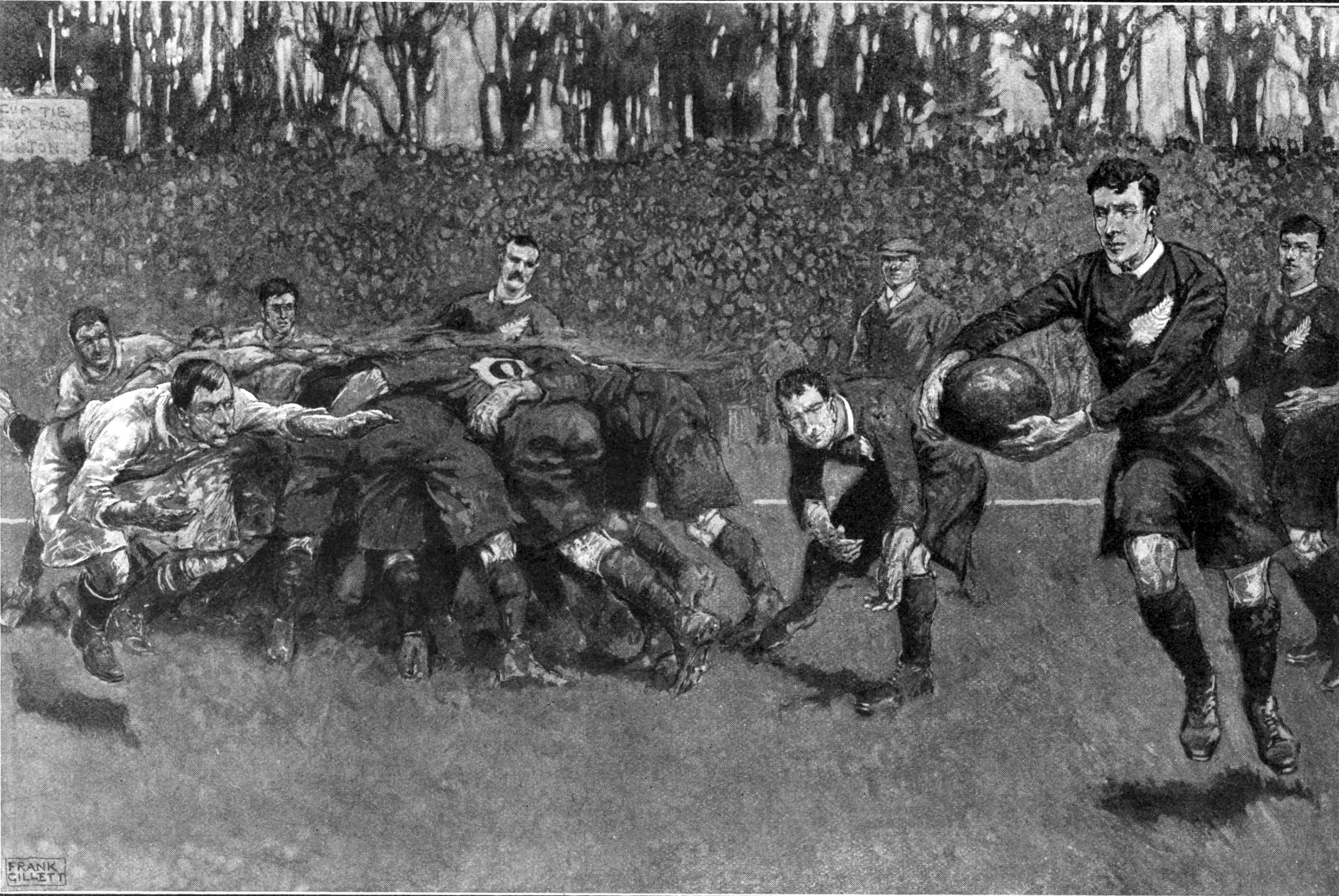
Painting by Frank Gillett published in The Graphic following the All Blacks' 15–0 victory over England. Gallaher, wearing black and playing wing-forward, can be seen standing on the far side of the scrum.

The Scottish Football Union (SFU), the governing body for rugby union in Scotland, did not give the New Zealanders an official welcome, and sent only one official to greet them on their arrival in Edinburgh. In addition, the SFU refused a financial guarantee for the match, promising the gate receipts to the New Zealanders instead; (Note: The other three Home Unions had guaranteed the NZRFU £200 for their internationals.) this meant that the NZRFU had to take on all monetary responsibilities for the match. (Note: In addition, the SFU initially refused to award their players caps for the match, and even demanded that the New Zealanders supply the ball.) One reason for the cold reception from the SFU may have been because of negative reports from David Bedell-Sivright, who was Scotland's captain and had also captained the British Isles team on their 1904 tour of New Zealand. Bedell-Sivright had reported unfavourably on his experiences in New Zealand the previous year, especially regarding the wing-forward play of Gallaher.

When time for the Scotland Test did arrive, it was discovered that as the ground had not been covered for protection from the elements, and had frozen over. The SFU wanted to abandon the match, but Gallaher and the tour manager George Dixon contended that the weather would improve enough for the pitch to thaw, and the match was eventually allowed to proceed. The Test was closely contested, with Scotland leading 7–6 at half-time, but the All Blacks scored two late tries to win 12–7; (Note: New Zealand scored four tries (with three points each), and Scotland a try and drop-goal (worth four points).) despite the close score-line, the New Zealanders were clearly the better of the two sides.

Four days later the tourists played a West of Scotland selection, where they received a much warmer reception than for the Scotland match, then travelled via Belfast to Dublin where they faced Ireland. Gallaher did not play in either match due to a leg injury suffered during the Scotland Test. New Zealand won the Ireland match 15–0, then defeated a team representing Munster province.

By the time of New Zealand's next game, against England in London, Gallaher had recovered from his injury enough to play. Between 40,000 and 80,000 saw the match. (Note: The discrepancy in crowd size is because of the unknown number of non-paying spectators.) The All Blacks scored five tries (four by Duncan McGregor, playing at wing) to win 15–0. According to the England player Dai Gent, the victory would have been even greater had the match conditions been dry. "One cannot help thinking that England might have picked a stronger side," said Gallaher. "From our experience, we did not think that this side was fully representative of the best men to be found in the country." Observers noted that Gallaher still seemed to be suffering from his leg injury during the match. New Zealand played three more matches in England – wins over Cheltenham, Cheshire, and Yorkshire – before travelling on to Wales.

=== Wales ===
Wales were the dominant rugby country of the four Home Nations, and in the middle of a "golden age" at the time. (Note: Wales had won the Triple Crown in 1905, and were unbeaten at home since the 1890s.) Many commentators in both New Zealand and the United Kingdom felt the Welsh test was the best chance of stopping an All Blacks clean sweep. As such, the game was billed as the "Match of the Century" even before the tourists had left New Zealand.

Gallaher and his team faced them three days after the Yorkshire match. The All Blacks had thus far played 27 matches on tour, scoring 801 points while conceding only 22, and all in only 88 days. They were struggling to field fifteen fit players; a number of their best players, including Stead, were unavailable due to injury.

The match was preceded by an All Black haka, to which the crowd responded with the Welsh national song "Land of my Fathers". Wales had developed tactics to negate the seven-man New Zealand scrum, and removed a man from their scrum to play as a "rover", equivalent to Gallaher's wing-forward position. Gallaher was consistently penalised by the Scottish referee, John Dallas, who held that the New Zealander was feeding the ball into the scrum incorrectly. This eventually compelled Gallaher to instruct his team not to contest the scrums, and therefore give Wales possession following each scrum. Bob Deans, playing at wing for New Zealand that day, later said that Dallas had gone "out to penalise Gallaher – there is no doubt about that". Teddy Morgan scored an unconverted try for Wales shortly before half-time to give the home side a 3–0 lead.

The New Zealand backs had been poor in the first half, and the side's general form was well below that of earlier in the tour. However New Zealand were generally perceived to be the better side in the second half, with the performance of the Welsh fullback Bert Winfield keeping his team in the game. The most controversial moment of the tour happened late in the second half. Wallace recovered a Welsh kick and cut across the field, and with only Winfield to beat, passed to the New Zealand wing Deans. What happened next has provoked intense debate: Deans was tackled by the Welsh and either fell short of the try-line, or placed the ball over it before being dragged back. Dallas, who had dressed in heavy clothing and was struggling to keep up with the pace of the game, was 30 yards (27 m) behind play. When he arrived he ruled that Deans was short of the try-line, and so did not award New Zealand a try. Play continued, but the All Blacks could not score, and Wales won 3–0. This was New Zealand's first loss of the tour.

Following the match Gallaher was asked if he was unhappy with any aspect of the game; he replied that "the better team won and I am content." When asked about Dallas's refereeing, he said: "I have always made it a point never to express a view regarding the referee in any match in which I have played". Gallaher was gracious in defeat, but Dixon was highly critical of both Dallas and the Welsh newspapers, who he accused of "violently and unjustly" attacking New Zealand's captain. Gallaher would later admit that he had been annoyed by this criticism, which he found unfair; he also pointed out that though the Welsh condemned the wing-forward position, they had themselves adopted some elements of it. Later during the tour, when discussing the issue of his feeding the ball into the scrum, he said:

No referee could accuse me throughout the tour of putting the ball in unfairly or of putting 'bias' on it. I would be quite content to accept the verdict on such referees as Mr. Gil Evans or Mr. Percy Coles on the point. There were times when the scrum work was done so neatly that as soon as the ball had left my hands the forwards shoved over the top of it, and it was heeled out, and Roberts was off with it before you could say 'knife'. It was all over so quickly that almost everyone – the referee sometimes included – thought there was something unfair about it, some 'trickery' and that the ball had not only been put in but passed out unfairly. People here have been accustomed when the ball was put into the scrum to see it wobbling about and frequently never coming out in a proper way. How can a man possibly put 'bias' on a ball if he rolls it into the scrum? The only way to put my screw on a ball would be, I would say, to throw it straight down, shoulder high, on to its end, so that it may possibly bounce in the desired direction. I have never done that – in fact, it can't be done in the scrum and if I had ever attempted it I should have expected to be penalised immediately.

Four more matches were contested in Wales, with Gallaher appearing in three. He played in the match against Glamorgan, won by New Zealand 9–0, but had his finger bitten, which was serious enough for him to miss the fixture against Newport. He returned to face Cardiff, the Welsh champions, on Boxing Day. The All Blacks were again troubled in the scrum, this time after losing a player to injury. (Note: There was no provision for injury replacements.) The New Zealanders won, but narrowly; Gallaher asserted after the match that Cardiff were the strongest club side they had met during the tour. New Zealand then faced Swansea in their last match in the British Isles. Gallaher again struggled to field a fit side, and at 3–0 down late in the match they were heading for their second defeat on tour. Wallace kicked a drop-goal – then worth four points – late in the game to give the All Blacks a narrow 4–3 victory.

=== France, North America, and return ===
The side departed Wales and travelled to Paris, where they faced France on 1 January 1906, in the home side's first ever Test match. The All Blacks led 18–3 at half time. After the French scored their second try, giving them 8 points – the most any team had scored against the All Blacks – the New Zealanders responded with six unanswered tries to win 38–8. They then returned to London, where they learned that New Zealand's Prime Minister, Richard Seddon, had arranged for them to return home via North America. Not all of the players were keen on the idea, and four did not make the trip, but the new plans did give the team over two weeks to spend in England before their departure.

Before the New Zealand squad left Britain for North America, the English publisher Henry Leach asked Stead and Gallaher to author a book on rugby tactics and play. They finished the task in under a fortnight and were each paid £50. Entitled The Complete Rugby Footballer, the book was 322 pages long and included chapters on tactics and play, as well as a summary of rugby's history in New Zealand including the 1905 tour. It was mainly authored by Stead, a bootmaker, with Gallaher contributing most of the diagrams. Gallaher almost certainly made some contributions to the text, including sections on Auckland club rugby, and on forward play. The book showed the All Blacks' tactics and planning to be superior to others of the time, and according to Matt Elliott is "marvellously astute"; it received universal acclaim on its publication. According to a 2011 assessment by ESPN's Graham Jenkins, it "remains one of the most influential books produced in the realms of rugby literature".

The New Zealanders travelled to New York City, where they played an exhibition game, then on to San Francisco. There they played two official matches against British Columbia, and won both easily. The tour programme thus ended; New Zealand had played 35 games and lost only once. Gallaher had played in 26 of those matches, including four Tests. Over their 32 matches in the British Isles New Zealand scored 830 points and conceded 39; overall they scored 976 points and conceded only 59. On their arrival back in New Zealand on 6 March 1906, the All Blacks were welcomed by a crowd of 10,000 before being hosted at a civic reception in Auckland. Invited to speak at the reception, Gallaher said: "We did not go behind our back to talk about the Welshman, but candidly said that on that day the better team had won. I have one recommendation to make to the New Zealand [Rugby] Union, if it was to undertake such a tour again, and that is to play the Welsh matches first."

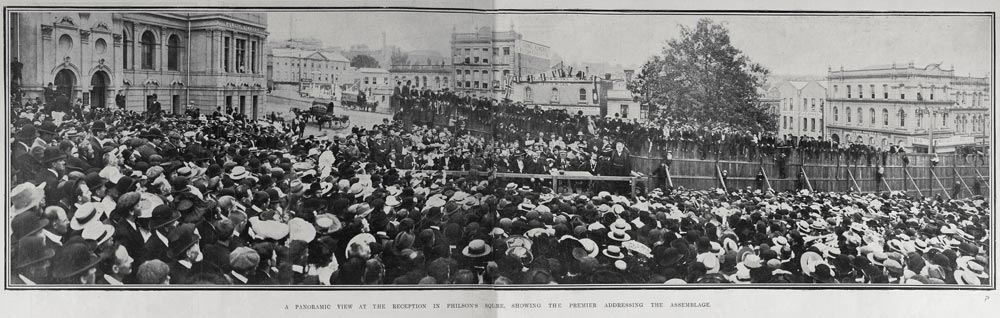
The civic reception in Auckland following the side's arrival back in New Zealand. The Prime Minister Richard Seddon is standing on the dais addressing the crowd.

=== Aftermath and impact ===
The 1905–06 Originals are remembered as perhaps the greatest of All Black sides, and set the standard for all their successors. They introduced a number of innovations to Britain and Ireland, including specialised forward positions and unfamiliar variations in attacking plays. But while their success helped establish rugby as New Zealand's national sport and fed a growing sporting nationalism, the controversial wing-forward position contributed to strained ties with the Home Nations' rugby authorities. British and Irish administrators were also wary of New Zealand's commitment to the amateur ethos, and questioned their sportsmanship. According to the historian Geoffrey Vincent, many in the traditional rugby establishment believed that: "Excessive striving for victory introduced an unhealthy spirit of competition, transforming a character-building 'mock fight' into 'serious fighting'. Training and specialization degraded sport to the level of work."

The success of the Originals provoked plans for a professional team of players to tour England and play Northern Union clubs in what is now known as rugby league. Unlike rugby league, which was professional, rugby union was strictly amateur at the time, (Note: The International Rugby Board – now called World Rugby – slowly loosened the amateur regulations, especially for international players, before declaring the game "open" to professionals in late 1995.) and in 1907 a professional team from New Zealand known as the "All Golds" (originally a play on "All Blacks") toured England and Wales before introducing rugby league to both New Zealand and Australia. (Note: The All Golds appropriated the playing colours and name of the All Blacks for their tour.) According to historian Greg Ryan, the All Golds tour "confirmed many British suspicions about the rugby culture that had shaped the 1905 team."

These factors may have contributed to the gap between All Black tours of the British Isles – they next toured in 1924. (Note: South African teams were twice invited to tour the British Isles in the meantime.) The NZRFU was denied representation on the International Rugby Football Board (IRFB) – composed exclusively of English, Irish, Scottish and Welsh members – until 1948. After complaining about the wing-forward for years, the Home Nations-administered IRFB made a series of law changes that effectively outlawed the position in 1931.

== Auckland and All Black selector ==
Gallaher retired from playing after the All Blacks' tour, but remained involved in the sport as a coach and selector. He coached at age group level for Ponsonby and in 1906 succeeded Fred Murray as sole selector of the Auckland provincial team. He was Auckland selector until 1916; over this time Auckland played 65 games, won 48, lost 11 and drew 6. Gallaher did make a brief comeback as a player – travelling as the selector of an injury depleted Auckland team, he turned out against Marlborough at Blenheim in 1909; Marlborough won 8–3. He also played against the Maniapoto sub-union just over a week later. Auckland held the Ranfurly Shield from 1905 to 1913, successfully defending it 23 times. The team struggled to retain the shield during 1912 and 1913 and eventually lost it to Taranaki in a 14–11 defeat. During Gallaher's tenure as selector Auckland inflicted an 11–0 defeat of the touring 1908 Anglo-Welsh side, defeated the New Zealand Māori in 1910, and beat Australia 15–11 in 1913.

Gallaher was also a national selector from 1907 to 1914, (Note: Unlike with Auckland where he was sole selector, New Zealand had three other selectors alongside Gallaher.) and with George Nicholson co-coached the All Blacks against the 1908 Anglo-Welsh team. A number of Gallaher's team-mates from the 1905–06 tour were included in the New Zealand squad for the series; of three Tests, the All Blacks won two and drew the other. During Gallaher's incumbency as a national selector, New Zealand played 50 matches, won 44, lost four and drew two. This included 16 Tests, of which only one was lost and two drawn.

== First World War ==
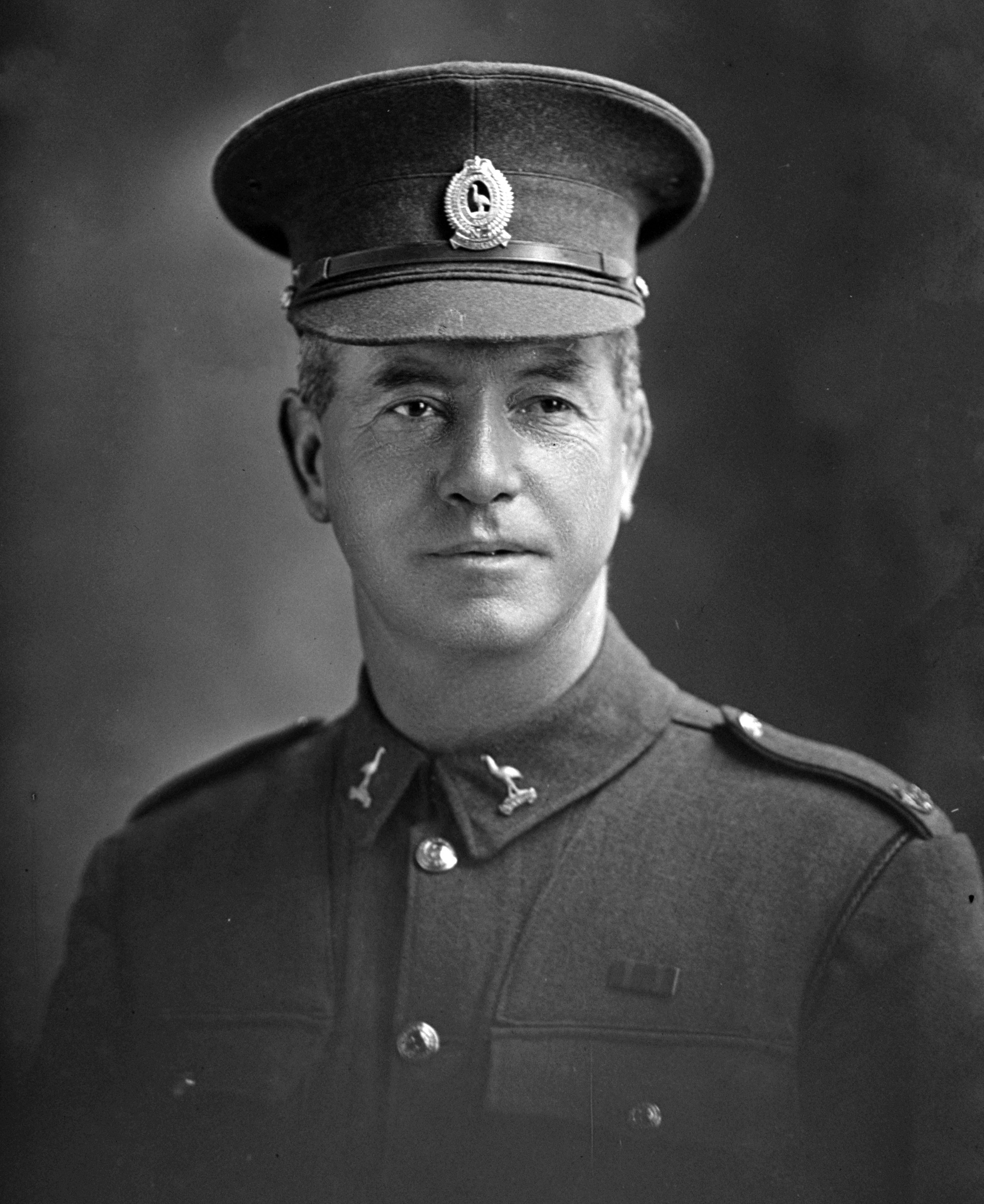
Dave Gallaher in uniform, c. 1917

Although exempt from conscription due to his age, Gallaher enlisted in May 1916. While awaiting for his call-up to begin training he learnt that his younger brother Company Sergeant-Major Douglas Wallace Gallaher had been killed while serving with the 11th Australian Battalion at Laventie near Fromelles on 3 June 1916. Douglas had been living in Perth, Australia prior to the war and had previously been wounded at Gallipoli. Biographer Matt Elliott describes it as a "myth" that Gallaher enlisted to avenge his younger brother; rather he claims that it was most likely due to "loyalty and duty".

After enlisting and completing his basic training at Trentham he was posted to 22nd Reinforcements, 2nd Battalion, Auckland Regiment within the New Zealand Division. Gallaher left New Zealand aboard the Aparima in February 1917 and reached Britain on 2 May. Gallaher was a member of the ship's Sports Committee and spent time organising and practising for a planned rugby match at the Cape of Good Hope – it is unknown if the match ever took place. After arriving in England he was promoted to the rank of temporary sergeant and dispatched to Sling Camp for further training. His rank was confirmed as sergeant on 6 June 1917.

Gallaher's unit fought in the Battle of Messines, near La Basse Ville, and in August and September 1917 they trained for the upcoming Passchendaele offensive. During the Battle of Broodseinde on 4 October 1917 Gallaher was fatally wounded by a piece of shrapnel that penetrated through his helmet, and he died later that day at the 3rd Australian Casualty Clearing Station, Gravenstafel Spur. He was 43 years old.

Dave Gallaher is buried in grave No. 32513 at Nine Elms British Cemetery, which is west of Poperinge on the Helleketelweg, a road leading from the R33 Poperinge ring road in Belgium. His regulation gravestone, bearing the silver fern of New Zealand, incorrectly gives his age as 41. New Zealand sides touring Europe have since regularly visited his grave site. For his war service Gallaher was posthumously awarded the British War Medal and the Victory Medal. His brother Henry, who was a miner, served with the Australian 51st Battalion and was killed on 24 April 1918. Henry's twin brother, Charles, also served in the war and survived being badly wounded at Gallipoli.

== Personal life ==
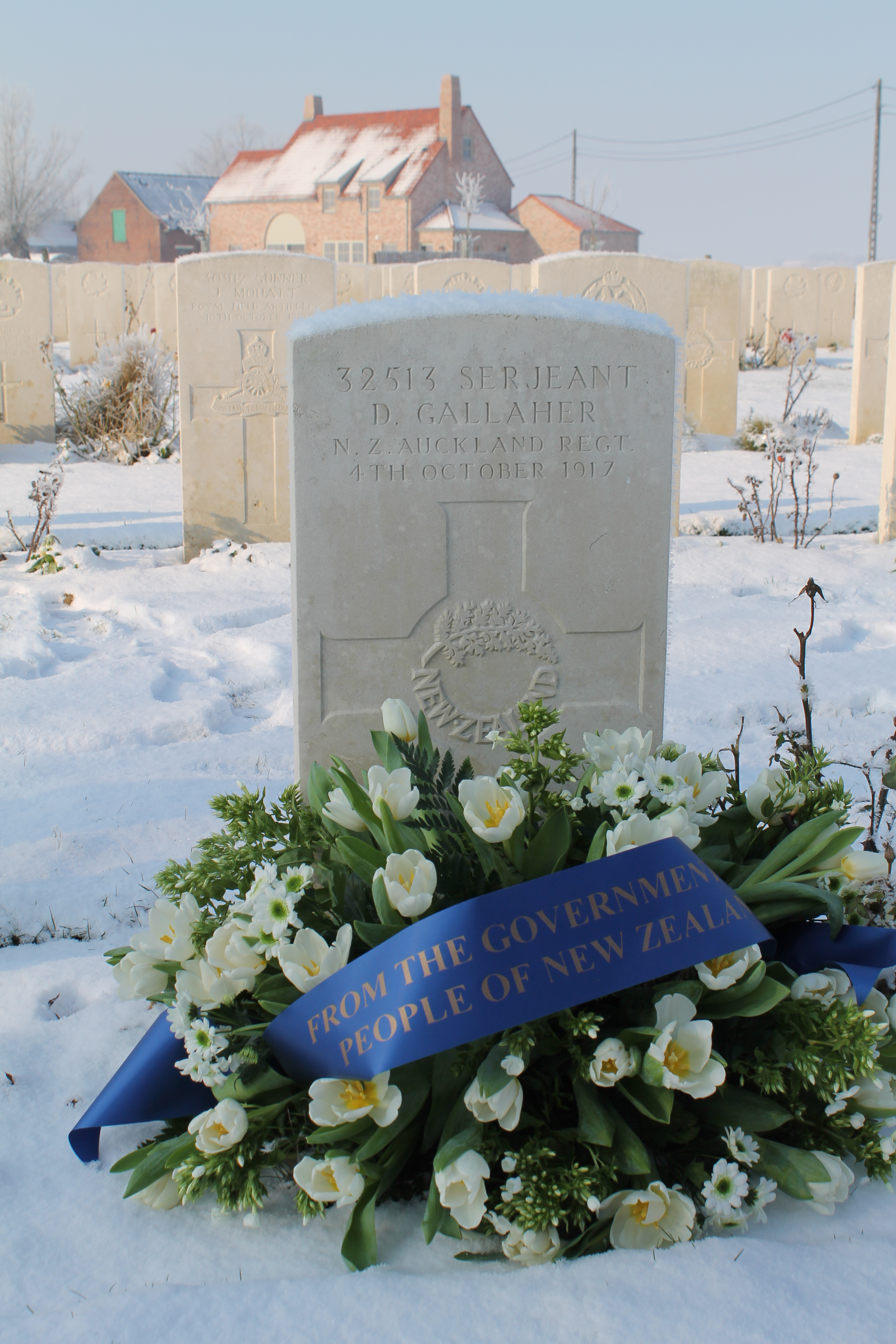
Gallaher's grave at Nine Elms British Cemetery, Belgium

On 10 October 1906 Gallaher married "Nellie" Ellen Ivy May Francis at All Saints Anglican Church, Ponsonby, Auckland. Eleven years younger than Gallaher, Nellie was the daughter of Nora Francis and the sister of Arthur ('Bolla') Francis – a fellow rugby player. For many years prior to the marriage Gallaher had boarded at the Francis family home where he had come to know Nellie. Both had also attended the All Saints Anglican Church where Nellie sang in the choir. With his limited income, and frequent absences from work playing rugby, Gallaher found boarding his best accommodation option. On 28 September 1908 their daughter Nora Tahatu (later Nora Simpson) was born. Nellie Gallaher died in January 1969.

Gallaher's brother-in-law Bolla Francis played for Ponsonby, Auckland and New Zealand sides for a number of years, including when Gallaher was a selector. In 1911, at age 29, and in the twilight of his All Blacks' career, he decided to switch to the professional sport of rugby league. Francis went on to represent New Zealand in rugby league, making him a dual-code international. It is unlikely his switch to rugby league was done without Gallaher's knowledge. Francis did eventually return to rugby union as a coach.

Gallaher was also a member of the fraternal organisation the United Ancient Order of the Druids, and attended meetings fortnightly in Newton, not far from Ponsonby. He also played several sports in addition to rugby, including cricket, yachting and athletics.

== Memorial and legacy ==
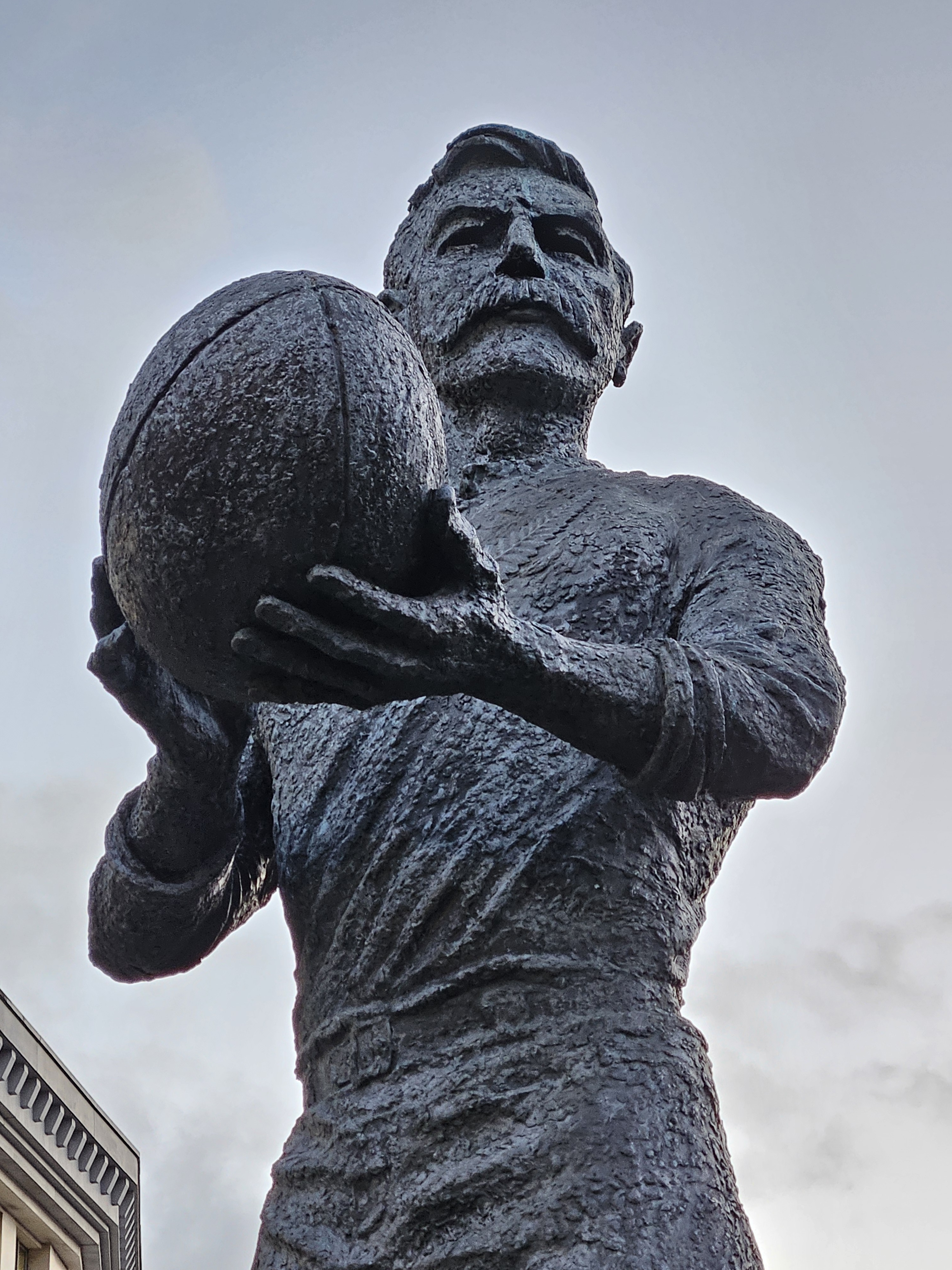
The Dave Gallaher statue at Eden Park, Auckland

In 1922 the Auckland Rugby Football Union introduced the Gallaher Shield in his honour; it has since been awarded to the winner of the union's premier men's club competition. Ponsonby – Gallaher's old club – have won the title more than any other club. At international level New Zealand and France contest the Dave Gallaher Trophy, which was first awarded when New Zealand defeated France on Armistice Day in 2000. In 2011 New Zealand's then oldest living All Black, Sir Fred Allen, unveiled a 2.7-metre (8 ft 10 in) high bronze statue of Gallaher beside one of the entrances at Eden Park in Auckland. The statue was created by Malcolm Evans. Gallaher has been inducted into the International Rugby Hall of Fame, the World Rugby Hall of Fame, and the New Zealand Sports Hall of Fame. (Note: The collective 1905 All Blacks are also an inductee into the New Zealand Sports Hall of Fame.)

In 2005 members of the All Blacks witnessed the unveiling of a plaque at Gallaher's birthplace in Ramelton, which was presented in conjunction with the renaming of Letterkenny RFC's home ground to Dave Gallaher Memorial Park. Gallaher's name is also incorporated into the club's crest. The ground was upgraded following its renaming, and in 2012 the Letterkenny section of the ground was opened by former All Black, and Ponsonby stalwart, Bryan Williams. An Ireland-produced documentary about Gallaher's life, The Donegal All Black, was aired in 2015. Later that year, a jersey worn by Gallaher during the 1905 British Isles tour was sold at auction in Cardiff for £180,000—nearly 10 times the previous record auction price for a rugby jersey.

== Leadership and personality ==
"Gallaher played many dashing games," the British newspaper The Sportsman reported after his death, "and led his side from one success to another until they were deemed invincible. He was a veritable artist, who never deserved all the hard things said about him, especially in South Wales. A great player, a great judge of the game". Gallaher's military experience gave him an appreciation for "discipline, cohesion and steadiness under pressure." He was however quiet, even dour, and preferred to lead by example. He insisted players spend an hour "contemplating the game ahead" on match days, and also that they pay attention to detail. Original All Black Ernie Booth wrote of Gallaher: "To us All Blacks his words would often be, 'Give nothing away; take no chance.' As a skipper he was somewhat a disciplinarian, doubtless imbibed from his previous military experience in South Africa. Still, he treated us all like men, not kids, who were out to 'play the game' for good old New Zealand." Another contemporary said he was "perhaps not the greatest of wing-forwards, as such; but he was acutely skilled as a judge of men and moves".

Paul Verdon, in his history of All Black captains, Born to Lead, writes: "The overwhelming evidence suggests Gallaher's leadership style, honed from time spent in the Boer War, was very effective." Gallaher's biographer Matt Elliott asserts that in the century since his playing retirement "his reputation as a player and leader have only enhanced". According to historian Terry McLean: "In a long experience of reading and hearing about the man, one has never encountered, from the New Zealand angle, or from his fellow players, criticism of his qualities as a leader." In the view of the English rugby journalist E. H. D. Sewell, writing soon after Gallaher's death, the New Zealand captain was "a very quiet, taciturn sort of cove, who spoke rarely about football or his own achievements ... I never heard a soul who met him on that famous trip, say a disparaging word about him."

== See also ==
- List of international rugby union players killed in World War I

== Footnotes ==
Notes

== Sources ==
Books and articles

- Carter, A. Kay (2011). Maria Gallaher – Her Short Life and Her Children's Stories. Paraparaumu: Champion Associates. ISBN 9780987653802.
- Elliott, Matt (2012). Dave Gallaher – The Original All Black Captain (paperback). London: Harper Collins. ISBN 978-1-86950-968-2.
- Gabe, Rhys T. (1954). "The 1905–06 Tour". In Wooller, Wilfred; Owen, David (eds.). Fifty Years of the All Blacks: A Complete History of New Zealand Rugby Touring Teams in the British Isles. London: Phoenix House Ltd.
- King, Michael (2003). The Penguin History of New Zealand. New Zealand: Penguin Books. ISBN 978-0-14-301867-4.
- McCarthy, Winston (1968). Haka! The All Blacks Story. London: Pelham Books.
- McLean, Terry (1959). Great Days in New Zealand Rugby. Wellington, New Zealand: A. H. & A. W. Reed.
- McLean, Terry (1987). New Zealand Rugby Legends. Auckland, New Zealand: MOA Publications. ISBN 0-908570-15-5.
- Ryan, Greg (1993). Forerunners of the All Blacks. Christchurch, New Zealand: Canterbury University Press. ISBN 0-908812-30-2.
- Ryan, Greg (2005). The Contest for Rugby Supremacy – Accounting for the 1905 All Blacks. Canterbury University Press. ISBN 1-877257-36-2.
- Ryan, Greg (2011). "A Tale of Two Dinners: New Zealand Rugby and the Embrace of Empire, 1919–32". The International Journal of the History of Sport. 28 (10). Routledge: 1409–1425. doi:10.1080/09523367.2011.577641. S2CID 144270919.
- Swan, Arthur C.; Jackson, Gordon F. W. (1952). Wellington's Rugby History 1870 – 1950. Wellington, New Zealand: A. H. & A. W. Reed.
- Tobin, Christopher (2005). The Original All Blacks 1905–06. Auckland, New Zealand: Hodder Moa Beckett. ISBN 1-86958-995-5.
- Verdon, Paul (2000). Born to Lead – The Untold Story of the All Black Test Captains. Auckland, New Zealand: Celebrity Books. ISBN 1-877252-05-0.
- Vincent, V. T. (1998). "Practical Imperialism: The Anglo-Welsh Rugby Tour of New Zealand, 1908". The International Journal of the History of Sport. 15 (1). Routledge: 123–140. doi:10.1080/09523369808714015.
- Williams, Peter (2002). "Battle Lines on Three Fronts: The RFU and the Lost War Against Professionalism". The International Journal of the History of Sport. 19 (4). Routledge: 114–136. doi:10.1080/714001793. S2CID 145705183.

News

- "All Blacks legend to unveil plaque at Dave Gallagher Park in Letterkenny". Donegal Democrat. 1 November 2012. Archived from the original on 9 August 2014.
- "Batting the Lions: Evolution of the replacement laws". The New Zealand Herald. 3 May 2005.
- "Dave Gallaher 1905 All Blacks jersey sells for £180,000". bbc.com. 8 October 2015.
- "David Gallaher's Death". Evening Post. 16 January 1918. p. 8.
- Gallagher, Brendan (3 November 2000). "Hero Gallaher remembered". The Telegraph.
- "Gallaher statue unveiled at Eden Park". sportal.co.nz. 15 July 2011. Archived from the original on 12 October 2014.
- Horrell, Rhiannon (15 July 2011). "Eden Park unveils statue of legend". stuff.co.nz.
- Jenkins, Graham (25 September 2011). "Rucking all over the world". ESPN.
- "Setanta to air Dave Gallaher documentary featuring Letterkenny Rugby Club and Ramelton next week". Donegal Democrat. 5 February 2015. Archived from the original on 6 February 2015.
- Walsh, Harry (3 November 2012). "All Black legend visits Letterkenny". Derry People Donegal News. Archived from the original on 9 August 2014.

Web

- "4th All Black Test". allblacks.com. NZRU.
- "6th All Black Test". allblacks.com. NZRU.
- "8th All Black Test". allblacks.com. NZRU.
- "56th All Black Game". allblacks.com. NZRU.
- "67th All Black Game". allblacks.com. NZRU.
- "2010 Inductee: Dave Gallaher". World Rugby. 15 May 2011.
- "All Blacks, 1905". New Zealand Sports Hall of Fame.
- "Dave Gallaher". allblacks.com. NZRU.
- "Dave Gallaher". New Zealand Sports Hall of Fame.
- "Dave Gallaher". The International Rugby Hall of Fame. Archived from the original on 12 May 2013.
- "in New South Wales and Queensland". allblacks.com. NZRU.
- "in the British Isles, France and North America". allblacks.com. NZRU.
- McLean, Denis (25 September 2013). "Gallaher, David". Dictionary of New Zealand Biography. Te Ara – the Encyclopedia of New Zealand. Ministry for Culture and Heritage.
- "Provincial competitions". Ministry for Culture and Heritage. 30 October 2015. Archived from the original on 31 July 2016.
- "Sergeant Dave Gallaher (32513)". New Zealand Army Museum. Archived from the original on 24 June 2015.
- Swan, Arthur (1966). "Ranfurly Shield". In McLintock, A. H. (ed.). An Encyclopaedia of New Zealand. Te Ara – the Encyclopedia of New Zealand.
- "The 1905/06 'Originals'". New Zealand Rugby Museum.
