= 1903 New Zealand rugby union tour of Australia =

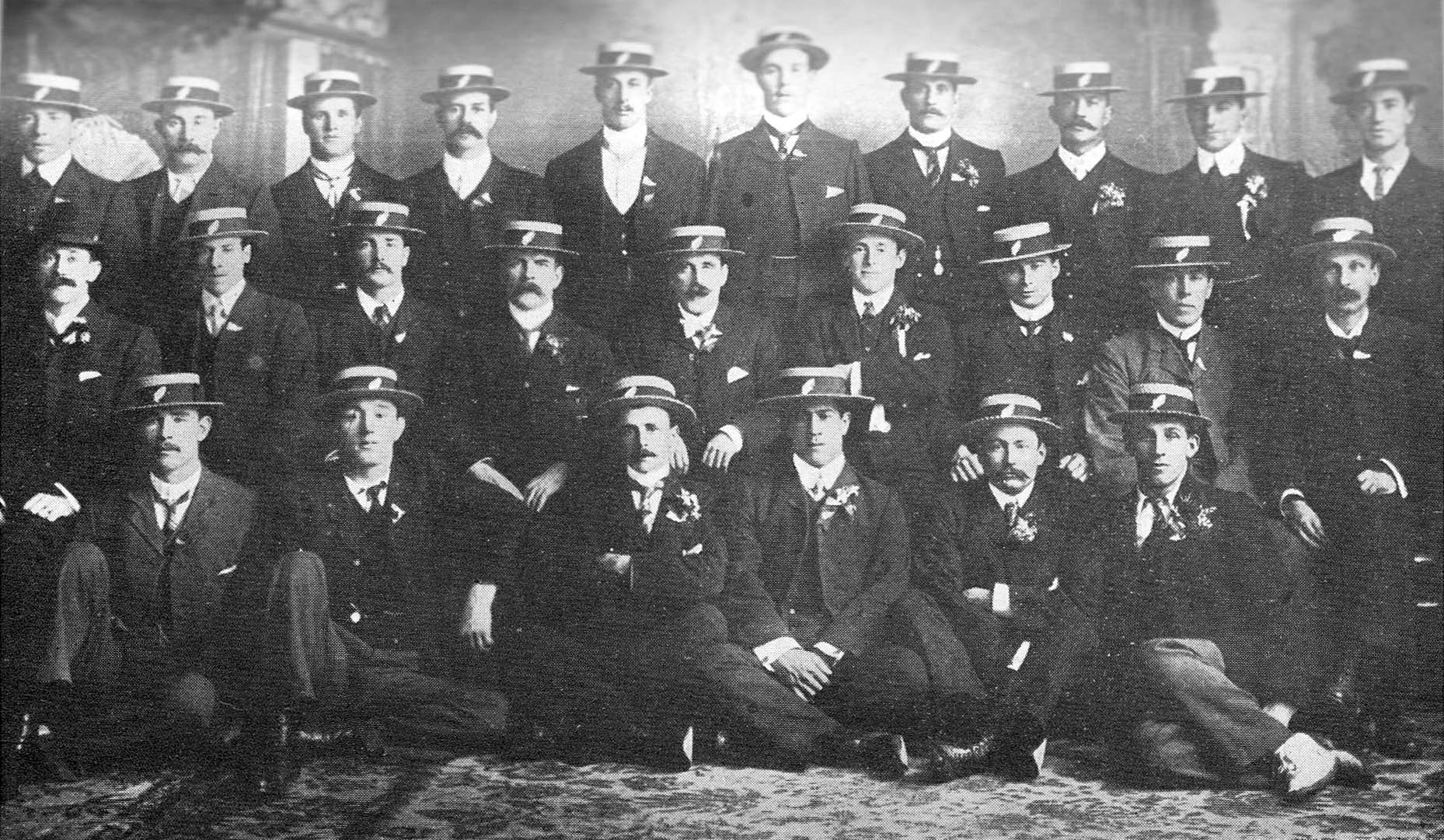
- Official photo of the touring team
- Manager: A.C. Norris
- Tour captain: Jimmy Duncan
- Top point scorer: Billy Wallace (87)
- Top try scorer: Albert Asher (17)
Summary
P	W	D	L
Total
11	10	0	1
Opponent
P	W	D	L
Australia
1	1	0	0

Tour chronology
- ← 1897 Australia 1905 Australia →

The 1903 New Zealand tour rugby to Australia, also known as the first Trans-Tasman test, was the fourth tour by the New Zealand national team to Australia, and marked the first international test match played between the two national teams.

A warm-up match was played against Wellington before nine matches were played against Australian regional and district sides along with one test match between the two national sides.

== Touring party ==
- Manager: A.C. Norris
- Captain: Jimmy Duncan

Name	Position	Age	Province
Billy Wallace	Back	2 August 1878 (aged 24)	Wellington
Albert Asher	Wing	3 December 1879 (aged 23)	Auckland
Duncan McGregor	Wing	16 July 1881 (aged 22)	Canterbury
Dick McGregor	Centre	3 December 1874 (aged 28)	Auckland
John Stalker	Centre	11 February 1881 (aged 22)	Otago
John (Billy) Stead	Five-eighth	18 September 1877 (aged 25)	Southland
Jimmy Duncan	Five-eighth	12 November 1869 (aged 33)	Otago
Morrie Wood	Five-eighth	9 October 1876 (aged 26)	Canterbury
Arthur Humphries	Half-back	15 February 1874 (aged 29)	Taranaki
Henry Kiernan	Half-back	24 July 1876 (aged 26)	Auckland
Loftus Armstrong	Wing forward	13 April 1878 (aged 25)	Wairarapa
Reuben Cooke	Loose forward	17 April 1876 (aged 27)	Canterbury
Bernard Fanning	Lock	11 November 1874 (aged 28)	Canterbury
Dave Gallaher	Hooker	30 October 1873 (aged 29)	Auckland
Fred Given	Flanker	21 May 1876 (aged 27)	Otago
Paddy Long	Forward	13 November 1879 (aged 23)	Auckland
Archie McMinn	Loose forward	14 August 1880 (aged 22)	Wairarapa
George Nicholson	Loose forward	3 August 1878 (aged 24)	Auckland
Harry Porteous	Forward	20 January 1875 (aged 28)	Otago
Jack Spencer	Loose forward	27 May 1880 (aged 23)	Wellington
George Tyler	Hooker	10 February 1879 (aged 24)	Auckland
Dan Udy	Hooker	21 May 1874 (aged 29)	Wairarapa

== Match summary ==
Complete list of matches played by New Zealand in Australia:

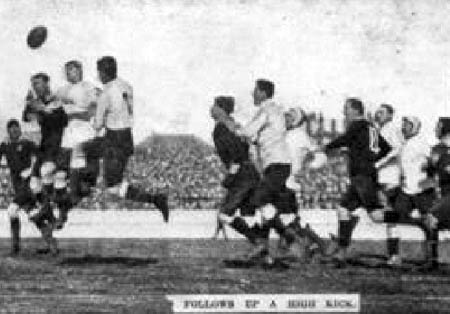
Scene of the New Zealand test v. Australia, 15 August

Date	Home team	Score	Away team	Venue
1 July	Wellington	14–5	New Zealand	Athletic Park, Wellington
18 July	New South Wales	0–12	New Zealand	Sydney Cricket Ground, Sydney, New South Wales
22 July	Combined Western District	7–47	New Zealand	Bathurst, New South Wales
25 July	New South Wales	0–3	New Zealand	Sydney Cricket Ground, Sydney, New South Wales
29 July	Metropolitan Union	3–33	New Zealand	University Oval, Sydney, New South Wales
1 August	Queensland	0–17	New Zealand	Brisbane Exhibition Ground, Brisbane, Queensland
5 August	Western Queensland	0–29	New Zealand	Brisbane Exhibition Ground, Brisbane, Queensland
8 August	Queensland	0–28	New Zealand	Brisbane Exhibition Ground, Brisbane, Queensland
11 August	Combined Northern Districts	0–53	New Zealand	Albion Cricket Ground, Maitland, New South Wales
15 August	Australia	3–22	New Zealand	Sydney Cricket Ground, Sydney, New South Wales
19 August	New South Wales Country	0–32	New Zealand	Sydney Cricket Ground, Sydney, New South Wales

Balance
Pl	W	D	L	Ps	Pc
11	10	0	1	281	27

== Test match ==
15 August 1903

Australia	3–22	New Zealand
Pen: Wickham	Report	Try: Asher, RW McGregor, Tyle; Con: Wallace; Pen: Wallace; Goal from mark: Wallace 2

Cricket Ground, Sydney
Attendance: 30,000
Referee: R Waugh (Australia)

Team details

Australia	New Zealand

John Maund	FB	FB	Billy Wallace
Charlie Redwood	W	W	Albert Asher
Sid Riley	C	C	Dick McGregor
Stan Wickham (capt.)	C	C	Morrie Wood
Charlie White	W	W	Duncan McGregor
Lew Evans	FH	FH	Jimmy Duncan (capt.)
Austin Gralton	SH	SH	Henry Kiernan
Sine Boland	N8	F	Archie McMinn
Harold Judd	F	F	George Nicholson
Bill Hardcastle	F	L	Paddy Long
Dinny Lutge	L	L	Bernard Fanning
James Joyce	L	L	Reuben Cooke
Frank Nicholson	H	P	Dan Udy
Ted Larkin	H	H	George Tyler
Alec Burdon	P	WF	Dave Gallaher

== See also ==
- List of All Blacks tours and series

== Sources ==
- Jenkins, Peter; Alvarez, Matthew (1999). Wallaby Gold: 100 Years of Australian Test Rugby. Random House. ISBN 0-091-83726-X.
