= Henry Kiernan =

- Born: Henry Arthur Douglas Kiernan; 24 July 1876 Whanganui, New Zealand
- Died: 15 January 1947 (aged 70) Ōtāhuhu, New Zealand

Rugby union career
- Position: Half-back
Amateur team(s)
Years	Team	Apps	(Points)
- Grafton
Provincial / State sides
Years	Team	Apps	(Points)
1894–99	Wanganui		
1900–08	Auckland	28	
-	North Island		
International career
Years	Team	Apps	(Points)
1903	New Zealand	1	(0)

Henry Kiernan, also known as Mickey (24 July 1876 – 15 January 1947) was a rugby union player who played for New Zealand internationally, including in the side's first ever Test match in 1903. Playing at half-back he represented Wanganui from 1894 till 1899, when he moved to Auckland in 1900. There he continued playing provincial rugby for his new province until 1908.

He was selected for New Zealand's 1903 tour of Australia. The 1903 New Zealand team was, according to Winston McCarthy's 1968 history of the All Blacks, "still regarded by old-timers as the greatest team to ever leave New Zealand". The party was captained by the veteran Otago player Jimmy Duncan, who was widely recognised as a master tactician. Since the selection of the first New Zealand team in 1884, inter-colonial games had been played against New South Wales (ten New Zealand wins from thirteen matches), and Queensland (seven New Zealand wins from seven), but none had been contested against a combined Australian side. However, on this tour New Zealand faced a combined Australian side for the first time—which was also New Zealand's first ever Test match. The match was won 22–3 by the New Zealanders, who scored three tries to nil, with Kiernan playing at half-back.

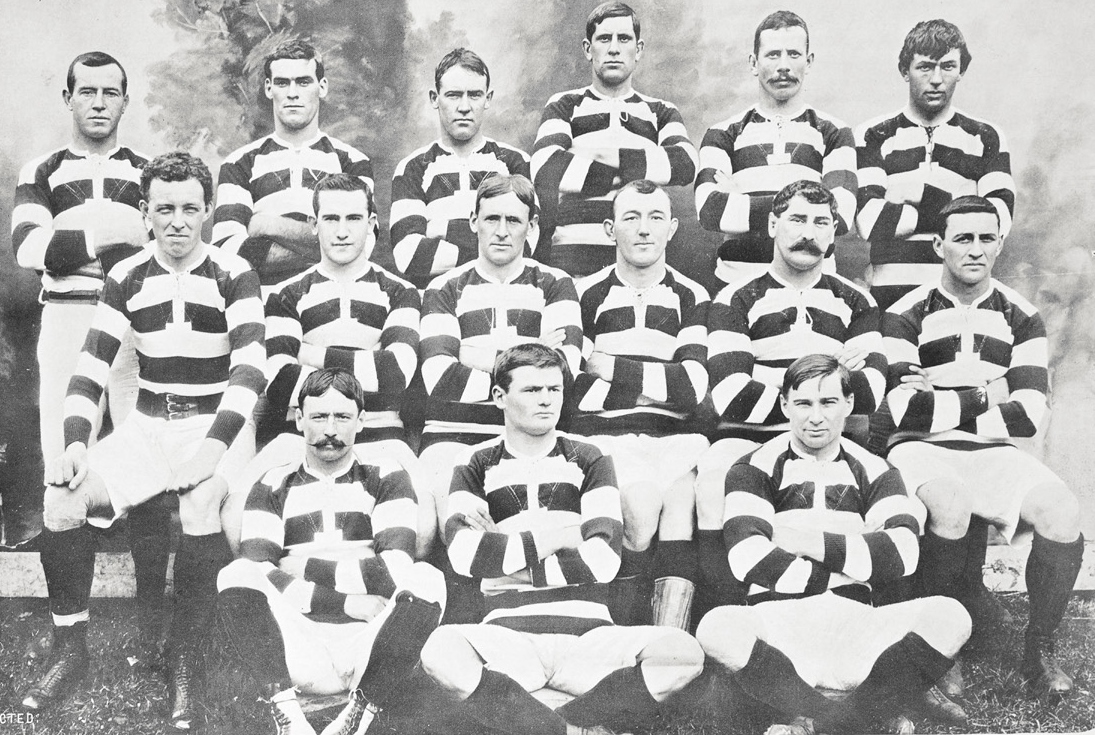
Kiernan and the other Auckland players that defeated the touring 1904 British Isles team. Kiernan seated in the front row on the left.

Kiernan played a total of nine matches including the Test match, on the tour. He did not play international rugby again, but continued playing provincial rugby for Auckland, as well as playing for the North Island in a number of inter-island matches. He played in the Auckland side the comfortably defeated the touring British Isles side in 1904, and also played in the first ever Ranfurly Shield match—contested against Wellington.

== Sources ==
- Elliott, Matt (2012). Dave Gallaher – The Original All Black Captain (paperback). London: Harper Collins. ISBN 978-1-86950-968-2.
- Knight, Lindsey. "Mickey Kiernan". New Zealand Rugby.
- McCarthy, Winston (1968). Haka! The All Blacks Story. London: Pelham Books.
- Verdon, Paul (2000). Born to Lead – The Untold Story of the All Black Test Captains. Auckland, New Zealand: Celebrity Books. ISBN 1-877252-05-0.
