= George Tyler (rugby union) =

NZ international rugby union player (1879-1942)

George 'Bubs' Tyler
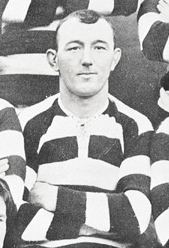
- Born: George Alfred Tyler; 10 February 1879 Auckland, New Zealand
- Died: 15 April 1942 (aged 63) Auckland, New Zealand
- Height: 1.78 m (5 ft 10 in)
- Weight: 82 kg (12.9 st)
- Occupation: Boat-builder

Rugby union career
- Position: Hooker
Amateur team(s)
Years	Team	Apps	(Points)
- City (Auckland)
Provincial / State sides
Years	Team	Apps	(Points)
1899–1911	Auckland		
1903	North Island		
International career
Years	Team	Apps	(Points)
1903–06	New Zealand	36	(27)
- Relatives: William Tyler (brother)

George Alfred Tyler (10 February 1879 – 15 April 1942) was a New Zealand rugby union player who represented New Zealand – the All Blacks – between 1903 and 1906. He played in New Zealand's first seven Test matches, including all five Tests on the pioneering Original All Blacks 1905–06 tour of the British Isles and France. He played club rugby for City in Auckland, and was selected for his province between 1899 and 1911. His brother Bill Tyler also played rugby for City and Auckland before switching codes and representing New Zealand at rugby league.

== Biography ==
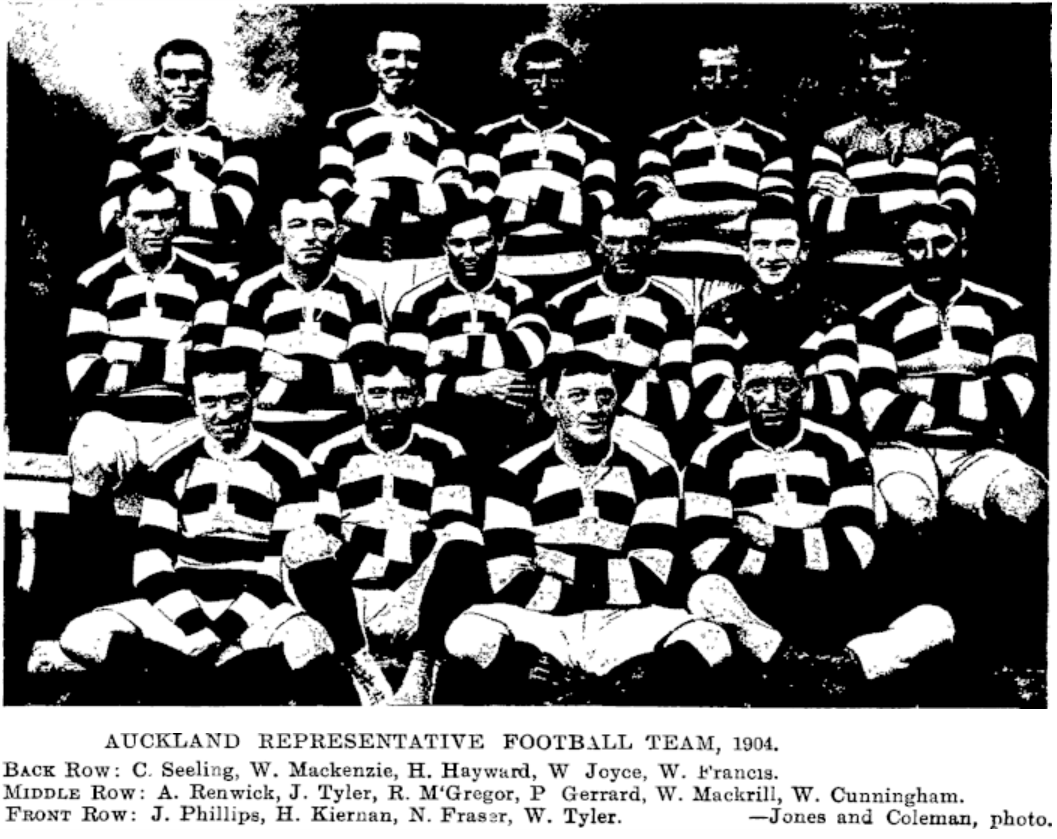

Playing at hooker, Tyler played for the City club in Auckland, and with them won seven senior Auckland championships between 1900 and 1911. From there he was selected for Auckland starting in 1899, and continued to represent his province until 1911. Tyler was first selected for New Zealand for their 1903 tour of Australia. Tyler played in all eleven of the sides matches, including the game against Wellington immediately before their departure. The team won all ten of their Australian matches, including winning their first ever Test match – against Australia in Sydney. Tyler was one of only four players, and only two forwards, that played all ten matches.

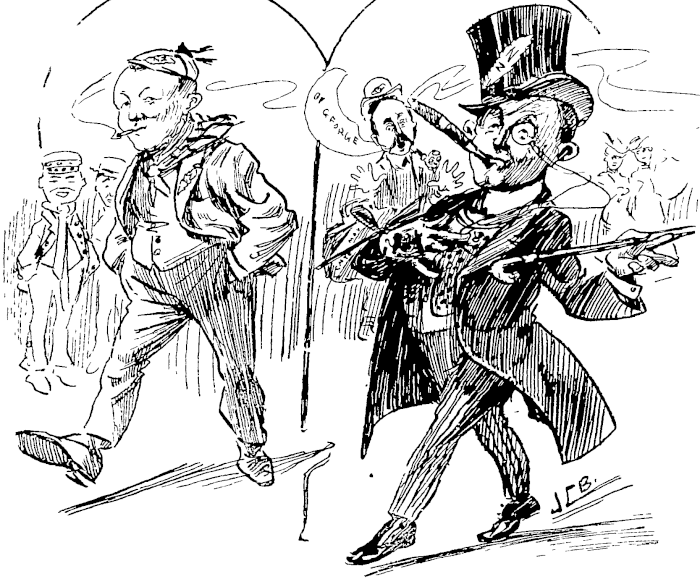
Cartoon by John Collis Blomfield published in the New Zealand Free Lance depicting Tyler before and after shaking the hand of King Edward VII.

The following year Tyler played for Auckland in the first ever Ranfurly Shield match – which Auckland lost to Wellington. He then played for New Zealand in their first ever home Test match – against the British Isles. The British side were touring New Zealand and Australia, and had gone through their Australian-leg unbeaten before facing New Zealand in Wellington. The New Zealanders won 9–3 to inflict the first defeat on the British. A week later Tyler was in the Auckland team that faced the tourists. The result was an even more comprehensive victory, with Tyler and the other forwards dominating their opponents.

He was selected for the historic tour to the British Isles and France in 1905. The side played five Tests – against Scotland, Ireland, England, the famous Match of the Century against Wales and France – with Tyler appearing in all of them. The only loss of the 35 match tour matches was the Welsh Test match, a narrow and controversial 3–0 loss. Tyler appeared in 23 of the tour matches, but is most notably remembered for shaking the hands with King Edward VII. Eight of the All Blacks met King Edward VII while visiting a cattle show in Islington, with the monarch shaking Tyler's hand and congratulating him on the team's success. He was selected for the All Blacks again in 1907, but declined to play because of work commitments. He continued to play rugby for Auckland until 1911, and was also involved in swimming, rowing and yachting.

Tyler died at his home in Auckland on 15 April 1942, and was buried at Waikaraka Cemetery.

== Bibliography ==
- McCarthy, Winston (1968). Haka! The All Blacks Story. London: Pelham Books.
- Elliott, Matt (2012). Dave Gallaher – The Original All Black Captain (paperback). London: Harper Collins. ISBN 978-1-86950-968-2.
