= George Nicholson (rugby union) =

New Zealand rugby player (1878–1968)

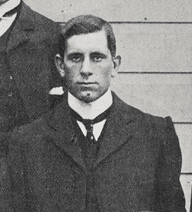
- Born: George William Nicholson; 3 August 1878 Auckland, New Zealand
- Died: 13 September 1968 (aged 90) Auckland, New Zealand
- Height: 1.91 m (6 ft 3 in)
- Weight: 87 kg (13.7 st)
- School: Newton East School
- Occupation: Bootmaker

Rugby union career
- Position: Flanker
Amateur team(s)
Years	Team	Apps	(Points)
??–1906	City		
1907–??	Ponsonby		
Provincial / State sides
Years	Team	Apps	(Points)
1901–09	Auckland		
1902	North Island		
International career
Years	Team	Apps	(Points)
1903–07	New Zealand	39	(24)

George Nicholson (3 August 1878 – 13 September 1968) was a New Zealand rugby union footballer who played for New Zealand – the All Blacks – between 1903 and 1907. He played club rugby in Auckland for the City club, before making his provincial debut for Auckland in 1901. After playing for the North Island in 1902, he was selected for New Zealand's tour of Australia in 1903 where he played in the All Blacks' first ever Test match – against Australia in Sydney. The following year he was selected for New Zealand when they played a one-off Test against the British Isles who were touring New Zealand; New Zealand's first home international. In 1905 and 1906 he was selected for the All Blacks tour of Europe and North America. This was the first New Zealand national team to tour the Northern Hemisphere, and played 20 matches during the trip, but did not appear in any internationals. After returning to New Zealand he switched clubs to Ponsonby in 1907, and that year played two Tests for New Zealand against Australia – his last matches representing his country. After retiring from rugby he was involved in the sport as a referee, selector and administrator. He was one of the last surviving members of the Original All Blacks, as the 1905 team was called, and was present at the 75th jubilee celebrating for the formation of the New Zealand Rugby Football Union in 1967.

== Rugby career ==
George William Nicholson was born in Auckland on 3 August 1878. After being educated at Newton East School, Nicholson played club rugby for the City club in Auckland's competition. He was selected for Auckland in 1901, and in 1902 played for the North Island in the inter-island match; lost 20–14 to the South. The following year he was selected for the tour of Australia. During the tour one Test match was played against Australia – New Zealand's first ever – and Nicholson was selected for the side.

== Sources ==
- Luxford, Bob. "George Nicholson". New Zealand Rugby Museum.
- "George Nicholson, New Zealand". ESPN.
- McCarthy, Winston (1968). Haka! The All Blacks Story. London: Pelham Books.
- "The 1905/06 'Originals'". New Zealand Rugby Museum.
- Elliott, Matt (2012). Dave Gallaher – The Original All Black Captain (paperback). London: Harper Collins. ISBN 978-1-86950-968-2.
