= John Stalker (disambiguation) =

John Stalker (1939–2019) was a British police officer, author and television personality.

John Stalker may also refer to:

- John Stalker (rugby union) (1881–1931), New Zealand rugby union player
- John Stalker (footballer) (born 1959), Scottish footballer
