= Harry Porteous =

NZ international rugby union player

- Born: Harry Graeme Porteous; 20 January 1875 Waitati, New Zealand
- Died: 19 December 1951 (aged 76) Wellington, New Zealand
- Height: 1.77 m (5 ft 9 1/2 in)
- Weight: 79 kg (174 lb)

Rugby union career
- Position: Wing forward
Provincial / State sides
Years	Team	Apps	(Points)
1900–06	Otago	30	
International career
Years	Team	Apps	(Points)
1903	New Zealand	0	(0)

Harry Graeme Porteous (20 January 1875 – 19 December 1951) was a New Zealand rugby union player. A wing forward, Porteous represented Otago at a provincial level. He was a member of the New Zealand national side for the 1903 tour of Australia, playing in three matches, but he did not appear in any internationals.

Porteous died in Wellington on 19 December 1951, and his ashes were buried at Karori Cemetery.
