= Fred Given =

- Full name: Frederick James Given
- Born: 21 May 1876 Oamaru, New Zealand
- Died: 12 June 1921 (aged 45) Hawera, New Zealand
- Height: 183 cm (6 ft 0 in)
- Weight: 86 kg (190 lb)

Rugby union career
- Position: Flanker
Provincial / State sides
Years	Team	Apps	(Points)
1895–05	Otago	34	
International career
Years	Team	Apps	(Points)
1903	New Zealand		

Frederick James Given (21 May 1876 – 12 June 1921) was a New Zealand international rugby union player.

Born in Oamaru, Given was a sizeable forward who was a considerable asset in line–outs and played his rugby in Dunedin for Alhambra. He made the first of his 34 provincial appearances for Otago in 1895 and represented New Zealand on their 1903 tour of Australia, where he played eight uncapped matches. He continued with Otago up until his retirement in 1905 and afterwards remained involved in rugby as a club coach.

Given, a plumbing inspector, was employed by the Dunedin Drainage Board and later Hawera Borough Council. He was married with two children and died of pneumonia in 1921 aged 45.

== See also ==
- List of New Zealand national rugby union players
