= Paddy Long =

- Full name: Andrew Thomas Long
- Born: 13 November 1879 Auckland, New Zealand
- Died: 2 October 1960 (aged 80) Auckland, New Zealand

Rugby union career
- Position: Forward
Provincial / State sides
Years	Team	Apps	(Points)
- Auckland
International career
Years	Team	Apps	(Points)
1903	New Zealand	1	(0)

Andrew Thomas "Paddy" Long (13 November 1879 — 2 October 1960) was a New Zealand international rugby union player.

A forward, Long played his early rugby at St Benedict's and was competing with Newton when he made his Auckland representative debut in 1902. He was in the New Zealand side for the 1903 tour of Australia and made the XV for the one-off Test in Sydney, which was the first ever played between the two countries. By the end of the tour, Long had featured in all but one match and his four tries was the most by a New Zealand forward.

Long was banned for ten-years by Auckland Rugby Union in 1904 after being found guilty of involvement in a match fixing scandal, where one of his club opponents had taken money from a bookmaker to underperform. He unsuccessfully appealed the decision, before the ban was lifted in 1911, although he doesn't appear to have played again.

== See also ==
- List of New Zealand national rugby union players
