= Bernard Fanning (rugby union) =

New Zealand rugby player (1874–1946)

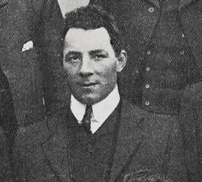
- Full name: Bernard John Fanning
- Born: 11 November 1874 Christchurch, New Zealand
- Died: 9 July 1946 (aged 71) Christchurch, New Zealand
- Height: 1.83 m (6 ft 0 in)
- Weight: 90 kg (198 lb)
- School: Marist Brothers, Christchurch

Rugby union career
- Position: Lock
International career
Years	Team	Apps	(Points)
1903–04	New Zealand	2	(0)

Bernard John Fanning (11 November 1874 — 9 July 1946) was a New Zealand rugby union international.

== Biography ==
Fanning, born in Christchurch, was a blacksmith by profession and spent his rugby career with local club Linwood. Other than one season at Wellington, he played his provincial rugby with Canterbury, making 56 representative appearances.

A lock, Fanning toured Australia in 1903 with the All Blacks, playing a match in Sydney which is considered the first Test between the Trans-Tasman teams. He was capped a second time the following year in Wellington, against the touring Great British team, then in 1905 gained a place on the tour of Britain and France, but declared himself unavailable.

Fanning's younger brother Alfred was later capped for the All Blacks, as well as his nephew Lou Petersen.

== See also ==
- List of New Zealand national rugby union players
