= Alfred Cooke =

NZ international rugby union player

- Born: Alfred Ernest Cooke c.1870 Christchurch, New Zealand
- Died: 3 June 1900 Lake Ellesmere / Te Waihora, New Zealand
- Notable relative: Reuben Cooke (brother)
- Occupation: Auctioneer

Rugby union career
- Position: Halfback
Amateur team(s)
Years	Team	Apps	(Points)
1893—95	Merivale		
Provincial / State sides
Years	Team	Apps	(Points)
1893—95	Canterbury		
International career
Years	Team	Apps	(Points)
1894	New Zealand		

Alfred Ernest Cooke (c. 1870 – 3 June 1900) was a New Zealand rugby union player who represented the All Blacks in 1894. His position of choice was halfback. Cooke did not play in any test matches as New Zealand did not play their first until 1903.

== Career ==
Out of the Merivale club, Cooke was described as "a fine halfback, exceptionally quick at getting the ball away from the scrum and also a powerful and accurate line kicker".

Cooke had a short career, playing just three seasons for the Canterbury province.

Cooke played for Canterbury in their game against the touring New South Wales side, which was won 11-3. Based on this performance Cooke was selected for the All Blacks side to play the tourists in the unofficial "test" match just two days later. The match was lost 8-6.

This was his only appearance for the national side.

== Personal and death ==
Cooke was an auctioneer by occupation.

His younger brother, Reuben, was an All Black in 1903.

Cooke died in 1900, three years before his brother would make his All Black debut. He was shot accidentally by a friend whilst being part of a shooting expedition at Lake Ellesmere / Te Waihora.
