= Dave Gallaher Trophy =

Rugby competition between France and New Zealand

- Sport: Rugby union
- Instituted: 2000
- Number of teams: 2
- Country: France; New Zealand
- Holders: New Zealand (2026)
- Most titles: New Zealand (14 titles)

The Dave Gallaher Trophy is a rugby union perpetual trophy contested between France and New Zealand. It is named after Dave Gallaher, the 1905–06 All Black captain who was killed in Belgium during World War I.

== History ==
France played their first ever test match in 1906 against the famous "Originals" New Zealand team, on their way home after a tour of the British Isles.

Between 1906 and 1999 both teams met a total of 34 times, New Zealand winning 25 times and France 9, including two games in the Rugby World Cup with New Zealand winning the 1987 final and France taking their revenge in the semi-final 12 years later in what remains one of the most famous upsets in the sport's history.

In 2000 it was decided that a new trophy would be created to emphasize the two teams' great rivalry. The trophy would be named after Dave Gallaher, the charismatic captain of the 1906 New Zealand team, who died 11 years later during the Battle of Broodseinde in World War I.

== Challenges and defences ==
The Dave Gallaher Trophy is based on a challenge system, the holding union must defend the trophy in challenge matches, and if the other union defeats them, they become the new holder of the trophy. If both teams draw then the holder retains the trophy.

Rugby World Cup games between both teams - such as the 2003 RWC 3rd place play-off won by New Zealand or the 2007 RWC quarter final won by France and 2011 RWC final won by NZL - do not qualify as challenge matches.

France won the 2009 challenge 37–36 on aggregate score over two matches, having won the first test 27–22 and lost the second 10–14. The New Zealand team had assumed the series would be drawn if each team won one test, and were upset to discover that aggregate was taken into account, which their coaching staff had deliberately withheld from them.

New Zealand would retain the trophy for 12 years until being defeated 40–25 by France in Saint-Denis in November 2021.

During the 2025 France rugby union tour of New Zealand, New Zealand regained the Dave Gallaher Trophy on 12 July after a four year absence, clinching it and the three-match test series 2–0 with a 43–17 win at Sky Stadium, Wellington. A week later, the All Blacks would consolidate the series 3–0 after defeating France 29–19 in Hamilton, after the French led at halftime.

The trophy was on the line for the inaugural match of the Nations Championship and first test match at Te Kaha in Christchurch on 4 July 2026. New Zealand retained the Trophy with a 34–32 win.

== Matches ==
As of 4 July 2026.

Location	P	France	New Zealand	D	France points	New Zealand points
France	12	3	8	1	246	388
New Zealand	16	1	15	0	244	548
Overall	28	4	23	1	490	936

== Results ==
- ST – Mid-year rugby union internationals
- AI – End-of-year rugby union internationals

Year	Date	Venue	Home	Score	Away	Trophy winner
2000	11 November	Stade de France, Paris	France	26–39	New Zealand	New Zealand
2000	18 November	Stade Vélodrome, Marseille	France	42–33	New Zealand	New Zealand
2001	30 June	Wellington Regional Stadium, Wellington	New Zealand	37–12	France	New Zealand
2002	16 November	Stade de France, Paris	France	20–20	New Zealand	Draw
2003	28 June	Lancaster Park, Christchurch	New Zealand	31–23	France	New Zealand
2004	27 November	Stade de France, Paris	France	6–45	New Zealand	New Zealand
2006	11 November	Stade de Gerland, Lyon	France	3–47	New Zealand	New Zealand
2006	18 November	Stade de France, Paris	France	11–23	New Zealand	New Zealand
2007	2 June	Eden Park, Auckland	New Zealand	42–11	France	New Zealand
2007	9 June	Wellington Regional Stadium, Wellington	New Zealand	61–10	France	New Zealand
2009	13 June	Carisbrook, Dunedin	New Zealand	22–27	France	France
2009	20 June	Wellington Regional Stadium, Wellington	New Zealand	14–10	France	France
2009	28 November	Stade Vélodrome, Marseille	France	12–39	New Zealand	New Zealand
2013	8 June	Eden Park, Auckland	New Zealand	23–13	France	New Zealand
2013	15 June	Rugby League Park, Christchurch	New Zealand	30–0	France	New Zealand
2013	22 June	Yarrow Stadium, New Plymouth	New Zealand	24–9	France	New Zealand
2013	9 November	Stade de France, Paris	France	19–26	New Zealand	New Zealand
2016	26 November	Stade de France, Paris	France	19–24	New Zealand	New Zealand
2017	11 November	Stade de France, Paris	France	18–38	New Zealand	New Zealand
2018	9 June	Eden Park, Auckland	New Zealand	52–11	France	New Zealand
2018	16 June	Wellington Regional Stadium, Wellington	New Zealand	26–13	France	New Zealand
2018	23 June	Forsyth Barr Stadium, Dunedin	New Zealand	49–14	France	New Zealand
2021	20 November	Stade de France, Paris	France	40–25	New Zealand	France
2024	16 November	Stade de France, Paris	France	30–29	New Zealand	France
2025	5 July	Forsyth Barr Stadium, Dunedin	New Zealand	31–27	France	New Zealand
2025	12 July	Wellington Regional Stadium, Wellington	New Zealand	43–17	France	New Zealand
2025	19 July	Waikato Stadium, Hamilton	New Zealand	29–19	France	New Zealand
2026	4 July	Te Kaha, Christchurch	{{ru-rt|New Zealand	34–32	France	New Zealand

== Other trophies ==
The All Blacks compete with three other nations for the attribution of a similar kind of trophy. The Bledisloe Cup, versus Australia, being the most famous. The other two are the Freedom Cup against South Africa and the Hillary Shield against England.

As for France, they compete with Australia for the Trophée des Bicentenaires and with Italy for the Garibaldi Trophy.
