= Reuben Cooke =

NZ international rugby union player

- Born: Reuben James Cooke; 17 April 1876 Christchurch, Canterbury, New Zealand
- Died: 10 May 1940 (aged 64) Melbourne, Victoria, Australia
- Weight: 85 kg (187 lb)
- Notable relative: Alfred Cooke (brother)

Rugby union career
- Position: Loose forward
Amateur team(s)
Years	Team	Apps	(Points)
1899, 1901–03	Merivale		
1904–05	Star		
Provincial / State sides
Years	Team	Apps	(Points)
1899, 1901–03	Canterbury		
1904–05	South Canterbury		
International career
Years	Team	Apps	(Points)
1903	New Zealand	1	(0)

Reuben "Ru" James Cooke (17 April 1876 – 5 May 1940) was a New Zealand rugby union player who represented the All Blacks in 1903. His position of choice was loose forward.

== Career ==
Commonly known as "Ru", out of the Merivale club, Cooke made his debut for the Canterbury province as a 19-year-old in 1899.

After playing for the South Island against the North consecutively in 1902 and 1903, Cooke was selected for the 1903 tour of Australia. He played in the preliminary match against Wellington and then nine out of the ten tour matches in Australia. He scored one try in his All Black career, against Combined Northern Districts, but did not score any points in his only test match against Australia.

In the first game in Australia against New South Wales, Cooke was sent off the field after being involved in an altercation with opposing player Harold Judd. This had happened only once prior in All Black history, in 1893 (ironically also against NSW) to William McKenzie. Further investigation proved Cooke was not at fault and he was cleared from any punishment.

He was further chosen for the test match against Great Britain in 1904 but Cooke was unable to play because of injury.

Finally, at the end of the 1904 season he was part of a pool of players that would be selected for the famous Original All Blacks. Unfortunately he was not selected and as there were no trials it is unknown how close he was for selection.

He played for South Canterbury in 1904 and 1905.

Cooke moved to Melbourne, Australia in 1913 and was a coach as well as an administrator for the Kiwi club.

== Family ==
His older brother, Alfred, was an All Black in 1894. Unfortunately, Alfred died aged 30, three years before Cooke made his All Black debut.
