= Alfred Fanning =

- Full name: Alfred Henry Netherwood Fanning
- Born: 31 March 1890 Linwood, New Zealand
- Died: 11 March 1963 (aged 72) Christchurch, New Zealand
- Notable relative: Bernard Fanning (brother)

Rugby union career
- Position: Lock
Provincial / State sides
Years	Team	Apps	(Points)
- Canterbury
International career
Years	Team	Apps	(Points)
1913	New Zealand	1	(3)

Alfred Henry Netherwood Fanning (31 March 1890 — 11 March 1963) was a New Zealand international rugby union player.

Born and raised in Christchurch, Fanning received his education at Marist Brothers' School, versed in the game on the school's stony ground. He was the younger brother of All Black Bernard Fanning.

Fanning, a lock, was a foundation member of the Marist club and also competed with Linwood, while turning out for Canterbury in representative rugby. His only All Blacks call up came in 1913 when he came into the side for the third Test against Australia at Lancaster Park, scoring their only try in a 5–16 loss.

== See also ==
- List of New Zealand national rugby union players
