= John Maund =

Australia international rugby union player (1876–1962)

- Born: John William Maund c. 1876 Bathurst, NSW
- Died: c. 1962

Rugby union career
- Position: fullback
International career
Years	Team	Apps	(Points)
1903	Australia	1	(0)

John William Maund (c.1876 – c.1962) was a rugby union player who represented Australia.

Maund, a fullback, was born in Bathurst, NSW and claimed one international rugby cap for Australia. His debut game was against New Zealand, at Sydney, on 15 August 1903.
