= Morrie Wood =

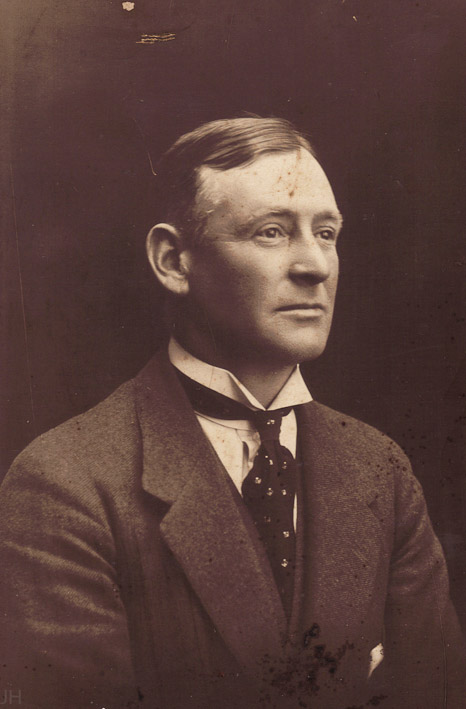
- Born: Morris Edwin Wood; 9 October 1876 Waipawa, New Zealand
- Died: 9 August 1956 (aged 79) Paraparaumu Beach, New Zealand
- Weight: 79 kg (174 lb)

Rugby union career
- Position: Second five-eighth
Provincial / State sides
| Years | Team | Apps | (Points) |
| 1894–97 | Bush | | |
| 1898–99 | Hawke's Bay | | |
| 1900–01 | Wellington | | |
| 1902–03 | Canterbury | | |
| 1904 | Auckland | 1 | |
International career
| Years | Team | Apps | (Points) |
| 1901–04 | New Zealand | 2 | (0) |

Morris Edwin Wood (9 October 1876 – 9 August 1956) was a New Zealand rugby union player and athletics champion. As second five-eighth, Wood represented the provinces of Bush, Hawke's Bay, Wellington, Canterbury, and Auckland. In athletics, he was New Zealand long-jump champion.

Wood was a member of the New Zealand national team from 1901 to 1904. His 12 matches included New Zealand's first international test, against Australia. In his final match, he captained the Auckland province to a 13–0 defeat of the touring British and Irish Lions.

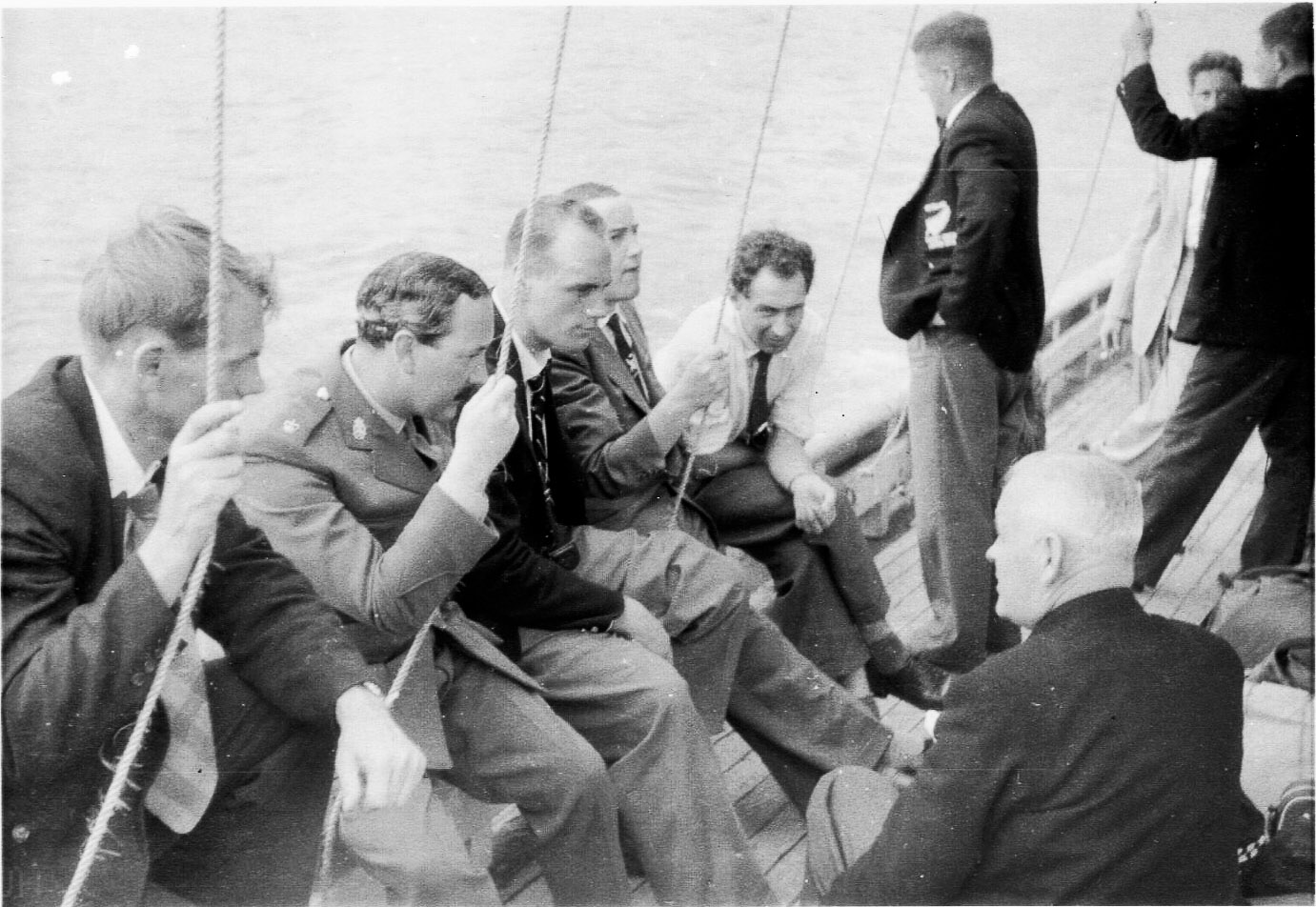
Morrie Wood and other All Blacks 'at leisure'

Wood's 1903 long jump of 21 ft 8 1/2 in (6.62 m) would have been the New Zealand record, but was eventually assessed as being wind-assisted and so was not ratified. He went on to win the long jump at the 1904 New Zealand athletics championships, his leap of 19 ft 7 1/2 in (5.98 m) taking the title from Te Rangi Hīroa.

== Personal life ==
Morrie Wood was born in Napier, one of four children born to English migrant parents. He had four children with his wife Clara Ritchey. After her death, he married Kate Donne in 1947. They retired to Paraparaumu, where he died in 1956 at the age of 79.
