= John Stalker (rugby union) =

New Zealand rugby union player

- Born: 11 February 1881 Dunedin, New Zealand
- Died: 28 November 1931 (aged 50) Feilding, New Zealand
- Weight: 76 kg (168 lb)
- Occupation: Retail manager

Rugby union career
- Position: Second five-eighth, three-quarter
Provincial / State sides
Years	Team	Apps	(Points)
1902–03	Otago		
1904–14	Manawatu	44	
International career
Years	Team	Apps	(Points)
1903	New Zealand	0	(0)

John Stalker (11 February 1881 – 28 November 1931) was a New Zealand rugby union player. A second five-eighth and three-quarter, Stalker represented Otago and Manawatu at a provincial level, and was a member of the New Zealand national side on their 1903 tour of Australia. He played six matches on that tour but did not appear in any internationals. Stalker later became a referee, officiating at matches to provincial level.

Stalker also enjoyed some success as an athlete, finishing second in the 440 yards at the 1901 national championships, and representing New Zealand at the Australasian championships the same year.
