= Jimmy Duncan (rugby union) =

James Duncan
- Jimmy Duncan
- Born: 12 November 1869 Dunedin, Otago, New Zealand
- Died: 19 October 1953 (aged 83) Dunedin, Otago, New Zealand
- Height: 1.75 m (5 ft 9 in)
- Weight: 82 kg (181 lb)

Rugby union career
- Position(s): Five-eighth, Wing Forward
International career
Years	Team	Apps	(Points)
1897–1903	New Zealand	10	(9)

James Duncan (12 November 1869 – 19 October 1953) was a New Zealand rugby union footballer, coach and referee. He captained New Zealand in its first test, and coached New Zealand in its first home test.

Duncan was born in Dunedin, New Zealand. He appeared for Otago, before being selected to play for New Zealand in 1897. He captained New Zealand for the first time against Wellington in 1901. He captained New Zealand in its first Test, against Australia, in 1903. That was also his last game for New Zealand.

Duncan then moved to coaching, coaching New Zealand in its first home test, against Great Britain, in 1904. In 1905, he was selected to coach the New Zealand team to tour the Northern Hemisphere. Duncan's appointment as coach was unpopular, and most of the coaching ended up being done by team members Billy Stead and Dave Gallaher instead.

In 1908 James Duncan refereed a Test between New Zealand and the Anglo-Welsh.

Duncan is credited with naming the position "five-eight"; as there was already positions half-back and three-quarters, he came up with the name according to the fraction between them.

== See also ==
- New Zealand national rugby union team
- The Original All Blacks (1905)
