= Matt Elliott (writer) =

Non-fiction writer, biographer and former New Zealand stand-up comedian

Matt Elliott (born 1969) is a non-fiction writer, biographer and former New Zealand stand-up comedian.

== Background ==
Elliott comes from Auckland and was educated at St Peter's College where he won the General excellence and senior English prizes in 1987.

== Comedy ==
Elliott began performing professionally as a stand-up comedian as a "nervous teenager" in 1989 at a late night cabaret at the Station Hotel, Auckland in a show called Lewd and the Ludicrous. In 1991 he was runner up in a comedy quest at Auckland's Abby's Hotel. Elliott then became part of a comedy collective called Laughter Mafia which performed weekly and successfully at the same venue which became the comedy venue of Auckland in 1991 and 1992. Elliott was also involved in monthly shows by comedians called "Comedyfest" at Kitty O'Brien's Irish Pub and other venues in 1992 and 1993. After his stint in Melbourne (see below), Elliott participated in the 1994 Auckland Watershed Comedy Festival.

== Melbourne ==
In early 1993, Elliott moved to Melbourne because opportunities to perform were limited in Auckland. Abby's had wound down and Kitty O'Brien's only offered five or ten minutes in a monthly show. Elliott was the first Kiwi comedian to work on the Melbourne circuit in the early 1990s. He appreciated the professionalism and competitiveness of the comedy scene in Melbourne and also the friendliness of the audiences. Elliott said: "sometimes the advertising for shows said that I was from New Zealand so I would start by saying 'I've just got to get something out of the way - fush and chups'. That would get a great reaction, then I would get on with the rest of my act". Often, Elliott was able to perform every night of the week at pub shows or in a succession of one-off monthly shows. As 1993 went on, his style became based more on one-liners than the longer material he had been doing in New Zealand - he felt that there was less for him to remember and also less for the audience to "wade through". After one and a half years, and having achieved his "professional goals", Elliott returned to Auckland in 1994.

== Career ==
From the 1990s, Elliott put on shows at Comedy and Fringe festivals, worked in television and film, wrote and directed satirical revues, and devised and taught a comedy writing course which spawned the Ministry of Chocolate Fisheries sketch comedy radio show on Plains FM. National Radio produced a story he wrote for children called Young Horace and Oscar's Trick in 1996. Elliott produced and presented a weekly radio show dedicated to promoting comedy - old and new - on Wellington Access Radio for two years and authored the satirical news blog mattelliottsbreaking news. Elliott's last stand-up comedy appearance was in 2007.

Elliott is known for his large collection of comedy audio and played selections from it on National Radio and with Graeme Hill on Radio Live. His knowledge of New Zealand comedy history was also used in television programmes such as New Zealand's Top 100 History Makers, Rocked the Nation 2: Top 100 Pop Culture Stories and History Under the Hammer. Elliott wrote a history of New Zealand comedy and, in 2009, a biography of the New Zealand comedy legend, Billy T James. The latter work was a best-selling non-fiction title and declared the best biography for 2009 by North & South. Elliott's best-selling collaboration with Chris Slane - Nice Day for a War (based on his grandfather's World War I diaries) - was named Non-fiction category winner and Book of the Year at the 2012 NZ Post Children's Book Awards.

== Bibliography of works by Matt Elliott ==
- Kiwi Jokers: The Rise and Rise of New Zealand Comedy, HarperCollins, Auckland, 1997.
- Billy T: the life and times of Billy T James, HarperCollins, Auckland, 2009.
- The Kiwi man cave (with Steve Hale), HarperCollins, Auckland, 2011.
- Nice day for a war (with Chris Slane), HarperCollins, 2011. (ISBN 9781869509019)
- Dave Gallaher - the Original All Black Captain, HarperCollins, Auckland, 2012.
- Kiwi Collectors: Curious and Unusual Kiwi Hobbies, HarperCollins, Auckland, 2013.
- Kieran Read: Tribute to a Great Eight, David Bateman, Auckland, 2014.
- On This Rock: 75 Years of St Peter's College, Mountain Road. St Peter's College, Auckland (2015). 2015. ISBN 978-0-473-331542.
- War Blacks: The Extraordinary Story of New Zealand's World War I All Blacks, HarperCollins, Auckland, 2016.
- Thorny Encounters: A History of England v the All Blacks, Pitch Publishing, London, 2018.
- Rugby Folklore: Myths, legends and events that made New Zealand rugby, HarperCollins, Auckland, 2019.
