= Winston McCarthy =

Winston John McCarthy (10 March 1908 – 2 January 1984) was a rugby union radio commentator during the 1940s through to the 1960s who became known as the "Voice of New Zealand Rugby". He is particular remembered for his broadcasts of the New Zealand Expeditionary Force "Kiwis" during the Second World War and later for All Blacks matches.

Born in Wellington he was educated at St Patrick's College. As a schoolboy, McCarthy recalled meeting VC winner Billy Hardham in 1922; "a very silent, simple man" living in a flat in Kelburn who had played rugby for Wellington 51 times, and who gave him a historic book on rugby.

A promising rugby union half-back, he played for the Manawatu B and Bush (Now part of Wairarapa-Bush) teams in the 1930s. In 1936 he moved to the South Island's West Coast and played rugby league for the Waiuta club before a shoulder injury ended his playing career.

He began a career in radio in 1937 when he began work as programme organiser for the National Broadcasting Service at station 2YD in Wellington. During the Second World War he worked with well-known sports broadcaster Wallie Ingram as a result of a posting to the Army Education and Welfare service. In 1945–46 he was chosen to broadcast commentaries of the games played in Europe by the Second New Zealand Expeditionary Force rugby team, nicknamed the Kiwis. These were the first live rugby broadcasts from the United Kingdom to New Zealand. It was during one of these matches that he coined his catch-phrase "Listen... Listen... It's a goal!".

His last commentary of a rugby test match was the final test of the 1959 British Lions tour. Before the era of television, when radio and rugby were New Zealand passions, he had broadcast 38 tests, creating vivid, unforgettable word pictures. He had also commentated other sports, such as cricket and boxing, and commentated at the 1950 and 1954 British Empire and Commonwealth and 1956 Olympic games. He was buried at Purewa Cemetery in the Auckland suburb of Meadowbank.
