= Ranfurly Shield =

New Zealand Rugby union football trophy

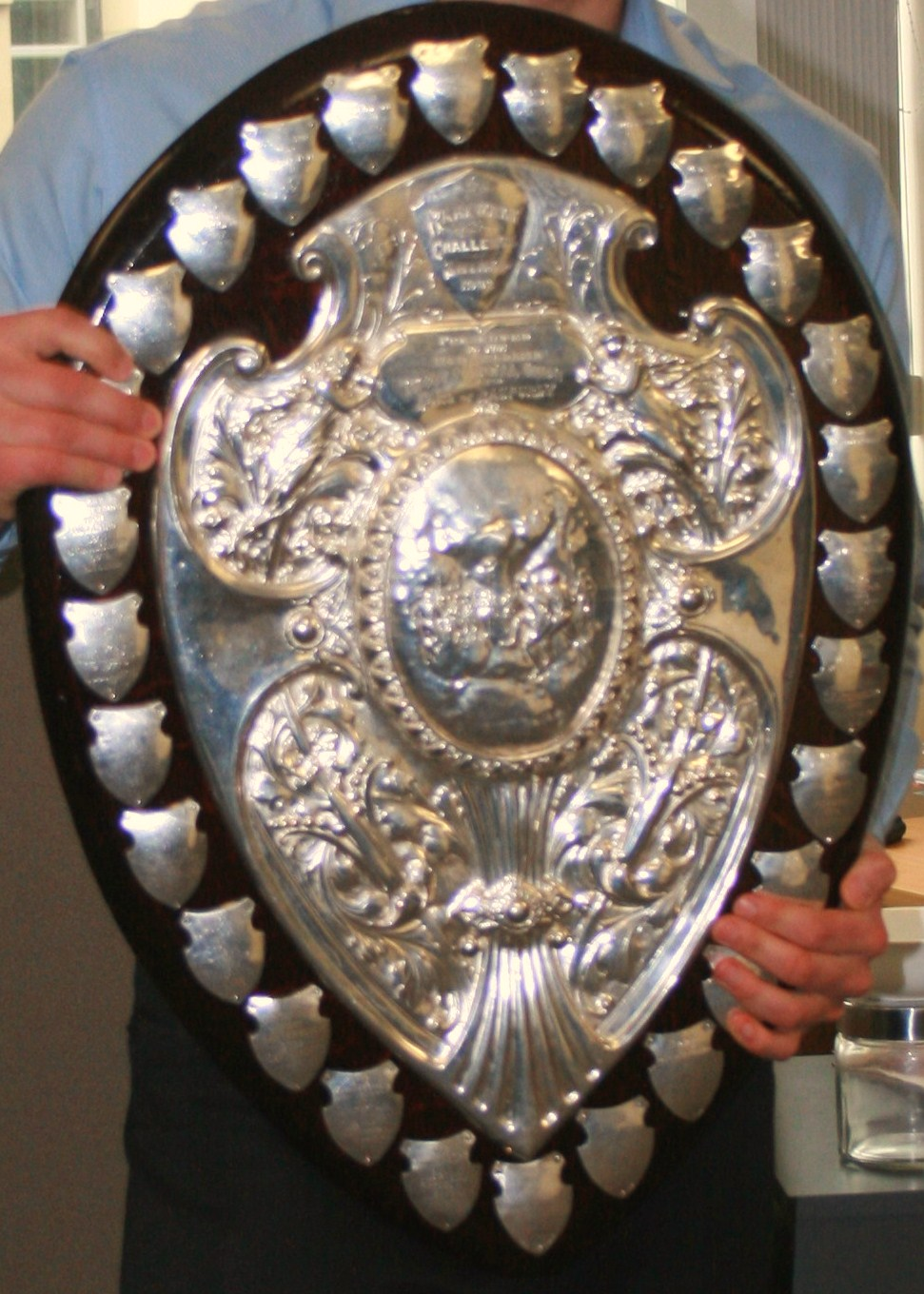
- Sport: Rugby union
- Presented by: New Zealand Rugby Union
- Type: Provincial challenge trophy
- First contested: 1904
- Current holder: Counties Manukau
- Official website: provincial.rugby/ranfurly-shield
- Current season: 2026

The Ranfurly Shield, colloquially known as the Log o' Wood, is a trophy in New Zealand's domestic rugby union competition. First played for in 1904, the Shield is based on a challenge system. The holding union must defend the shield in challenge matches, which are usually played at the shield holder's home venue, and if the challenger is successful in their challenge they will become the new holder of the Shield. There is a tradition for the first challenges of a new rugby season to be played against smaller associations from the Heartland Championship.

Although the professional era of rugby has seen other competitions, such as the NPC and Super Rugby, detracting from the pre-eminence of the Ranfurly Shield, many regard it as the greatest prize in New Zealand domestic rugby. This is mainly due to its long history, the fact that every challenge is a sudden-death defence of the Shield, and that any team has a chance to win.

The Shield is currently held by Counties Manukau, who won it from Northland in a 22–19 victory on 26 September 2026. Northland held the Shield since 20 August 2026, when they took the Shield off Canterbury.

Canterbury hold the record of the highest number of successful Ranfurly Shield challenges with 18 wins, two more than Auckland. Southland hold the record of the shortest Ranfurly Shield reign (six days).

== History ==
In 1901 the Governor of New Zealand, The 5th Earl of Ranfurly, announced that he would present a cup to the New Zealand Rugby Football Union to be used as the prize in a competition of their choosing. When the trophy, a shield, arrived, the NZRFU decided that it would be awarded to the union with the best record in the 1902 season, and thenceforth be the subject of a challenge system. Auckland, unbeaten in 1902, was presented with the shield. The shield was designed as a trophy for association football, not rugby. The picture in the centrepiece was a soccer one, and was modified by adding goal posts on the soccer goal in the picture to create a rugby scene. The alterations to the centrepiece are still apparent.

Auckland were on tour in 1903 and did not play any home games, and thus did not have to defend the Shield. Their first defence was against Wellington in 1904, and was unsuccessful.

Since the introduction of the National Provincial Championship in 1976, all home games a Shield-holder plays in the NPC or Heartland Championship, during league play are automatically challenge matches.

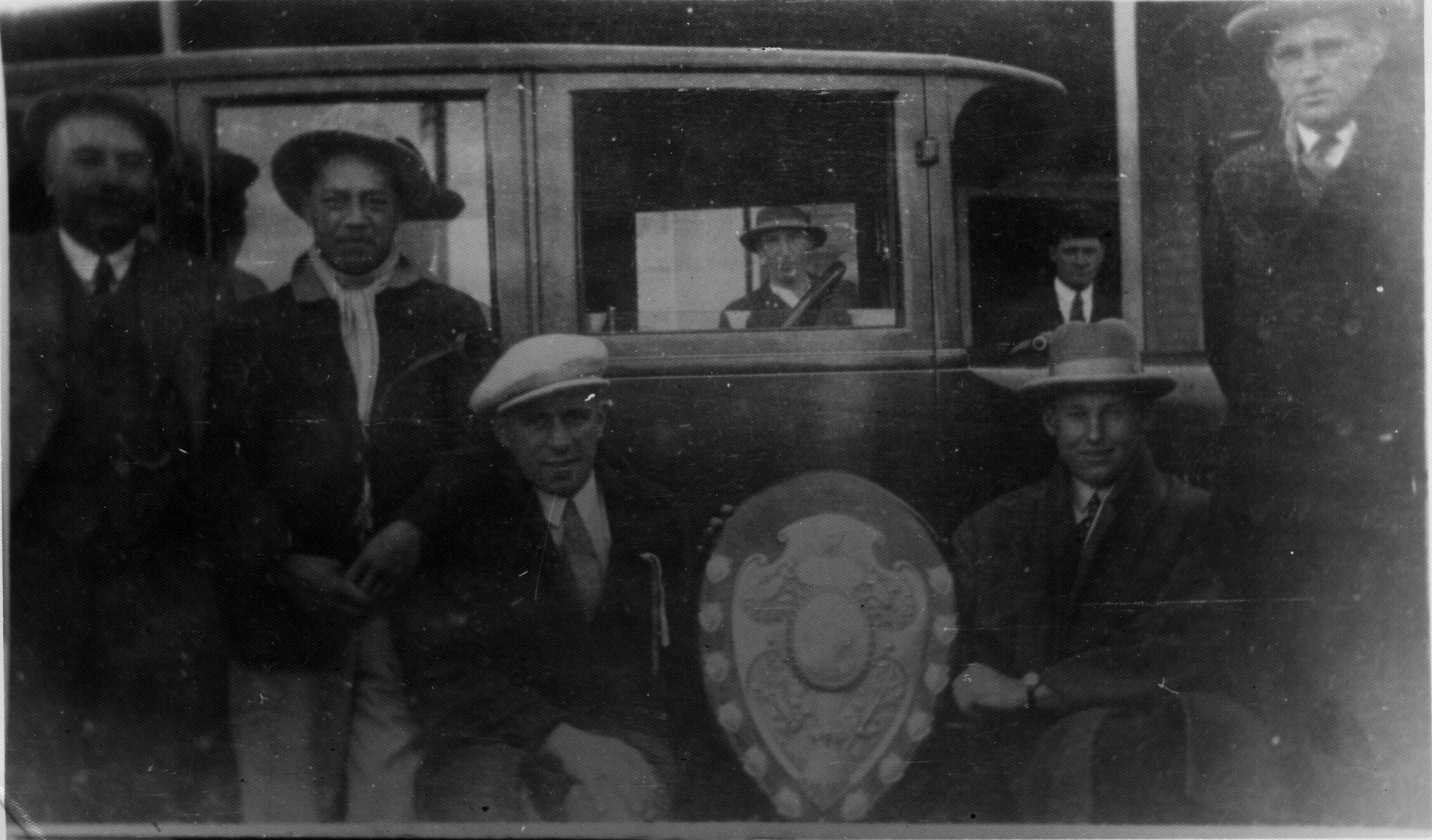
Ranfurly Shield Visit to Shannon 1927

Auckland holds the record for the greatest number of consecutive Shield defences, 61 matches between 14 September 1985 and 18 September 1993. During this period Auckland took the Shield on tour to provincial unions that, mainly for financial reasons, would be unlikely to be able to mount a challenge for the trophy. While dismissed by some critics, usually because of the one-sided scores, it was mostly regarded as a success by those involved.

In 1994 when Canterbury wrested the Shield from Waikato, it was in battered condition, with large cracks, chips and peeled varnish. Nearly a century of use had taken its toll. Canterbury player Chris England, skilled in woodwork, fully renovated it, bringing it back into pristine condition.

In 2023 the Shield was restored over nine months by Tri Peek in Waikanae, Wellington, who had been repairing the trophy for several years before the full restoration decision. The original Oak shield was replaced with English Oak from the Hutt Valley in New Zealand, seasoned for 5 years. The badges, already recently replaced in 2012 were moved to the new shield.

The old Shield, which had gradually become worn down by 118 years of handling and an untold number of celebrations, has been blessed and decommissioned by NZ Rugby Māori cultural adviser Luke Crawford, recognising its status as a taonga in rugby. The replacement shield was accidentally broken after being dropped on a concrete floor in September 2023 just after Hawke's Bay had won it from Wellington.

== Challenges ==
The Shield holder at the end of each season is required to accept at least seven challenges for the following year. All home games during league play, but not during knockout playoffs, in the NPC or Heartland Championship are automatic challenges. The remaining shield defences must be made up of challenges from unions in the other domestic competition. For example, since North Harbour, an Air New Zealand Cup (now NPC) team, held the Shield at the end of the 2006 Cup season despite losing their home quarter-final to Otago, they were forced to defend the Shield against Heartland Championship teams during the 2007 pre-season. Having successfully done so, all their home fixtures in the round-robin phase were Shield defences until they lost the shield to Waikato.

The Shield-holder is never forced to defend the Shield in an away match, although they may choose to, as Auckland, for example, did on a number of occasions during their record tenure between 1985 and 1993. In 2008, Auckland played both their mandatory defences against Heartland teams on the road.

If a challenger successfully takes the Shield, all of their home matches for the rest of the season are defences of it.

=== Proposed rule changes ===
In August 2008, the New Zealand Rugby Union released a competitions review that proposed dramatic changes to the Shield rules:

- Once a team has successfully defended the Shield four times, all of the holder's subsequent matches in league play would be mandatory defences, whether home or away. The Shield will not be at stake in semifinals or finals.
- If an Air New Zealand Cup team holds the Shield at the end of the league season, that season's winners of the Meads Cup and Lochore Cup, the two trophies contested in the second-level Heartland Championship, will receive automatic challenges in the following year.

The changes were not implemented but did receive support from Auckland, which held the Shield when the NZRU released its report.

== Current teams ==
Just under half of the unions that can contest for the Ranfurly Shield do not have an alias. South Canterbury's emblem is their own Coat of Arms. But a soldier represents their green and black colour and current mascot, Tim and Ru. The mascots were originally used during wartime and were created by Ronald Murray. Many of the unions below have this situation, like Poverty Bay's Weka, it resembles their mascot after the 2011 squads post-match photo after the Lochore Cup final.

Team	Established	Alias	Area	Stadia	First held
Auckland; A.R.U	1883	HMS Endeavour	Auckland, Auckland	Eden Park	1905
Buller; B.R.U	1894	Lion	Westport, West Coast	Victoria Square	—
Bay of Plenty; B.O.P.R.U	1911	Pohutu Geyser	Mount Maunganui, Bay of Plenty	Rotorua International Stadium	2004
Canterbury; C.R.F.U	1879	Lamb	Christchurch, Canterbury	One NZ Stadium	1927
Counties Manukau; C.M.R.F.U	1955	Glenbrook Steel Mill	Pukekohe, Auckland	Growers Stadium	2013
East Coast; E.C.R.F.U	1922	Pōhutukawa	Ruatoria, Gisborne	Whakarua Park	—
Hawke's Bay; H.B.R.U	1884	Magpie	Napier, Hawke's Bay	McLean Park	1922
Horowhenua Kapiti; H.K.R.F.U	1893	Rugby football	Levin, Manawatū-Whanganui	Levin Domain	1927 (as Manawhenua)
King Country; K.C.R.F.U	1922	Ram	Te Kūiti, King Country	Owen Delany Park	—
Manawatu; M.R.U	1886	Wind turbine	Palmerston North, Manawatū-Whanganui	Central Energy Trust Arena	1927 (as Manawhenua)
Mid Canterbury; M.C.R.U	1904	Hammer	Ashburton, Canterbury	Ashburton Showgrounds	—
Northland; N.R.U	1920	Taniwha	Whangārei, Northland	Okara Park	1950 (as North Auckland)
North Harbour; N.H.R.U	1985	Hibiscus	Albany, Auckland	North Harbour Stadium	2006
North Otago; N.O.R.F.U	1904	Gold	Oamaru, Otago	Centennial Park	—
Otago; O.R.F.U	1881	Razorback	Dunedin, Otago	Forsyth Barr Stadium	1935
Poverty Bay; P.B.R.F.U	1890	Weka	Gisborne, Gisborne	Rugby Park	—
Southland; R.S	1887	Stag	Invercargill, Southland	Rugby Park Stadium	1920
South Canterbury; S.C.R.F.U	1888	Soldier*	Timaru, Canterbury	Fraser Park	1950
Taranaki; T.R.F.U	1889	Bull	New Plymouth, Taranaki	Yarrow Stadium	1913
Tasman; T.R.U	2006	Shortfin mako shark	Nelson, Nelson	Trafalgar Park	1973 (as Marlborough)
Thames Valley; T.V.R.F.U	1922	Swamp Fox	Paeroa, Waikato	Paeroa Domain	—
Waikato; W.R.U	1921	Mooloo	Hamilton, Waikato	Waikato Stadium	1951
Wairarapa Bush; W.B.R.F.U	1971	Castle Rock	Masterton, Wellington	Memorial Park	1927 (as Wairarapa)
Whanganui; W.R.F.U	1888	Butcher	Whanganui, Manawatū-Whanganui	Cooks Gardens	—
Wellington; W.R.F.U	1879	Lion	Wellington, Wellington	Hnry Stadium	1904
West Coast; W.C.R.U	1890	Swan	Greymouth, West Coast	Rugby Park	—

== Results ==
Match	Date	Holder	Score	Challenger	Venue	Defences
1	6 August 1904	Auckland	3–6	Wellington	Alexandra Park	0
6	26 August 1905	Wellington	6–10	Auckland	Athletic Park	4
30	16 August 1913	Auckland	11–14	Taranaki	Alexandra Park	23
37	10 September 1914	Taranaki	6–12	Wellington	Victoria Park	6
53	15 September 1920	Wellington	6–17	Southland	Rugby Park	15
55	10 September 1921	Southland	13–28	Wellington	Athletic Park	1
58	9 August 1922	Wellington	9–19	Hawke's Bay	Athletic Park	2
83	3 June 1927	Hawke's Bay	11–15	Wairarapa	McLean Park	24
86	6 August 1927	Wairarapa	16–18	Manawhenua	Showgrounds Oval	2*
89	7 September 1927	Manawhenua	6–17	Canterbury	Showgrounds Oval	2
91	18 July 1928	Canterbury	7–8	Wairarapa	Lancaster Park Oval	1
100	31 August 1929	Wairarapa	16–19	Southland	Showgrounds Oval	8
104	3 September 1930	Southland	3–12	Wellington	Rugby Park	3
106	22 August 1931	Wellington	6–8	Canterbury	Athletic Park	1
122	21 July 1934	Canterbury	0–9	Hawke's Bay	Lancaster Park Oval	15
125	8 September 1934	Hawke's Bay	14–18	Auckland	McLean Park	2
127	10 August 1935	Auckland	13–16	Canterbury	Eden Park	1
132	21 September 1935	Canterbury	6–15	Otago	Lancaster Park Oval	4
141	31 July 1937	Otago	7–12	Southland	Carisbrook Ground	8
142	30 July 1938	Southland	6–7	Otago	Rugby Park	0
148	10 September 1938	Otago	5–10	Southland	Carisbrook Ground	5
160	2 August 1947	Southland	11–17	Otago	Rugby Park	11
179	16 August 1950	Otago	0–8	Canterbury	Carisbrook Ground	18
180	2 September 1950	Canterbury	0–3	Wairarapa	Lancaster Park Oval	0
181	16 September 1950	Wairarapa	14–17	South Canterbury	Solway Showgrounds Oval	0
182	30 September 1950	South Canterbury	9–20	North Auckland	Fraser Park	0
185	18 August 1951	North Auckland	3–6	Waikato	Rugby Park	2
192	9 August 1952	Waikato	0–9	Auckland	Rugby Park	6
193	23 August 1952	Auckland	3–6	Waikato	Eden Park	0
200	1 August 1953	Waikato	6–9	Wellington	Rugby Park	6
206	19 September 1953	Wellington	3–24	Canterbury	Athletic Park	5
230	22 September 1956	Canterbury	0–8	Wellington	Lancaster Park Oval	23
235	24 August 1957	Wellington	11–19	Otago	Athletic Park	4
237	28 September 1957	Otago	9–11	Taranaki	Carisbrook	1
251	5 September 1959	Taranaki	6–23	Southland	Rugby Park	13

- Wairarapa's 1927-era saw them lose to Hawke's Bay 21–10 at Solway Showgrounds Oval, but was subsequently awarded the shield back on a residential breach.

Ranfurly Shield holders
Union	Won	Successful defences
Southland	5 September 1959	0
Auckland	23 September 1959	2
North Auckland	20 August 1960	1
Auckland	31 August 1960	25
Wellington	31 August 1963	0
Taranaki	7 September 1963	15
Auckland	11 September 1965	3
Waikato	27 August 1966	0
Hawke's Bay	24 September 1966	21
Canterbury	27 September 1969	9
Auckland	28 August 1971	1
North Auckland	18 September 1971	6
Auckland	26 August 1972	0
Canterbury	5 September 1972	2
Marlborough	28 July 1973	6
South Canterbury	17 August 1974	1
Wellington	3 September 1974	1
Auckland	21 September 1974	10
Manawatu	21 August 1976	13
North Auckland	12 September 1978	5
Auckland	21 September 1979	6
Waikato	7 September 1980	8
Wellington	1 August 1981	4
Canterbury	18 September 1982	25
Auckland	14 September 1985	61
Waikato	18 September 1993	5
Canterbury	3 September 1994	9
Auckland	23 September 1995	3
Taranaki	24 August 1996	1
Waikato	8 September 1996	1
Auckland	4 October 1996	6
Waikato	5 October 1997	21
Canterbury	23 September 2000	23
Auckland	11 October 2003	2
Bay of Plenty	15 August 2004	1
Canterbury	5 September 2004	14
North Harbour	24 September 2006	3
Waikato	24 August 2007	0
Canterbury	1 September 2007	1
Auckland	29 September 2007	5
Wellington	20 September 2008	5
Canterbury	29 August 2009	4
Southland	22 October 2009	6
Canterbury	9 October 2010	2
Southland	23 July 2011	2
Taranaki	24 August 2011	7
Waikato	3 October 2012	4
Otago	23 August 2013	0
Hawke's Bay	1 September 2013	0
Counties Manukau	7 September 2013	6
Hawke's Bay	30 August 2014	11
Waikato	9 October 2015	6
Canterbury	28 September 2016	7
Taranaki	6 October 2017	4
Waikato	9 September 2018	2
Otago	13 October 2018	6
Canterbury	28 September 2019	2
Taranaki	19 September 2020	0
Otago	27 September 2020	0
Hawke's Bay	4 October 2020	14
Wellington	17 September 2022	7
Hawke's Bay	30 September 2023	4
Tasman	7 September 2024	2
Taranaki	6 October 2024	3
Waikato	23 August 2025	0
Southland	31 August 2025	0
Canterbury	6 September 2025	1
Otago	20 September 2025	3
Canterbury	9 August 2026	1
Northland	20 August 2026	2
Counties Manukau	26 September 2026	1

=== Overall records ===
Team	Wins	Successful defences	Average defences
Canterbury	18	143	7.94
Auckland	16	148	9.25
Waikato	12	59	4.92
Wellington	11	48	4.36
Taranaki	8	49	6.13
Otago	8	41	5.13
Southland	8	23	2.88
Hawke's Bay	7	76	10.86
Northland	5	16	3.20
Wairarapa	3	10	3.33
Counties Manukau	2	7	3.50
South Canterbury	2	1	0.50
Manawatu	1	13	13
Marlborough	1	6	6
North Harbour	1	3	3
Manawhenua	1	2	2
Tasman	1	2	2
Bay of Plenty	1	1	1

Last updated: after Counties Manukau successfully defended the Shield on 3 October 2026.

== See also ==
- Ranfurly Shield 1904–1909
- Ranfurly Shield 1910–1919
- Ranfurly Shield 1920–1929
- Ranfurly Shield 1930–1939
- Ranfurly Shield 1960–1969
- Ranfurly Shield 1970–1979
- Ranfurly Shield 1980–1989
- Ranfurly Shield 1990–1999
- Ranfurly Shield 2000–2009
  - Ranfurly Shield in 2009
- Ranfurly Shield 2010–2019
- Ranfurly Shield 2020–2029
- Hanan Shield
- Rundle Cup
