= Ranfurly Shield 1904–1909 =

New Zealand rugby union trophy

The Ranfurly Shield, colloquially known as the Log o' Wood, is arguably the most prestigious trophy in New Zealand's domestic rugby union competition. First played for in 1904, the Ranfurly Shield is based on a challenge system, rather than a league or knockout competition as with most football trophies. The holding union must defend the Shield in challenge matches, and if a challenger defeats them, they become the new holder of the Shield.

== Holders ==
Only two teams held the Ranfurly Shield from 1904 to 1909:

Union	Won	Successful defences
Auckland	Awarded in 1902	0
Wellington	6 August 1904	4
Auckland	26 August 1905	12

== Fixtures ==
=== 1904 ===
6 August 1904
Match 1

Auckland	3–6	Wellington
Try: Henry Kiernan		Try: Donaldson Gray, Duncan McGregor

Alexandra Park, Auckland
Attendance: 9,000
Referee: W. Pitts (Auckland)

20 August 1904
Match 2

Wellington	6–3	Canterbury
Try: Billy Wallace (2)		Try: P.J. Burns

Athletic Park, Wellington
Attendance: 2,000
Referee: Alfred Norris (Wellington)

10 September 1904

Wellington	15–13	Otago
Try: Duncan McGregor (2), Billy Wallace; Con: Duncan McGregor; Goal from mark: Duncan McGregor		Try: James Duncan King, W.J. Munro, Colin Gilray; Con: Ernest Booth (2)

Athletic Park, Wellington
Attendance: 1,500
Referee: Francis Evans (Canterbury)

=== 1905 ===
16 August 1905

Wellington	3–3	Wairarapa
Try: William James Hardham		Try: R. Spackman

Athletic Park, Wellington
Attendance: 850
Referee: G.A. Howe (Wellington)

23 August 1905

Wellington	11–3	Hawke's Bay
Try: John Spencer, J.P. Blacklock, P.A. Anderson; Con: George Spencer		Try: M. McCarthy

Athletic Park, Wellington
Referee: G.A. Howe (Wellington)

26 August 1905

Wellington	6–10	Auckland
Pen: George Spencer (2)		Try: Richard Wynyard, William Tyler; Drop: Arthur Francis

Athletic Park, Wellington
Attendance: 6,000
Referee: J.F. Manning (Manawatu)

=== 1906 ===
11 August 1906

Auckland	29–6	Canterbury
Try: Richard Wynyard (2), William Hay-MacKenzie, George Nicholson, Charlie Seeling; Con: John Henry Dufty (4); Pen: John Henry Dufty; Drop: John Henry Dufty		Pen: Donald Fraser; Drop: Donald Fraser

Alexandra Park, Auckland
Attendance: 7,000
Referee: G.A. Howe (Wellington)

18 August 1906

Auckland	18–5	Taranaki
Try: George Gillett, Charlie Seeling, R.B. Magee; Con: John Henry Dufty (3); Drop: John Henry Dufty		Try: Donald Cameron; Con: Arthur Hardgrave

Alexandra Park, Auckland
Attendance: 9,000
Referee: G.A. Howe (Wellington)

25 August 1906

Auckland	48–12	Southland
Try: George Nicholson (3), George Smith (2), William Hay-MacKenzie (2), William Tyler, Henry Kiernan, Frank Wilson; Con: John Henry Dufty (7); Drop: John Henry Dufty		Try: T.A. Clark; Con: Donald Cameron Hamilton; Pen: Donald Cameron Hamilton; Drop: E.E. Hughes

Alexandra Park, Auckland
Attendance: 6,000
Referee: F.A. Laws (Auckland)

1 September 1906

Auckland	11–5	Wellington
Try: Richard Wynyard; Con: John Henry Dufty; Pen: John Henry Dufty; Drop: John Henry Dufty		Try: Hector Thomson; Con: Billy Wallace

Alexandra Park, Auckland
Attendance: 13,000
Referee: Peter Mackie (Auckland)

=== 1907 ===
13 July 1907

Auckland	21–0	Buller
Try: G.W. Murray (3), Richard Wynyard (3), C. Dillamore

Alexandra Park, Auckland
Referee: Angus Campbell (Auckland)

10 August 1907

Auckland	12–3	Hawke's Bay
Try: Harold Hayward, G.W. Murray, J.H. Hall, William Wynyard		Try: T. McIntyre

Alexandra Park, Auckland
Attendance: 4,000
Referee: G. Hopkins (Taranaki)

14 September 1907

Auckland	6–5	Wanganui
Try: Albert Asher, J.H. Hall		Try: Albert Carroll; Con: L.L. Hitchings

Alexandra Park, Auckland
Attendance: 6,000
Referee: Angus Campbell (Auckland)

=== 1908 ===
8 August 1908

Auckland	32–0	Marlborough
Try: E. Coote (2), Frank Wilson, R.B. Magee, Arthur Francis, G.W. Murray, Charlie Seeling; Con: R.B. Magee (4); Drop: R.B. Magee

Alexandra Park, Auckland
Attendance: 4,000
Referee: N. A'Court (Taranaki)

15 August 1908

Auckland	24–3	Wellington
Try: George Bater (2), G.W. Murray (2), George Nicholson; Con: R.B. Magee (3); Drop: R.B. Magee		Try: W.C. Alexander

Alexandra Park, Auckland
Attendance: 12,000
Referee: J. Williams (Otago)

29 August 1908

Auckland	9–0	Taranaki
Try: George Gillett, C.W. Murray; Pen: George Gillett

Alexandra Park, Auckland
Attendance: 8,000
Referee: J. Williams (Otago)

12 September 1908

Auckland	11–5	Otago
Try: George Bater, Frank Morse, G.W. Murray; Con: R.B. Magee		Try: Alex McDonald; Con: Harry Paton

Alexandra Park, Auckland
Attendance: 3,000
Referee: G.A. Howe (Wellington)

=== 1909 ===
11 September 1909

Auckland	18–5	Taranaki
Try: Dougie McGregor (2), George Sellars, G.W. Murray, Harold Hayward, Joe O'Leary		Try: Donald Cameron; Con: Ernest Dive

Alexandra Park, Auckland
Attendance: 6,000
Referee: J. Williams (Auckland)
