= Whakarewarewa =

Suburb of Rotorua, New Zealand

- Suburb
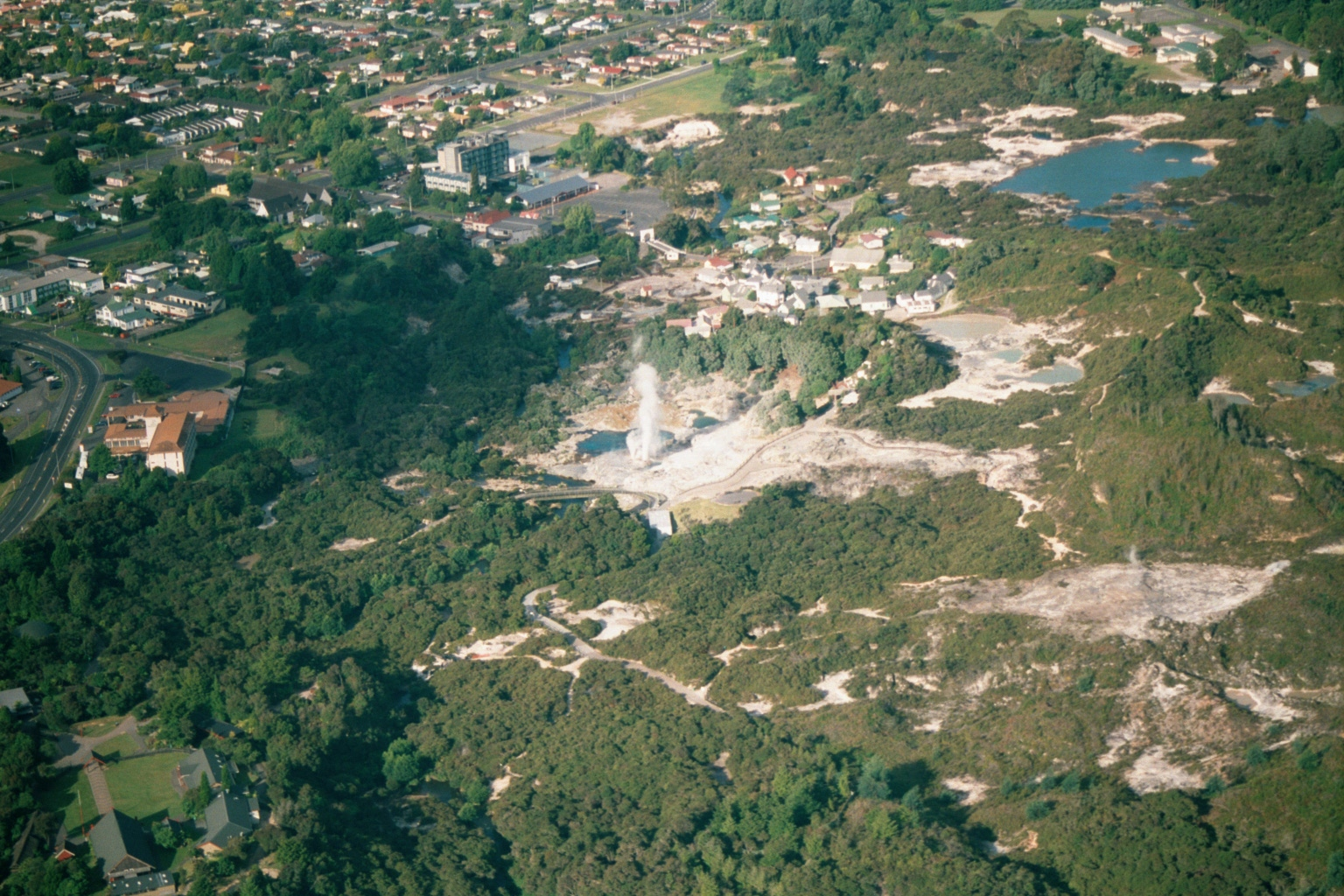
- Aerial view of Whakarewarewa; Pōhutu Geyser is erupting.
- Interactive map of Whakarewarewa
- Coordinates: 38°9′44″S 176°15′23″E
- Country: New Zealand
- City: Rotorua
- Local authority: Rotorua Lakes Council
- Electoral ward: Te Ipu Wai Auraki General Ward

Area
  - Land: 328 ha (810 acres)

Population (June 2025)
  - Total: 920
  - Density: 280/km^{2} (730/sq mi)

Springfield	Glenholme	Ngāpuna
	Whakarewarewa

Whakarewarewa (reduced version of Te Whakarewarewatanga O Te Ope Taua A Wahiao, meaning "The gathering place for the war parties of Wahiao", often abbreviated to Whaka by locals) is a semi-rural geothermal area in Rotorua, New Zealand. Located in the Taupō Volcanic Zone of New Zealand's North Island, it was the site of the Māori fortress of Te Puia, first occupied around 1325 and known as an impenetrable stronghold never taken in battle. Māori have lived here ever since, taking full advantage of the geothermal activity in the valley for heating and cooking.

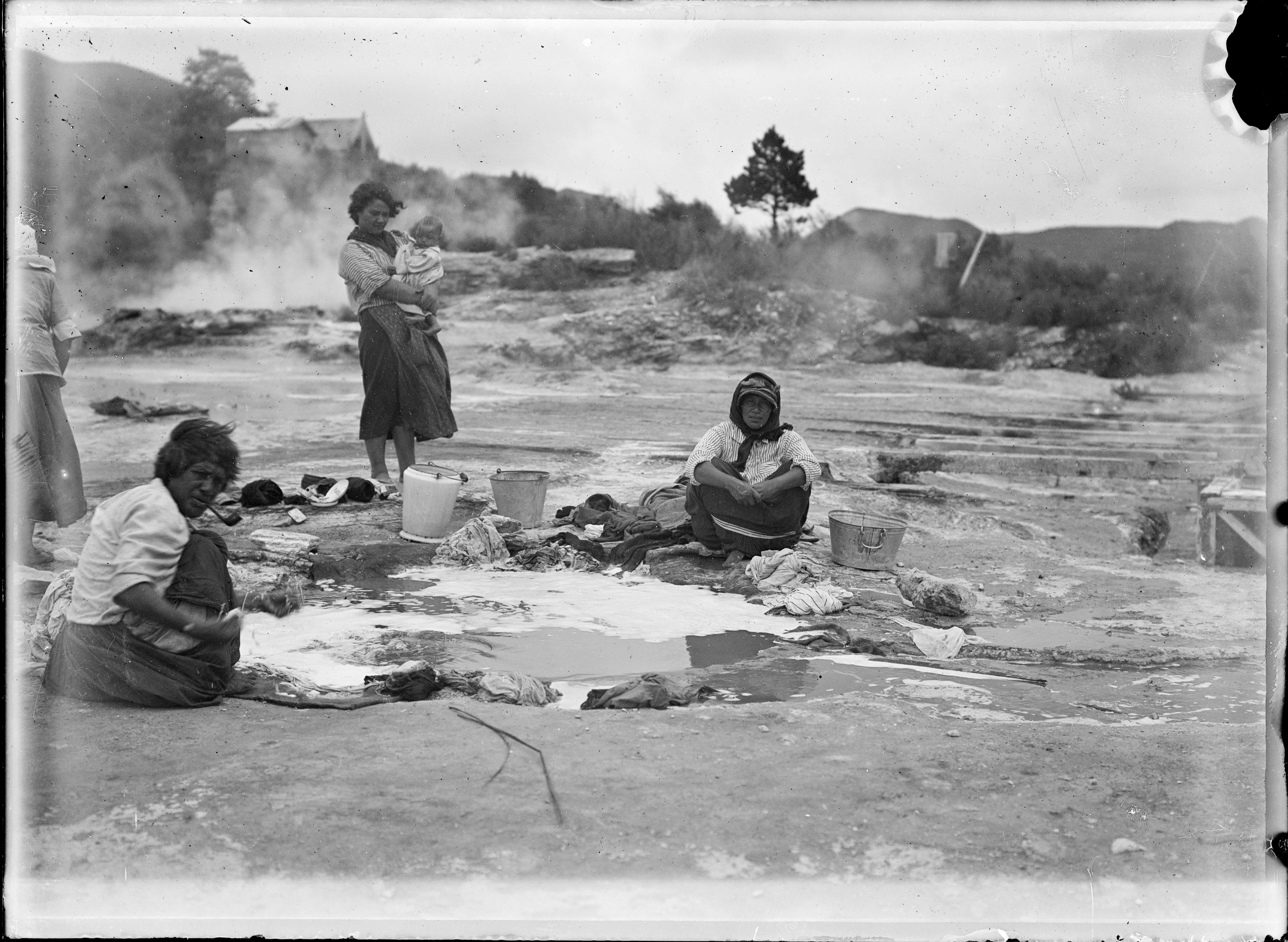
Māori women washing clothes in a hot pool at Whakarewarewa in 1916

Whakarewarewa has some 500 pools, most of which are alkaline chloride hot springs, and at least 65 geyser vents, each with their own name. Seven geysers are currently active. Pōhutu Geyser erupts approximately hourly to heights of up to 30 m (98 ft).

Many of the thermal features at Whakarewarewa have been adversely affected by Rotorua residents taking advantage of the underlying geothermal fluids of the city by drawing shallow wells (20–200 m [66–656 ft] deep) to extract hot water for both domestic and commercial heating. A bore closure programme in 1987–1988 resulted in 106 wells within 1.5 km (0.93 mi) of Pōhutu Geyser being cemented shut, with another 120 wells outside the radius being shut due to a punitive royalty charging regime. There has subsequently been a pronounced recovery in the geysers and hot springs at Whakarewarewa.

== Marae ==
The area features Te Pākira Marae and Wahiao meeting house, a meeting place of the Tūhourangi hapū of Ngāti Puta, Ngāti Uruhina, Ngāti Wāhiao, Tūhourangi and Ngāti Taoi.

== Geysers ==
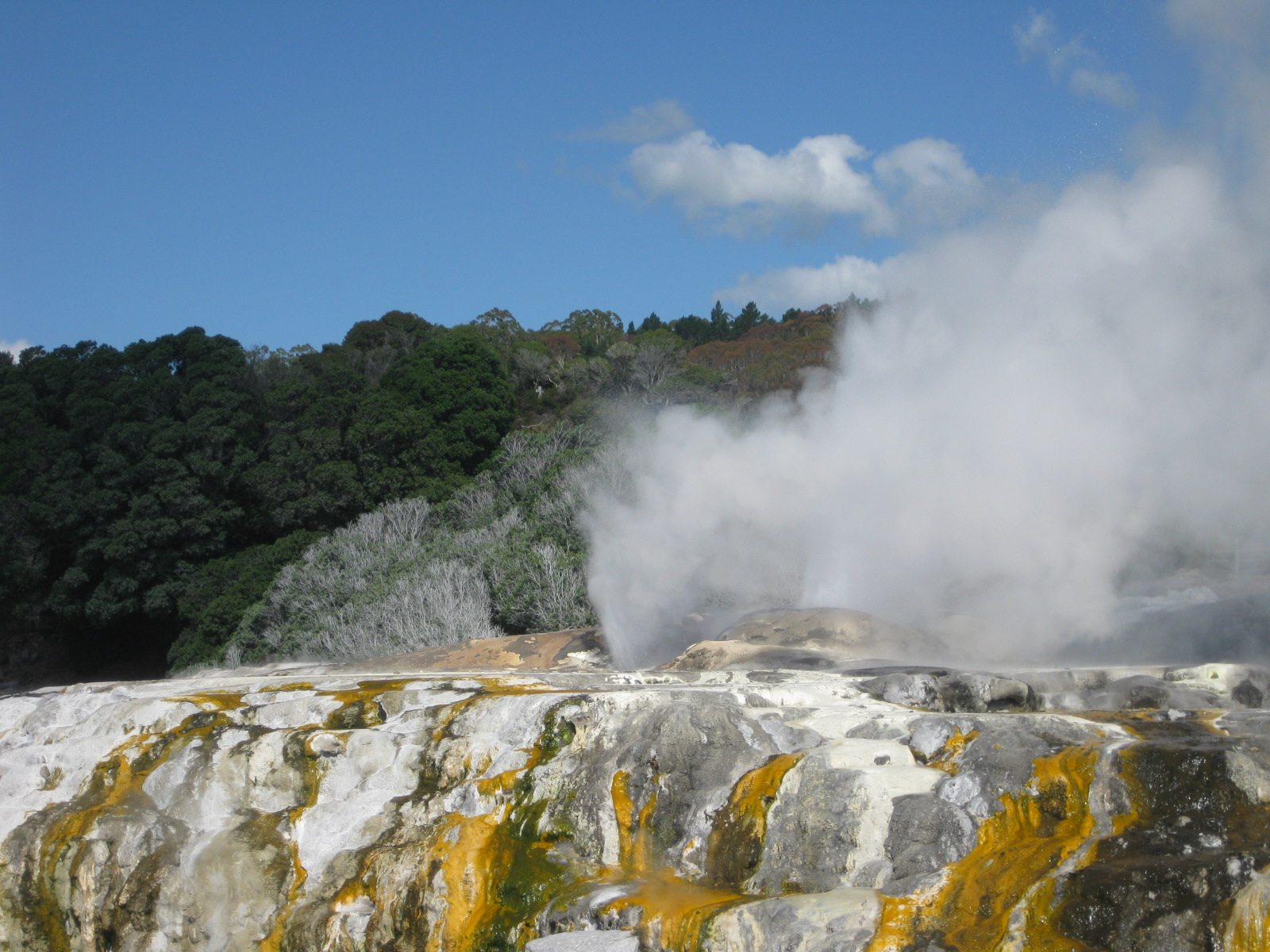
Prince of Wales Feathers geyser erupting.

Most of the currently active geysers at Whakarewarewa are located on Geyser Flat and aligned on a common fissure. This is a highly complex system, with the activity of one geyser affecting another.

Kereru Geyser, about 2 m (6 ft 7 in) above Puarenga Stream, located at the head of a small apron of blackish sinter, erupts every few days or weeks, in a fan-shaped jet 15 m (49 ft) high. No large eruptions occurred between 1972 and 1988, and it seems its recovery was directly linked to the sudden reduction of well draw off in 1987. Kereru Geyser is probably independent of other springs on the fissure.

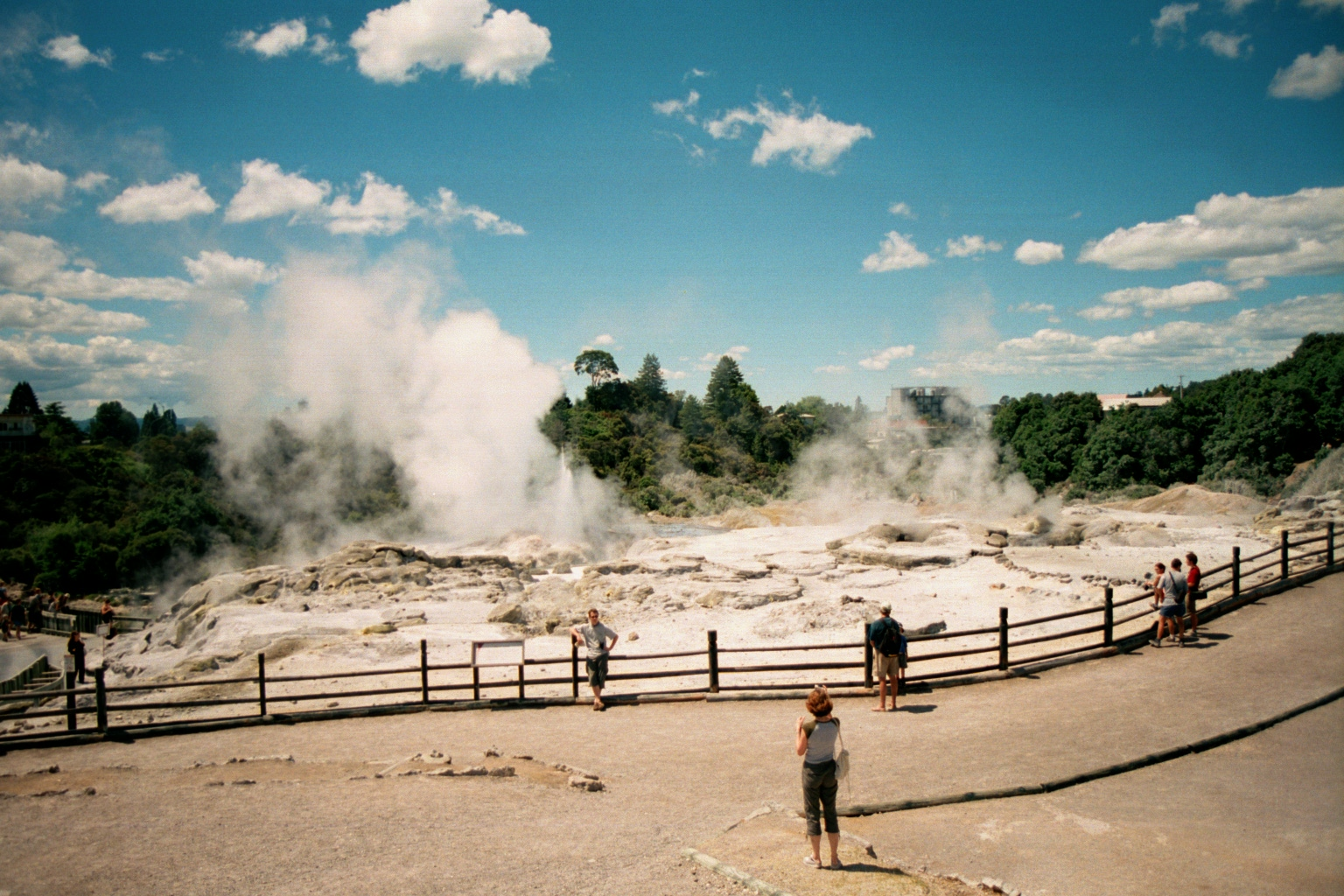
Geyser Flat

Prince of Wales Feathers Geyser, Pōhutu Geyser, Te Horu Geyser (The Cauldron) and Waikorohihi Geyser are on a sinter plateau about 6 m (20 ft) above Puarenga Stream. Prince of Wales Feathers Geyser, also known as Te Tohu, is the closet to Pōhutu. Prior to 1901 it was known as the Indicator, because its eruptions typically precede those of Pōhutu, in a feeble jet at first but gradually increasing in power until a continuous 9-metre-high (30 ft) column is ejected at an angle, when Pōhutu usually erupts also. Sometimes Waikorohihi Geyser erupts a discontinuous 5-metre-high (16 ft 5 in) jet, then Prince of Wales Feathers will commence, later followed by Pōhutu.

Until 1972, Te Horu Geyser erupted 2–7 m (10–20 ft) high as often as 10–15 times each day, but after that time eruptions and even boiling ceased. The water in Te Horu's vent began to overflow again in 1998. A very direct connection exists between Te Horu and Pōhutu, with air-cooled water erupted from Pōhutu largely falling in Te Horu's vent. This may explain the popular belief that Pōhutu is more active when there is a south wind, because most erupted water is then blown away to the north, whereas with a north wind much is returned to cool the system and delay the next eruption.

Mahanga Geyser, also called the Boxing Glove, is an old geyser not known to erupt until 1961. Its 3–4.5-metre-high (9 ft 10 in – 14 ft 9 in) eruptions occur quite independently of its near neighbour Waikorohihi.

Wairoa Geyser, acclaimed as erupting 60 m (200 ft) high, last erupted naturally in December 1940 after which its water level fell to 4.5 m (15 ft) below overflow and the water became acidic. However, in early 1996, its water level rose to 3.2 m (10 ft) below overflow, with continuous powerful boiling, and it remains so to date.

Beyond Geyser Flat is Waikite Geyser, which forms the apex of a prominent sinter mound 260 m south of Pōhutu. This last erupted in March 1967, and since then the vent has remained dry and weakly steaming. In June 1996, its previously 8.5 m (28 ft) deep and dry vent suddenly filled with boiling water which rose to within 2.3 m (7 ft 7 in) of overflow. In the past Waikite tended to erupt after prolonged periods of excessive rain, suggesting that the level of water in its vent is dependent on rainfall. It is hoped that Waikite may one day erupt again. Meanwhile, Pareia Geyser, just beyond Waikite, has recently reactivated.

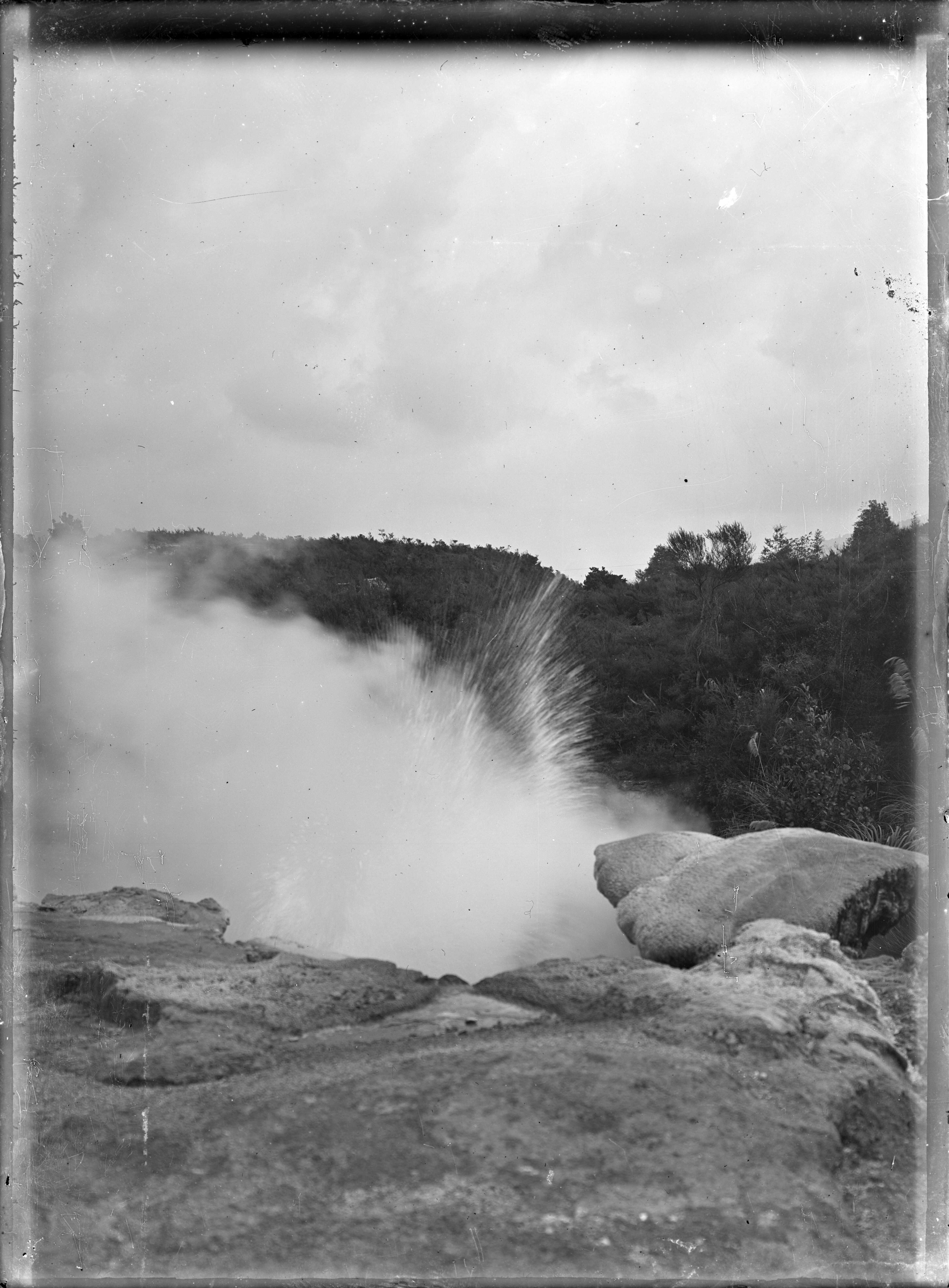
Photograph of the Papakura Geyser in 1916 by Albert Percy Godber

Papakura Geyser became dormant in 1979 and was thought to be extinct until December 2015, when it returned with a 4 metre high eruption for 36 hours. The cessation of eruptions from Papakura was directly responsible for initiation of the Rotorua Monitoring Programme in 1981.

== Demographics ==
Tihiotonga-Whakarewarewa statistical area covers 3.28 km^{2} (1.27 sq mi) and had an estimated population of 920 as of June 2025, with a population density of 280 people per km^{2}.

Historical population
Year	Pop.	±% p.a.
2006	813	—
2013	675	−2.62%
2018	771	+2.70%
2023	873	+2.52%

Tihiotonga-Whakarewarewa had a population of 873 in the 2023 New Zealand census, an increase of 102 people (13.2%) since the 2018 census, and an increase of 198 people (29.3%) since the 2013 census. There were 417 males and 453 females in 324 dwellings. 2.4% of people identified as LGBTIQ+. The median age was 39.1 years (compared with 38.1 years nationally). There were 177 people (20.3%) aged under 15 years, 144 (16.5%) aged 15 to 29, 405 (46.4%) aged 30 to 64, and 144 (16.5%) aged 65 or older.

People could identify as more than one ethnicity. The results were 54.0% European (Pākehā); 45.0% Māori; 4.1% Pasifika; 14.8% Asian; 0.7% Middle Eastern, Latin American and African New Zealanders (MELAA); and 3.1% other, which includes people giving their ethnicity as "New Zealander". English was spoken by 94.2%, Māori by 15.1%, Samoan by 0.3%, and other languages by 12.0%. No language could be spoken by 2.4% (e.g. too young to talk). The percentage of people born overseas was 20.3, compared with 28.8% nationally.

Religious affiliations were 33.0% Christian, 4.5% Hindu, 0.3% Islam, 4.5% Māori religious beliefs, 0.3% Buddhist, 0.3% New Age, and 2.4% other religions. People who answered that they had no religion were 49.1%, and 5.5% of people did not answer the census question.

Of those at least 15 years old, 171 (24.6%) people had a bachelor's or higher degree, 363 (52.2%) had a post-high school certificate or diploma, and 162 (23.3%) people exclusively held high school qualifications. The median income was $41,300, compared with $41,500 nationally. 93 people (13.4%) earned over $100,000 compared to 12.1% nationally. The employment status of those at least 15 was 339 (48.7%) full-time, 111 (15.9%) part-time, and 30 (4.3%) unemployed.

== Education ==
Whakarewarewa School is a co-educational state primary school for Year 1 to 8 students, with a roll of 108 as of July 2025. It opened in 1902 as Whakarewarewa native school.

== Gallery ==
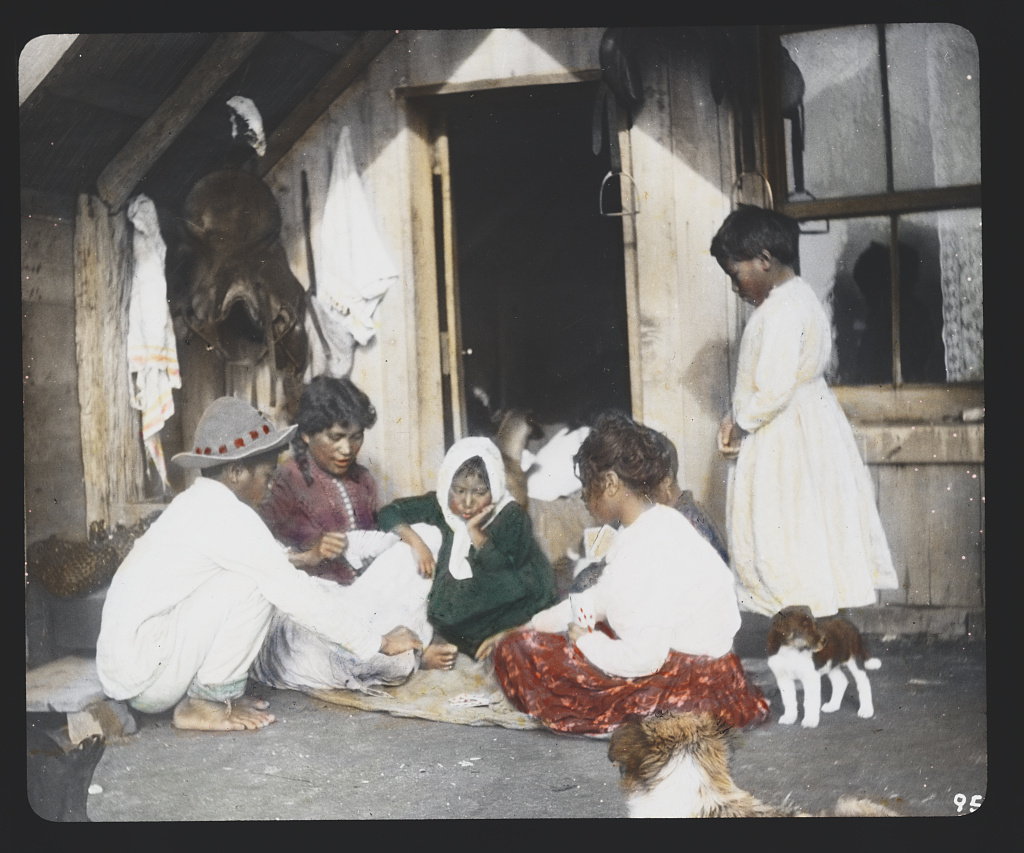
Māori woman and children playing cards on doorstep of their home in Whakarewarewa, 1895

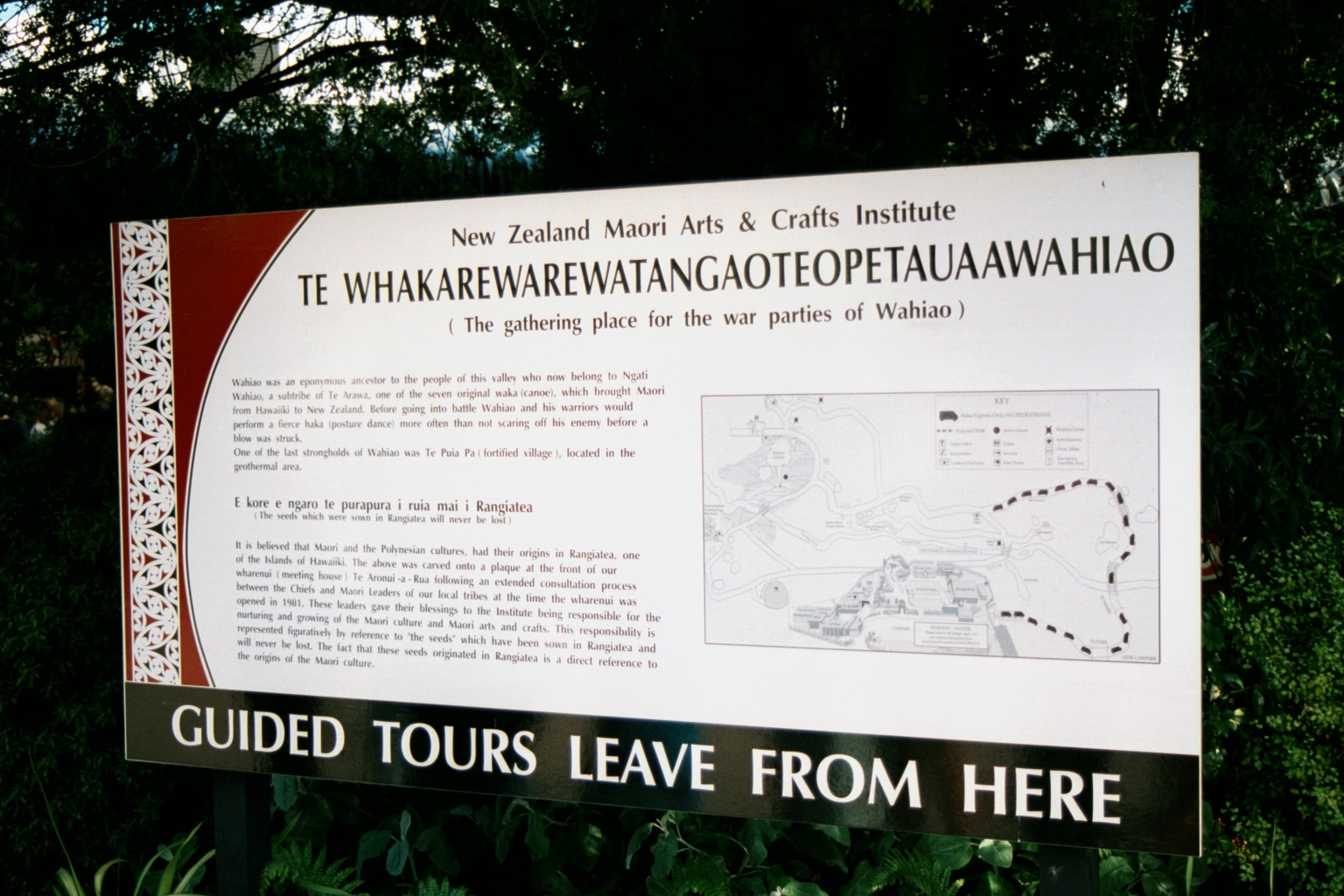
Guided tour sign

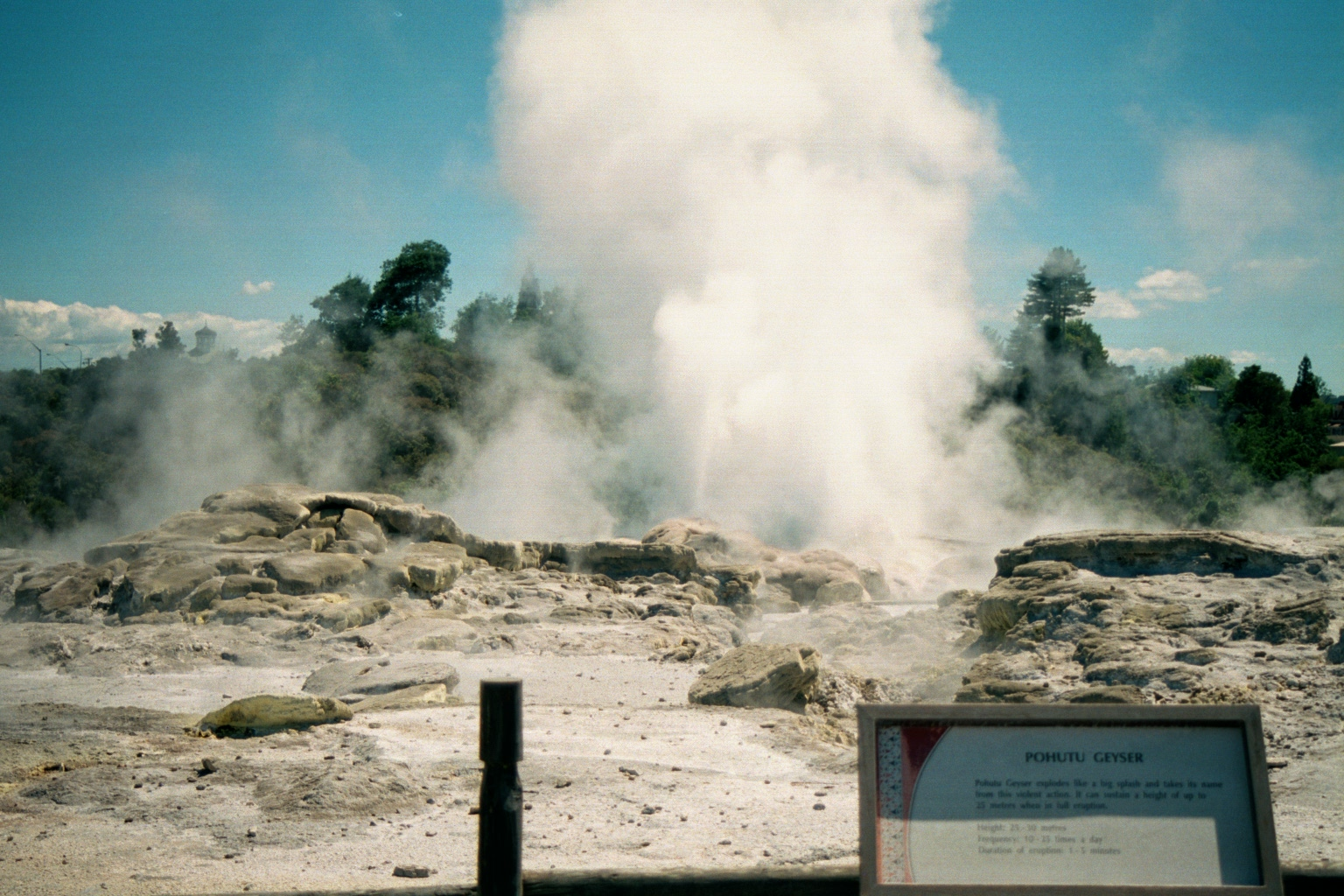
Pōhutu Geyser

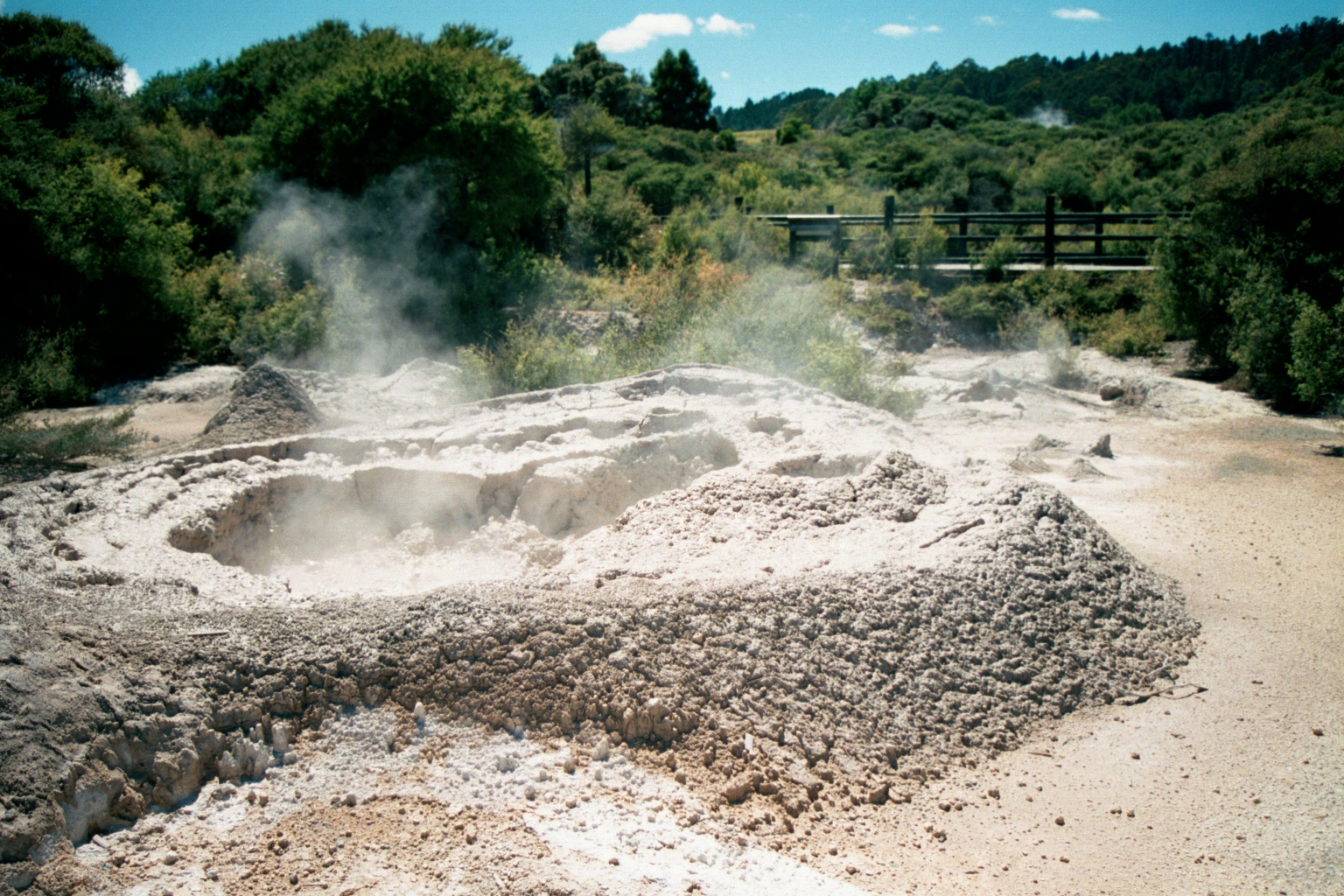
A mudpot

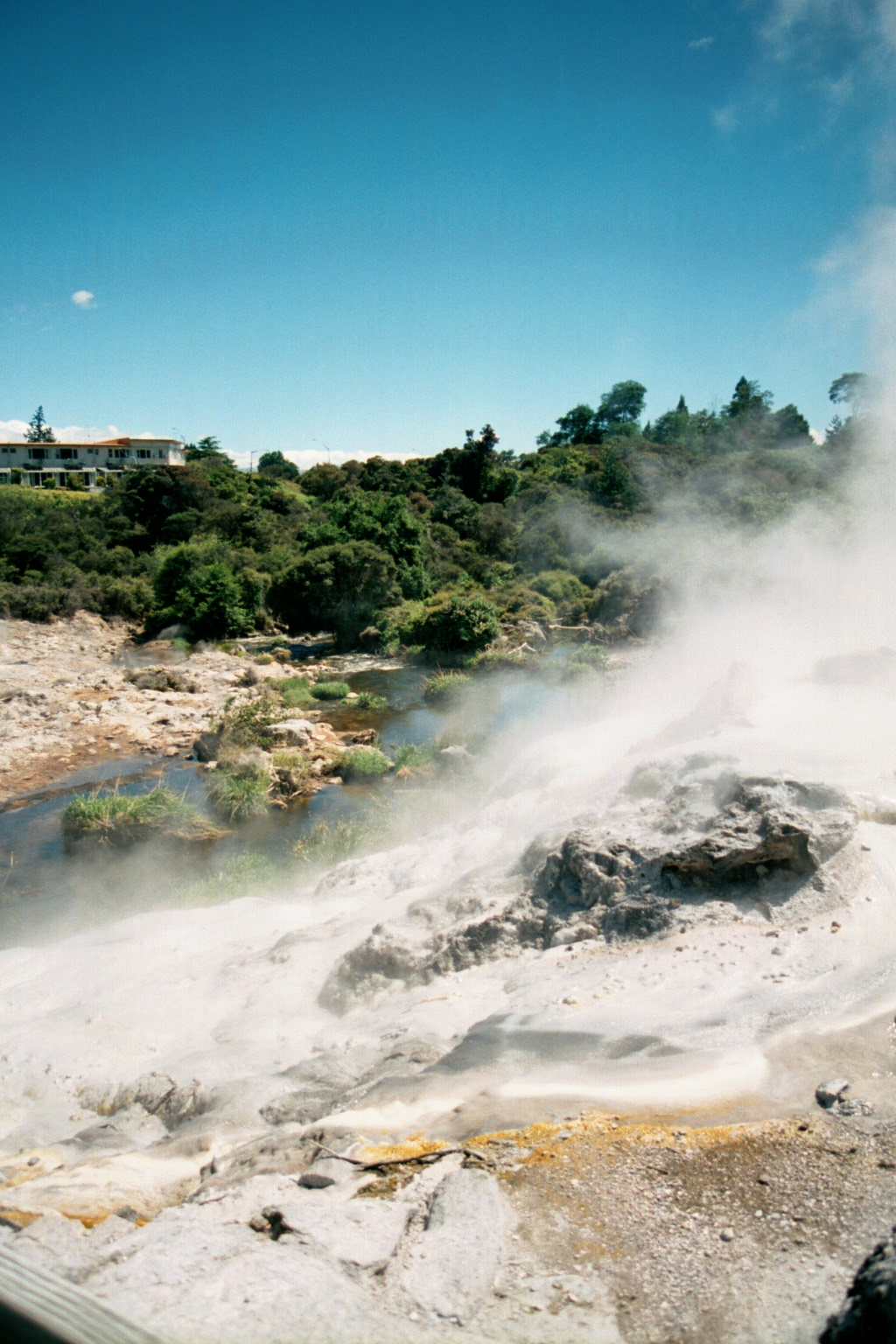
Part of Geyser Flat

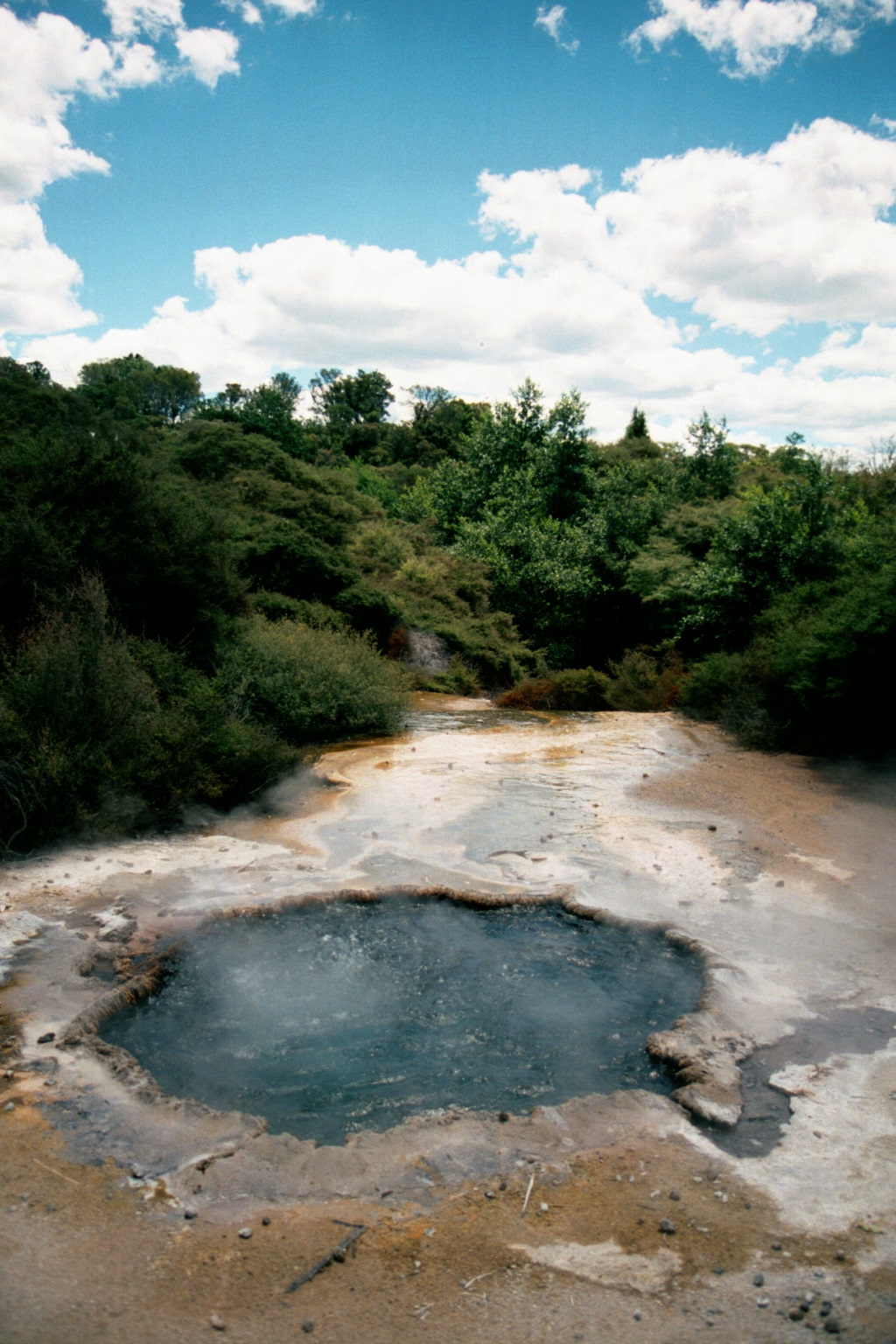
Ngararatuatara (cooking pool) hot spring

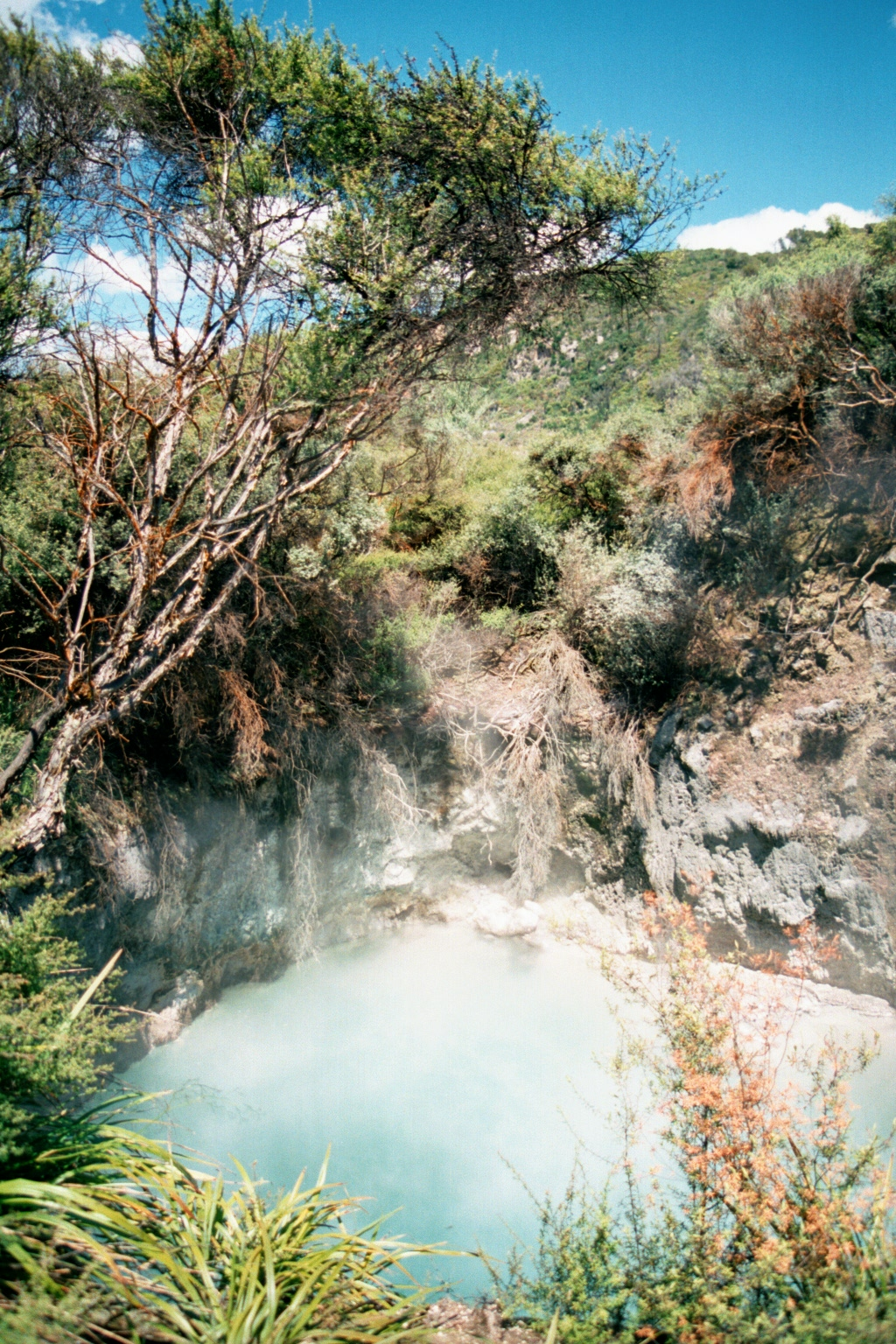
A fumarole

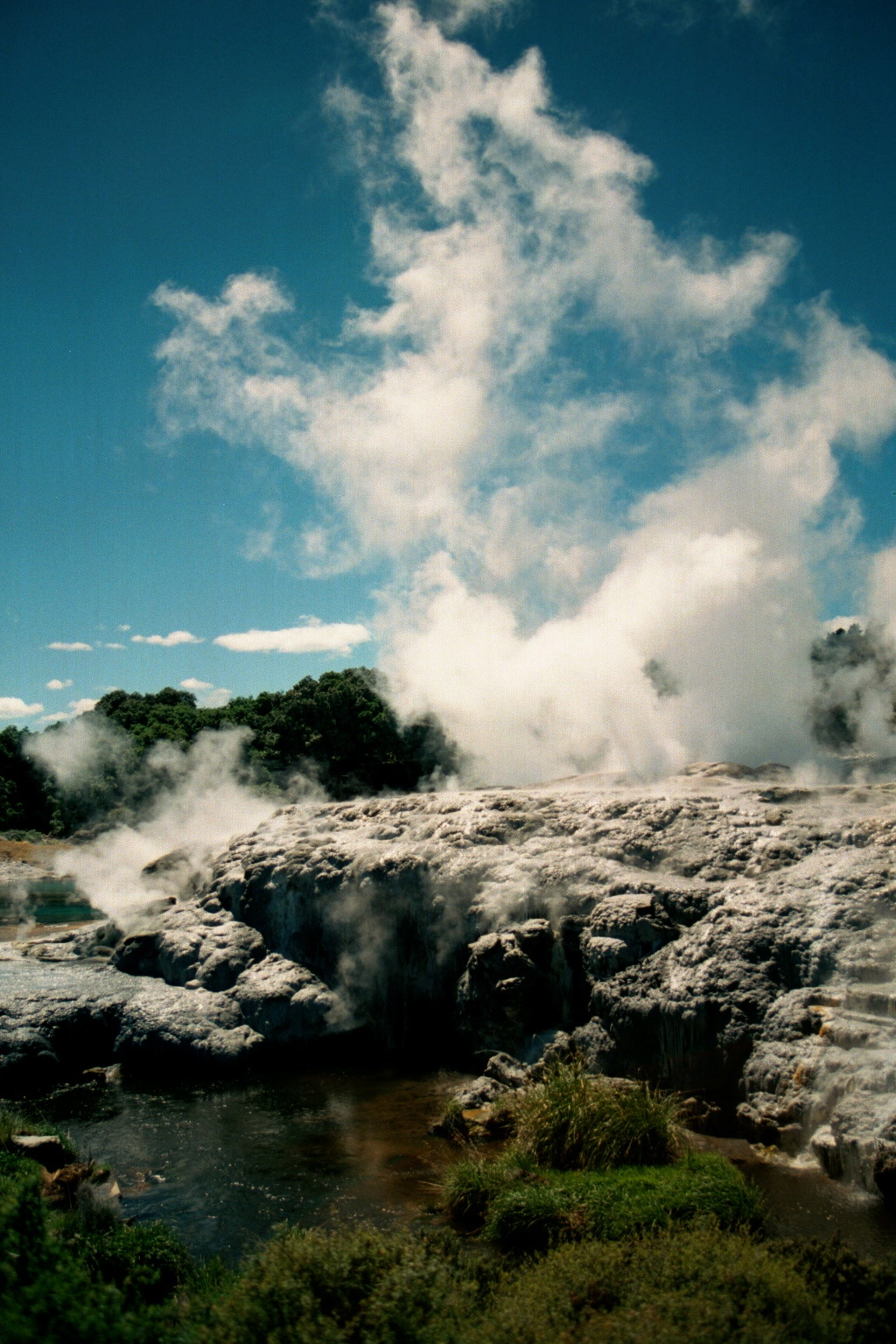
Puarenga Stream

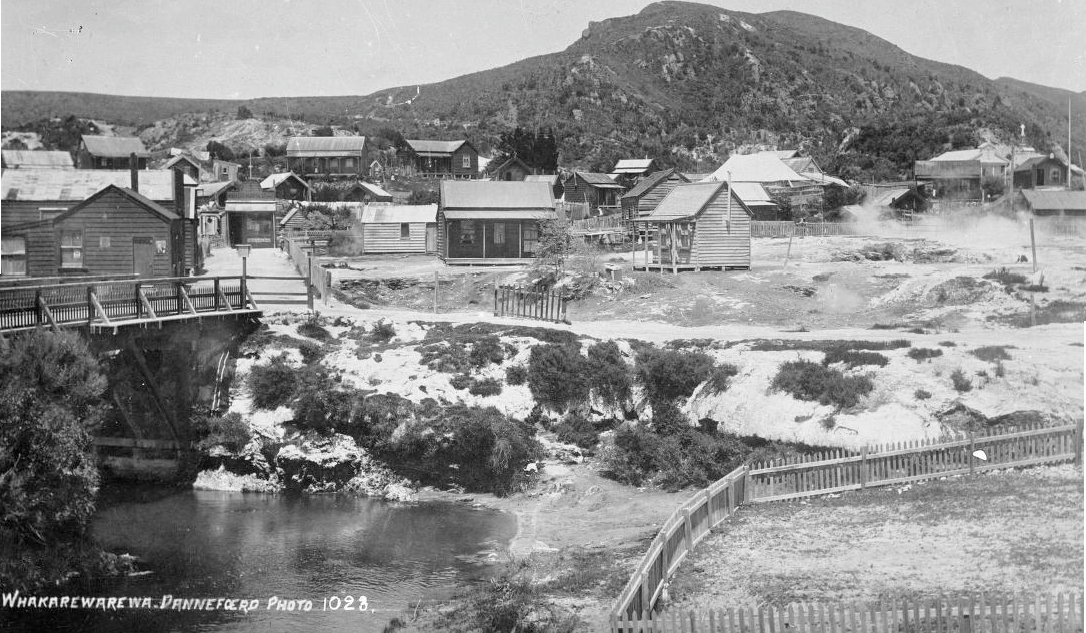
Historical image of the town

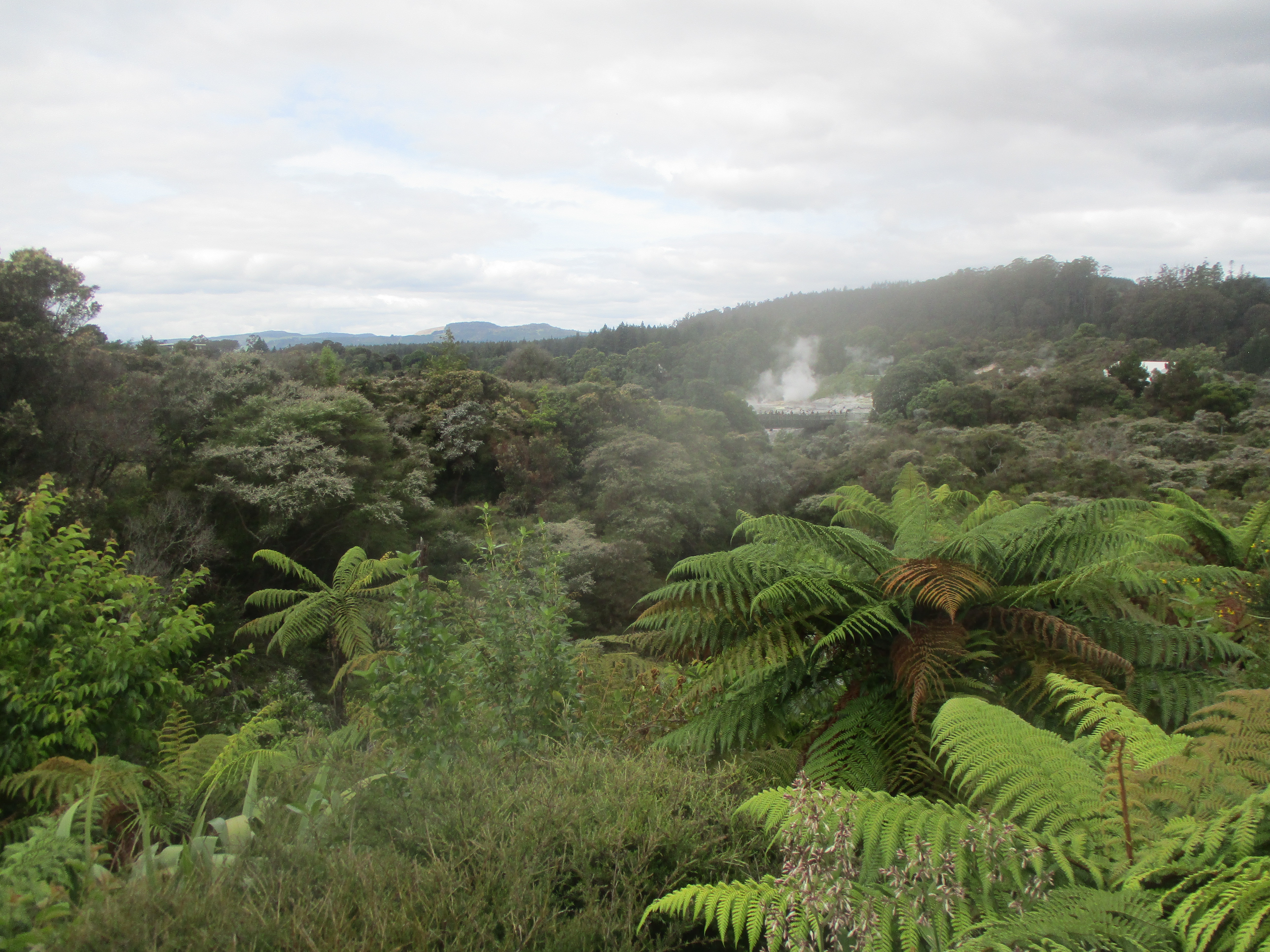

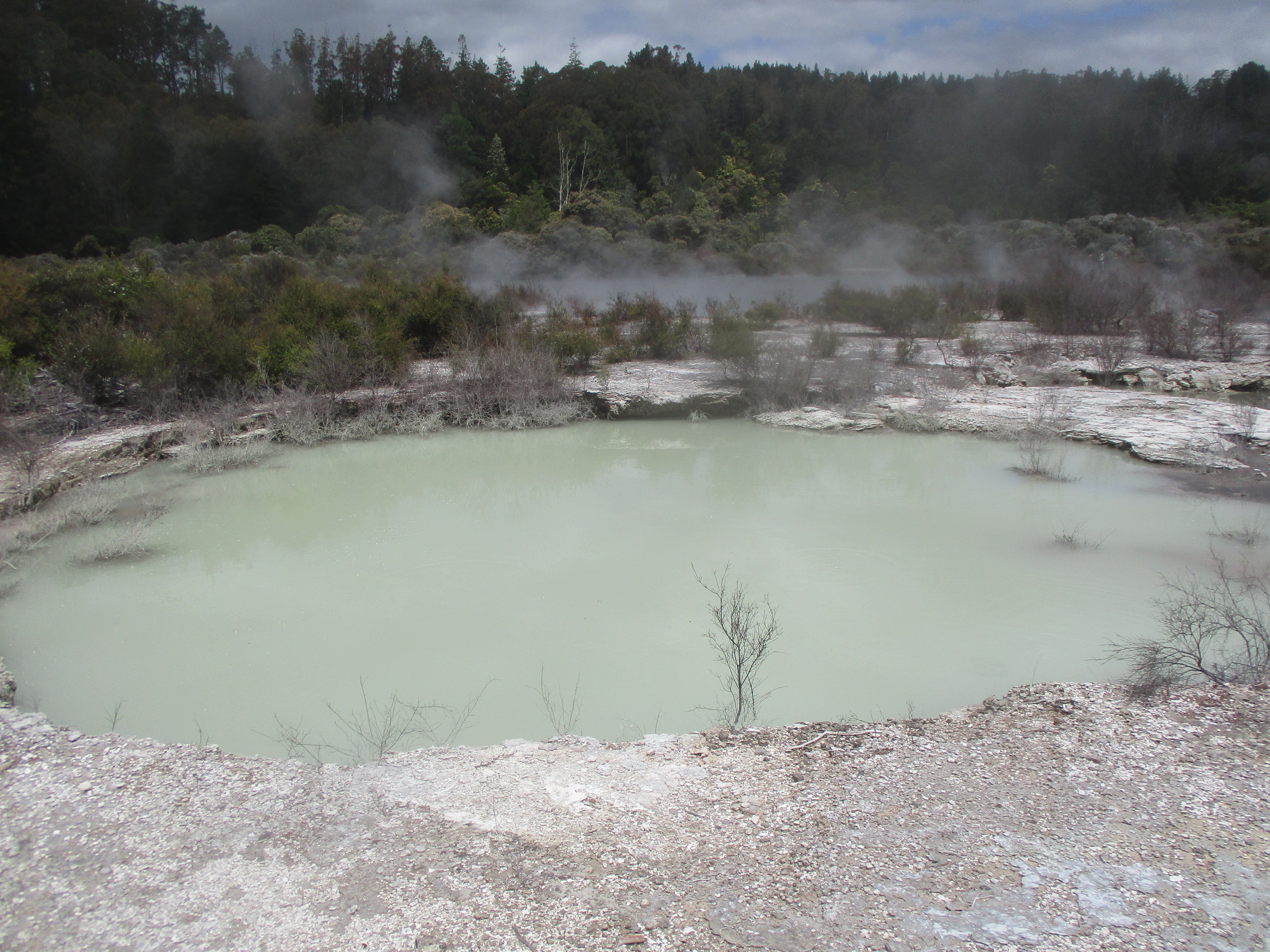

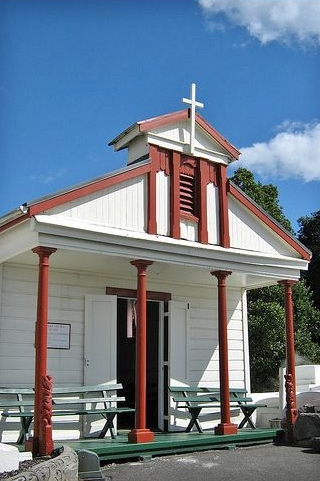
Whakarewarewa Catholic Church
