= Pōhutu Geyser =

Geyser in New Zealand

Coordinates: 38°9′48.64″S 176°15′14.69″E

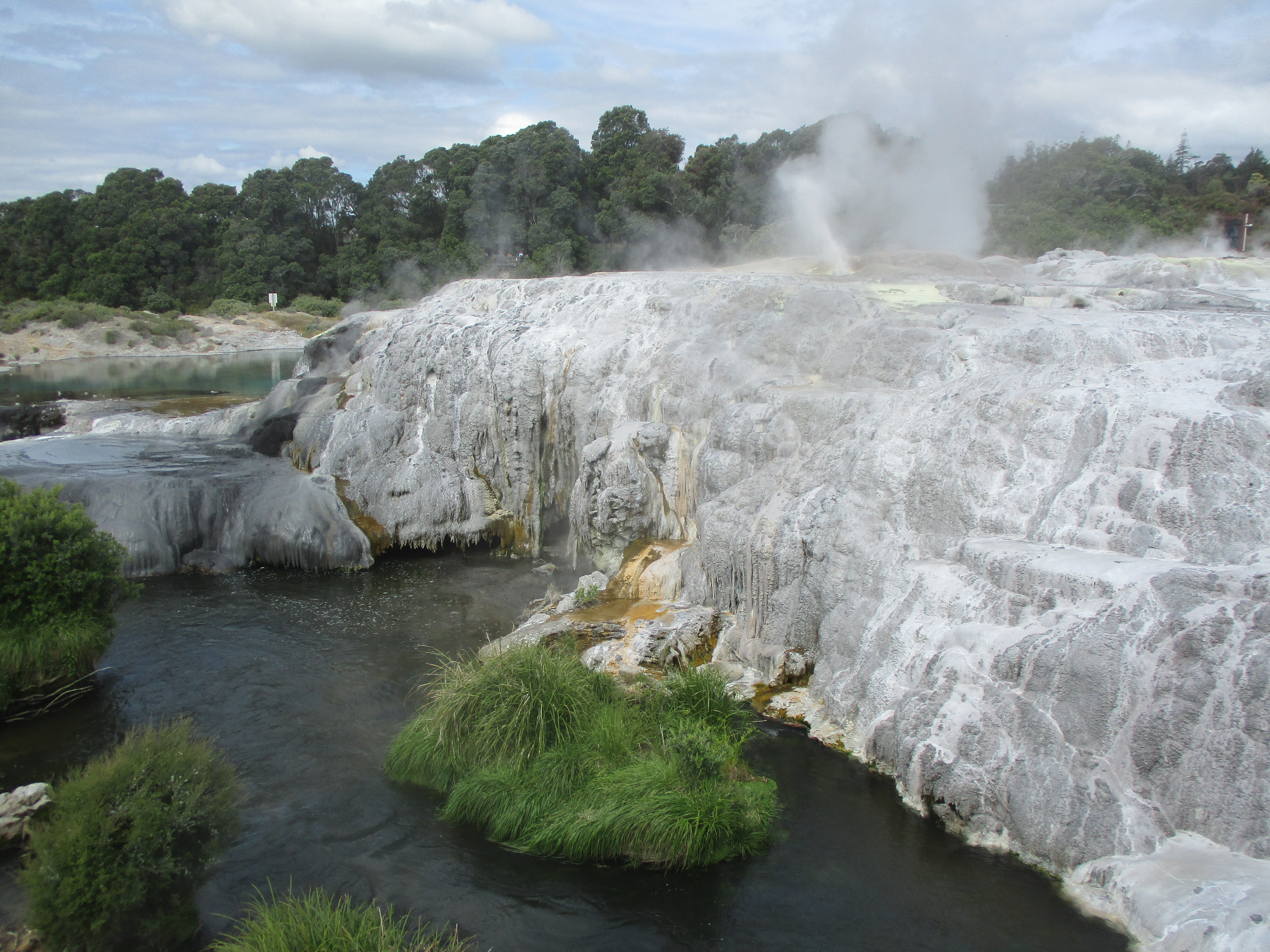
- Pōhutu Geyser erupting in 2023
- Interactive map of Pōhutu Geyser
- Name origin: From Māori for 'big splash'
- Location: Whakarewarewa, Taupō Volcanic Zone
- Type: Geyser
- Eruption height: 30 m (98 ft)
- Frequency: Roughly hourly
- Duration: 10-20 minutes

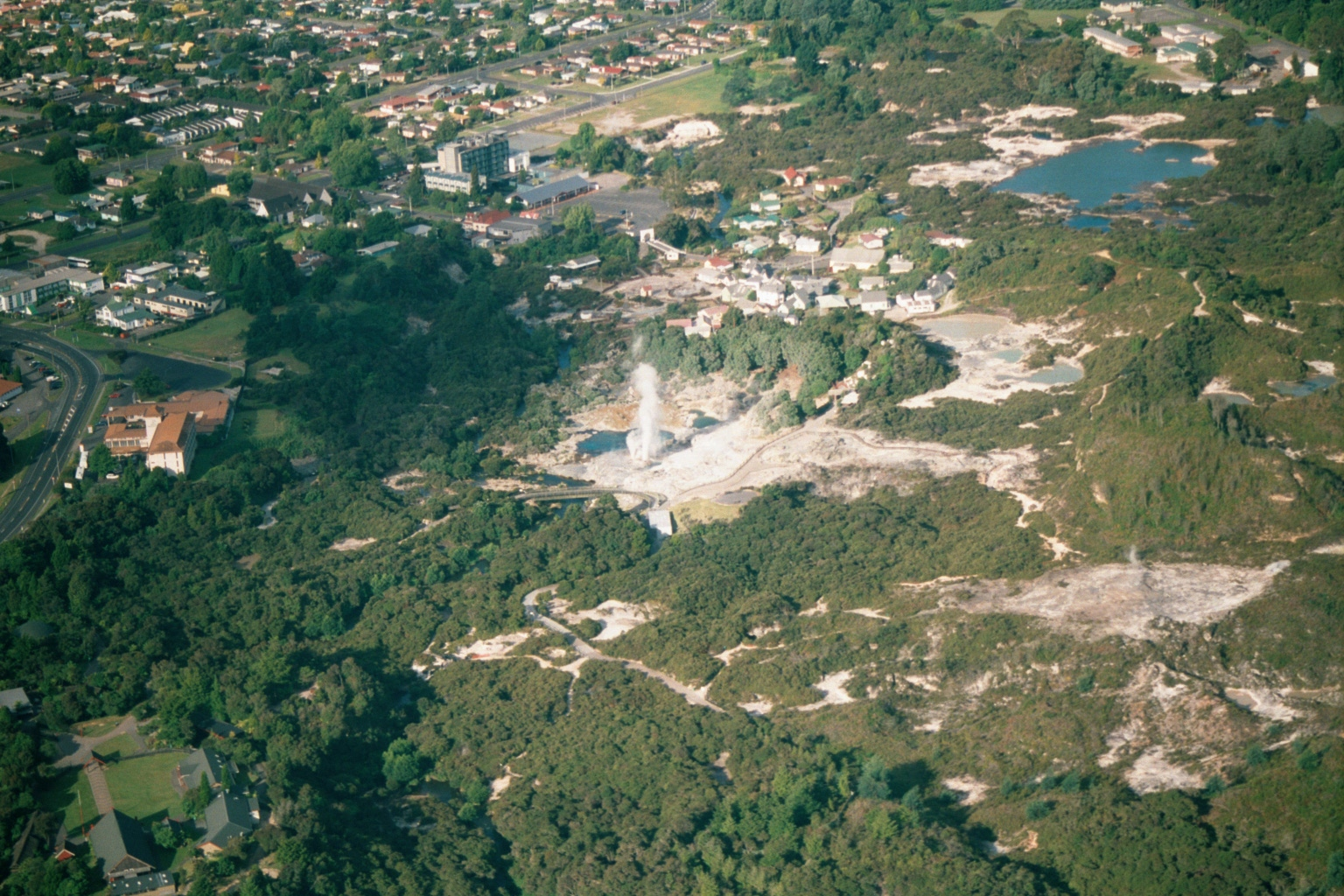
Aerial view of Pohutu Geyser erupting

Pōhutu Geyser is a geyser in the Whakarewarewa Thermal Valley, Rotorua, in the North Island of New Zealand. The geyser is the largest in the southern hemisphere and among the most active in the area, erupting up to twenty times per day at heights of up to 30 m (98 ft). The name Pōhutu is derived from te reo Māori, although it has an unclear etymology – being translated as either 'big splash', 'explosion' or 'constant splashing'.

The use of geothermal bores for heating by nearby Rotorua has impacted on the activity of Pōhutu Geyser and other nearby geothermal features. After a decline in geothermal activity at Whakarewarewa, a programme in the late 1980s saw bores within 1.5 km (0.93 mi) of the geyser being shut, leading to a pronounced increase in activity. This activity increase has concerned some scientists who have been involved with the field, who claim that the increased regularity of Pōhutu Geyser's eruptions may result in the system dying in the future. Its crater is 50 cm (20 in) in diameter.
