= William Hay-MacKenzie =

- Born: William Edward Hay-MacKenzie; 2 July 1874 Oamaru, New Zealand
- Died: 1 December 1946 (aged 72) Wellington, New Zealand
- School: Oamaru High School; Milton High School

Rugby union career
- Position: Fullback
Amateur team(s)
| Years | Team | Apps | (Points) |
| 1894–96, 1898, 1900 | Dunedin | | |
| 1901–06, 1910 | Grafton | | |
Provincial / State sides
| Years | Team | Apps | (Points) |
| 1894–96, 1898, 1900 | Otago | 18 | |
| 1901–06, 1910 | Auckland | 23 | |
International career
| Years | Team | Apps | (Points) |
| 1901 | New Zealand | 2 | (0) |

William "Scobie" Edward Hay-MacKenzie (2 July 1874 – 1 December 1946) was a New Zealand rugby union player who represented the All Blacks in 1901. His position of choice was fullback. Hay-MacKenzie did not play in any test matches as New Zealand did not play their first until 1903.

While Hay-MacKenzie made his two All Black appearances at fullback, he was equally custom to play in the wing and centre positions.

== Career ==
Hay-MacKenzie was educated at Oamaru High School and then Milton High School (now known as Tokomairiro High School). He played for the Dunedin club and gained 18 caps for the Otago province between 1894 and 1900. He then moved north to Auckland and joined the Grafton club. Between 1901 and 1910 Hay-MacKenzie played 23 times for the Auckland provincial side.

He was selected for the national side, the All Blacks in 1901. He played in two games, the first, a warm-up match against Wellington. The second, against New South Wales. Both matches were played at Athletic Park, Wellington. The games were won 24-5 and 20-3 respectively.

Four years later, Hay-MacKenzie played in the North against South Island match, where the North Island team won 26-0. Subsequently, the entire backline apart from Hay-MacKenzie was selected for the team that would go on to be known as the Original All Blacks. Although initially Hay-MacKenzie was included in the squad, he lost out due to the selectors re-choosing the party.

== Personal and death ==
Hay-MacKenzie was on the Dunedin club committee in 1899. He was a life member of the Grafton club.

He lived in Wellington in his later life and played bowls for the Kelburn club where he appeared in the national championships on more than one occasion.

He also played golf, and was a foundation member of the Mirimar golf club.

Hay-MacKenzie died in Wellington on 1 December 1946.
