= Frank Wilson (rugby union, born 1885) =

NZ international rugby union player (1885–1916)

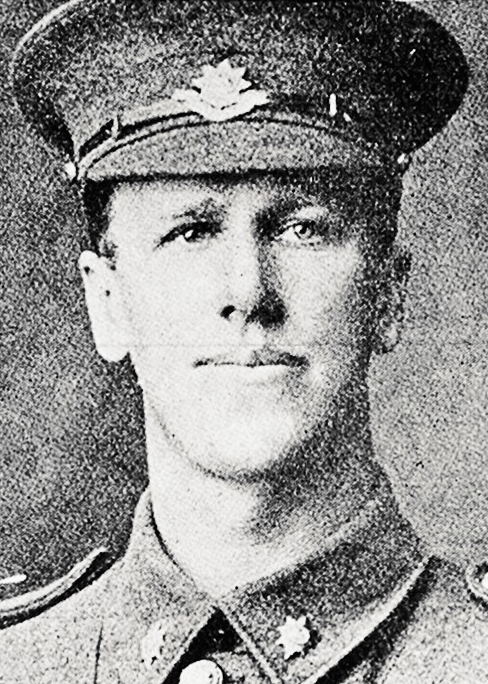
- Born: Frank Reginald Wilson; 28 May 1885 Auckland, New Zealand
- Died: 19 September 1916 (aged 31) Somme, France
- Height: 1.78 m (5 ft 10 in)
- Weight: 74 kg (164 lb)
- School: Auckland Grammar School
- Occupation: Schoolteacher

Rugby union career
- Position: Wing
Provincial / State sides
Years	Team	Apps	(Points)
1906–10	Auckland	22	
International career
Years	Team	Apps	(Points)
1910	New Zealand	0	(0)
- Military career
- Burial place: Dernancourt
- Allegiance: United Kingdom
- Branch: New Zealand Army
- Service years: 1915–1916
- Rank: Second Lieutenant
- Unit: New Zealand Expeditionary Force
- Conflicts: Battle of the Somme

Frank Reginald Wilson (28 May 1885 – 19 September 1916) was a New Zealand rugby union player who represented his country in 1910.

Wilson was educated at Ponsonby School and then Auckland Grammar School, where he was a member of the 1st XV in 1900. A wing three-quarter, Wilson represented Auckland at a provincial level. He was called into the New Zealand national side, the All Blacks, to tour Australia in 1910 because of Donald Cameron's withdrawal. He played a game against Wellington before he departed for Australia where he scored his only points for the All Blacks. He played in the first game in Australia but received an injury and did not appear again.

An all-round sportsman, Wilson was considered one of Auckland's fastest sprinters. He also captained the Ponsonby Cricket Club, as well as being a well-known swimmer and tennis player.

In World War I, Wilson enlisted in the New Zealand Expeditionary Force in March 1915 and embarked for service overseas in August that year. He was commissioned as a second lieutenant in August 1916, and was wounded in action during the Battle of the Somme on 17 September 1916. He died as a result of his wounds two days later. He was buried in the Dernancourt Communal Cemetery Extension.
