= Donald Cameron (rugby union, born 1887) =

NZ international rugby union player

- Born: 15 July 1887 Waitara, New Zealand
- Died: 25 August 1947 (aged 60) New Plymouth, New Zealand
- Weight: 63 kg (139 lb)
- School: Stratford High School

Rugby union career
- Position: Wing Three-quarter
Amateur team(s)
Years	Team	Apps	(Points)
1906–14	Stratford		
Provincial / State sides
Years	Team	Apps	(Points)
1906–14	Taranaki	59	(146)
International career
Years	Team	Apps	(Points)
1908	New Zealand	3	(3)

Donald "Don" Cameron (15 July 1887 – 25 August 1947) was a New Zealand rugby union player who played three test matches for the All Blacks in 1908, scoring one try.

He was educated at Stratford High School.

== Career ==
A goalkicker, Cameron represented Taranaki in the 1900s and in the 1910s, making his debut as a 19-year-old in 1906. Apart from playing his usual position of wing three-quarter, he also played as a centre, fullback and five-eighth while playing for Taranaki. He scored four tries in a 47–3 win against Manawatu in 1906.

His three appearances for the national side were against the touring Anglo-Welsh. He scored a try on debut, however he missed both of his conversation attempts in his final game.

Cameron was selected for the 1910 All Black team to play in Australia but withdrew and was replaced by Frank Wilson.

His father, R.H Cameron represented Taranaki in 1885.
